= Koliadka =

Eastern European Christmas songs

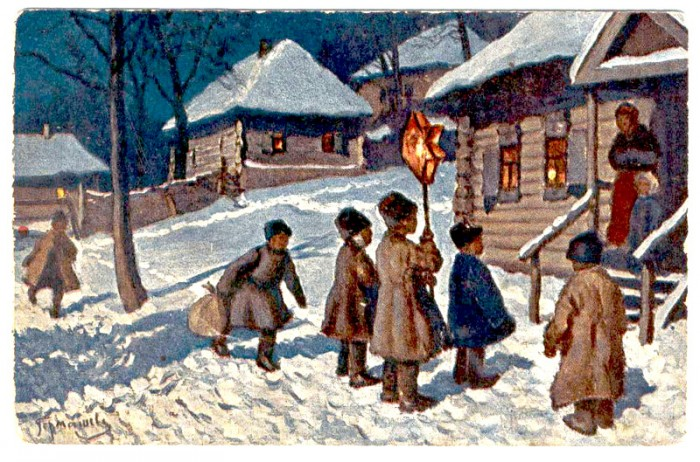
M. Germashev. «With a Star». 1916

Koliadka (Note: Ukrainian: колядка, plural колядки - koliadky; Czech: koleda; Bulgarian: коледарска песен; Romanian: colindă; Polish: kolęda; Greek: κάλαντα) are traditional songs usually sung in Eastern and Western Slavic, Central European and Eastern European countries during the Christmas holiday season. It is believed that everything sung about will come true.

Singing of koliadky is connected with the practice of koliaduvannia (koleduvane, kolędowanie), which involves people, usually children and youths, going from house to house carrying a star and greeting the hosts with songs.

== History ==
=== In Ukraine ===
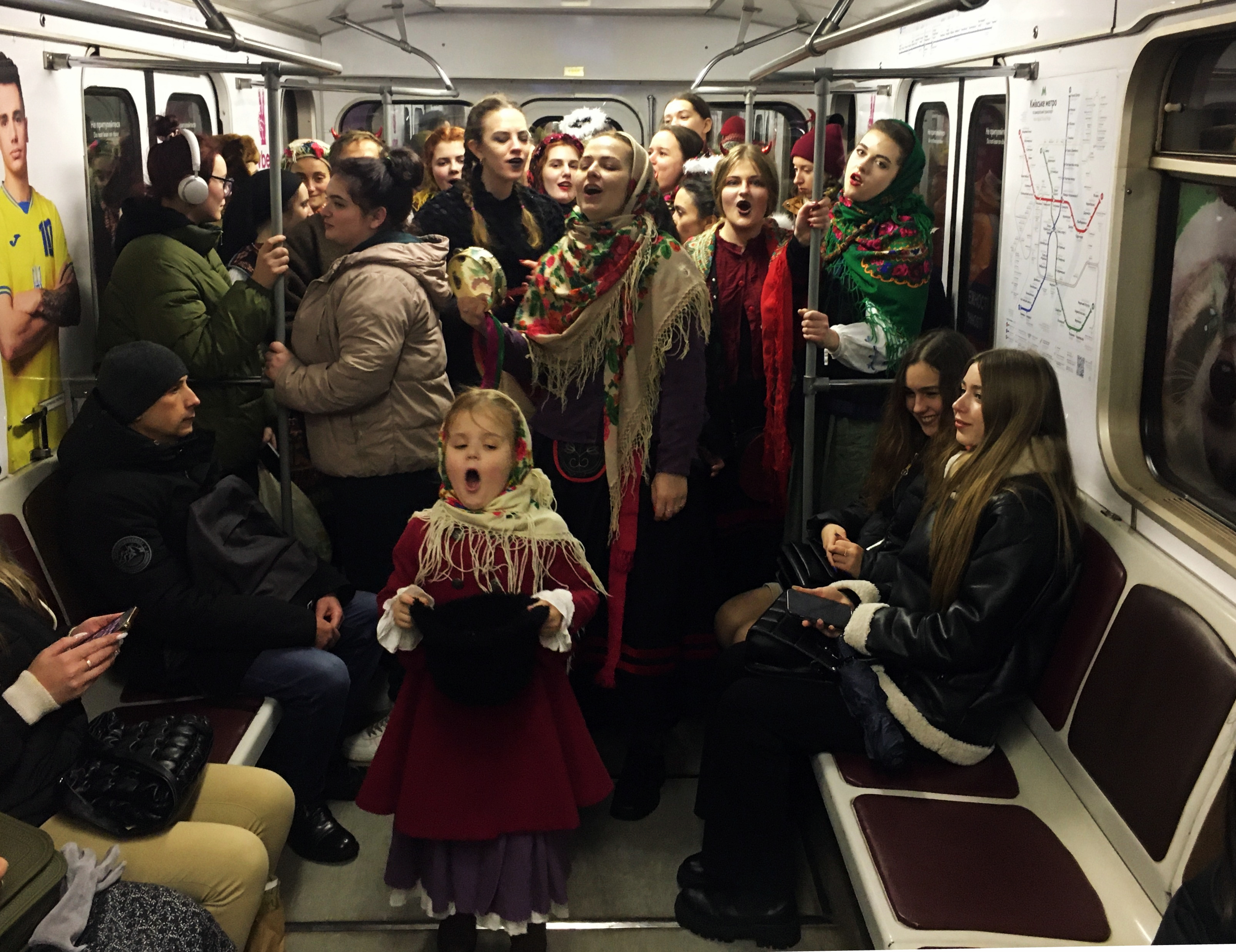
Modern koliadka performers on a Kyiv Metro train

Koliadky have been sung since pre-Christian times in Kievan Rus'. Those songs were used for ritual purposes. In early times, koliadky expressed ancient people's ideas about creation, natural phenomena, and the structure of the world. With the advent of Christianity, the content of koliadky began to acquire the relevant religious meaning and features.

Now koliadky are mostly Christmas carols, which tell of the birth of Jesus Christ and biblical stories that happened in connection with the event. Heathen roots are still there.

In Ukraine under the Soviet rule, organized public singing of koliadky (vertep) on Christmas Eve was persecuted by authorities, so it frequently took place on the night before the New Year instead. In some cases people taking part in such events would be arrested by the KGB for "hooliganism". Especially notable were the mass arrests which took place in January 1972 and targeted participants of a festive procession accompanied by koliadka singing, which took place in central Lviv and was led by Ihor and Iryna Kalynets.

Despite repression, the traditions of koliadka and vertep survived both among the rural and urban population in Western Ukraine, and in 1986 reached the local theatre scene. Koliadka performances even spread to Soviet prison camps, where many Ukrainian dissidents were held at the time. Among others, Myroslav Marynovych organized the singing of koliadky with fellow inmates after his imprisonment in 1978. Starting from 1988, koliadka singing and vertep performances in Lviv were officially permitted by authorities through the efforts of Lion's Society, although some elements of the processions, such as figures of angels, were still banned by the Communist regime. Starting from the 1990s the tradition of koliadka and vertep theatre has also seen a revival in other regions of Ukraine, including Kyiv.

== Typology and structure ==
New Joy Has Come
Tune of New Joy Has Come (Нова радість стала), a popular Ukrainian koliadka

In Ukraine koliadka songs are dedicated to various topics including mythology, history, agriculture, love and marriage, everyday life and humour. Typical koliadky contain lyrics glorifying and wishing good luck to the family or a particular person being addressed by the singers. Their melody is typical for ritual songs. Some koliadky can be also used as shchedrivkas with a different refrain. A separate type of koliadky widespread in Eastern Polesia, Poltava region, Podolia, Ukrainian Carpathians and parts of Volhynia contains topics connected with harvest, has common traits with wedding songs and almost totally lacks Christian elements, which could hint at its more ancient origins. A separate group of koliadky are so-called "church koliadky", which are performed in church on Christmas and during the following two weeks, and can also be included in vertep plays. One of the most popular songs of this type is New Joy Has Come (Нова радість стала). A number of parodies of this type of koliadky also exists. In colloquial use songs used during "sowing", "goat guiding", as well as Nativity songs are also known as "koliadky".

There are several koliadky which are dedicated to Saint Nicholas in Ukraine. Among them: "Ой, хто, хто Миколая любить" ("Oh, who Loves Saint Nicholas"), "Ходить по землі Святий Миколай" ("Saint Nicholas Walks Around The World"), "Миколай, Миколай ти до нас завітай!" (Nicholas, Nicholas, Come To Visit Us!).

== In modern culture ==
Children performing a popular koliadka in Luhansk, Ukraine

Serbians and Montenegrins sing koliadky dedicated to Saint Nicholas in their churches. Slovaks, Czechs and sometimes Belarusians sing koliadky not only on Saint Nicholas Day (which they celebrate on December 6), but on Saint Stephen Day (December 26) too.

Ukrainians sing koliadky and shchedrivky on Saint Nicholas Day (December 6) and on Christmas Eve (December 24). There are other types of winter holidays ritual songs in Ukraine named schedrivky and posivalky. Traditionally, their purposes are clearly divided, but in modern Ukrainian culture these concepts have intertwined, mixed and acquired traits of each other.

Koliadky are also sung in countries where big diasporas are present, including Ukrainians which live in Canada.

== In classical music ==
Arrangements of koliadky were created by Ukrainian composers Hanna Havrylets, Michael Hayvoronsky, Pylyp Kozytsky, Alexander Koshetz, Mykola Lysenko, Kyrylo Stetsenko, Vasyl Barvinsky and others. Own versions of koliadky were created by a number of modern composers such as Pavlo Dvorsky. Koliadka tunes also inspired works by Viktor Kaminsky, Borys Lyatoshynsky and others.

=== "The Little Swallow" ===
Ukrainian "Щедрик" ("Shchedryk"), known in English as "The Little Swallow", is a famous folk song that has pre-Christian roots. The song was arranged by the Ukrainian composer and teacher Mykola Leontovych in 1916. "Shchedryk" was later adapted as an English Christmas carol, "Carol of the Bells", by popular American composer, educator, and choral conductor of Ukrainian ethnic origin Peter J. Wilhousky following a performance of the original song by Alexander Koshetz's Ukrainian National Chorus at Carnegie Hall on October 5, 1921. Peter J. Wilhousky copyrighted and published his new lyrics (which were not based on the Ukrainian lyrics) in 1936.

Conceptually, Ukrainian lyrics of this song meets the definition of shchedrivka (Malanka song) while English content of "Carol of the Bells" indicates it as koliadka (Christmas song).

On December 9, 2016, Georgian-born British singer Katie Melua and The Gori Women's Choir (which is conducted by Teona Tsiramua) sang original Ukrainian "Shchedryk" on BBC.

== See also ==
- Shchedryk (song)
- Koliada
- List of Ukrainian Koliadkas and Shchedrivkas
- Koliaduvannia
- List of Christmas carols
- Ukrainian folk music
- Posivannia
