= Christmas carol =

Song or hymn on the theme of Christmas

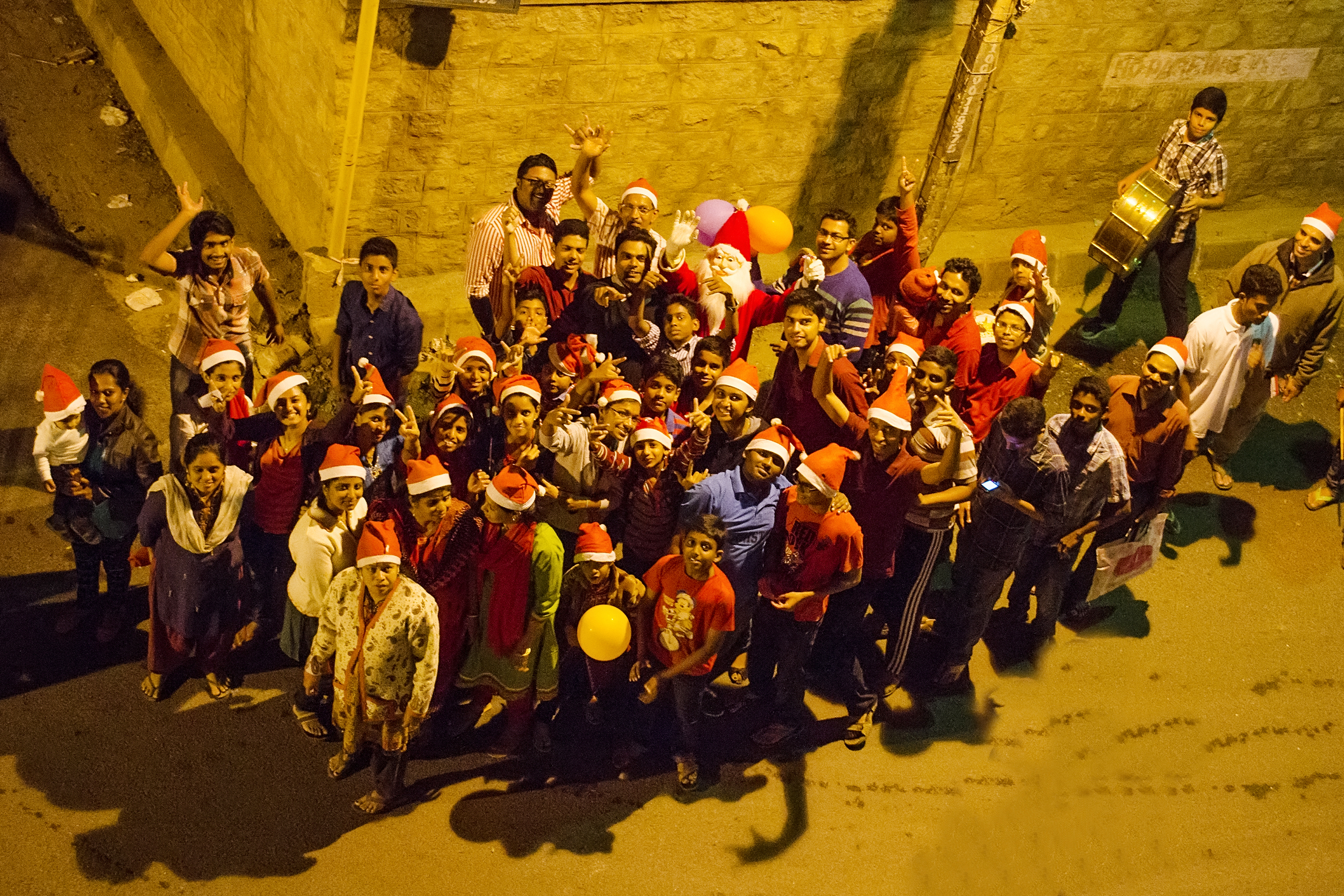
Christmas carol group at Bangalore, India

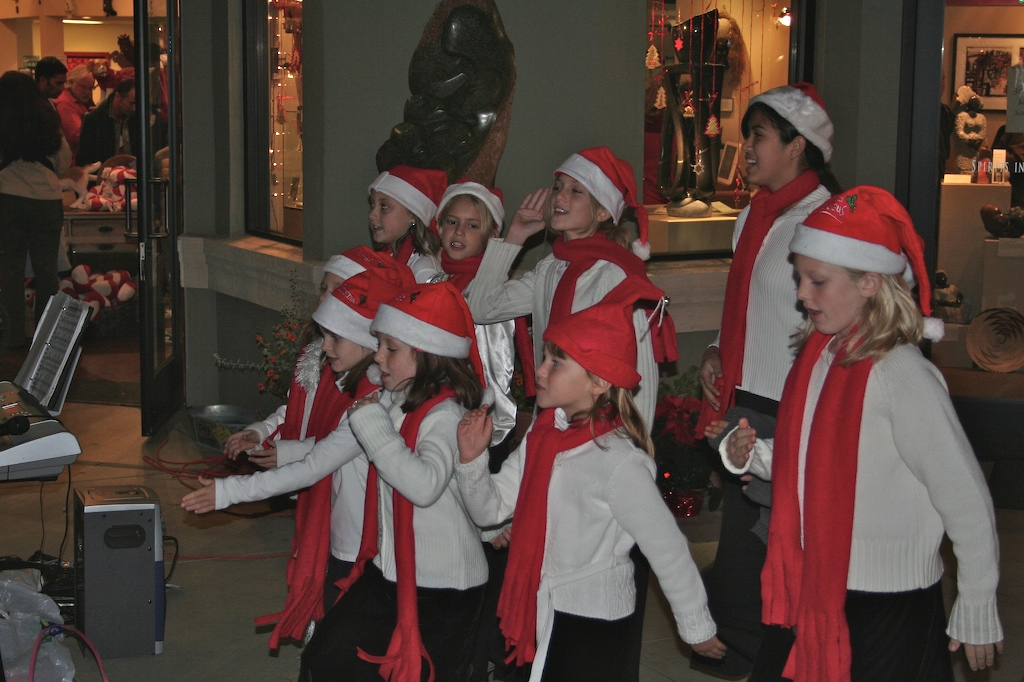
Children singing Christmas carols in California

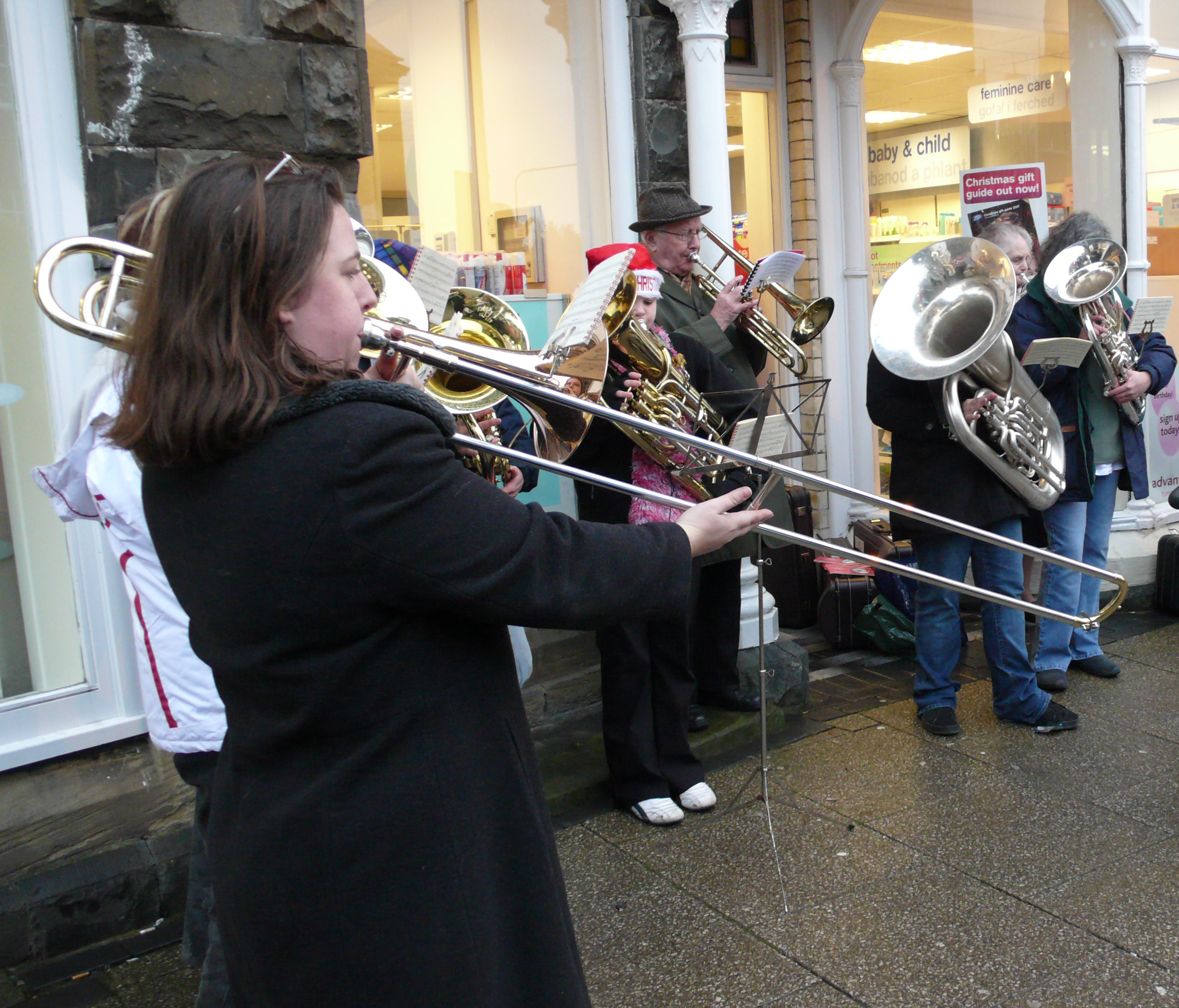
A brass band playing Christmas carols in the UK

A Christmas carol is a carol (a song or hymn) on the theme of Christmas, traditionally sung at Christmas itself or during the surrounding Christmas and holiday season. The term noel has sometimes been used, especially for carols of French origin. Christmas carols may be regarded as a subset of the broader category of Christmas music.

== History ==
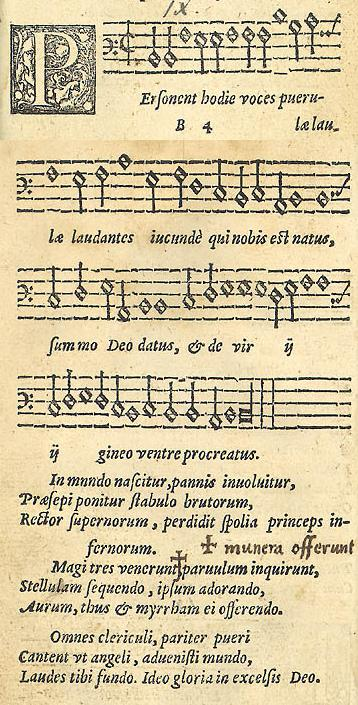
A 1582 published version of the Latin carol Personent hodie

The first known Christmas hymns may be traced to 4th-century Rome. Latin hymns such as Veni redemptor gentium, written by Ambrose, Archbishop of Milan, were austere statements of the theological doctrine of the Incarnation in opposition to Arianism. Corde natus ex Parentis (Of the Father's heart begotten) by the Spanish poet Prudentius (d. 413) is still sung in some churches today.

In the 9th and 10th centuries, the Christmas sequence (or prose) emerged in monasteries of Northern Europe, developing under the influence of Bernard of Clairvaux into a liturgical sequence composed of rhymed stanzas. In the 12th century, the Parisian monk Adam of Saint Victor began incorporating melodic elements derived from popular songs, creating musical forms more closely resembling the traditional Christmas carol.

By the 13th century, a strong tradition of popular Christmas songs written in regional vernacular languages had developed in France, Germany, and particularly Italy, under the influence of Francis of Assisi. The earliest English Christmas carols appear in a 1426 manuscript by the Shropshire chaplain John Awdlay, who recorded twenty-five "caroles of Cristemas", likely sung by groups of wassailers traveling from house to house.

The songs now identified as Christmas carols were originally communal festival songs performed during seasonal celebrations such as harvesttide. Only later were they adopted for church use and associated specifically with the Christmas season.

Many carols that later gained widespread popularity were printed in Piae Cantiones, a collection of late-medieval Latin songs first published in 1582. Early Latin forms of carols such as "Christ was born on Christmas Day", "Good Christian Men, Rejoice", and "Good King Wenceslas" appear in this collection. "Adeste Fideles" ("O Come, All Ye Faithful") appears in its present form in the mid-18th century, although its lyrics may date to the 13th century; the origin of its melody remains disputed.

Christmas carols increased in popularity following the Protestant Reformation, particularly in regions where Protestant churches became dominant. Reformers such as Martin Luther actively promoted congregational singing and composed carols for worship, reflecting the Lutheran tradition's strong embrace of sacred music.

During the period of the Puritan ban on Christmas in England, semi-clandestine religious services commemorating Christ's birth continued to be held, and carols were sung privately despite official restrictions.

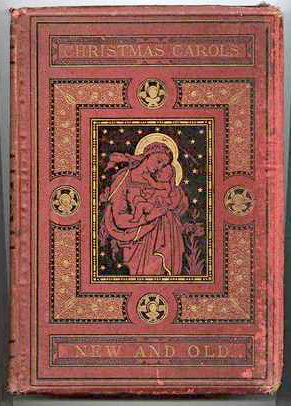
19th-century collections such as Christmas Carols, New and Old (1871) helped popularize Christmas carols

The publication of Christmas music books in the 19th century helped to widen the popular appeal of carols. "God Rest Ye Merry, Gentlemen", "The First Noel", "I Saw Three Ships" and "Hark! The Herald Angels Sing" appear in English antiquarian William Sandys' 1833 collection Christmas Carols, Ancient and Modern. Composers such as Arthur Sullivan helped to repopularise the carol, and it is this period that gave rise to such favourites as "Good King Wenceslas" and "It Came Upon the Midnight Clear", a New England carol written by Edmund H. Sears and Richard S. Willis. The publication in 1871 of Christmas Carols, New and Old by Henry Ramsden Bramley and Sir John Stainer was a significant contribution to a revival of carols in Victorian Britain. In 1916, Charles Lewis Hutchins published Carols Old and Carols New, a scholarly collection which suffered from a short print run and is consequently rarely available today. The Oxford Book of Carols, first published in 1928 by Oxford University Press (OUP), was a notably successful collection; edited by the British composers Martin Shaw and Ralph Vaughan Williams, along with clergyman and author Percy Dearmer, it became a widely used source of carols in among choirs and church congregations in Britain and remains in print today.

The singing of carols was further popularised in the 20th century when OUP published one of the most popular carol books in the English-speaking world, Carols for Choirs. First published in 1961 and edited by David Willcocks and Reginald Jacques, this bestselling series has since expanded to a five-volume set. Along with editor John Rutter, the compilers included many arrangements of carols derived from sources such as Piae Cantiones, as well as pieces by modern composers such as William Walton, Benjamin Britten, Richard Rodney Bennett, William Mathias and John Rutter.

Today carols are regularly sung at Christian religious services. Some compositions have words that are clearly not of a religious theme, but are often still referred to as "carols". For example, the 16th-century song "A Bone, God Wot!" appears to be a wassailing song (which is sung during drinking or while requesting ale), but is described in the British Library's Cottonian Collection as a Christmas carol. As recently as 1865, Christmas-related lyrics were adopted for the traditional English folk song "Greensleeves", becoming the internationally popular Christmas carol "What Child is This?". Little research has been conducted on carol singing, but one of the few sociological studies of caroling in the early 21st century in Finland determined that the sources of songs are often misunderstood, and that it is simplistic to suggest caroling is mostly related to Christian beliefs, for it also reinforces preservation of diverse national customs and local family traditions.

A modern form of the practice of caroling can be seen in "Dial-A-Carol", an annual tradition held by students at the University of Illinois at Urbana-Champaign, wherein potential audiences call the singers to request a performance over phone call.

=== Carols for dancing ===
It is not clear whether the word carol derives from the French "carole" or the Latin "carula" meaning a circular dance.

=== Music ===
Traditionally, carols have often been based on medieval chord patterns, and it is this that gives them their uniquely characteristic musical sound. Some carols like "Personent hodie", "Good King Wenceslas", and "The Holly and the Ivy" can be traced directly back to the Middle Ages, and are among the oldest musical compositions still regularly sung.

Compositions continue to be written that become popular carols. For example, many of the carols written by Alfred Burt are sung regularly in both sacred and secular settings, and are among the better known modern Christmas carols.

== Church and liturgical use ==
Almost all the well-known carols were not sung in church until the second half of the 19th century. Hymns Ancient and Modern 1861–1874 included several carols. Isaac Watts, the "father of English hymnody", composed "Joy to the World", which has become a popular Christmas carol even though it is widely believed that Watts did not write it to be sung only at Christmas.

Charles Wesley wrote texts for at least three Christmas carols, of which the best known was originally entitled "Hark! How All the Welkin Rings", later edited to "Hark! the Herald Angels Sing". A tune from a cantata, Festgesang, by Felix Mendelssohn in 1840 was adapted by William H. Cummings to fit Wesley's words. This combination first appeared in "Hymns Ancient and Modern" in 1861.

"Silent Night" comes from Austria. The carol was first performed in the Nikolauskirche in Oberndorf on 24 December 1818. Mohr had composed the words much earlier, in 1816, but on Christmas Eve brought them to Gruber and asked him to compose a melody and guitar accompaniment for the church service. The first English translation was in 1871 where it was published in a Methodist hymnal.

== Episodes described ==
Several different Christmas episodes, apart from the birth of Jesus itself, are described in Christmas carols, such as:

- The Annunciation, for example "Gabriel's Message"
- The Census of Augustus, a rare subject, but touched upon in "On a Day When Men Were Counted" by Daniel Thambyrajah Niles (1964)
- The Annunciation to the shepherds, for example "While Shepherds Watched Their Flocks"
- The Adoration of the shepherds, for example the Czech carol "Nesem vám noviny" (translated into English as "Come, All Ye Shepherds")
- The Star of Bethlehem, for example, "Star of the East"
- The Visit of the Magi, for example "We Three Kings"
- The Massacre of the Innocents, for example the "Coventry Carol"

In addition, some carols describe Christmas-related events of a religious nature, but not directly related to the birth of Jesus. For example:

- "Good King Wenceslas", based on a legend about Saint Wenceslaus helping a poor man on 26 December (the Feast of Stephen)
- "Ding Dong Merrily on High" and "I Heard the Bells on Christmas Day", reflecting on the practice of ringing church bells at Christmas

== Early examples ==
15th-century English Christmas carol
"This Endris Night", discovered by Thomas Wright in 1847. Performed by the U.S. Army Band Chorus.

Antiquarians in the 19th-century rediscovered early carols in museums. According to the Encyclopædia Britannica, about 500 have been found. Some are wassailing songs, some are religious songs in English, some are in Latin, and some are "macaronic" — a mixture of English and Latin. Since most people did not understand Latin, the implication is that these songs were composed for church choristers, or perhaps for an educated audience at the Royal courts. The most famous survival of these early macaronic carols is "The Boar's Head". The tradition of singing carols outside of church services early in the 19th century is best illustrated by Thomas Hardy's novel Under the Greenwood Tree (1872). In England and other countries, such as Poland (kolęda), Romania (colindă) and Bulgaria (koledari), there is a tradition of Christmas caroling (earlier known as wassailing), in which groups of singers travel from house to house, singing carols at each, for which they are often rewarded with gifts, money, mince pies, or a glass of an appropriate beverage. Money collected in this way is now normally given to charity.

Singing carols in church was instituted on Christmas Eve 1880 in Truro Cathedral, Cornwall, (see article on Nine Lessons and Carols), and now seen in churches all over the world. The songs that were chosen for singing in church omitted the wassailing carols, and the words "hymn" and "carol" were used almost interchangeably. Shortly before, in 1878, the Salvation Army, under Charles Fry, instituted the idea of playing carols at Christmas, using a brass band. Carols can be sung by individual singers, but are also often sung by larger groups, including professionally trained choirs. Most churches have special services at which carols are sung, generally combined with readings from scripture about the birth of Christ; this is often based on the famous Festival of Nine Lessons and Carols at King's College, Cambridge.

== In classical music ==
In the 1680s and 1690s, two French composers incorporated carols into their works. Louis-Claude Daquin wrote 12 noels for organ. Marc-Antoine Charpentier wrote a few instrumental versions of noels, plus one major choral work Messe de minuit pour Noël. Johann Sebastian Bach included Christmas carols in his cantatas for Christmastide, including his Christmas Oratorio. Peter Cornelius included carol melodies in the accompaniment of his song cycle Weihnachtslieder, Op. 8. Other examples include:

- Ralph Vaughan Williams: Fantasia on Christmas Carols, 1912.
- Victor Hely-Hutchinson: Carol Symphony, 1927.
- Benjamin Britten: A Ceremony of Carols (for choir and harp), 1942
- Christina Rossetti's poem "In the Bleak Midwinter" has been set to music by Gustav Holst (1905), Harold Darke (1911) and others.
- Polish composer Krzysztof Penderecki extensively quotes the Christmas carol "Silent Night" in his Symphony No. 2, nicknamed the Christmas Symphony.

== Star singers ==
In Austria, Belgium and Germany, Epiphany, the last feast of the Christmas season, is marked by star singers, children dressing as the Three Kings, carrying a star on a pole. Going from house to house from New Year's Day to 6 January, the children sing religious songs and collect money for charity. They are often rewarded with extra sweets or money.

== By country ==
=== Australia, South Africa and New Zealand ===
In Australia, South Africa and New Zealand, where it is the middle of summer at Christmas, there is a tradition of Carols by Candlelight concerts held outdoors at night in cities and towns across the country, during the weeks leading up to Christmas. First held in Melbourne, "Carols by Candlelight" is held each Christmas Eve in capital cities and many smaller cities and towns around Australia. Performers at the concerts include opera singers, musical theatre performers and popular music singers. People in the audience hold lit candles and join in singing some of the carols in accompaniment with the celebrities. Similar events are now held all over Australia, usually arranged by churches, municipal councils, or other community groups. They are normally held on Christmas Eve or the Sunday or weekend before Christmas. A similar recent trend in South Africa and New Zealand are for smaller towns to host their own Carols by Candlelight concerts.

William Garnet "Billy" James (1892–1977) wrote music for Christmas carol lyrics written by John Wheeler (both men worked for the Australian Broadcasting Commission). These referred to the hot dry December of the Australian outback, dancing brolgas (a native Australian crane), and similar Australian features.

==== Christmas music composed by Australians ====
- 1852 Christmas Present Polka by John Howson
- 1862 Hymn for Christmas-Day by James Johnson
- 1862 All My Heart This Night Rejoices by Charles E Horsley
- 1863 Australian Christmas Song by Ernesto Spagnoletti
- 1864 Christmas in Australia by George Tolhurst
- 1866 Victorian Christmas Waltz by Cesare Cutolo
- 1870 Christmas Anthem by Paolo Giorza
- 1883 Song of the Angels by Charles Sandys Packer
- 1890 Oh, lovely voices of the sky by Alfred Plumpton
- 1899 While all things were in quiet silence by Henry John King
- 1900 In the Cathedral by George S De Chaneet
- 1900 Yuletide Gavotte by John Albert Delaney
- 1908 Australian Christmas Carol by Joseph Summers
- 1910 My Little Christmas Belle by Joe Slater
- 1910 Star of the East by August Juncker
- 1929 The Night of Fear Is Over by Fritz Hart

=== Canada ===
The "Huron Carol" (or "Twas in the Moon of Wintertime") is a Canadian Christmas hymn (Canada's oldest Christmas song), written probably in 1642 by Jean de Brébeuf, a Jesuit missionary at Sainte-Marie among the Hurons in Canada.

=== Finland ===
In accordance with a medieval tradition, the Christmas Peace is declared every year on Christmas Eve in Porvoo, Finland, with a local band and male choir performing Christmas carols.

=== France ===
- In 1535, a 16th-century carol, "Ça, Bergers, assemblons nous", was sung aboard Jacques Cartier's ship on Christmas Day.
- In 1554, a collection of French carols, La Grande Bible des Noëls, was printed in Orléans.
- In 1703, another collection, Chants des Noëls Anciens et Modernes, was printed by Christophe Ballard (1641–1715), in Paris.
- Dating from the 18th century, "Les Anges Dans Nos Campagnes" (known as "Angels We Have Heard On High" in English) is another famous French carol.
- The 19th-century "Cantique de Noël" (also known as "Minuit, chrétiens", adapted as "O Holy Night" in English) is another classic.

"Dans cette étable" and "Venez Divin Messie" are also popular Christmas carols. Perhaps the best known traditional French carol, "Il est né, le divin Enfant", comes from the region of Provence.

=== Germany, Austria and Switzerland ===
Some carols familiar in English are translations of German Christmas songs (Weihnachtslieder). Pastoral Weihnachtslieder are sometimes called Hirtenlieder ("shepherd songs"). Martin Luther wrote the carol "Vom Himmel hoch, da komm ich her", which can be acted as a play of the Christmas story. He also wrote "Gelobet seist du, Jesu Christ" and "Christum wir sollen loben schon". The carol "Vom Himmel hoch, o Engel, kommt" was written by Friedrich Spee in 1622 to an older melody, a lullaby singing "of Jesus and Mary", and for peace.

Two well-known later examples are "O Tannenbaum" (O Christmas tree), from a German folksong arranged by Ernst Anschütz and "Stille Nacht" ("Silent Night") by the Austrians Franz Xaver Gruber and Joseph Mohr. The carol most familiar in German besides those two is probably the 19th-century "O du fröhliche".

Other popular and widely sung Christmas carols are "Herbei, o ihr Gläub'gen", which is a German version of "Adeste fideles" (English: "O Come, All Ye Faithful"), Alle Jahre wieder ("Every year again"), Es ist ein Ros entsprungen (lit: "A rose has sprung up"), "Leise rieselt der Schnee" "(Silently the snow is falling)", "Tochter Zion, freue dich" (Daughter Zion, rejoice) and "Es ist für uns eine Zeit angekommen" ("Unto us a time has come").

"Lasst uns froh und munter sein" ("Let us be happy and cheerful"), "Kling, Glöckchen", ("Ring, Little Bell"), "Ihr Kinderlein, kommet" ("Oh, come, little children") and "Schneeflöckchen, Weißröckchen" (lit.: "tiny snowflake, white, tiny skirt") are popular German songs introduced in Kindergarten and primary school. Ingeborg Weber-Kellermann wrote a scientific book on German Christmas carols which is also a song book.

=== Greece and Cyprus ===
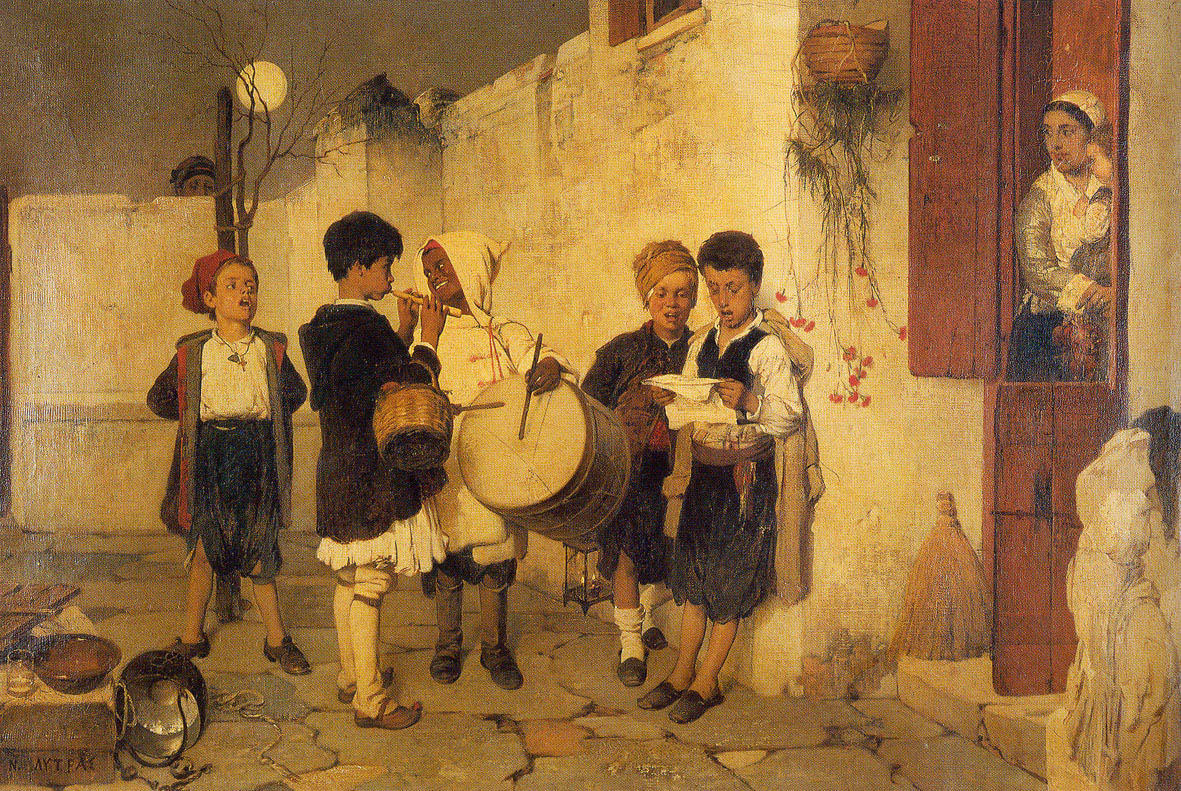
Nikiphoros Lytras, Carols, 1872

==== Custom ====
Greek tradition calls for children to go out with triangles from house to house on Christmas Eve, New Year's Eve and Epiphany Eve, and sing the corresponding folk carols, called the Kalanta or Kalanda or Kalanta Christougenon, the word deriving from the Roman calends). There are separate carols for each of the three great feasts, referring respectively to the Nativity, to St. Basil and the New Year, and to the Baptism of Jesus in the River Jordan, along with wishes for the household. In addition to the carols for the winter festive season, there are also the springtime or Lenten carols, commonly called the "Carols of Lazarus", sung on the Saturday before Palm Sunday as a harbinger of the Resurrection of Christ to be celebrated a week later.

In older times, caroling children asked for and were given edible gifts such as dried fruit, eggs, nuts or sweets; during the 20th century this was gradually replaced with money gifts – ranging from small change in the case of strangers to considerable amounts in the case of close relatives. Caroling is also done by marching bands, choirs, school students seeking to raise funds for trips or charity, members of folk societies, or merely by groups of well-wishers. Many internationally known carols, e.g. "Silent Night" and "O Tannenbaum", are also sung in Greek translation.

==== Variants ====
Many carols are regional, being popular in specific regions but unknown in others, whereas some are popular throughout the two countries. Examples of the latter are the Peloponnesian Christmas carol "Christoúgenna, Prōtoúgenna" ("Christmas, Firstmas"), the Constantinopolitan Christmas carol "Kalēn hespéran, árchontes" ("Good evening, lords"), and the New Year's carol "Archimēniá ki archichroniá" ("First of the month, first of the year"). The oldest known carol, commonly referred to as the "Byzantine Carol" (Byzantine Greek: Άναρχος θεός καταβέβηκεν, Ánarkhos Theós katabébēken, "God, who has no beginning, descended"), is linguistically dated to the beginning of the High Middle Ages, ca. 1000 AD; it is traditionally associated with the city of Kotyora in the Pontos (modern-day Ordu, Turkey).

==== Form ====
Most carols follow a more or less standard format: they begin by exalting the relevant religious feast, then proceed to offer praises for the lord and lady of the house, their children, the household and its personnel, and usually conclude with a polite request for a treat, and a promise to come back next year for more well-wishing. Almost all the various carols are in the common dekapentasyllabos (15-syllable iamb with a caesura after the 8th syllable) verse, which means that their wording and tunes are easily interchangeable. This has given rise to a great number of local variants, parts of which often overlap or resemble one another in verse, tune, or both. Nevertheless, their musical variety remains very wide overall: for example carols from Epirus are strictly pentatonic, in the kind of drone polyphony practised in the Balkans, and accompanied by C-clarinets and fiddles; just across the straits, on Corfu Island, the style is tempered harmonic polyphony, accompanied by mandolins and guitars. Generally speaking, the musical style of each carol closely follows the secular music tradition of each region.

=== Italy ===
The most popular Italian Christmas carol is "Tu scendi dalle stelle", written in 1732 by Saint Alphonsus Liguori.

=== Philippines ===
Christmas carols in predominantly Catholic Philippines exhibit the influence of indigenous, Hispanic and American musical traditions, reflecting the country's complex history. Carollers (Tagalog: Namamaskô) begin wassailing in November, with mostly children and young adults participating in the custom.

=== Poland ===
Christmas carols are very popular in Poland, where they have a long history, the oldest dating to the 15th century or earlier. There is a tradition of singing Christmas carols until 2 February which is celebrated by western Christians as the Feast of the Presentation of Jesus at the Temple. Among the most prominent Polish carols are God Is Born (Bóg się rodzi), Midst Quiet Night (Wśród nocnej ciszy), Miserable, Quiet (Mizerna cicha) and Infant Holy, Infant Lowly (W żłobie leży).

=== Romania ===
During the Socialist Republic of Romania in the 20th century, Christmas carols were banned by the government of Ceausescu. Days following the Romanian Revolution in 1989, Christmas carols were sung for the first time in 42 years.

=== Spain and Portugal ===
The villancico (or vilancete in Portuguese) was a common poetic and musical form of the Iberian Peninsula and Latin America popular from the late 15th to 18th centuries. With the decline in popularity of the villancicos in the 20th century, the term became reduced to mean merely "Christmas carol". Important composers of villancicos were Juan del Encina, Pedro de Escobar, Francisco Guerrero, Gaspar Fernandes and Juan Gutiérez de Padilla. Popular Spanish villancicos include "Los pastores a Belén" and "Riu, riu, chiu: El lobo rabioso" and "Los peces en el río".

==== Andorra and Catalan-speaking territories ====
The Nadala or Cançó de Nadal (in plural nadales) are a popular group of songs, usually requiring a chorus, that are song from Advent until Epiphany. Their written versions starts in the 15th century. In the past were usually being song by shepherds and their families in market squares and in front of churches.

The Nadala origins are uncertain but usually cited to be related with the Montseny and Pedraforca mountains in Catalonia (by the counties of Osona and Girona). As quite a few have references to mythological events and powers, some authors claim that they contain part of the religion that was present in the territory before Christianity arrived as it was kept alive in these mountainous regions.

The nadala is usually paired with the caramella, being one for the winter solstice events while the other to the spring equinox.

=== Ukraine ===
Ukrainian Christmas carols are named kolyadka (Ukrainian: колядки). They were originally sung to celebrate the birth of the Sun (winter solstice). After the incorporation into Christianity, their theme has been shifted to Christmas, celebrating the birth of Jesus Christ.

The Ukrainian carol most known in the Western world is the "Carol of the Bells", with English lyrics by the American composer of Ukrainian descent Peter J. Wilhousky, composed by the Ukrainian composer Mykola Leontovych as "Shchedryk", and premiered in December 1916 by a choral group made up of students at Kyiv University. Although it is a Christmas carol in Wilhousky's English lyrics, in original Ukrainian lyrics it is a Generous Eve carol (shchedrivka, Ukrainian: щедрівка), having nothing with Christianity.

=== United States ===
Christmas music performed in the United States ranges from popular songs, such as "Jingle Bells", to Christmas carols, such as "Away in a Manger", "O Little Town of Bethlehem", and numerous others of varying genres. Church and college choirs celebrate with special programs and online recordings.

== See also ==
- List of Christmas carols
