= Shchedryk (song) =

1916 Ukrainian song by Mykola Leontovych

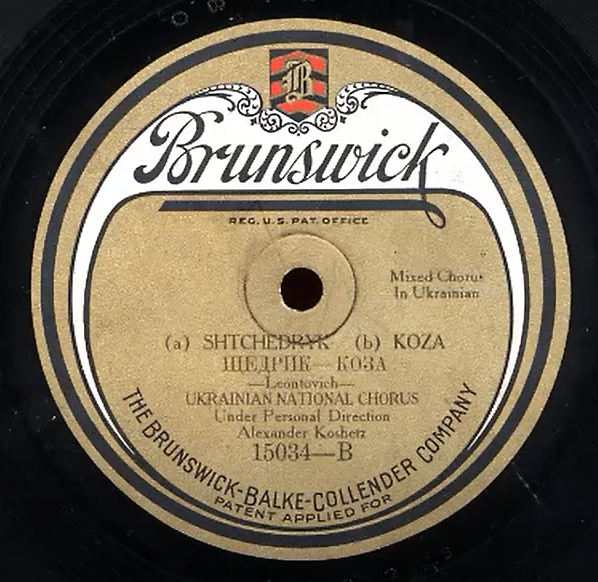
- Disc label for the 1922 recording of "Shchedryk" by the Ukrainian National Choir

Song
- Language: Ukrainian
- Released: 1901 (first version); 1919 (final revision)
- Songwriter: Mykola Leontovych

"Shchedryk" (Щедрик, from Ukrainian: Щедрий вечiр, lit. 'Bountiful Evening') is a Ukrainian 'shchedrivka', or New Year celebration song, known in English as "The Little Swallow". The song tells a story of a swallow flying into a household at New Year to sing of the wealth that will come with the following spring. "Shchedryk" was sung during koliada on the night of 31 December, New Year's Eve in the Julian calendar (13 January in the Gregorian Calendar), known in Ukraine as Malanka. The song was arranged by the Ukrainian composer Mykola Leontovych between 1901 and 1919 with early performances of the piece being performed by students at Kyiv University.

It was made into a Christmas carol, "Carol of the Bells", by the American composer and educator Peter J. Wilhousky. Following a performance of Leontovych's composition by Alexander Koshetz's Ukrainian National Chorus at Carnegie Hall on 5 October, 1922, Wilhousky published his own lyrics for the melody and secured a copyright on his lyrics in 1936. The music has since become strongly associated with Christmas.

== History ==
=== Origin ===
The ostinato motif of "Shchedryk"

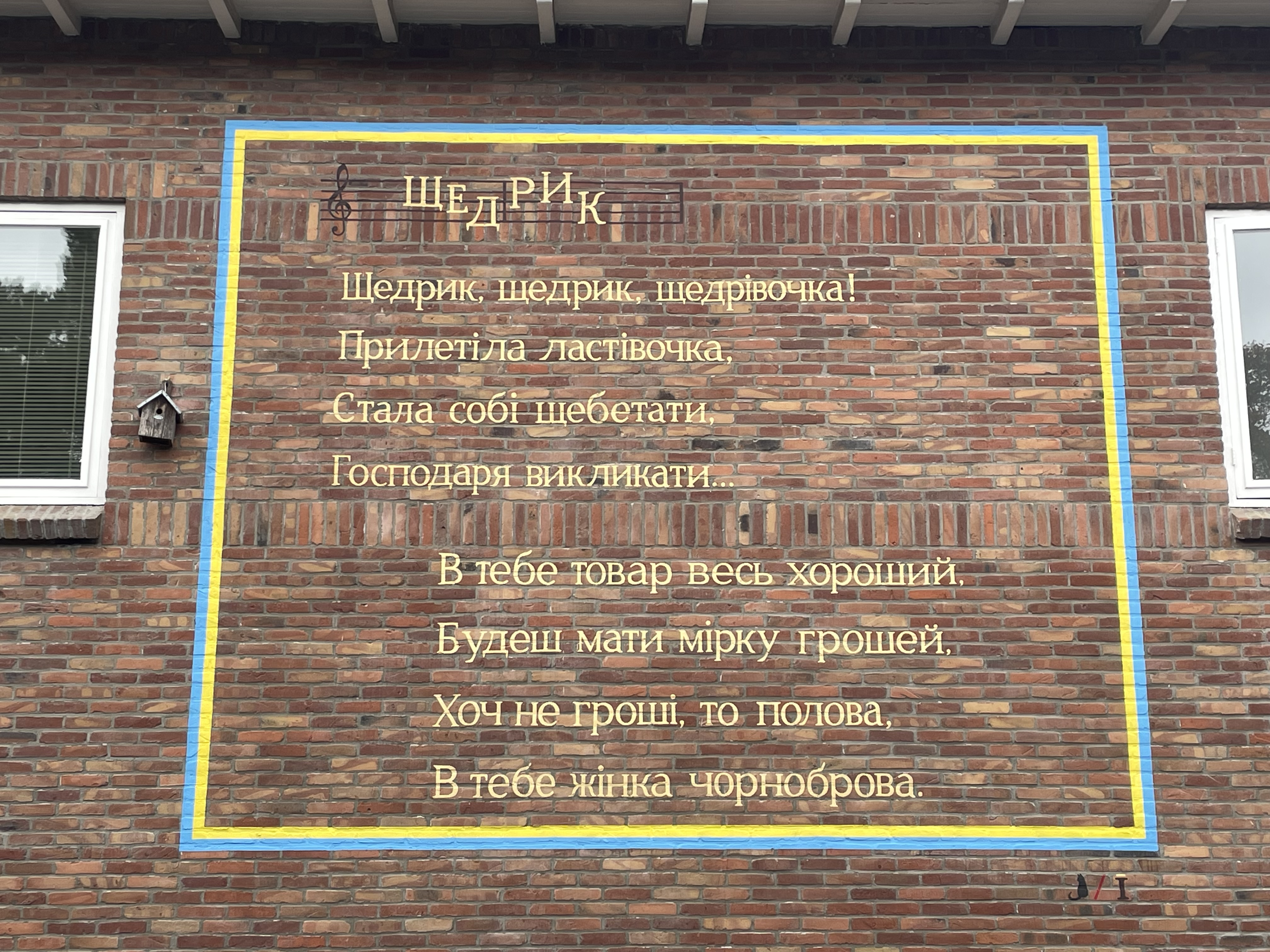
Shchedryk on a wall in Leiden (2025)

"Shchedryk" ('Bountiful Evening') is a Ukrainian shchedrivka, or New Year celebration song, known in English as "The Little Swallow". It tells of a swallow flying into a home to proclaim that the family will enjoy a plentiful and bountiful year. The title is derived from the Ukrainian word for "bountiful". The song is based on a traditional folk song whose language was thought to have magical properties. The traditional Ukrainian text used a device known as hemiola in the rhythm (alternating the accents within each measure from 3/4 to 6/8 and back again). The chant based on an ostinato four-note pattern within the range of a minor third is thought to be of prehistoric origins, predating the introduction of Christianity. It was associated with the coming New Year that was celebrated in Ukraine in March. Conceptually, the Ukrainian lyrics of this song meet the definition of a shchedrivka, while the English content of "The Little Swallow" identifies it as a koliadka.

With the introduction of Christianity to Ukraine, the celebration of the New Year was moved from March to January and "Shchedryk" became associated with the Feast of Epiphany, also known in Ukrainian as Shchedryi vechir. The song was then sung on the night of New Year's Eve in the Julian Calendar (corresponding to 13 January on the Gregorian Calendar), which is Shchedryi vechir. In modern Ukraine, the song is again sung on the eve of the Julian New Year (January 13). The folk melody was one of many "well-wishing songs" performed across Ukraine on 13 January, often by girls who went singing from house to house, and were given treats.

=== Composition by Leontovych ===
"Shchedryk"
A recording of "Shchedryk", with the original words in Ukrainian, performed by the "Ukrainian National Choir" (Ukrainian Republic Capella) in New York in 1922

The conductor Alexander Koshetz commissioned the Ukrainian composer and teacher Mykola Leontovych to write a song based on Ukrainian folk melodies for a Christmas concert. Using the four notes and the original folk lyrics of a well-wishing song he found in an anthology of Ukrainian folk melodies, Leontovych created a new choral work. The four-note melody over a minor third of the chant was used by him as an ostinato theme in several arrangements Leontovych composed. "Shchedryk" is the most famous of all his songs.

A choir in Odesa Ukraine singing Shchedryk in 2017

"Shchedryk" is incorrectly said to have been first performed by students at Kyiv University on 25 December 1916. However, the song was first performed on 29 December 1916 in the Kyiv Merchants' Assembly Hall, now part of the National Philharmonic of Ukraine. The arrangement for an a cappella mixed voice choir was popularised by the Ukrainian Republic Capella directed by Koshetz when it toured Europe in 1920 and 1921 under the auspices of the newly independent Ukrainian government, with the task of promoting Ukrainian music abroad. The chorus performed more than 1000 concerts in Europe, North America, and South America. The first recording was made in New York in October 1922 for Brunswick Records.

=== "Carol of the Bells" ===
After "Shchedryk" was performed by Alexander Koshetz's Ukrainian National Chorus for the first time at Carnegie Hall 5 October, 1922, the song was adapted as an English Christmas carol, "Carol of the Bells", by the American composer and educator Peter J. Wilhousky of NBC Radio. Wilhousky published and copyrighted his new lyrics—which were not based on the Ukrainian lyrics—in 1936. In the late 1930s, a number of Wilhousky's choirs began to perform his arrangement of the song at Christmas. Thereafter, the song became popular in the English-speaking world, where it became strongly associated with Christmas.

Although "Carol of the Bells" uses the melody from "Shchedryk", the lyrics of these two songs have nothing in common. The ostinato of the Ukrainian song suggested to Wilhousky the sound of ringing bells, so he wrote lyrics on that theme. Several other lyricists have written for the same melody, usually retaining Wilhousky's bell theme. A 1947 version, "Ring, Christmas Bells", has become a Christian devotional song. There is an English adaptation of the original Ukrainian by Stepan Pasicznyk.

== Lyrics ==
Ukrainian lyrics

Щедрик, щедрик, щедрівочка,
Прилетіла ластівочка,
Стала собі щебетати,
Господаря викликати.
Вийди, вийди, господарю,
Подивися на кошару.
Там овечки покотились,
А ягнички народились.
В тебе товар весь хороший,
Будеш мати мірку грошей,
Хоч не гроші, то полова,
В тебе жінка чорноброва.
Хоч не гроші, то полова,
В тебе жінка чорноброва.

Transliteration (BGN/PCGN)

Shchedryk, shchedryk, shchedrivochka,
Pryletila lastivochka,
Stala sobi shchebetaty,
Hospodaria vyklykaty:
Vyidy, vyidy, hospodariu,
Podyvysia na kosharu,
Tam ovechky pokotylys,
A yahnychky narodylys.
V tebe tovar ves khoroshyi,
Budesh maty mirku hroshei,
Khoch ne hroshi, to polova,
V tebe zhinka chornobrova,
Khoch ne hroshi, to polova.
V tebe zhinka chornobrova.

English translation

Bountiful evening, bountiful evening,
The swallow has flown in,
She began to chirp,
To call the host.
Come out, come out, good host,
Look at the sheepfold.
The sheep have rolled over,
And the lambs have been born.
Your goods are all good,
You will have a measure of money,
If not money, then a half-sheaf,
You have a black-browed wife.
If not money, then a half-sheaf,
You have a black-browed wife.

== In popular culture ==
Originally a New Year celebration song, "Shchedryk" is not a popular Christmas song in Ukraine, unlike elsewhere in the world where the introduction of the Wilhousky lyrics became popularized since the late 1930s. Instead, in Ukraine its association with the new year is retained and the song is more often performed on the eve of the Julian Calendar new year.

Shchedryk, from the 1930 film "Song of the Flame"

It was used in the partially lost 1930 American film "Song of the Flame", which takes place during the Russian Revolution. The song is played during a scene in a harvest festival, and sung by a choir.

The Family Guy episode "Deep Throats" contains a scene where Peter Griffin sings a song to the same tune as "Shchedryk" while performing a part-time job.

"Shchedryk" was covered by Ukrainian rock band Vopli Vidopliassova in 2012.

"Shchedryk" was used in the 2016 film Hunt for the Wilderpeople, and in the 2024 horror film Immaculate, just as Sister Cecilia gives birth. In the Christmas scene of the 2022 Ukrainian historical drama film Carol of the Bells, children are caroling and singing "Shchedryk". The role of the song in the film is as a symbol of peace, hope, and faith for a better future.

Because of the Russian invasion of Ukraine, at the second semifinal of the Eurovision Song Contest 2023 that was held in the UK city of Liverpool rather than in Ukraine, the song was sung by the Ukrainian singers Zlata Dziunka and Mariya Yaremchuk.
