= Shchedryk =

Shchedryk may refer to:

- "Shchedryk" (song), a traditional Ukrainian song, the source of the tune of the English-language Christmas carol "Carol of the Bells"
- Shchedryk (choir), a professional Ukrainian Children's Choir
- Carol of the Bells (film), а Ukrainian historical drama film directed by Olesia Morhunets-Isaienko, also known as Shchedryk
