= Alexander Koshetz =

Ukrainian conductor, composer, ethnographer, writer, and musicologist (1875–1944)

- Олександр Антонович Кошиць
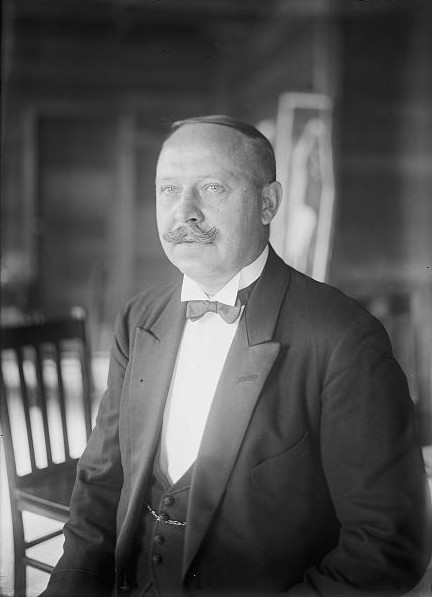
- Alexander Koshetz
- Born: Oleksandr Antonovych Koshyts; September 12, 1875; Romashky, Kiev Governorate, Russian Empire (now Ukraine)
- Died: September 21, 1944 (aged 69); Winnipeg, Manitoba, Canada
- Education: Kiev Theological Academy
- Occupations: Conductor, composer, arranger, ethnographer, writer, musicologist, lecturer
- Years active: 1901-1944
- Known for: Promotion of Shchedryk; Ukrainian Republican Capella
- Spouse: Tetyana Koshetz (m. 1917)

Alexander Antonovich Koshetz (Russian: Александр Антонович Кошиц; also transliterated as Oleksandr Antonovych Koshyts (Ukrainian: Олександр Антонович Кошиць); 12 September 1875 – 21 September 1944) was a Ukrainian choral conductor, arranger, composer, ethnographer, writer, musicologist, and lecturer. Koshetz built a prominent conducting career in Kyiv, before going on to be one of the most prominent international promoters of Ukrainian music worldwide. He is best known for his promotion of Mykola Leontovych's "Shchedryk", the precursor to the Christmas song Carol of the Bells, during his worldwide tour with the Ukrainian Republican Capella.

Koshetz was born in the Kiev Governorate into a family of priests, but deviated from his family into a musical career and attended the Kiev Theological Academy. At the academy, he helped promote fellow Ukrainian composer Artemy Vedel as the student-conductor of the academy choir, which placed him among the first in the 20th century to revive Vedel's music after censorship. He then went on to teach choral music until 1917 with the formation of the Ukrainian People's Republic, and in 1919 was asked by Symon Petliura to co-head to Ukrainian Republican Capella, an ensemble tasked with raising awareness of the Ukrainian cause abroad through a world concert tour. The Capella performed 207 concerts across 74 halls throughout Europe before embarking on a tour of the Americas that covered over 400 concerts in more than 150 cities across the area. It was during this tour at Carnegie Hall in the United States on 5 October 1922 that Koshehtz introduced Mykola Leontovych's "Shchedryk" to American audiences. This performance was later adapted by American composer Peter J. Wilhousky in 1936 into the widely known Christmas song "Carol of the Bells".

Following the collapse of the Ukrainian People's Republic, the Ukrainian Republican Capella also ceased to exist without state aid quotas, and Koshetz was barred from returning to the now Soviet-controlled Ukraine. He resettled in New York City in 1926, where he continued to compose, arrange, and record Ukrainian music to promote to an international audience. He spent his later years teaching in Winnipeg, Canada, where he died in 1944 in exile. He has since been commemorated by the O. Koshetz Choir in Winnipeg, and has had numerous streets, coins, and plaques named after him in Ukraine.

== Early life and education ==
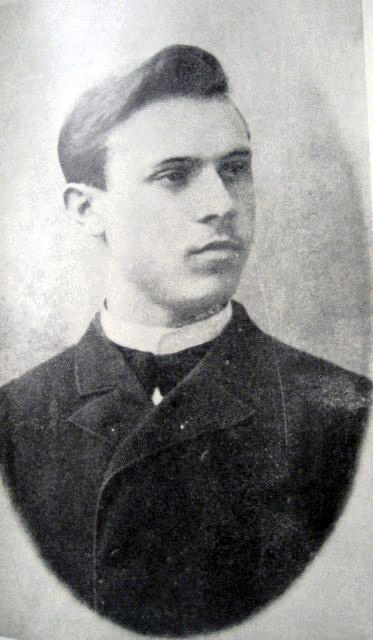
Koshetz during his time as a student at the Kiev Theological Academy, 1895.

Koshetz was born on 12 September 1875 the village of Romashky in Kiev Governorate, Russian Empire (now Obukhiv Raion, Kyiv Oblast, Ukraine). His father, Anton Hnatovych Koshyts, was a priest who descended from a long line of priests himself. When Koshetz turned two, his father became the priest for the parish of the village of Tarasivka (now in Zvenyhorodka Raion, Cherkasy Oblast), which is near Kyrylivka (famous for being the hometown of Taras Shevchenko). One of Oleksandr's relatives, Hryhorii Koshetz, in fact, was Shevchenko's parish priest and employer at one time and had a daughter named Todosya whom Shevchenko attempted to start a relationship with but was denied. According to Oleksandr, while he did not know Shevchenko personally, he did know Shevchenko's nephew, Petro, and was friends with Petro's son, Hryhoriy. As a child, he attended the bursa, a type of theological boarding school, in the city of Bohuslav near Kiev. In Bohuslav, he first became interested in music, and he said he "began to quietly compose" there.

Immediately upon graduating from the bursa, he attended the Kiev Theological Academy. At the school, he was part of the small seminary orchestra and the choir, which performed predominantly Ukrainian repertoire. He also individually recorded folk songs, which he would arrange for the choir and then perform with the seminarians. He graduated from the seminary in 1896, he worked briefly as a teacher in the parish school of Hruzke. He later recalled in his memoir that he only took the teaching post because he did not want to do military service or take on a state position or even become a priest. He was recommended to the post by his older brother Mytrofan, a priest for the village of Kozychanka at the time, who was friends with the village priest for Hruzke, Mykhailo Stelmashenko. However, he had a difficult time in the village, as he frequently clashed with Stelmashenko, whom he thought was arrogant and conceited, and wanted to go back to Kiev, calling it an inevitable death to stay there in the village. He, however, did establish a choir in the short time he was there for the school.

In 1897, he returned to the Kiev Theological Academy in order to receive a graduate-level theological education and to stay in Kiev. At the academy, he served as the student-conductor of the Academy Choir, which became a leading choir of the institution. He mainly performed works by fellow Ukrainian composer, Artemy Vedel, whom Koshetz deeply admired. By doing this, he was among the first in the 20th century to help revive Vedel's music, which was frequently censored and banned by Russian authorities. On 25 June 1901 he graduated with the academic degree of Candidate of Theology, which was confirmed by, per tradition, the Metropolitan of Kiev, Theognostus. He also collected Ukrainian folk songs from central Ukrainian areas (notably around Kiev itself). His candidate thesis was entitled "Monastic Obikhodnyks of the 16th–17th Centuries and Their Significance in the History of the Church Charter". The thesis is currently preserved by the Institute of Manuscripts of the National Library of Ukraine (IR NBUV).

== Early career ==
Koshetz conducting the Ukrainian National Chorus in a performance of the Ukrainian national anthem in 1917.

Following his graduation with a Candidate of Theology degree, he went to the city of Stavropol. There, he worked as a teacher at the Theological Women’s Gymnasium. On the recommendation of Mykola Lysenko, the Kuban Statistical Committee suggested to Koshetz of the idea of undertaking a trip through the Cossack settlements within the modern Russian area of Kuban in order to record the folk songs of the area. While teaching, he did this from 1903 to 1905. Koshetz specially set out to see whether musical traditions of the Dnieper Cossacks are still present in their descendants, the Kuban Cossacks, who resettled there following the dissolution of the Zaporozhian Sich. During this time, he recorded and submitted over 400 recordings to the committee, which, in 1908, earned him a gold medal from the Ethnographic Economic Exhibition of Kuban. However, most of these recordings have not survived, as the notebooks he kept them in later disappeared, with only a small portion being rescued from drafts. One notebook was found in his archive in Winnipeg, Canada, and another is known to exist in Kuban, which was found by Ivan Varavva, a prominent literary writer from the area.

In 1904, Koshetz returned to Kiev from Stavropol. He worked various teaching jobs upon returning: at his alma mater (the Kiev Theological Academy), the Second Women's School, and also the First Commercial School. Later that year, Mykola Lysenko's Music and Drama School was founded, and he accepted Lysenko's personal invitation to teach there. He led a choral singing class at the school. While teaching, he also attended the composition classes of Professor Hryhoriy Lyubomirskyi, who taught at the school, and Koshetz began conducting the "Boyan" Society at the school too. In 1908, he took on the larger role of conducting the choir of students at Taras Shevchenko National University of Kyiv and left teaching. During this time, the fame of the conductor grew astronomically. After the choir received the first prize from the audience at the city of Kiev's opera theater in 1909, he began performing with choirs in the halls of the National Philharmonic of Ukraine, promoting the works of Ukrainian, Russian, and Western European classics.

In 1911 he started teaching choral music at the Kiev's Imperial Conservatory of Music upon the invitation by the administration of the Imperial Music School. A year later, Mykola Sadovsky invited Koshetz to be the conductor of the Sadovsky Theatre Orchestra, where he helped stage the operas by Lysenko, Denys Sichynsky, and Stanisław Moniuszko. He then served as conductor and choirmaster of the Kiev Opera starting in 1916. From 1916 to 1917 he was choirmaster and conductor of the Kyiv Opera. He later called that the opera had a "creative swamp" and he did not like his time there, and quickly left the position as a result. According to research by Rice University, Koshetz was the one who commissioned Mykola Leontovych to write a song using Ukrainian folk melodies around this time, which would later become known as Shchedryk.

== Ukrainian Republican Capella ==
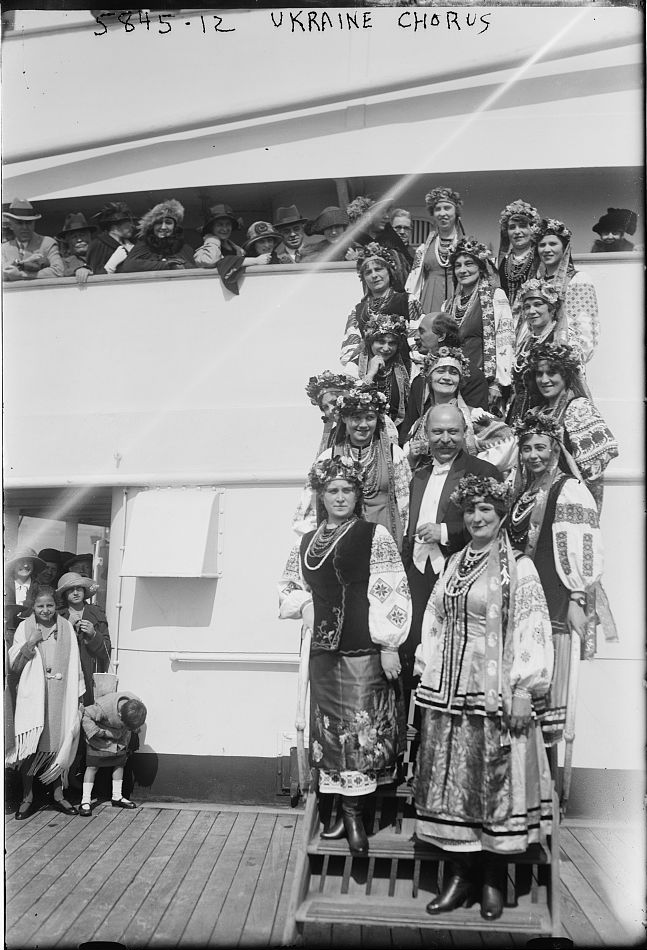
Koshetz with the Ukrainian National Chorus, c. 1922-1924

In 1917, he was invited to be a member of the Musical Theatre Commission by the Central Rada in the newly formed Ukrainian People's Republic. Two years later, the Chairman of the Directorate, Symon Petliura, on 1 January 1919 he was invited with Kyrylo Stetsenko to head the Ukrainian Republican Capella. It was proposed that the capella have a select program created by the two, and give a grand concert tour around the world to raise awareness about the Ukrainian cause.

The Capella's first tour after its founding by Petliura was in Czechoslovakia. However, they were not initially received well. Members of the group were arrested upon arrival in Uzhhorod under bayonet escort, reflecting widespread Russian propaganda at the time that denied Ukraine was a nation. After making it to Prague, they were again stripped and searched. In May, they gave their first concert at the National Theatre in Prague, which was attended by members of the UNR diplomatic mission. The concert marked the first world premiere of "Shchedryk" (earlier premieres had been made in Kyiv in 1916). Shchedryk would later become the most well-known of the capella's repertoire due to its widespread praise, with German academics calling it "the sweetest of poisons", Punch called it a beautiful piece, and Warsaw's press comparing it to Homer. Czech composer Jaroslav Křička, who initially was hostile to the Ukrainians, also reversed his views upon hearing it. The Capella also began keeping a "memorial book" of notable figures and their impressions of the Capella, which included many important people at the time. The Czechoslovak tour would end in July and return briefly from August to October 1920, in total having over 30 concerts in Czechoslovakia.

After touring Czechoslovakia, the tour route would go through Poland, Switzerland, France, Belgium, and the Netherlands, among other countries. The tour would become so famous that the Queen of the Belgians, Elisabeth of Bavaria stated that her sympathies were with the Ukrainian people upon hearing it. In 1920, the Ukrainian Republican Capella was reorganized into the newly named "Ukrainian National Choir". The European leg of the tour eventually ended in 1921, with a total of 207 concerts across 74 concert halls. They then went on a tour of the Americas. In total, across the Americas, over 400 concerts were done in the USA, Canada, Mexico, Uruguay, Argentina, and Brazil across 150 cities until 1924. On 5 February 1923, Petliura wrote a letter to Koshetz, calling Capella's work historic and praising the ensemble for spreading the idea of a Ukrainian nation across the world. The Capella, however, in 1924 formally ceased to exist due to financial difficulties following the collapse of the UPR. The last state aid quota was given to the Capella in January 1921 when they were in Warsaw, after which the government went into exile. Petliura, however, had still been hoping for support in 1922, and contacted Koshetz to appeal to the Ukrainians abroad.

The performance of Shchedryk that later led to Peter J. Wilhousky's famous adaptation into the Carol of the Bells occurred on 5 October 1922 in Carnegie Hall in the United States. In 1936, Wilhousky, an arranger for the NBC Symphony Orchestra, rediscovered the performance when he was looking for music to air for the network on Christmas. He would then rewrite it into English-language lyrics, and it became immensely popular worldwide.

== Emigration ==
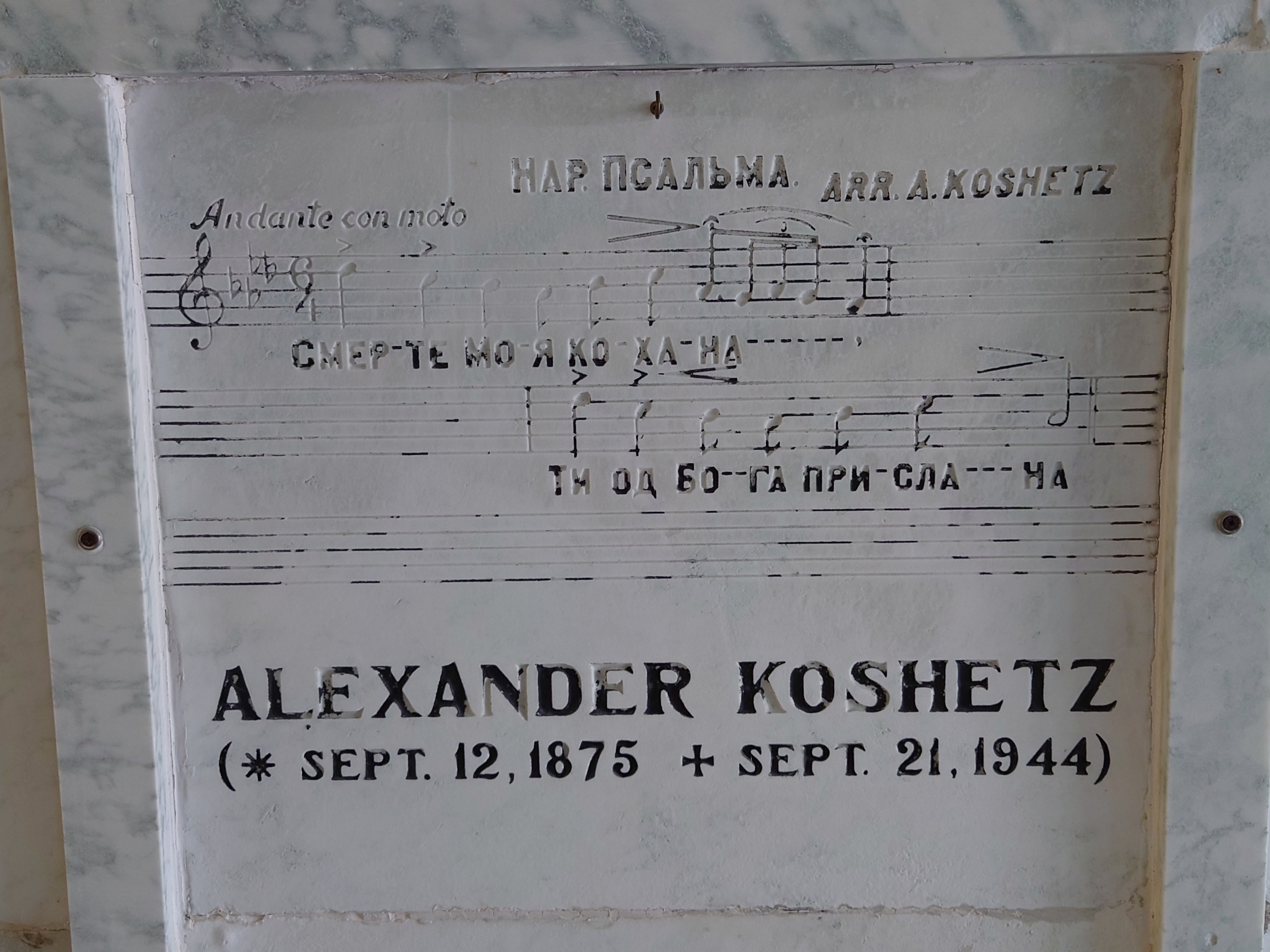
Alexander Koshetz's crypt

In 1926, barred from returning to Ukraine due to his support for the UPR following the Soviet victory in the Ukrainian War of Independence, he settled in New York in the United States. In May 1927, he attempted to appeal to the government of the Ukrainian SSR with a special request for permission to return to the region, but was refused. In the New York area, he supplemented his income by leading the "Seven", which was a group of seven Ukrainian church choirs in the area. Koshetz also documented the Ukrainian Republican Capella's travels in the memoir With Song, Around the World (З піснею через світ).

He also conducted music courses for conductors, etc. He composed church music (5 liturgies, some chants), and arranged folk songs. In New York, he continued to popularize Ukrainian music with his compositions, arrangements, and gramophone recordings, and the music publishing house Witmark & Son published massive editions of forty-two Ukrainian folk songs arranged by Oleksandr Koshyts in English.

From 1941 Koshetz spent the summer months teaching in Winnipeg, Manitoba, Canada, where he died in 1944 at age 69. About 5,000 people came to his funeral in Winnipeg. His body is buried at Glen Eden Cemetery, West St. Paul, Manitoba.

== Personal life ==
In 1917 Koshetz married a former student and singer in his choirs Tetyana Koshetz (1892–1966) who was later to become a vocalist in the Ukrainian National Chorus, voice teacher, and after 1944 curator of the Ukrainian Cultural and Educational Centre in Winnipeg.

== Commemoration ==
=== Within Canada ===
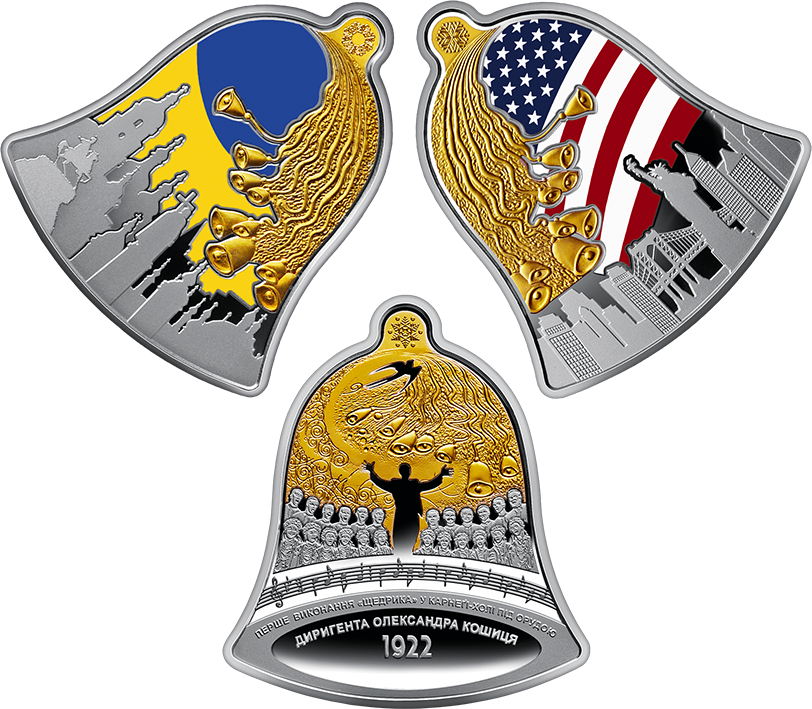
A set of commemorative coins by the National Bank of Ukraine (NBU) from 2023 commemorating Koshetz's performance of Shchedryk in 1922 in Carnegie Hall.

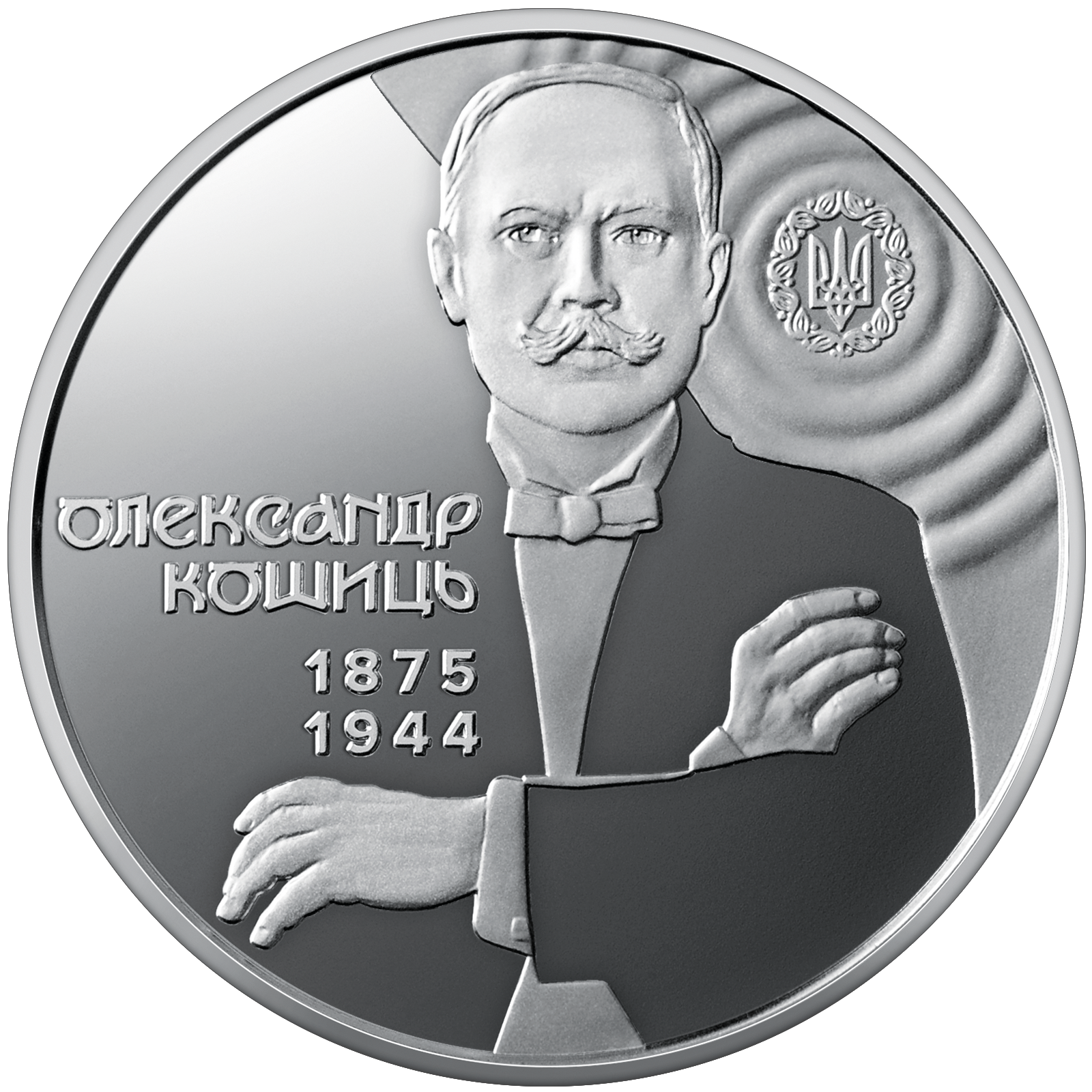
A 2 UAH commemorative coin (reverse side) by the NBU from 2025 commemorating the 150th anniversary of the birth of Koshetz.

The O. Koshetz Choir in Winnipeg has been named in his memory since 1967. Previously, it was known as the Winnipeg UNYF Choir from its inception in 1946, but it was decided to rename the choir for Canada's centennial and to honour Koshetz. A unique concert titled the Unknown Koshetz was produced at the University of Manitoba on 26 March 2006. The concert featured the Olexander Koshetz Choir of Winnipeg performing Koshetz "choral orchestrations" of music of Hawaii, Scotland, Afro-Americana, and First Nations, sung in both English and Ukrainian translations.

The personal archives of Alexander and Tetyana Koshetz remain at the Ukrainian Cultural and Educational Centre in Winnipeg, Manitoba, Canada.

=== Within Ukraine ===
On his 130th birthday, a commemorative concert was held in Uspenskyi Cathedral of Kyiv Pechersk Lavra by the best graduates of the Tchaikovsky National Music Academy under patronage of President Yuschenko and under blessing of Ukrainian Orthodox Church.

Since 1993, Surikov Street (named after Vasily Surikov) within the Shevchenkivskyi District of Lviv was renamed Koshytsya Street in honour of Koshetz. In December 2021, two commemorative plaques were unveiled on Andriivskyi Descent within Kyiv in honour of Koshetz. They were placed on the houses where Koshetz lived during his time in Kyiv.

In August 2022, the National Union of Writers of Ukraine proposed to close the Mikhail Bulgakov Museum in Kyiv and create a museum of the composer Oleksandr Koshyts instead.

In 2025, in honour of the 150th anniversary of the birth of Koshetz, the National Bank of Ukraine issued a commemorative coin worth 2 hryvnias and made of nickel silver in his honour. It had a circulation of up to 50,000 pieces and on the obverse had a composition symbolizing the tour route the Ukrainian Republican Capella took in the 1920s, and on the reverse a stylised portrait of Koshetz.

== Music ==
Although Koshetz was mostly known as a conductor, he also did his share of composing and arranging music. In the 1920s, after the creation of the Ukrainian Autocephalous Orthodox Church, Koshetz composed his liturgy, the Divine Liturgy of St. John Chrysostom, as well as ten Ukrainian religious chants. Later in emigration, he composed much more religious music.
