= Romashky =

Rural locality in Kyiv Oblast, Ukraine

Romashky Ромашки
- Location in Kyiv Oblast
- Coordinates: 49°54′33″N 31°16′34″E
- Country: Ukraine
- Oblast: Kyiv Oblast
- Raion: Obukhiv Raion
- Hromada: Rzhyshchiv urban hromada
- Time zone: UTC+2 (EET)
  - Summer (DST): UTC+3 (EEST)
- Postal code: 08810

Romashky (Ukrainian: Ромашки) is a village in the Rzhyshchiv urban hromada of the Obukhiv Raion of Kyiv Oblast in Ukraine.

== History ==
The village was founded in 1773.

On 19 July 2020, as a result of the administrative-territorial reform and liquidation of the Myronivka Raion, the village became part of the Obukhiv Raion.

== Religion ==
- Church of the Intercession (1843).

== Notable residents ==
- Alexander Koshetz (Oleksandr Koshyts; 1875–1944), Ukrainian choral conductor, arranger, composer, ethnographer, writer, musicologist, and lecturer
