= Carol of the Bells =

Christmas carol of Ukrainian origin

- Christmas carol by Mykola Leontovych
- The four-note motif (shown four times)
- Text: by Peter J. Wilhousky
- Based on: "Shchedryk"
- Composed: before 1916

"Carol of the Bells" is a popular Christmas carol, which is based on the Ukrainian New Years celebration song "Shchedryk". The music for the carol comes from the song written and arranged by the Ukrainian composer Mykola Leontovych between 1901 and 1916. English-language lyrics were written in 1936 by the American composer Peter Wilhousky.

The music is based on a four-note ostinato and is in 3/4 time signature, with the B-flat bell pealing in 6/8 time. The carol is metrically bistable (which means it is characterized by hemiola, or two different alternating meters), with a listener being able to focus on either meter or switch between them. It has been adapted for musical genres that include classical, heavy metal, jazz, country music, rock, trap, and pop. The music has been featured in films and television shows.

== Background ==
=== Origins ===
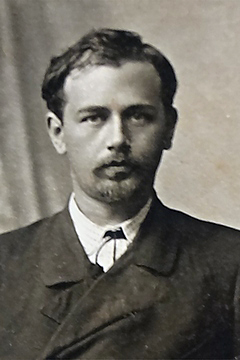
Mykola Leontovych

The conductor of the Ukrainian Republic Capella, Oleksander Koshyts, commissioned the Ukrainian composer Mykola Leontovych to create a song based on traditional Ukrainian folk music. The resulting choral composition, "Shchedryk", was based on a four-note motif Leontovych found in the Ukrainian anthology.

The original Ukrainian folk story related to the song was associated with the coming New Year that, prior to the introduction of Christianity, likely was celebrated in Ukraine in February or March, with the arrival of swallows, or with the spring equinox, in association with the coming of spring in April. The original Ukrainian title translates to "the generous one", or is perhaps derived from the Ukrainian word for bountiful (shchedryj), and tells a tale of a swallow flying into a household to proclaim the bountiful year that the family will have.

After the introduction of Christianity to Ukraine and the adoption of the Julian calendar the celebration of the new year was moved from April to January. The holiday with which the chant was originally associated became Malanka (Ukrainian: Щедрий вечір, Shchedry vechir), the eve of the Julian new year (the night of 13-14 January in the Gregorian calendar). The songs sung for this celebration are known as Shchedrivky.

Leontovych wrote the tune for the song while he was living and working in Pokrovsk (Eastern Ukraine) between 1904 and 1908. It was first performed by the Ukrainian students at Kyiv University in December 1916. It was introduced to Western audiences by the Ukrainian National Chorus during its 1919 concert tour of Europe. The tour was organized as a way to generate support for the fledgling independent nation of Ukraine, which had declared its independence, but which the Bolshevik government in Moscow refused to recognize.

The song premiered in the United States on October 5, 1922, to a sold-out audience at Carnegie Hall and the American audience fell in love with the Ukrainian song. The original work was intended to be sung a cappella by mixed four-voice choir.

Two other settings of the composition were also created by Leontovych: one for the women's choir (unaccompanied), and another for the children's choir with piano accompaniment. These two are rarely performed or recorded.

=== English lyrics versions ===
In 1936, Wilhousky rearranged the melody for the orchestra with new lyrics for NBC radio network's symphony orchestra, centred around the theme of bells because the melody reminded him of handbells, which begins "Hark! How the bells". It was first aired during the Great Depression. Wilhousky secured copyright to the new lyrics and the published song, despite the song having been published almost two decades earlier in the Ukrainian National Republic. Broad popularity of the song stemmed largely from Wilhousky's ability to reach a wide audience in his role as arranger for the NBC Symphony Orchestra. His adaptation is now strongly associated with Christmas because of his new lyrics that reference bells and caroling, and his line "merry, merry, merry, merry Christmas".

Carol of the Bells (Instrumental)
Instrumental arrangement of "Carol of the Bells"

"Ring, Christmas Bells", an English-language variant featuring nativity-based lyrics, was written by Minna Louise Hohman in 1947. Two other versions exist by anonymous writers: one from 1957 entitled "Come Dance and Sing" and one from 1972 that begins "Hark to the bells".

American recordings by various artists began to surface on the radio in the 1940s. The song gained further popularity when an instrumental was featured in television advertisements for André champagne in the 1970s. "Carol of the Bells" has been recorded in more than 150 versions and re-arrangements for varying vocal and instrumental compositions.

== Notable recordings ==
- 1962: The Ray Conniff album We Wish You a Merry Christmas included the "Ring Christmas Bells" version by Minna Louise Hohman.
- 1963: Carol of the Bells in an orchestral version, conducted by Leonard Bernstein, and New York Philharmonic Orchestra: on the LP The Joy of Christmas, also featuring The Mormon Tabernacle Choir, directed by Richard P. Condie, recorded in Salt Lake City, September 3, 1963.
- 1982: George Winston arranged and recorded a version of the carol for his solo piano album "December", which went on to sell over 3 million copies.
- 1988: Mannheim Steamroller recorded a prog-rock version on their second Christmas studio album A Fresh Aire Christmas, which has sold over 6 million copies in the U.S., making it one of the best-selling Christmas albums of all time.
- 1990: Wynton Marsalis recorded a syncopated version on the album Crescent City Christmas Card with the role of the bells carried by brass.
- 1990: Composer John Williams conducted a version for the Home Alone: Original Motion Picture Soundtrack. Williams' "Carol of the Bells" charted at number 86 on Billboard's Greatest of All Time Holiday 100 chart, which measured chart data 1958–2016.
- 1993: David Foster wrote a rendition for his album The Christmas Album. On Billboard's Greatest of All Time Holiday 100 chart, which measured chart data 1958–2016, Foster's take on "Carol of the Bells" charted at number 77.
- 1995: Savatage recorded "Christmas Eve/Sarajevo 12/24", an instrumental, heavy-metal medley of "God Rest Ye Merry, Gentlemen" and "Carol of the Bells". The song became the No. 1 requested song on the influential New York station WPLJ, which led to the band gaining label support to form Trans-Siberian Orchestra and create a new album based on the song.
- 2002: California Guitar Trio recorded a unique version where all instrumentation, voices, and bells were represented by guitars on their 2002 album, A Christmas Album.
- 2005: Nox Arcana performed this song on their album Winter's Knight that reached No. 8 on the Billboard Charts the following year.
- 2007: The Bird and the Bee released this song on a non-album single.
- 2007: Shawn Lee featured this song on his A Very Ping Pong Christmas: Funky Treats from Santa's Bag album. This version was used as a part of the soundtrack for the video game Bully: Scholarship Edition, in 2008.
- 2011: The Piano Guys published a cello arrangement of the song on YouTube, and it has garnered over 30 million views. A mashup arrangement of the song with "God Rest Ye Merry Gentlemen" was featured on their Christmas album A Family Christmas, which charted at No. 20 of US Billboard 200.
- 2012: Metal band August Burns Red's "breakdown-infused" version of the song was used in a Christmas-themed promotional ad for Frank Miller's film The Spirit, although the song did not appear in the film.
- 2012: Pentatonix covered the song on their album PTXmas, one of the highest selling Christmas albums of 2013.
- 2013: Marillion released an extended version for charity.
- 2013: Christopher Drake used the song as the Joker's main theme in Arkham Origins.
- 2016: Voctave performed this song a capella for their album "The Spirit of the Season". It was paired with Stephen Schwartz and Alan Menken's Christmas edition of "The Bells of Notre Dame", a musical number from Disney's 1996 animated blockbuster The Hunchback of Notre Dame.
- 2017: Lindsey Stirling released her version on her holiday album Warmer in the Winter.
- 2017: Lena Meyer-Landrut released her version on the official album to the television show Sing meinen Song – Das Weihnachtskonzert, Vol. 4.
- 2021: Mantikor released a German metal & rock version on the official Rookies & Friends, Vol. 3 XMAS Edition Compilation.
- 2021: In their 2021-2022 album, The War to End All Wars, the Swedish metal band Sabaton included a segment from Carol Of The Bells in the intro and outro segment of their song single "Christmas Truce".
- 2022: Composer Andrea Vanzo released a solo piano variation on the theme of "Carol of the Bells", as the debut single from his EP “Little Christmas Variations”.

== In popular culture ==
- The song appears in the 1990 film Home Alone as arranged by John Williams. In 2018, this version charted at No. 20 on the Swedish Heatseeker chart.
- The Muppets' 2009 parody of the song, climaxing with a large bell (set up by Animal) falling on the increasingly frenetic Beaker, quickly became a viral video that Christmas season.

== Charts ==
=== Pentatonix version ===
Chart (2013–2014)	Peak position
US Holiday 100 (Billboard)	66

=== John Williams version ===
Chart (2017–2026)	Peak position
Australia (ARIA)	34
Austria (Ö3 Austria Top 40)	50
Canada Hot 100 (Billboard)	47
Germany (GfK)	68
Global 200 (Billboard)	45
Greece International (IFPI)	21
Hungary (Single Top 40)	12
Hungary (Stream Top 40)	16
Ireland (IRMA)	29
Italy (FIMI)	54
Latvia Streaming (LaIPA)	17
Lithuania (AGATA)	28
Netherlands (Single Top 100)	45
New Zealand (Recorded Music NZ)	33
Norway (IFPI Norge)	44
Poland (Polish Streaming Top 100)	28
Portugal (AFP)	56
Sweden (Sverigetopplistan)	60
Switzerland (Schweizer Hitparade)	36
UK Singles (Official Charts)	36
US Holiday 100 (Billboard)	47

=== Mantikor version ===
Chart (2021)	Peak position
DE Deutsche Compilationcharts	3

== Certifications ==
=== Pentatonix version ===
Region	Certification	Certified units/sales
Canada (Music Canada)	Gold	40,000^{‡}
^{‡} Sales+streaming figures based on certification alone.

=== John Williams version ===
Region	Certification	Certified units/sales
New Zealand (RMNZ)	Gold	15,000^{‡}
United Kingdom (BPI) Sales since 2007	Platinum	600,000^{‡}
Streaming
Greece (IFPI Greece)	Gold	1,000,000^{†}
^{‡} Sales+streaming figures based on certification alone.^{†} Streaming-only figures based on certification alone.

== See also ==
- List of Christmas carols
