= Dial-A-Carol =

Christmas carol phone line in Illinois

- Genre: Christmas; Chanukah
- Begins: December 12, 2024
- Ends: December 17, 2024
- Frequency: Annually
- Locations: Snyder Hall at the University of Illinois at Urbana-Champaign, 206 E Peabody Dr, Champaign, IL, USA
- Website: housing.illinois.edu/dial-a-carol

Dial-A-Carol is an annual student-run service at the University of Illinois at Urbana–Champaign in which students take calls from people asking for a Christmas carol. It is run out of Snyder Hall, a residence hall in the Ikenberry Commons on campus. Students and staff volunteer to take calls around the clock for a one-week straight, every year during finals week of every Fall semester. In 2023 Dial-A-Carol completed 60 years of singing on-demand holiday cheer. The program has garnered national attention from sources such as ABC News, and Jimmy Kimmel Live. USA Today College wrote that Dial-A-Carol shattered previous records by receiving over 10,000 calls in 2015 for one-week span.

== History ==
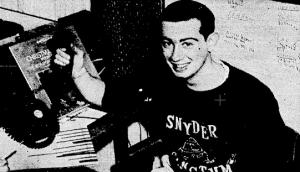
Snyder Sanctum member Steve Price participates in Dial-a-Carol in 1962 (Daily Illini 11 December 1962)

Dial-a-Carol is the longest running tradition in the university's housing department. Betty Gordon, a desk clerk at the time for Snyder Hall on campus, is commonly credited with conceiving of the Dial-a-Carol idea around 1960. She came up with the idea for students on the second floor of Snyder Hall to play holiday records over the phone. By 1962, students were already answering more than 4,000 calls. Soon, student carolers replaced records and now sing for callers from all 50 states and around the world.

2006 was the first year that Dial A Carol was featured on the BBCs Radio One show which resulted in hundreds of calls flooding the phone lines for days. The Scott Mills show have regularly called the service.

== Critical reception ==
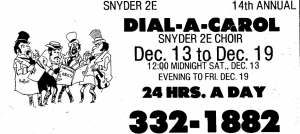
An advertisement for Dial-a-Carol (Daily Illini, 12 December 1975)

In December 2015, Jimmy Kimmel made a spoofed televised segment of Dial-a-Carol with "Hanu-kall-the singing Hanukkah Hotline". This massive attention garnered more callers, which resulted in the all-time highest recorded year in call volume. Many local and international radio stations also featured Dial-a-Carol calls on their programs.
