= Shchedryk (choir) =

Ukrainian professional children's choir

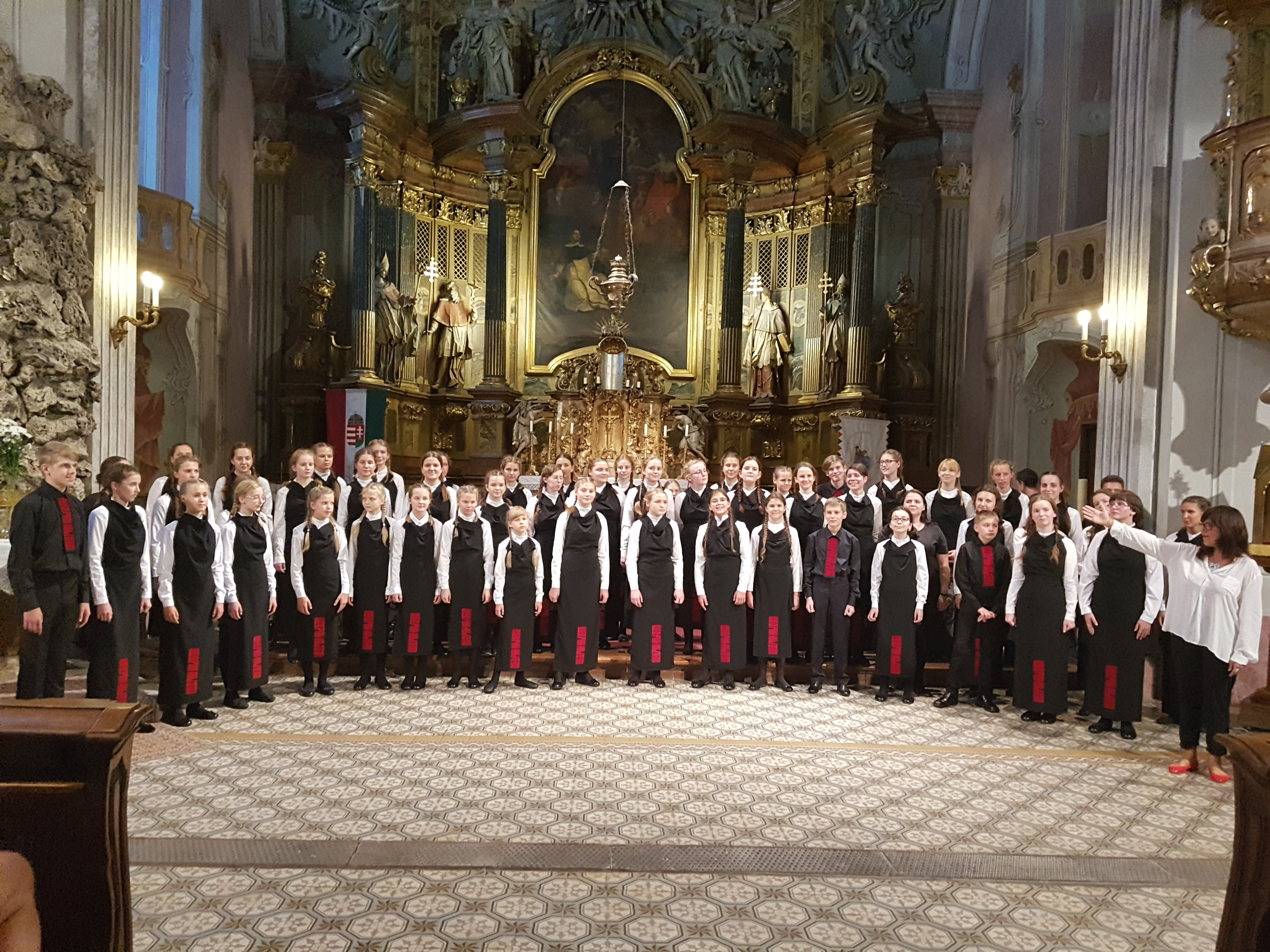
Photo from Budapest, 2018, performance

The Kyiv Children's Choir Shchedryk is a choir founded in 1971 in then-UkrSSR by Iryna Sablina (wife of Roman Kofman). Since 2004, the artistic director and chief conductor of the collective is the Honored Artist of Ukraine Marianna Sablina.

The repertoire of the Shchedryk choir includes Renaissance music, baroque, classical and spiritual music, arrangements of Ukrainian songs and songs of the peoples of the world, works of modern domestic and foreign composers. Shchedryk performs all works in the original language.

Today, the choir has more than 150 children of various ages who are engaged in the respective age groups. About 55 best performers are part of the concert lineup. Over the 50 years of the choir's existence, Shchedryk has trained more than 2,000 choristers. Among the graduates of the choir are the Ukrainian composer Viktoria Poleva and the soloist of the Kyiv House of Organ Music Maria Lipinska.

== Concert activities ==
Shchedryk gave more than 500 concerts in Germany, USA, Canada, Italy, Australia, Latvia, Poland and Ukraine, in particular in concert halls: Carnegie Hall (New York), Musikverein Golden Hall and Konzerthaus Great Hall (Vienna), the Chamber Hall of the Berlin Philharmonic, Mozarteum (Salzburg), Beethovenhalle (Bonn), Roy Thomson Hall (Toronto), Gasteig (Munich), Forum (Leverkusen), Musikaliska and Eric Ericsonhallen (Stockholm), the Great Hall of the Moscow Conservatory named after P. I. Tchaikovsky, and others.

In joint projects, Shchedryk cooperated with Volodymyr Krainev, Gidon Kremer, Roman Kofman, Giya Kancheli, Ivan Monighetti, Daniel Barenboim, Marta Argerich and others.

The first three recordings of the Shchedryk choir were made by the Melodiya company on vinyl records. Part of the Shchedryk repertoire is presented on 5 CDs recorded in Ukraine. The German company Deutsche Welle broadcast the 2011 Shchedryk Christmas concert in Bonn. An honorable place in the choir's discography is occupied by the composition "Three small liturgies" by Olivier Messiaen, performed by Shchedryk together with the Kremerata Baltica orchestra under the direction of Roman Kofman, which was included in the collection of the best concerts in the history of the Gidon Kremer Chamber Music Festival.

== Festivals and competitions ==
The choir participated in prestigious Ukrainian and international music festivals and competitions:

- America Fest in Des Moines (USA), 1992
- Kyiv Music Fest in Kyiv (Ukraine), 2000
- Gidon Kremer chamber music festivals in Lockenhaus (Austria), 2002, 2008, 2011
- III International Choir Festival in Riga (Latvia), 2003
- Tonika in Kyiv (Ukraine), 2004
- 1st International Autumn Choir Festival in Moscow (Russia) to the 140th anniversary of the Moscow Conservatory, 2005
- Virtuosos in Lviv (Ukraine), 2006
- Cantus MM in Salzburg (Austria), 2007
- Cracovia Music Festival in Krakow (Poland), 2009
- Beethovenfest in Bonn (Germany), 2010
- Appointment with Slava - an event in Kronberg (Germany) to honor the memory of M. Rostropovich, 2011
- XX Chamber Music Festival in Kronberg (Germany), 2013
- To Russia With Love - concert in Berlin (Germany) in support of political prisoners, 2013
- Leigo Lake in Leigo (Estonia), 2015
- Rethinking Europe — Stop One: Ukraine - Ukrainian music festival in Stockholm (Sweden), 2017
- VII International Festival of Orchestral and Choral Groups in Florence (Italy), 2018
- XIII Summa Cum Laude International Youth Music Festival in Vienna (Austria), 2019

== Awards and reviews ==
In all international competitions in which Shchedryk participated, they won the highest awards:

- Grand Prix of the International Choir Competition "Kathaumixw" in Powell River (Canada), 1990
- Grand Prix of the International Choir Competition in Des Moines (USA), 1992
- Grand Prix and Gold Diploma of the XXXVI International Choir Competition in Mendziszdroje (Poland), 2001
- Gold diploma of the highest degree and Grand Prix I of the International Competition Musica sacra a Roma in Rome (Italy), 2005
- "Golden David" - Grand Prix of the VII International Festival-Competition of Orchestral and Choir Groups in Florence (Italy), 2018
- First place with distinction "Outstanding success" in the category Treble Choirs / Women's choirs / XIII Summa Cum Laude International Youth Music Festival in Vienna (Austria), 2019

=== Press reviews ===
- "Soviet Sensation" — "Times", 1990
- "World-class professional ensemble" — "Ukrainian Weekly", 1991
- "The musical level reached by such young choristers seems impossible" - "The Hawk Age", 1993
- "Already after the first sounds it became clear why this choir is considered one of the best in the world" —"Bad Godesberger Nachrichter", 1996
- "It's too good to be true" —"Süddeutsche Zeitung", 1998
- "At first, these children cause respect and only after that - tender emotions" — Week, 2007
- "These children's voices are the epitome of crystal singing, tenderness and fearlessness, gentleness and freedom. When you hear Shchedryk sing, you see the world with new eyes." — «Day», 2014

=== Famous quotes about Shchedryk ===
- Giya Kancheli, composer:

«Children's choirs exist in many countries, but Shchedryk is a special phenomenon because it is based on the unique choral traditions established by Iryna Sablina and successfully continued by her daughter Marianna Sablina. Thanks to them, Shchedryk became a unique phenomenon».

- Gidon Kremer, violinist, conductor:

«I would like to testify that "Shchedryk" is an outstanding ensemble that always enjoys incredible success with the public and connoisseurs. This is a choral ensemble capable of "speaking" on a global scale with angelic children's voices about their country and testifying to the historical musical traditions of their people».

- Boris Tevlin, choirmaster, professor of the Moscow Conservatory named after P. I. Tchaikovsky:

«The victory of the Kyiv children's choir "Shchedryk" in Rome was an absolute victory of Ukrainian choral art in the world».

- Svyatoslav Vakarchuk, soloist of "Ocean Elzy":

«We must bow to these young children who carry our music, our culture abroad. They do it qualitatively, beautifully and sincerely. Shchedryk is the pride of Ukraine».

- Pope Benedict XVI:

«Thank you, Shchedryk, for being flawless in your singing!»

== Links ==
- Official website
