= Shchedrivka =

Ukrainian New Year's song

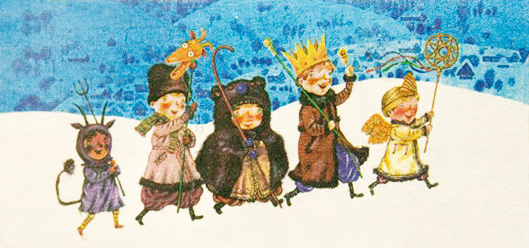
Shchedrivka singers on a 2001 stamp of Ukraine

Shchedrivka (Ukrainian: щедрівка; plural щедрівки, shchedrivky) is a genre of traditional Ukrainian ritual song performed on New Year's Eve (Щедрий вечір, lit. 'Bounteous Evening'). It is customary that shchedrivky, similarly to koliadky (Christmas songs), glorify the host and his family during caroling.

== Name ==
The word "shchedrivka" is of Slavic origin and originates from the ritualistic dinner called kutia, which is prepared after fasting. New Year's kutia is described as shchedra (bounteous), in contrast to Christmas kutia (pisna, lean and bidna, poor). Fasting was practiced prior to the Christianization of the region, and so was caroling. While the date of koliaduvannia shifted from winter solstice to Christmas, shchedruvannia remained a largely secular practice performed on New Year's Eve.

== Difference from similar genres ==
Shchedrivky, which are performed on New Year's Eve, are to be distinguished from koliadky, which are performed on Christmas (24–25 December), and zasivalky, performed on New Year's Day. In certain region, shchedrivky are also sung on the eve of Epiphany.

Koliadky primarily celebrate the birth of Jesus Christ, while shchedrivky wish the family well-being, a rich harvest, etc. Zasivalky are similar in content with shchedrivky but are performed on January 1 (St Basil's Day). This is reflected in the text: while shchedrivky are characterized by the constant repetition of the phrases "shchedryi vechir" (lit. 'bounteous evening') and "dobryi vechir" (lit. 'good evening'), zasivalky often repeat "siiu-viiu, zasivaiu" (lit. 'I sow, I sow') and similar words because, on the morning of New Year, boys traditionally "sow" houses of neighbours and relatives with grain while singing ritual songs. In addition, some zasivalky mention Saint Basil.

Also, traditionally, koliadky are performed by boys and men, while shchedrivky are sung by girls and women.

== Content and history ==
Ancient shchedrivky preserve stories from the life of knyazs and druzhynas of Kievan Rus'. Before the 15th century, New Year was celebrated with the coming of spring in March, so shchedrivky were essentially the same as vesnianky (hence the common mention of birds such as swallows, cuckoos, and serins also known as shchedryks). With the arrival of Christianity, parts of the church sought to eradicate the pagan songs, while others incorporated them into Christian beliefs.

Many Ukrainian writers and composers were inspired by shchedrivky, including Mykola Lysenko, Mykola Leontovych (in particular in his song Shchedryk), Kyrylo Stetsenko, Mykhailo Verykivsky, and Kostiantyn Dankevych.

== See also ==
- Koliadka
- Vesnianky

== Sources ==
- Potebnia, A. Объяснения малороссийских и сродных песен [Explanation of Little Russian and related songs]. — V. 1, 1883. — V. 2, 1887.
- Hnatiuk, V. Колядки і щедрівки: Етнографічний збірник [Koliadky and shchedrivky: Ethnographical collection]. — V. 35—36. — 1914.
- Dei O. Українські колядки і щедрівки в дослідженнях слов'янських вчених // Pages from the history of Ukrainian folcloristics. — Kyiv. 1975.
- Odarchenko, P. Щедрівки [Shchedrivky] // Encyclopedia of Ukrainian Studies. ed. Kubiiovych, Volodymyr — Paris — New-York : Molode Zhyttia, 1955–1995. — ISBN 978-5-7707-4049-3
- Filtz, B. Джерела музичної культури України [Sources of musical culture of Ukraine] // Dzvin. — 1990.
- Rudnytsky, A. Українська музика. Історико-критичний огляд [Ukrainian music: Historical and critical review]. — Munich: Dniprova Khvylia, 1963.
- Olkhovskyi, A. Нарис історії української музики [Outline of the history of Ukrainian music] / ed. Kornii, L. — Kyiv: Muz. Ukraina, 2003. Музика Західної України (Галичина та Закарпатська Україна) [Music of Western Ukraine (Galicia and Transcarpathian Ukraine].
