= Summa Cum Laude Festival =

Music festival in Vienna, Austria

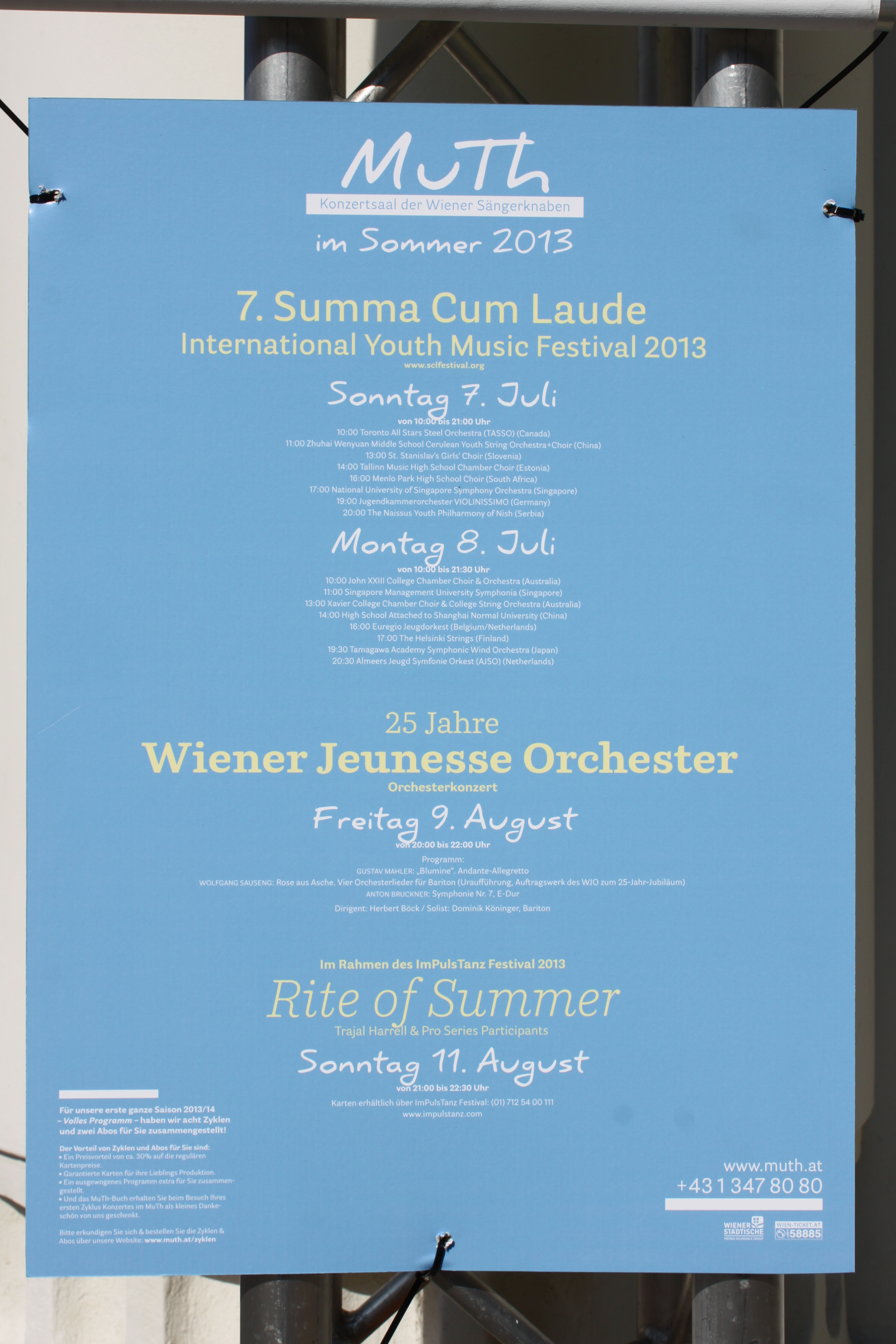
Summa Cum Laude Festival in 2013, MuTh

The Summa Cum Laude Festival is an international youth music festival for choirs, bands and orchestras, held annually in Vienna, Austria during July. It takes place in the city's two main classical concert venues, the Golden Hall of the Musikverein and the Konzerthaus. The Festival was established in 2007, hosted by VIA MUSICA (Vienna International Association for Music and Culture Exchange). The following year in 2008, the Summa Cum Laude Festival expanded to include both the Summa Cum Laude Competition as well as the Summa Cum Laude Celebration. Performing groups may elect to compete with their peers in the "SCL Competition" or they may opt to participate in the non-competitive "SCL Celebration."

== Festival venues ==
The opening ceremony is held in St. Stephen's Cathedral, Vienna. Workshops and seminars take place in the University of Music and Performing Arts, Vienna. The competition itself and the Celebration are held in the Golden Hall of the Musikverein and/or in the Great Hall of the Konzerthaus. The closing ceremony is held in the Hofburg Palace in Vienna.

Venues for additional concerts in and around Vienna include:

- The new Vienna Boys' Choir's concert hall MuTh, opened in December 2012 and located at Vienna's Augarten
- The Haus der Musik (House of Music), an interactive discovery museum located in the former Palace of Archduke Charles
- The Jewish Museum of Vienna
- The Bad Tatzmannsdorf Parish Church and Community Hall situated in the province of Burgenland
- The festival in Großschönau, a village in the district of Gmünd in the Austrian state of Lower Austria
