= Ukrainian Republic Capella =

Ukrainian former music company

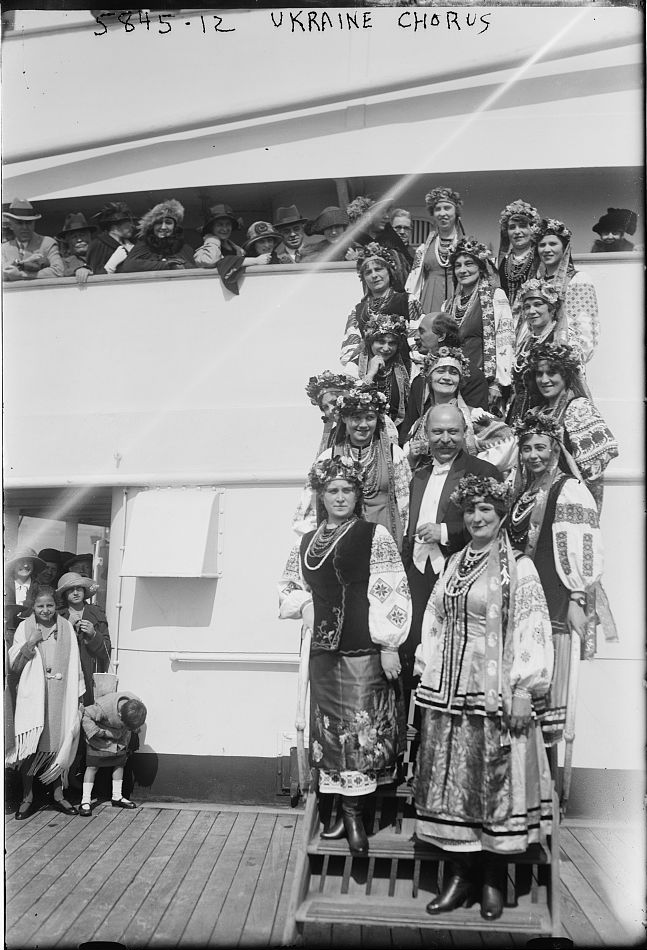
The Ukrainian National Chorus, successor to the Ukrainian Republic Capella, c. 1922-1925

The Ukrainian Republic Capella (Ukrainian: Українська республіканська капела; later known as the Ukrainian National Chorus) was a musical company during and after World War I which toured Europe and North America with the intent to promote Ukrainian culture abroad. The main sponsor of the Capella was Symon Petliura.

== Background ==
Alexander Koshetz conducting the Ukrainian National Chorus in a performance of the Ukrainian national anthem in 1917.

During World War I, many events shook Eastern Europe. In Ukraine, a new chance to create an independent state presented itself. One of the key figures in this period was Symon Petliura. Petliura thought that many people may want to contribute to the promotion of Ukrainian culture, and realized that not everybody would be a good soldier. In order to include the greatest number of people into the process of statehood, Petliura organized a series of cultural programs, funded by the central Directorate of Ukraine, to actively promote Ukrainian culture abroad. One such initiative was the Ukrainian Republic Capella.

== Beginning ==
In January 1919, Petliura held a meeting with Oleksandr Koshetz and Kyrylo Stetsenko and presented the idea. Soon after this meeting, Oleksa Prykhodko also joined the Capella as assistant director.

The situation of the Capella was difficult in that the political situation in Kyiv was unstable. Although Koshetz and Stetsenko began work almost immediately, on January 26, 1919, Koshetz was forced to leave Kyiv before it was overrun by the Bolsheviks.

The Capella eventually reunited in Kamianets-Podilskyi, where the final preparations were made.

== First European Tour ==
The first tour of the Ukrainian Republic Capella started on April 26, 1919, in Czechoslovakia. The first concert was performed on May 20, 1919.

The tour continued from Czechoslovakia to Switzerland, France, Belgium, the Netherlands, and England.

== Second European Tour ==
Even though the Capella as a choir was receiving triumphant reviews, personality conflicts between Koshetz and Prykhodko led to a split. In the fall of 1920, Prykhodko and 20 members of the Capella returned to Czechoslovakia. However, Koshetz received further funding from Petliura, and Koshetz recruited Ukrainians living in Poland to the Capella.

The new Capella toured France, Spain, and Belgium.

== Dissolution ==
In May 1921, Oleksandr Koshetz announced the dissolution of the Ukrainian Republic Capella.

Later that year, Koshetz and some other members of the Capella created the Ukrainian National Chorus.

== Legacy ==
The Ukrainian National Chorus, which toured the United States and Canada between 1922 and 1926 is credited with introducing the Ukrainian Christmas Carol "Shchedryk" - known as the "Carol of the Bells" in English.
