= Malanka =

Folk holiday

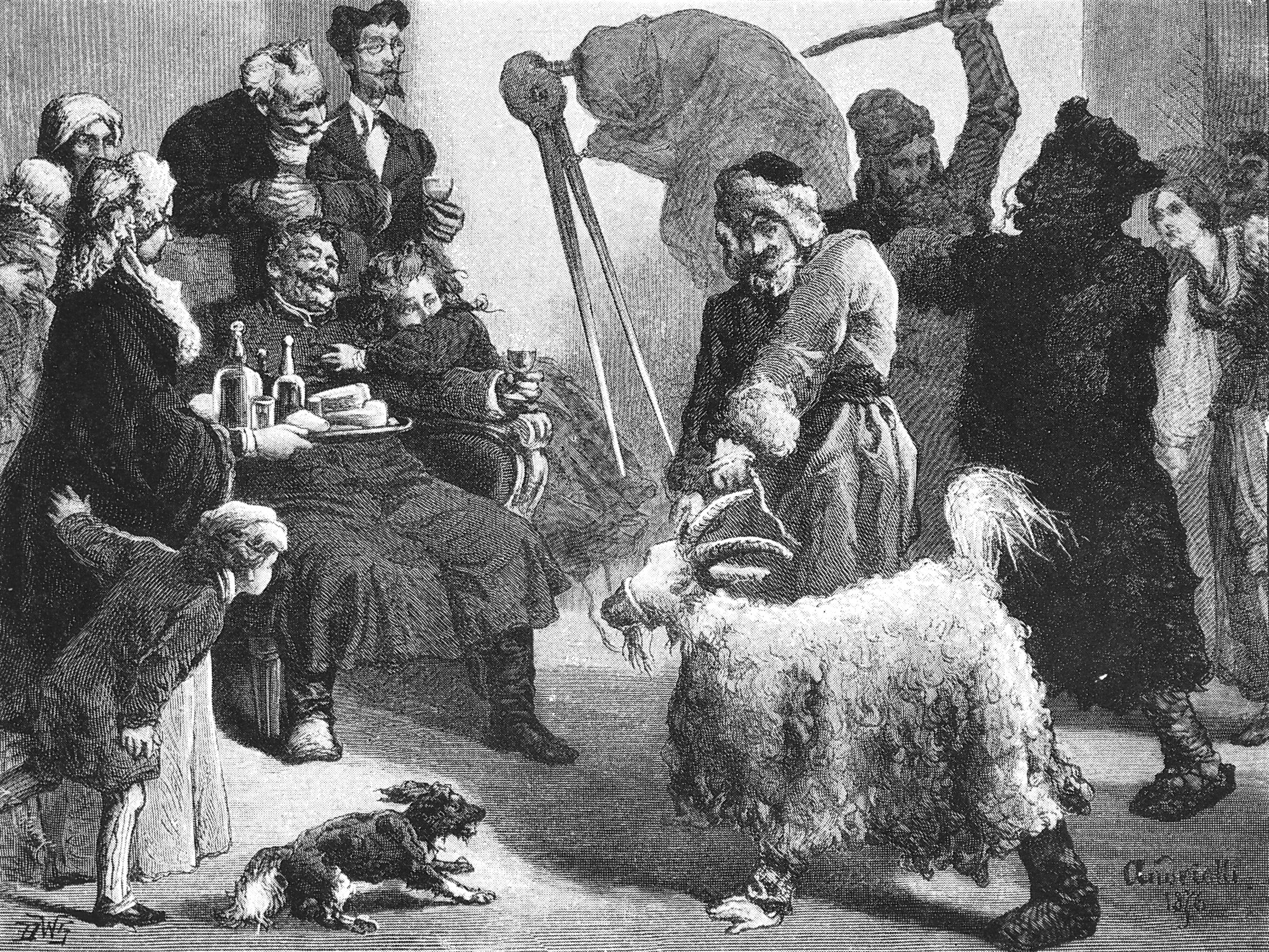
- Goat guiding
- Date: 31 December
- Frequency: annual

Malanka (Ukrainian: Маланка, or Щедрий вечір, Shchedryi Vechir, literally "bounteous evening") is a Ukrainian folk holiday celebrated on 31 December, which is New Year's Eve in accordance with the Gregorian calendar. Formerly it was celebrated on 13 January corresponding to 31 December in the Julian calendar (see Old New Year). The festivities were historically centred around house-to-house visiting by groups of young men, costumed as characters from a folk tale of pre-Christian origin, as well as special food and drink. The context of the rituals has changed, but some elements continue to the present.

== Origins and history ==
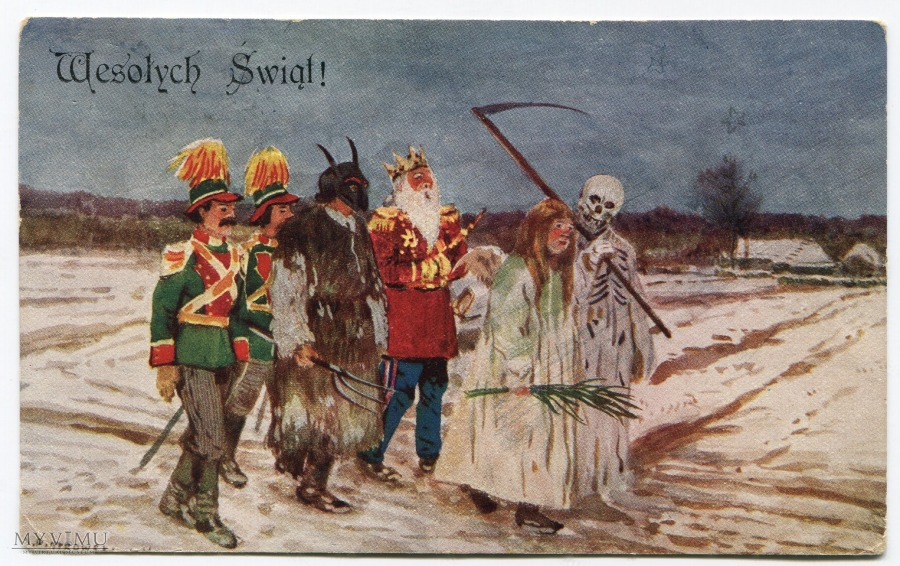
A procession on a Polish Christmas Card from 1929 showing some of the typical stock characters such as the gendarmes, the young girl, etc.

The idea of house-to-house visits during the Christmas season is a pan-European one. Similar customs are observed in Ireland and England as "mummering", in Winterbräuche or Faslam in Germany, etc. In the West Slavic lands, even more closely related customs are found, with Poles even using many of the same stock characters in their house-visiting traditions.

The ritual is derived from an unspecified pagan origin.

Descriptions of this holiday from the nineteenth century mention the folk play with a character named "Malanka". They also frequently mention the tradition of driving a goat from house to house to bring good luck. In some regions of Western Ukraine and in Romania, a live goat is replaced by a dancer in a goat costume.

During the Soviet period, Malanka celebrations were unofficially banned as part of the anti-religious campaign; people participating in the ritual were persecuted and arrested. Nevertheless, the tradition survived and remains popular in many towns and villages of modern-day Ukraine.

== Name ==
This holiday is also known as Bounteous Evening in much of Ukraine and Belarus, but this name can also be applied to Epiphany Eve (or Theophany Eve) in Western Ukraine. A traditional way of referring to the holidays during the Christmas season in the Eastern Slavic languages is by which recipe of kutia (whole-grain sweetened porridge), the most symbolic ritual food, is used. A lenten (dairy-free) version (bahata kutia, 'ample kutia') is associated with Christmas Eve, schedra kutia ('generous' or 'bountiful' kutia) with the Old New Year's Eve or Malanka, hence "bounteous evening", and a second lenten version ("hungry kutia") for Theophany Eve).

== Ukrainian traditions ==
=== Geography of celebrations ===
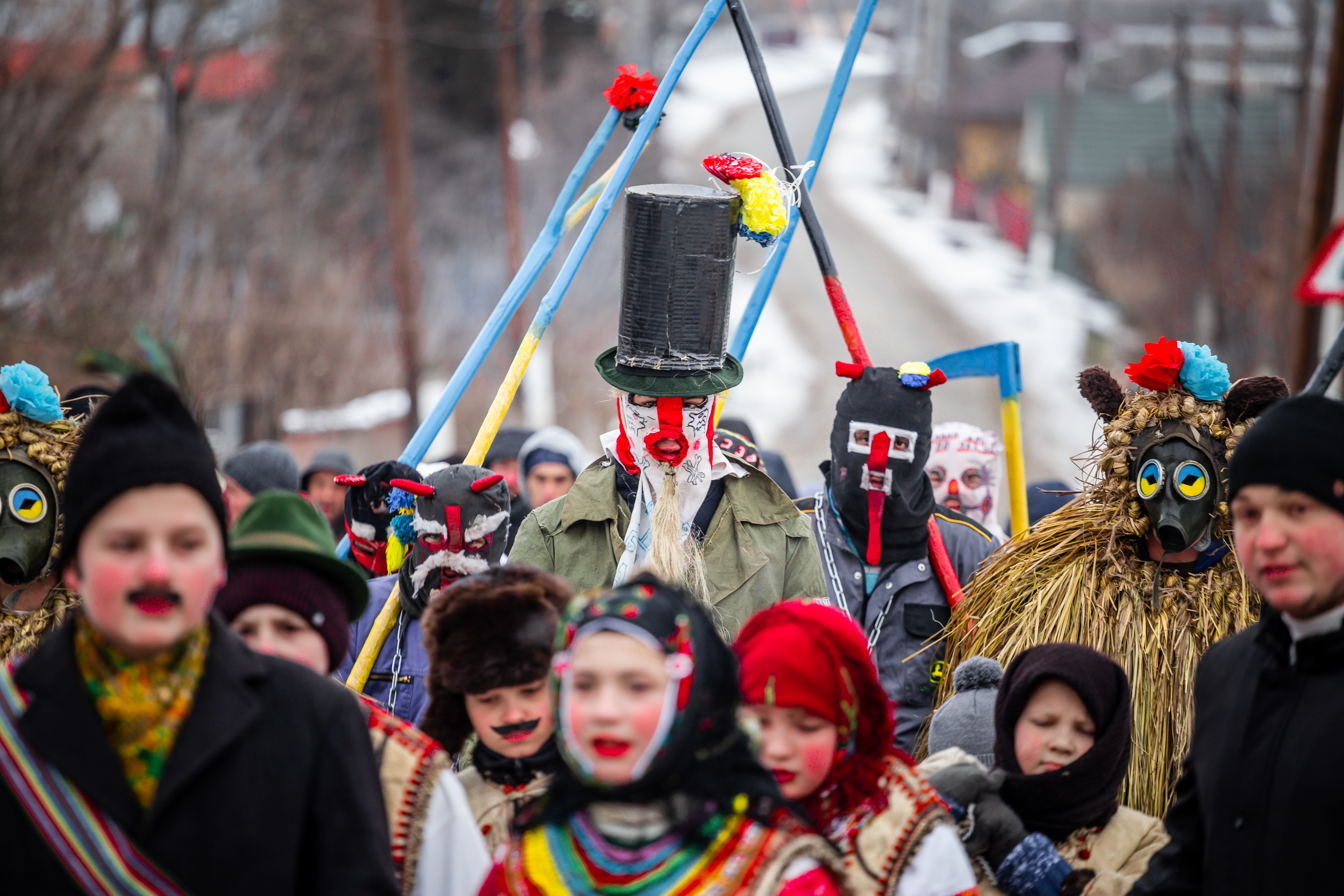
Participants of a modern Malanka celebration in Beleluia

Historically the most lavish Malanka celebrations would take place in the lands of Hutsulshchyna, Bukovyna, Pokuttia and Dnieper Ukraine. In our days the tradition of celebrating Malanka has been best preserved in the southwestern Ukrainian regions of Bukovyna and Pokuttia, as well as in southern Podolia. Malanka celebrations are also common among ethnic Romanians and Moldovans living in the area. In localities such as Vashkivtsi and Krasnoilsk Malanka processions attract numerous tourists every year. Traditional celebrations of this holiday in Beleluia, Horoshova and Nyzhnii Bereziv are also famous. In Chernivtsi the annual Malanka parade is held every January.

=== Food ===
Traditional foods other than kutia eaten during Malanka involved sausages, meat and varenyky. Other foods popular on this day are kholodets, ham, holubtsi, bigos, chicken or turkey, pancakes etc. In Southern Ukraine bublyky would be baked for this day and given to carolling as a kind of "payment". In Podolia and western Black Sea region lots of bread products would be baked for Malanka, including kalach, palianytsia, knysh, pies and pyrizhky and pampushky. In southern regions two loaves of bread symbolizing Malanka and Vasyl would be put on the festive table together with hemp seed, a coin and a wreath of garlic. In the outskirts of Vinnytsia the head of a family would hide himself behind the loaves of bread and ask his children if they could see him, wishing that it would also be possible in the following year. A popular drink in Southern Ukraine on this day was milk kysil with fruit.

In some villages of Vinnytsia Oblast on this day people prepare a traditional festive dish of blood sausage, which is also called "malanka". They also bake special breads which are called "Malanka" and "Vasyl".

On the morning of Malanka the second ritual kutia is prepared – the "generous" kutia. Unlike the "bahata" kutia on Sviat Vechir (Christmas Eve), it is made with non-Lenten ingredients. As is done on Sviat Vechir, the kutia is placed in the pokuttia – the corner of the house where religious icons are displayed, opposite the pich (stove). In addition, the women bake mlyntsi (pancakes), and make pyrihs and dumplings with cheese, to give as gifts to the carolers and "sowers".

Food is given a very important role: on Malanka, as it is believed that the more variety on the table that day, the more generous next year will be. The dishes should be very satisfying, but, for example, cooking fish is a bad sign, because happiness can "pour" out of the home. Pork dishes are definitely prepared, as this animal symbolizes abundance in the house. Traditionally, pork is prepared as kholodets (meat in aspic), kishka (blood sausage) and pork sausage, vershchaky (roasted pork marinated in beet kvas), salo (cured slabs of pork fatback), stuffed whole pig, and more.

=== Rituals ===
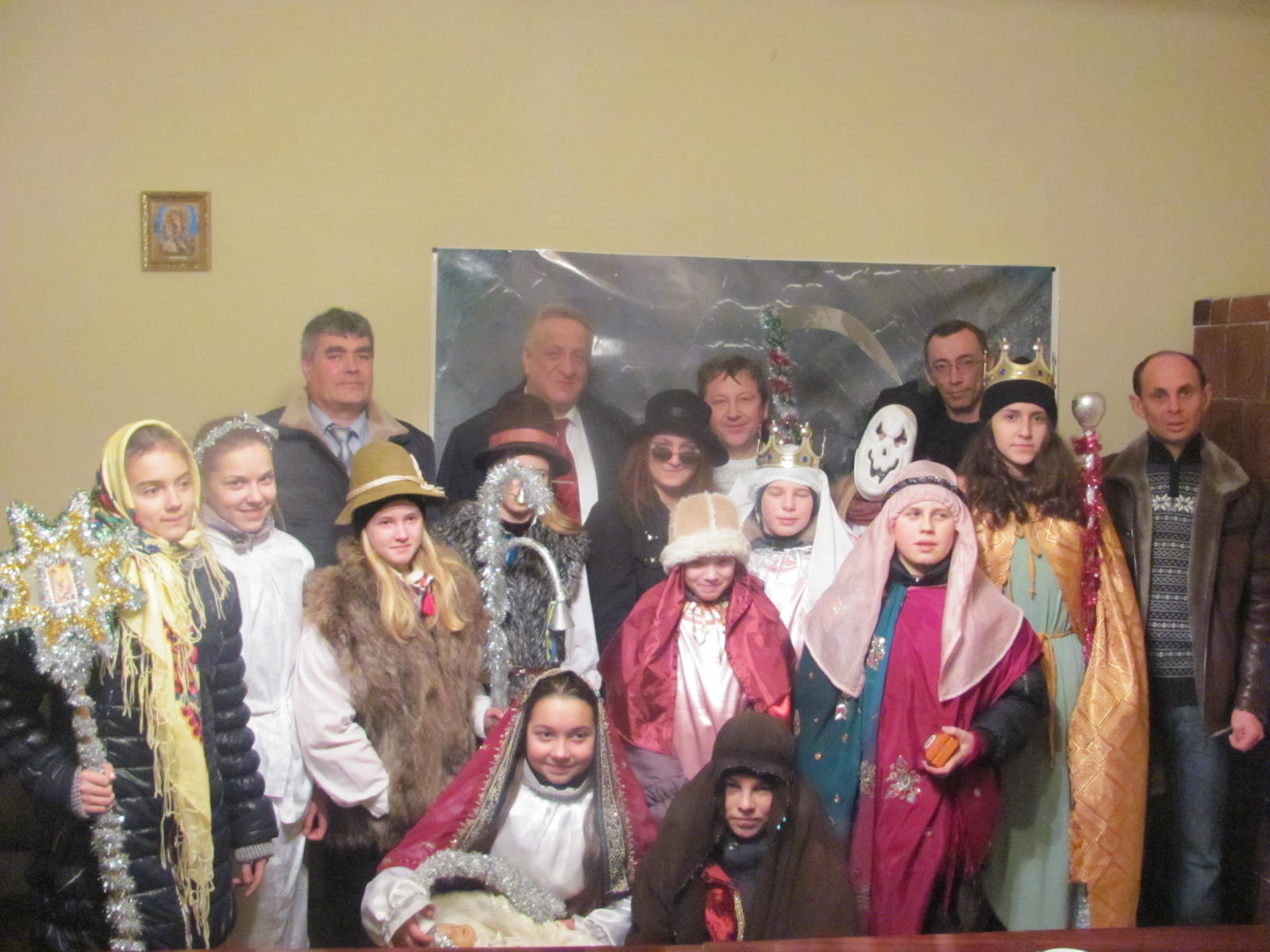
Children participating in a Malanka play (vertep) in Lviv Oblast

According to a tradition, members of the Malanka procession sing songs in front of each house in the village before going inside and presenting a humorous play. In Bukovyna only men take part in Malanka processions; in some places exclusively unmarried males are allowed to participate. In many cases the participants are followed by musicians using various instruments, from drums to trumpets. Members of the procession wish good luck to everyone thay meet on their way, but may also engage in tricks and even symbolic "theft".

Among unmarried girls Malanka was traditionally known as a time of fortunetelling: on New Years' Eve they would attempt to predict their success in marriage by performing divination. Farmers would also perform rituals on this day, attempting to predict rain and drought, which could influence the future harvest. Garden trees which had failed to bring a fruitful harvest would be "threatened" to be cut down by the host carrying an axe, with the hostess preventing this by pleading her husband for "mercy" and bandaging the trunk with straw. In Western Ukraine the hostess would leave a glass of water for the night and measure its quantity on the first morning of the new year to predict the length of her lifespan.

The next day, (St. Basil's Day), the young men go to "sow grain" in the morning after sunrise. The grain is carried in a glove or bag. First they visit their godparents and other relatives and loved ones, then their neighbors. Entering the house, the sower sows grain and greets everyone with the New Year:

I sow, I sow, I sow, I greet you with the New Year!
Good fortune, and good health in the New Year,
May your fields bear better this year than last,
Rye, wheat and any grains,
Hemp piled to the ceiling in large rolls.
Be healthy for the New Year and Basil's Day!
God grant us this!

The first sower to visit on New Year's day brings happiness to the house. A person performing this action would receive money or sweets as a sign of gratitude. According to popular belief, girls do not bring happiness, only boys do, and therefore it is not appropriate for girls to go "sowing".

On New Year's Day the inner half of the house would be cleaned, waste thrown away into the fields. In southern parts of Ukraine pig bones left from the festive dinner would be buried on a land plot to provide the soil fertility. In western regions on New Year's Day the host of the household would take a piece of bread, wash it with water from his well and roll it across the house to the table, wishing for the year to go as smoothly as the loaf. Afterwards the family members would wash themselves in a bowl of water, into which coins would be thrown, or in a nearby stream. In some localities, for example in Podolia, a male household animal, such as a horse or a ram adorned with bands, ears of rain, flowers and berries, would be led into the house to provide good luck for the host. In the Middle Dnieper region an ox would be used for this purpose, followed by a ram, pig, horse or even birds. Presence of animal excrement in the house was seen in this case as a sign of special luck.

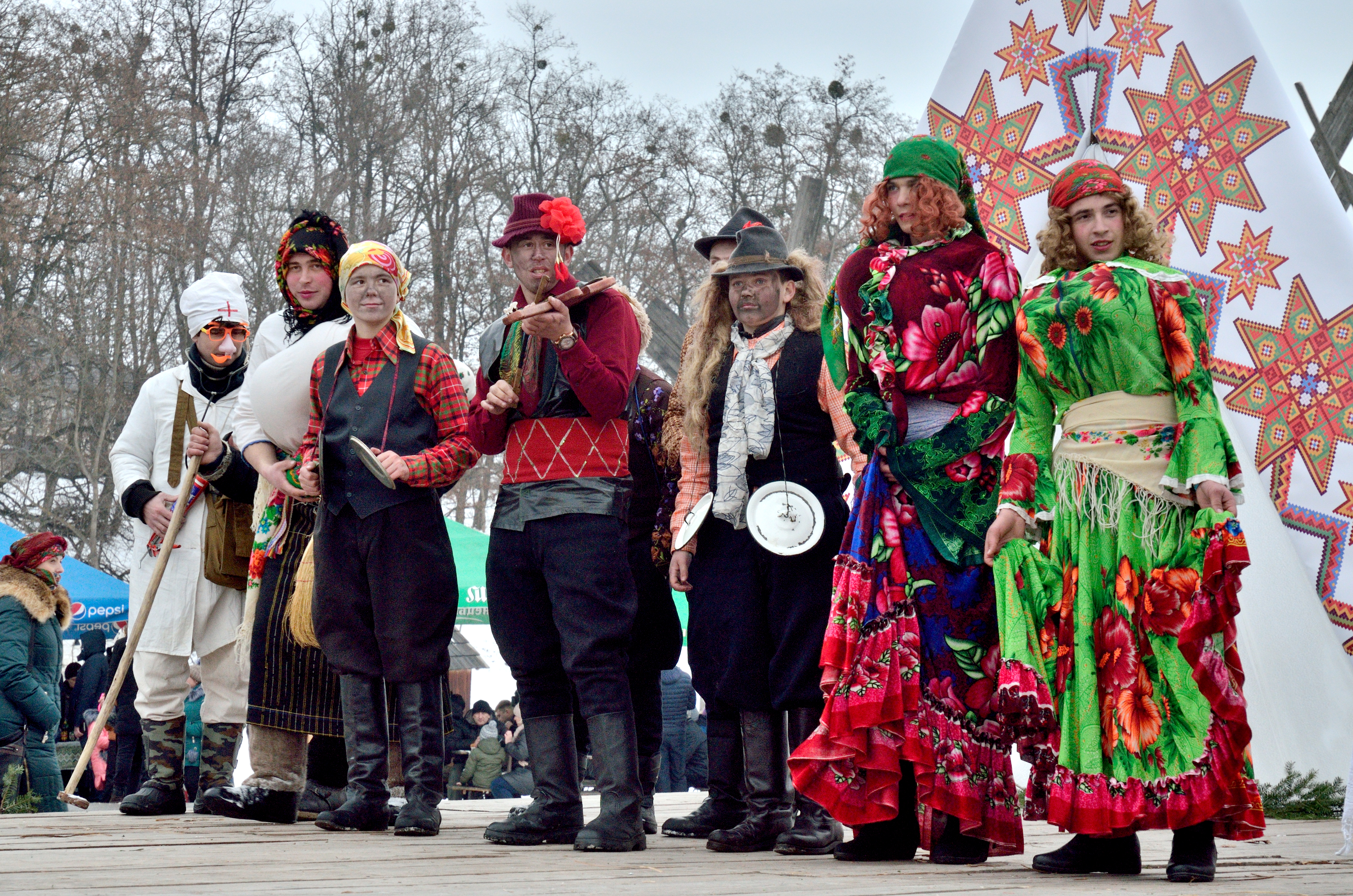
Young men in Chernivtsi wearing traditional costumes of Malanka characters: the Devil, the Old Man (Did) and Old Woman (Baba), the Jew and others

According to custom, after finishing their ritual rounds, the young men went to a crossroads to burn the "Did" or "Didukh" – a sheaf of grain that had stood in the pokuttia since Sviat Vechir – and then jumped over a bonfire. This was meant to cleanse them after dealing with the evil spirits all night. In many villages several groups would take part in competitions between each other, followed by common meals involving both the winning and losing sides. Malanka celebrations would also involve dancing, in which anyone could participate.

=== Costumes ===
Before the holiday costumes and masks depicting different heroes are prepared. Most popular characters played by the participants of Malanka celebrations are the Goat, the Devil, the Death, the Old Man and the Old Woman, the Gypsy and the Jew. In earlier times clay masks would be used, but today they have been replaced by industrially produced items. Modern Malanka celebrations may also involve people dressing as heroes of popular culture and famous politicians. The figure of Malanka herself is traditionally played by a young man dressed in a female folk dress. The main heroine is always followed by her companion, Vasyl. In some parts of the Carpathians the figure of the Bear could also be a central part of the celebrations.

== Malanka celebrations in North America ==
=== Among early settlers ===
Canadian folklorist Robert Klymasz identifies the Ukrainian tradition of Malanka as alike to the mummering practiced in Britain, Ireland and Newfoundland, but with several differences. For one thing, Ukrainian Malanka mummers were typically unmarried and always male, never female; they made a point of visiting houses that had unmarried young women, so the ritual had a function in courtship. The humour of the ritual came from the fact that the lankiest, most awkward young man was chosen to play the role of Malanka, and then all the song praised Malanka's supposed beauty and grace. The eligible woman of the house was scrutinized to see to which of the mummers she gave any gifts of money or food and drink as evidence of who she might like to marry. According to Klymasz, these house-visits were largely lost after the Second World War, and replaced by a modernized ritual.

=== Modernized celebrations ===
In North America, house visits were largely replaced by Ukrainized versions of an Anglo-North American New Year's Eve ball after the Second World War. They typically occur a week after Christmas Eve (Old Calendar), but not necessarily falling on 13 or 14 January; they are usually held on an ensuing Friday or Saturday night. The characters from the mummery are now presented instead as a skit for an audience.

These "Malanky" are mostly pure modernized recreation, but with enough distinctions to indicate their cultural background. The event would typically include a supper, raffles and door prizes, and end with a zabava (dance). At midnight, once everyone cheers for the New Year, individual and pair polka dancing is stopped and the kolomyika begins. When the kolomyjka is finished, everyone resumes to their previous dancing and continue to party the night away. Malanka is often the last opportunity for partying before the solemn period of Lent which precedes Easter.

== In modern popular culture ==
Malanka celebrations are mentioned in the Ukrainian film Pamfir, which took part in the 2022 Cannes Film Festival.

== See also ==
- Shchedrivka
- Shchedryk
