= Peter Wilhousky =

American composer, music educator, and choral conductor (1902–1978)

Peter Joseph Wilhousky
- Born: 13 July 1902; Passaic, New Jersey, U.S.
- Died: 4 January 1978 (aged 75); Norwalk, Connecticut, U.S.
- Occupations: Director of music in New York City schools and conductor of the New York All-City High School Chorus
- Known for: English language setting of "Carol of the Bells"; arrangement of "Battle Hymn of the Republic"

Peter Joseph Wilhousky (Note: Rusyn: Петер Йосиф Вільговськый, romanized: Peter Josyf Viľhovs'kŷj) (13 July 1902 – 4 January 1978) was an American composer, music educator, and choral conductor of Rusyn descent. During his childhood he was part of the New York Russian Cathedral Boys Choir and gave a performance at the White House to President Woodrow Wilson. He was featured on several broadcasts of classical music with Arturo Toscanini and the NBC Symphony Orchestra, including the historic 1947 broadcast of Verdi's opera Otello.

In 1936, Wilhousky wrote a popular English version of the Ukrainian song "Shchedryk" by Mykola Leontovych and called it "Carol of the Bells". It has been performed and recorded by a wide variety of singers in different genres.

Wilhousky's 1944 choral arrangement of the "Battle Hymn of the Republic" reached #13 on the Billboard Hot 100 in 1959 with the Mormon Tabernacle Choir's Grammy-winning performance. It has become "arguably the most well-known choral arrangement of a hymn or anthem in the United States."

== Former students ==
As a choral director in New York City, he influenced the future careers of musician Julius La Rosa and scientist Stephen Jay Gould.

== Personal life ==
Wilhousky died on January 4, 1978, at the age of 75, from cancer at Norwalk Hospital. Wilhousky Street in Manville, New Jersey, is named after him.
