= Christmas in Ukraine =

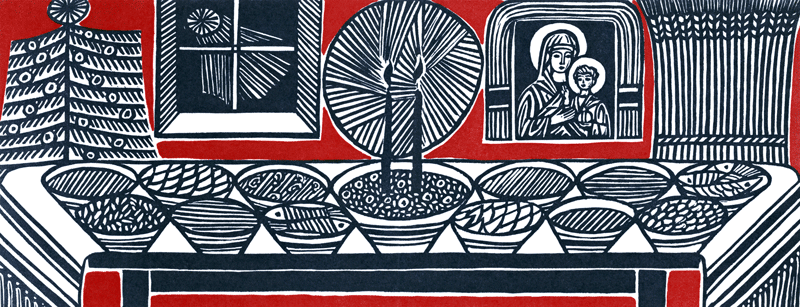
- Twelve-dish Christmas Eve supper by Jacques Hnizdovsky
- Also called: Ukrainian: Різдво, Rizdvo
- Observed by: Christians, many non-Christians
- Type: Christian, cultural
- Significance: Commemoration of the nativity of Jesus
- Celebrations: Gift-giving, family and other social gatherings, symbolic decoration, feasting, etc.
- Observances: Church services
- Date: 25 December: the Orthodox Church of Ukraine, the Latin Church, the Ukrainian Greek Catholic Church, Protestant churches, the Stauropegion of the Ecumenical Patriarchate in Kyiv and the Romanian parishes of the Ukrainian Orthodox Church of the Moscow Patriarchate; 6 January: the Armenian Diocese and Armenian Catholic Church; January 7 [O.S. December 25]: Ukrainian Orthodox Church of the Moscow Patriarchate and some parishes of the Orthodox Church of Ukraine
- Frequency: Annual
- Related to: Nativity Fast

In Ukraine, celebrations of Christmas (Ukrainian: Різдво, romanized: Rizdvo) traditionally start on Christmas Eve, (which is now 24 December) and last until 6 January, the date of the celebration of the baptism of Jesus, known in Ukraine as Vodokhreshche or Yordan, according to the Gregorian calendar and Revised Julian calendar by the Orthodox Church of Ukraine (OCU), the Catholic Church in Ukraine (including the Latin and Greek Catholics) and Ukrainian Protestants.

The Ukrainian Orthodox Church of the Moscow Patriarchate (except for the Romanian parishes) and some parishes of the OCU celebrate Christmas according to the Julian calendar, so the Gregorian holidays last from 6 January to 19 January.

Christmas was largely erased from the Ukrainian calendar for much of the 20th century due to the Soviet Union's anti-religious policies, but many of its traditions survived and are being revived again. In 2023, for the first time since 1917, Christmas Day in Ukraine was officially on 25 December.

== History ==
In Ukraine, the Christmas holiday became the official celebration with the baptism of Rus' ordered by Prince Vladimir in 988. However, given the early Christian community of Kievan Rus', the celebration may have a longer history.

During the mid-19th century celebrations of Christmas Eve in Ukraine included a traditional supper consisting of dishes such as kutia, uzvar, knyshes, pyrizhky (with poppy seed, potato and other fillings), as well as three fish dishes (borshch, tovchenyky and fried fish). The end of Nativity Fast was associated with dishes like cabbage soup and noodles with meat.

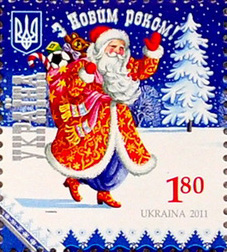
Did Moroz on a Ukrainian postage stamp with New Year greeting

In the 19th century, a lavishly decorated Christmas tree became central to the holiday, a tradition originally imported by Nicholas I's wife, Alexandra Feodorovna, from her native Prussia. The tradition of giving gifts to children on Christmas took root around the same time. Christmas gifts were traditionally brought by Did Moroz or Grandfather Frost, the Ukrainian counterpart of Saint Nicholas or Father Christmas, albeit a little taller and less stout. Rooted in Slavic folklore, Ded Moroz is accompanied by his beautiful granddaughter, Snegurka, the snowmaiden), who rides with him on a sleigh pulled by a trio of horses.

During the early Soviet period, all religious celebrations were discouraged under the official state policy of atheism. The Bolsheviks argued that Christmas was a pagan sun-worshipping ritual with no basis in scientific fact and denounced the Christmas tree as a bourgeois German import. In 1929, all religious holidays, including Christmas, were abolished by a decree of the Stalinist regime. However, in a surprising turn of state politics in 1935, many Ukrainian Christmas traditions were revived as part of a secular New Year's celebration restored in the Soviet Union. The Christmas tree was repurposed as a "New Year's fir tree" to be admired by all children throughout the Soviet Union, including those in republics that had not historically celebrated Christmas due to their different religious traditions, such as the Central Asian ones. Other Ukrainian Christmas attributes and traditions, such as gift-giving, Did Moroz's visits and Christmas decorations, lost their religious significance and became associated with New Year's celebrations, which were secular in nature.

In 1991, after the dissolution of the Soviet Union, Christmas was reinstated alongside other religious holidays. Especially in recent years, there has been a shift from Did Moroz, who came to be associated with the Soviet-era heritage, to the more traditional Saint Nicholas, who used to be more popular in Western Ukraine.

Ukraine declared 25 December as a public holiday in 2017 for the Christmas commemorations and festivities in the local Protestant and Catholic churches. From 2017 to 2022 Ukrainians had two different public holidays commemorating Christmas, 7 January (the date of the holiday according to the Julian calendar) and 25 December (the date of the holiday according to the Gregorian and Revised Julian calendars). Since 2023 Christmas is only officially celebrated in Ukraine on 25 December. This was done as a part of an official campaign to remove Russian influence in Ukraine.

== Date of celebration ==
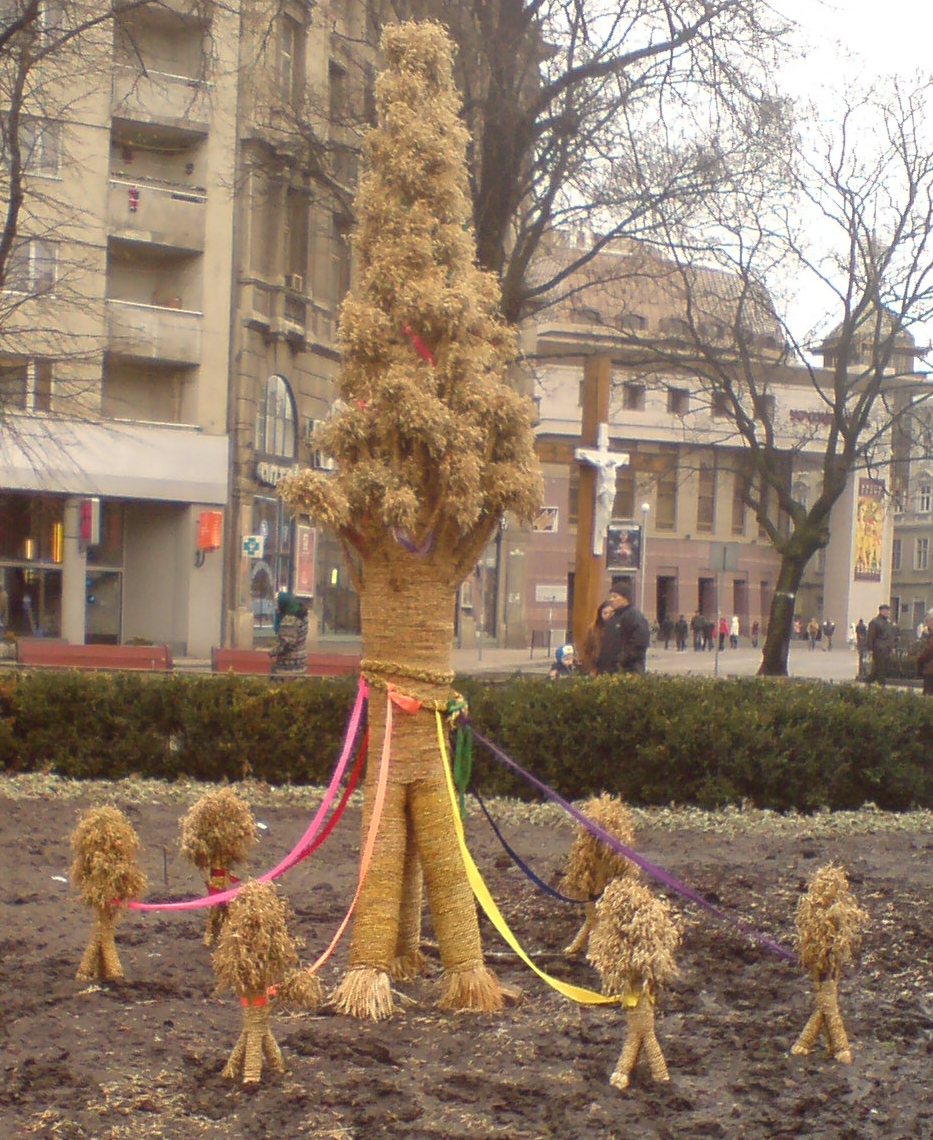
A didukh in Lviv

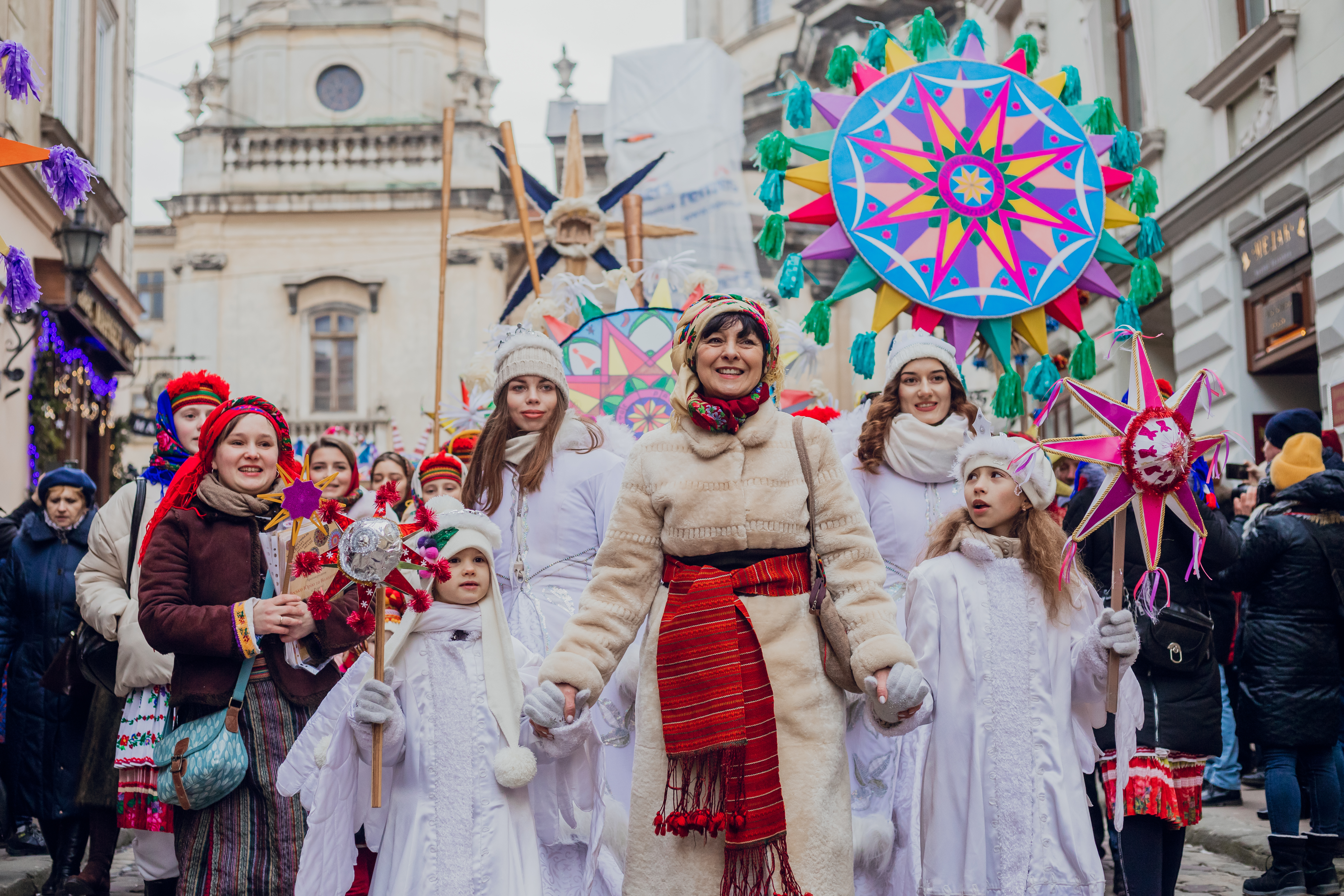
A Christmas parade in Lviv in January 2022, when the old Julian calendar was followed

Traditional Ukrainian Christmas festivities last from 24 December to 6 January, the date of the celebration of the baptism of Jesus, which known in Ukraine as Vodokhreshche or Yordan, according to the Orthodox Church of Ukraine (OCU), the Catholic Church (including Latin and Ukrainian Greek Catholics), and most Protestants.

As of 2017, 25 December, Christmas Day by the Gregorian calendar, became an official government holiday in Ukraine. The Eastern Orthodox Churches predominantly follow the Julian calendar, and 7 January is also a public holiday in Ukraine. In December 2020, the head of the Orthodox Church of Ukraine (OCU), Metropolitan Epiphanius, said that changing the date of Christmas to 25 December in Ukraine is possible after both the church and the faithful are ready for such a decision, after conducting educational work. It was stated that the postponement of the celebration of the nativity of The Lord would entail a change in the dates of all fixed holidays to 13 days ago. In December 2020, the head of the Ukrainian Greek Catholic Church (UGCC), Patriarch Sviatoslav, stated that the Greek Catholic Church would resolve this issue "together with our Orthodox brothers". He also noted that this issue is not dogmatic, it should overcome church divisions, not cause new ones, and in his opinion, the transition to celebrating Christmas in a new style — 25 December, should be initiated by the laity.

About a hundred parishes of the Romanian national minority in Ukraine, which are part of the Ukrainian Orthodox Church of the Moscow Patriarchate, have always celebrated Christmas on 25 December according to the Revised Julian calendar, just like the Romanian Orthodox Church.

On 18 October 2022, the OCU allowed dioceses to hold Christmas services according to the Revised Julian calendar, i.e., 25 December. In the case of a divine service, its participants are released from the restrictions of fasting on this day.

On 24 December 2022, during an audience, Major Archbishop Sviatoslav handed over to Metropolitan Epiphanius for review a letter outlining the considerations of the UGCC hierarchs regarding the calendar reform. The primates decided to create a joint working group on specific proposals for calendar reform. The joint group is initiated on the occasion of the celebration of the 1700th anniversary of the First Ecumenical Council, held in Nicaea in 325. In this Council, in particular, the calendar principles of church life were determined.

On 2 February 2023, the Holy Synod of the OCU allowed and approved the procedure for blessing parishes and monasteries for the full use of the Revised Julian calendar, and on 24 May 2023, to hold a meeting of the Council of Bishops, where the issue of calendar reform will be raised.

In February 2023 the UGCC decided to switch to the Revised Julian calendar for fixed holidays (і.e., except for Easter) from September 2023. Parishes of the UGCC that are not ready to switch to the new style in 2023 have a transition period until 1 September 2025, to make the change.

Effective 24 May 2023, the OCU officially declared that 25 December will be the permanent date for Christmas commemorations and festivities for the Ukrainian Orthodox faithful, as the Church officially formalized the adoption of the Revised Julian calendar for fixed feasts and solemnities in line with the other Orthodox churches of the world, with Easter kept in the old Julian Calendar. On 27 July, the Local Council approved the transition.

On 28 June 2023 President of Ukraine, Volodymyr Zelenskyy, submitted to the Verkhovna Rada (Ukraine's national parliament) a draft law removing the Julian Calendar Christmas holiday on 7 January and confirming the 25 December date as the sole day of celebrations, reflecting changes in the OCU and UGCC calendars. Parliament passed this law on 14 July 2023 with 241 deputies voting in the affirmative. Zelenskyy signed the law on 28 July 2023.

According to a study conducted by the international company Deloitte in November 2023, after the transition of Ukrainian Christian churches to the new style, the majority of Ukrainians (about 45%) will celebrate Christmas on 25 December and only 17% on 7 January, and 32% plan to celebrate twice. In 2023, for the first time since 1917, Christmas Day in Ukraine was marked on just one day – 25 December, the same date across almost all Christian faiths around the globe.

The Armenian Diocese of Ukraine of the Armenian Apostolic Church and the Armenian Catholic Church in Ukraine celebrates Christmas from 5 January to 6 January along with Epiphany according to the Gregorian calendar.

== Sviatyi Vechir (Holy Evening) ==
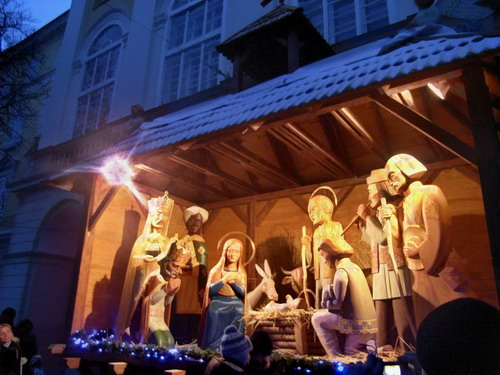
Nativity scene

Christmas Eve on 24 December is called Sviatyi Vechir (Святий вечір) or Sviatvechir (Святвечір) in Ukraine ("Holy Evening"), and has many customs and rituals, most of which predate the introduction of Christianity to Ukraine. Traditions include decorating house and dinner table with special attributes (a symbolic sheaf of wheat called the didukh, garlic, hay, and others), performing koliadky ('carols') and so on. Each ritual has its own meaning and purpose, as such a few wisps of hay on the embroidered tablecloth as a reminder of the manger in Bethlehem. One prominent custom of the night is a special supper, called Sviata Vecheria ("Holy Supper").

On the afternoon of the day, a St. Basil Divine Liturgy is held in parishes to mark the formal close of the Christmas Fast within the OCU and UGCC that began in November, which includes commemorations of the Holodomor of the 1930s, the liturgy follows a Christmas version of the Royal Hours.

Ukrainians of the OCU and UGCC fast and abstain on Sviatyi Vechir (Latin Church Catholics and Protestants may choose also to follow tradition on said day) - it is one of a few paramony days in the Eastern Rite calendar wherein mandatory fasting and abstinence is observed; only when the first star is seen in the evening sky, or just after the faithful have received Communion in the afternoon service, may the supper begin. The family comes together to have a dinner which usually includes 12 dishes (the number can vary from 7–17). These twelve dishes are traditionally vegan plus fish, and do not contain meat, milk, or eggs. While the dishes served can vary regionally, as well as from family to family, the two mandatory dishes are uzvar and kutia, both reckoned by ethnographer Khvedir Vovk to be remnants of ancient rituals which date back to the Neolithic era. Kutia (a dish of grain, honey and poppy seeds) is traditionally served first at the meal, after being offered by the head of the household to the frost. A spoonful is tossed at the ceiling, and in rural townships the number of poppy seeds which stick portends the bountyfulness of the fields, orchards and farm animals in the coming year. It is rarely served at other times of the year. Uzvar is a beverage, made with cooked dried fruits and berries. It can be mixed in with the kutia, or served separately at the end of the meal. Servings of both dishes are also set aside overnight in the pokuttia, the corner of the house with the Orthodox/Eastern Catholic icons or Latin Catholic images of saints, for deceased ancestors within the family or, in recent cases, for family members killed during the Russo-Ukrainian War (especially those who were KIA in the Armed Forces of Ukraine and other uniformed organizations).

The All-Night Christmas Vigil then follows, families then troop to their local parish churches or Protestant churches to attend as thanksgiving for the Savior's birth in a stable. OCU and UGCC Divine Liturgy, Catholic Midnight Mass or a Protestant service would then traditionally follow. On Christmas Eve night a shopka (vertep), a traditional portable nativity scene, carried by children or adults alike, and used to represent the Nativity and other figures in a puppet form, is brought out in public, the portable tall box is either accompanied by singing carollers or crowds either before or after the vigil service.

The principal national television and online services on the night are beamed live from:

- for the OCU, Saint Sophia Cathedral, Kyiv
- for the UGCC, Cathedral of the Resurrection of Christ, Kyiv
- for Latin Rite Catholics: Cathedral Basilica of the Assumption, Lviv and/or Co-Cathedral of St. Alexander, Kyiv

== Christmas Day ==
Following the Vigil, on 25 December families return to the aforementioned places of worship for Mass, Divine Liturgy or a holiday service. Unlike the previous day, for members of the OCU and UGCC, meat and other foods are eaten during the day. This day and the days following up to 4 January are considered as fast-free days.

== Koliadky (Caroling) ==
At the end of the Sviata Vechera, and the vigil that follows, Ukrainian families often sing carols (koliadky). In some communities the ancient Ukrainian tradition of caroling is carried on by groups of young people and members of organizations and churches calling at homes and collecting donations. Well-known carols include Nova radist stala, Boh predvichnyi narodyvsia, Dobryi vechir tobi, pane hospodariu, Vo Vyfleiemi nyni novyna, Nebo i zemlia nyni torzhestvuiut, and Boh sia rozhdaie.

== Didukh (grandfather) ==
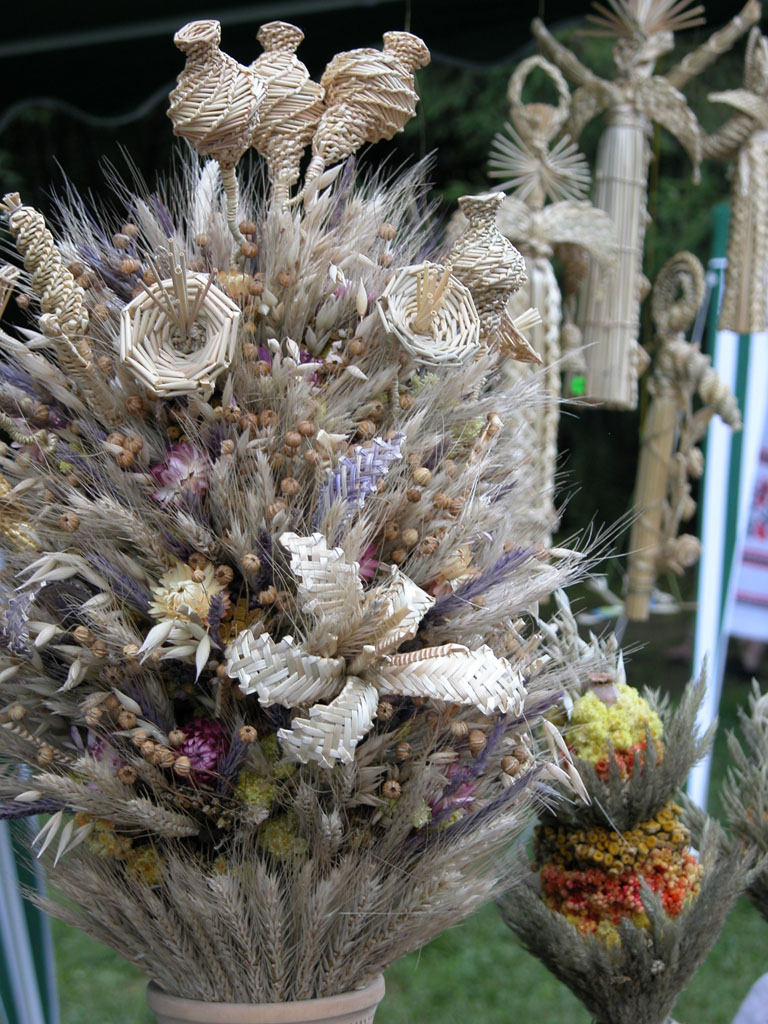

In villages (farming communities), the head of the household brings in a sheaf of grain called the didukh, which represents the importance of the ancient and rich wheat crops of Ukraine, the staff of life through the centuries. Didukh means literally "grandfather spirit" so it symbolizes the family's ancestors. In Ukrainian city homes the didukh may be purchased, and is often made of woven grain and dried grasses and flowers.

== See also ==
- Old New Year
- Koliadka

== Sources ==
- Hughes, Ellen (1997). Christmas in Ukraine. Chicago: World Book Inc. ISBN 978-0-7166-0897-4.
