= Armenian Cathedral of Lviv =

Armenian Apostolic cathedral in Lviv, Ukraine

Coordinates: 49°50′36″N 24°01′51″E

- Armenian Cathedral of the Assumption of Mary
- Հայկական տաճար
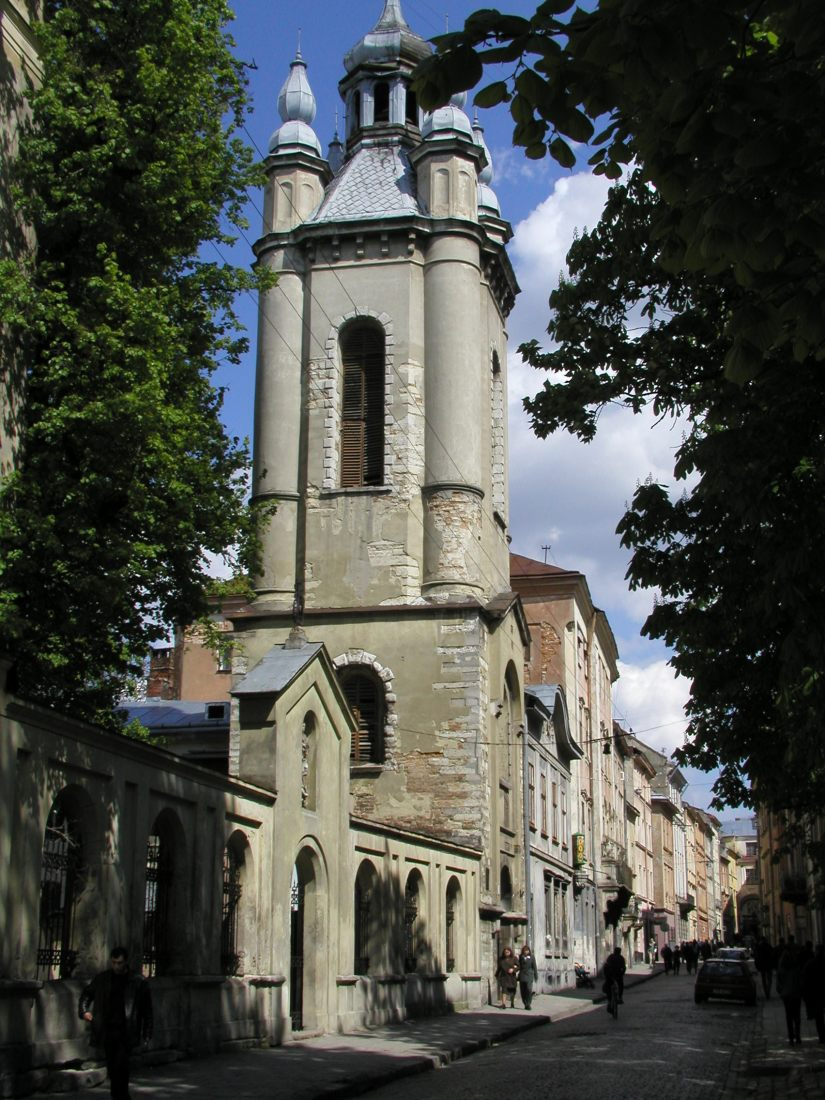
- Armenian Cathedral of Lviv
- Address: Old Town, Lviv
- Country: Ukraine
- Denomination: Armenian Apostolic Church
- Previous denomination: Catholic Church (Armenian Catholic Church)

Architecture
- Years built: 1363–1370

The Armenian Cathedral of the Assumption of Mary (Armenian: Հայկական տաճար; Ukrainian: Вірменський собор, romanized: Virmenskyi sobor; Polish: Katedra ormiańska) in Lviv, Ukraine is located in the city's Old Town, north of the market square. Until 1945 it was the cathedral of the Armenian Catholic Archeparchy of Lviv. Since 2000 it has served as the cathedral of the Armenian Diocese of Ukraine.

== History ==
=== 1363–1945 ===
A small Armenian church was built between 1363 and 1370, founded by an Armenian merchant from Caffa. Established as the mother church of an eparchy, it was modelled on the Cathedral of Ani, the ancient Armenian capital. In 1437, the cathedral was surrounded with an arcade gallery; the southern part is preserved, and the northern portion has been rebuilt into a sacristy.

In 1527, the cathedral was damaged by fire. A a new stone bell tower was erected in 1571. In 1630 the main nave; it was extended when it was rebuilt in 1723.

From the 17th century until 1945, the cathedral belonged to the Armenian Catholic archdiocese of Lviv, when bishop Mikołaj (Nicolas) Torosowicz in 1630 and his successor Vartan Hunanyan (1681) united the Armenian and Roman Catholic Churches, over a century before the official birth (1742) of the Armenian Catholic Church. The cathedral underwent a restoration between 1908 and 1927.

=== 1945–present ===
Lviv was a city in the Second Polish Republic from 1920 until after the Second World War, when it was annexed by the Soviet Union. In 1945, the new Soviet authorities abolished the Armenian Catholic Archdiocese of Lviv, and arrested its administrator, Dionizy Kajetanowicz. (Note: Kajetanowicz and three other priests were murdered in a Soviet gulag in 1954.) Almost all the city's Polish Armenians were expelled to modern-day Poland. The cathedral was closed, and its building was used for storing plundered sacred art. Officially, the Armenian Catholic Archdiocese of Lviv still exists, but it has remained vacant since 1938.

After the collapse of the Soviet Union, Armenian Catholic families attempted to re-establish the parish. Armenians belonging to the Armenian Apostolic Church who came to Lviv during the Soviet times also sought to acquire the cathedral. Shortly before the visit of Pope John Paul II to Lviv, the local Ukrainian authorities granted the cathedral to the Armenian Apostolic Church, with the condition that the Armenian Catholic and Armenian Apostolic communities could both use it. An Armenian Apostolic eparchy was established in Lviv in 1997.

On 18 May 2003, the cathedral was re-consecrated by the Catholicos of All Armenians Karekin II and three other Armenian Apostolic bishops. Among the guests who attended the ceremony were the Speaker of the Armenian parliament Armen Khachatryan, former President of Ukraine Leonid Kravchuk, the president of the Union of Armenians in Ukraine, the French-Armenian singer Charles Aznavour with his son, Armenian actor Armen Dzhigarkhanyan and the Armenian ambassador to Ukraine, Hrachya Silvanyan. The Ukrainian Orthodox Church of the Moscow Patriarchate was represented by bishop Augustin. The Ukrainian Greek Catholic Church was represented by Mikhail Dymyd. The head of the Religions State Agency Victor Bondarenko represented the Ukrainian government. Neither Polish Armenians nor any Armenian Catholic clergymen were invited.

In 2009, the cathedral began a renovation process, fully financed by the Polish Ministry of Culture in cooperation with the Foundation of Culture and Heritage of Polish Armenians seated in Warsaw. The works are being conducted jointly by Polish and Ukrainian specialists.

== Interior and surroundings ==
Just north of the cathedral lies a small convent of Armenian Benedictines, and to the south, adjoining the bell tower, the palace of the Armenian archbishops, both built in the late 17th century. The present-day interior is largely the work of Jan Henryk Rosen and Józef Mehoffer. The cathedral holds two wonder-working icons of St. Gregory the Illuminator and the Mother of God, brought in the 17th century from Yazlovets.

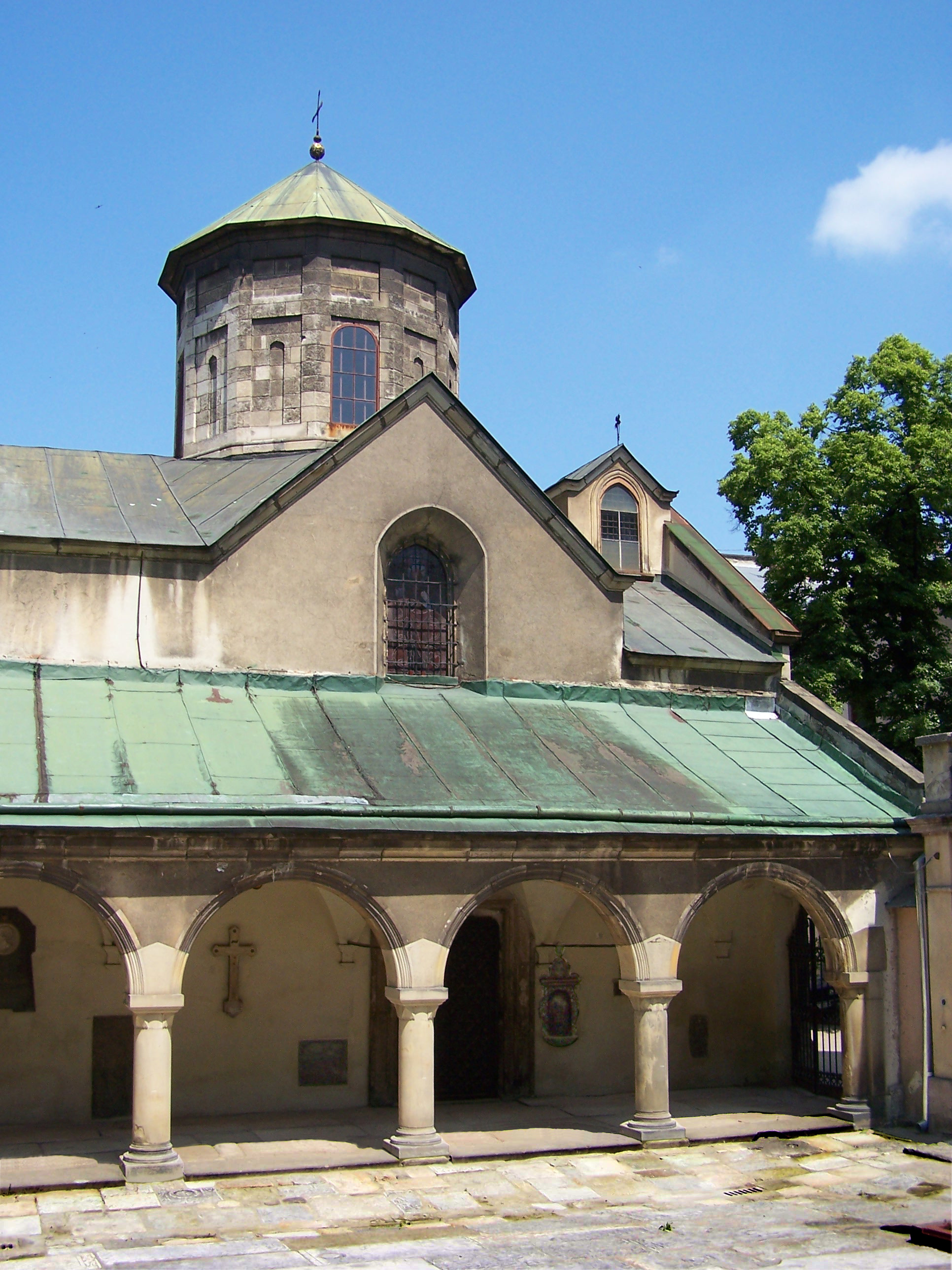
The oldest preserved part of the cathedral, with Renaissance arcades

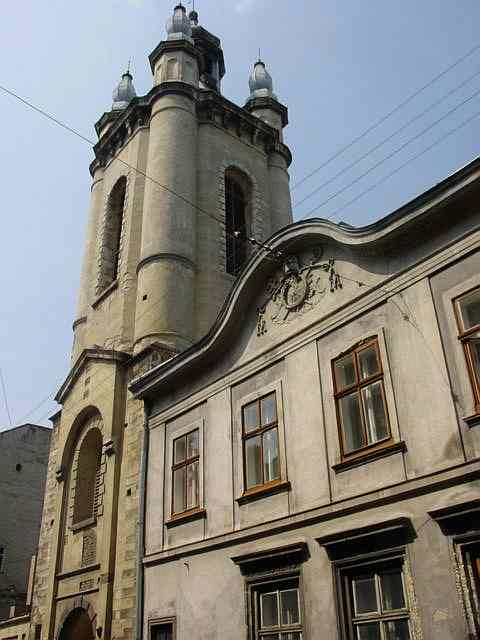
Belltower and bishop's palace
