= Kutia =

Sweet grain pudding, traditionally served in Eastern Europe

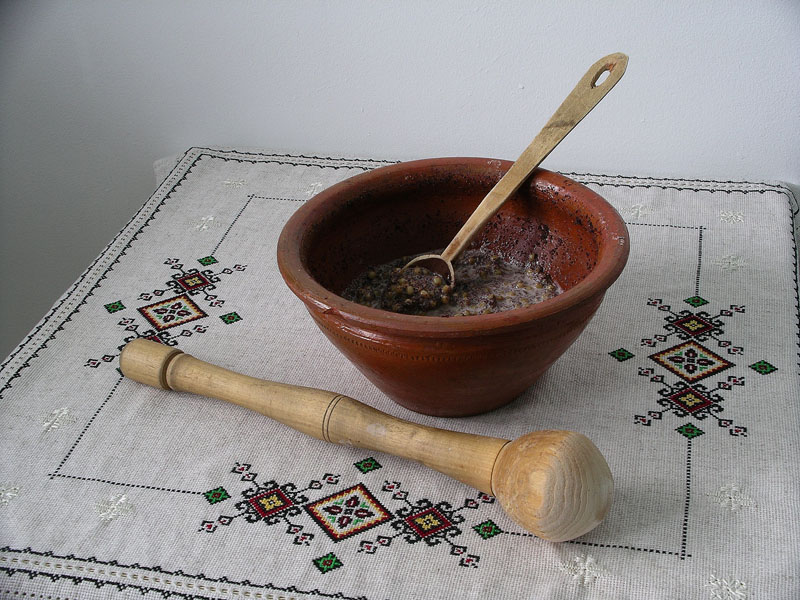
- Associated cuisine: Belarusian, Lithuanian, Polish, Russian, Ukrainian, Armenian
- Main ingredients: Wheatberries, poppy seeds, honey or sugar, various nuts and sometimes raisins

Kutia or kutya is a ceremonial grain dish in syrup traditionally served predominantly in Belarusian, Lithuanian, Polish, and Ukrainian cuisines, but also in parts of Russia. It is consumed by both Eastern Orthodox Christians and Catholics, though whether it is served on Christmas–Feast of Jordan holiday season or as part of a funeral feast can vary among countries and regions. The word with a descriptor is also used to describe the eves of Christmas, New Year, and Feast of Jordan days.

== Etymology ==
The word kutia is a borrowing from the Greek language κουκκί ('bean') or κόκκος ('grain'). The dish has a similar name across the countries where it is traditionally consumed, such as Belarusian: куцця [kuˈt͡sʲːa], Polish: kutia [ˈkutja], Russian: кутья [kʊˈtʲja], and Ukrainian: кутя [kʊˈtʲɑ], except in Armenia where it is called anoush abour (անուշապուր), meaning "sweet wheat".

== In Ukraine ==
In Ukraine kutіa is one of the two essential ritual dishes at the Ukrainian Christmas Eve supper (also known as Svyata vecherya). The ritual significance of kutia, as well as uzvar, is quite ancient. Ukrainian ethnographer Fedir Vovk traces the origins of these dishes to the Neolithic era. Before dinner, the kutia is placed in the icon corner ("kut"), the most honorable place in the house where religious icons or images are placed. The pot with the kutia was to stand there in a designated spot from Rizdvo (Christmas on December 25) to January 1, New Year's Day (formerly January 6 to the Old New Year in January 14). There is also a custom of sending children with kutia to relatives, usually grandparents and godparents. After dinner, the kutia is left on the table for the whole night with spoons for the dead ancestors, "so that our relatives would have dinner and not be angry with us." The religious nature of the dish is emphasized by an ancient custom, when the head of the family approached the window or went out into the yard with a spoonful of kutia and, addressing the frost, invited him three times to take part in dinner with the family. When the frost does not appear, he is advised not to appear, not to do harm to crops, etc.: "Frost, frost, come to us to eat kutia, and if you don't come, don't come for the rye, wheat and other crops."

Kutia is the first out of twelve dishes served for Svyata vecherya to be tasted. The head of the family takes the first spoon of the kutia, raises it up and calls out to the souls of departed family members to join them on this night. He then tastes the kutia, and throws the rest of the spoonful up to the ceiling. In rural towns, as many kernels of grain as stick to the ceiling, there should be swarms of bees and newborn cattle in the coming year. In the same vein, if there are many poppy seeds that remain on the ceiling, there would be a chance for hens laying more eggs in the coming year than usual. In cities the same would imply a prosperous new year for the family and also a show of remembrance for their rural roots. Everyone present eats a spoonful of kutia, after which the other dishes are brought out and eaten.

The main ingredients used to make traditional kutia are wheatberries, poppy seeds and honey. At times, walnuts, dried fruit and raisins are added as well. Kutia is a Lenten dish and no milk or egg products can be used in this – since December 24 is a paramony – strict fasting and abstinence – day in the Eastern Orthodox Church and in Byzantine Rite Catholics. There are known kutia recipes that use pearl barley or millet instead of wheatberries. Starting from the mid-19th century, the use of rice instead of traditional wheat grain in kutia became common among urban and artstocratic families of Ukraine, who used that then exotic ingredient to underline their higher social status compared to common folk.

Kolyvo is a Ukrainian ritual dish similar to kutia, but includes no poppy seeds. Kolyvo is served at remembrance services.

== In Poland ==
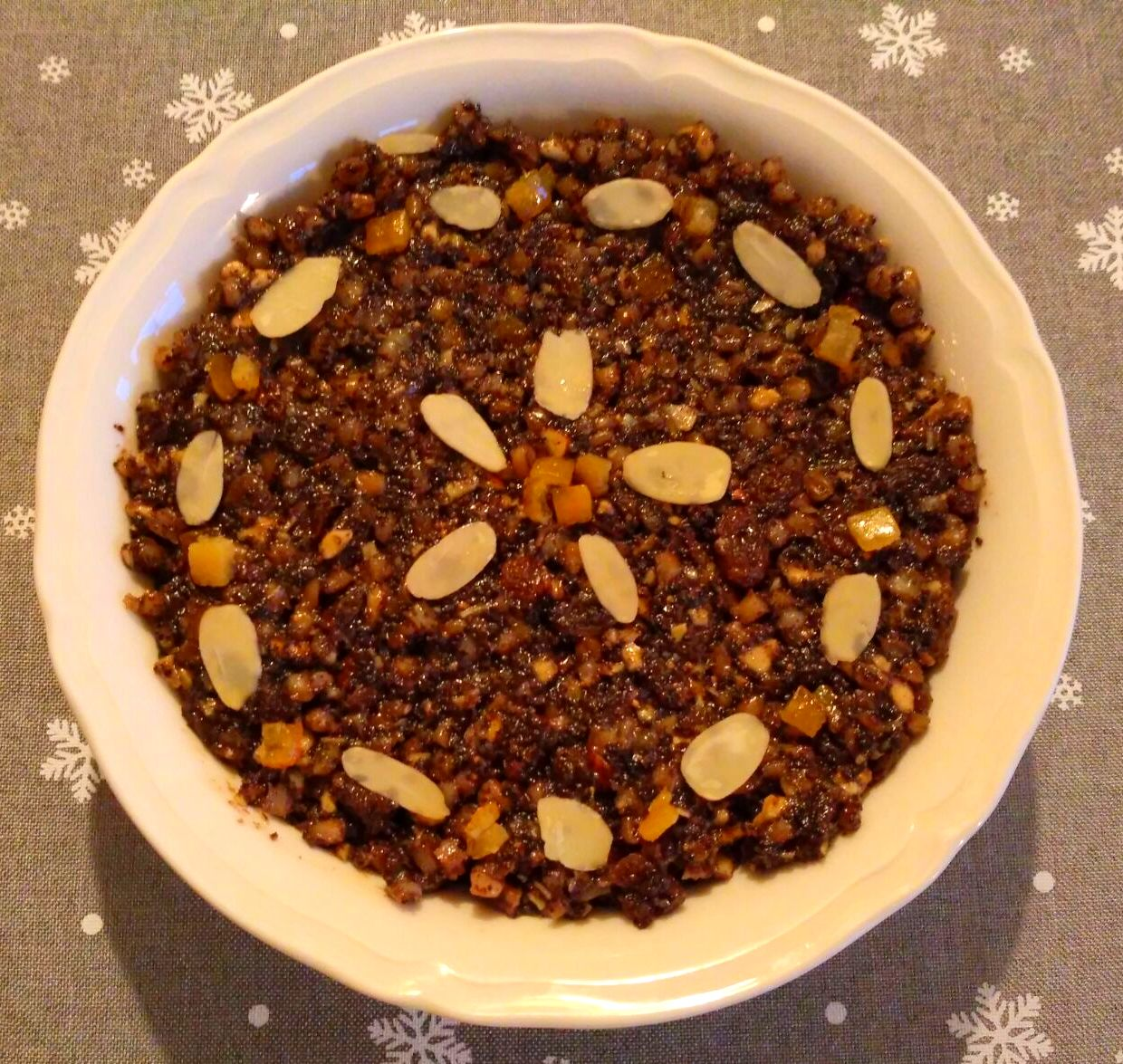
Polish kutia

Kutya is known in Poland as kutia and kucja, and it can be served as part of the Twelve-dish Christmas Eve supper, though its origins predate Christianity in Poland and can be traced back to customs of the Slavic Native Faith. However, it is eaten primarily (though not exclusively) in the eastern regions of Podlasie, the Lublin area, and Subcarpathia, near the borders with Belarus and Ukraine. It can also be commonly found among Bug River Poles and other generations with ancestry in the Eastern Borderlands, who are scattered across all of Poland. Besides Wigilia, kutia is also served on New Year's Eve and other special occasions, such as wakes.

Traditional old Polish kutia is made using wheat, poppy seeds (ground in a special pot called makutra), honey, raisins, walnuts or hazelnuts, almonds, and vanilla; some recipes also include milk or śmietana. Kutia is sometimes prepared using rice or kasha instead of wheat.

A number of customs and rituals in Polish tradition, such as fortune telling, are associated with kutia. This is particularly true for older generations and rural areas of eastern Poland, as well as their descendants who can be found across all regions of Poland. Kutia is also eaten among the Ukrainian and Belarusian minorities living in Poland.

== In Armenia ==
In Armenia, Kutia is called "Anoush Abour" (անուշապուր), and the main difference in preparation is that poppy seeds are sometime omitted. It is often decorated with pomegranates seeds. According to one tradition, it is claimed that when the ark came to rest on Mount Ararat, the family of Noah celebrated with a special dish. Since their supplies were nearly exhausted, what was left (primarily grains, dried fruits and the like) was cooked together to form a pudding and that "pudding" is now called anoushabour.

Armenians make anoushabur to commemorate this event, but also other events. After a baby is born, Armenian families observe a period of seclusion for up to 40 days, culminating in a baptism ceremony (knunk). In general, Armenians enjoy anoushabur as a part of festive spreads. Armenian sources note it was cleverly used to maintain the fast, yet celebrate Christmas eve with a sweet treat. It’s also used in thanksgiving offerings, during weddings or house blessings. Sharing Anoushabur is a gesture of communal warmth, linking family, faith, and gratitude. Anoushabur is distributed to the poor, as well as to neighbors, friends and relatives. Since Armenians serve this pudding during Christmas (6 January) and on New Year's Eve (Armenians of Jerusalem celebrate it at 13 January), it is sometimes called "Armenian Christmas Pudding".

This traditional Armenian sweet porridge is made from wheat or barley, dried fruits (such as apricots, raisins, and prunes), sugar, spices (like vanilla and cinnamon) and nuts (almonds and pistachios are most common). The grains are simmered until tender, then combined with the fruits and nuts, then sweetened, and flavored with rose water and the spices. Anoushabur may be garnished with pomegranate seeds, dried fruits and cinnamon. The pudding may be accompanied by multiple Armenian desserts and nuts, such as almonds or pistachios.

Anoushabur (անուշապուր) is a compound Armenian word. "Anoush" (անուշ) means sweet and "Abur" (ապուր) means soup or porridge, so the word Anoushabur literally means "Sweet soup" or "Sweet porridge".

== Other countries ==
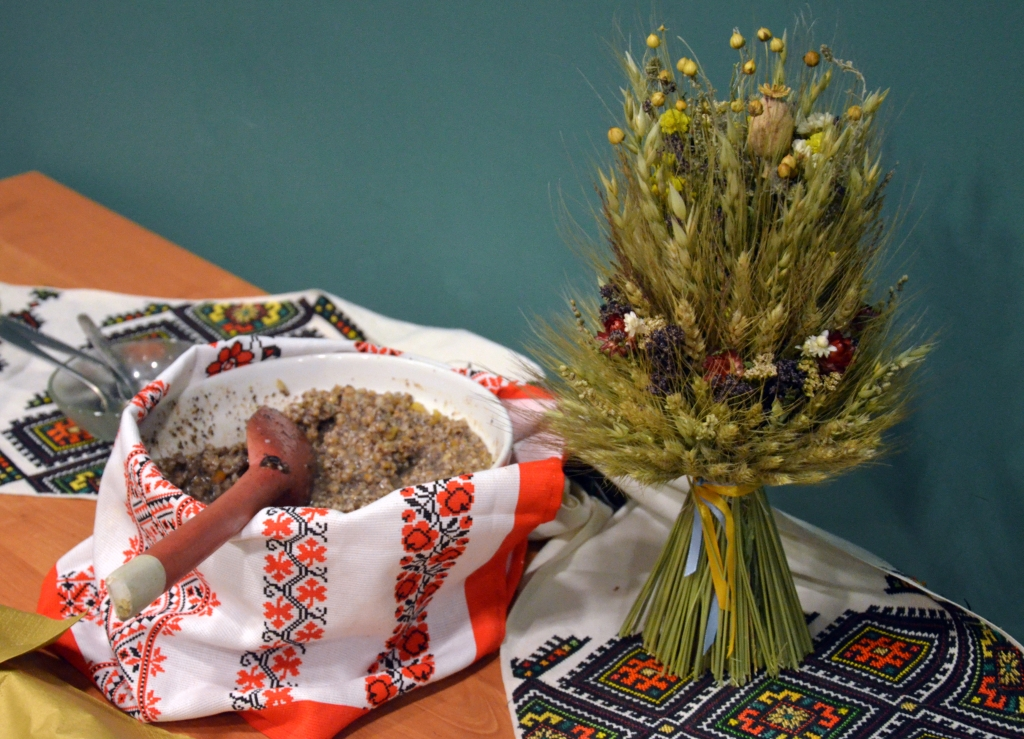
Kutya and didukh as part of Ukrainian Orthodox Christmas celebrations in Poland

A dish of boiled grains (usually wheat berries) mixed with honey, nuts, spices, and a few other ingredients is traditional in other countries as well:

- Armenia – anoush abour
- Bulgaria – kolivo
- Greece – koliva
- Lebanon, Palestine and Jordan – ameh masslouk or snuniye
- Romania – colivă
- Russia – (also) sochivo
- Serbia – koljivo (to wit: sacrifice), or simply: žito (ie, wheat)
- Sicily – cuccìa
- Syria – sliha or burbara (for Eid il-Bur-bara, St. Barbara's Feast throughout the Middle East)

Somewhat similar, but with a different origin, and somewhat different ingredients, is the Islamic, especially Turkish, sweet dish of Ashure.

== See also ==
- Frumenty
- Koliva
- List of desserts
- List of porridges
- Memorial service in the Eastern Orthodox Church
- Slava (tradition)
