= Armenian Diocese of Southern Russia =

Diocese of Southern Russia Հարավային Ռուսաստանի թեմ Епархия Юга России
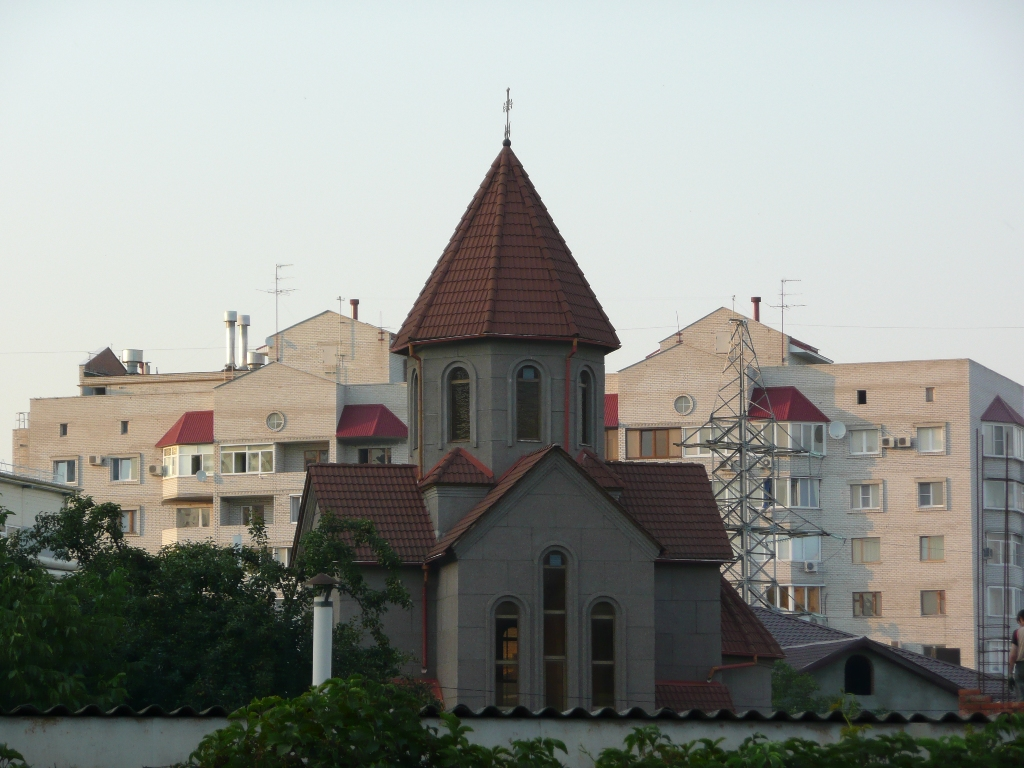
- Church of St. John the Evangelist (Krasnodar, Russia)

Location
- Country: Russia
- Territory: Krasnodar and Stavropol krais, the republics of Adygea, Chechnya, Dagestan, Ingushetia, Kabardino-Balkaria, Karachay-Cherkessia, North Ossetia, Abkhazia

Information
- Denomination: Armenian Apostolic Church
- Rite: Armenian Rite
- Established: January 13, 1997
- Cathedral: Church of St. John the Evangelist, Krasnodar

Current leadership
- Patriarch: Karekin II
- Bishop: Archbishop Movses (Movsesyan)

The Diocese of Southern Russia (Armenian: Հարավային Ռուսաստանի թեմ; Russian: Епархия Юга России) is a diocese of the Armenian Apostolic Church. The canonical territory of the diocese includes regions in the south of the European part of Russia: Krasnodar and Stavropol krais, the republics of Adygea, Chechnya, Dagestan, Ingushetia, Kabardino-Balkaria, Karachay-Cherkessia, North Ossetia, and, in fact, Abkhazia (officially, the territory of the latter belongs to the Georgian diocese).

On January 13, 1997, by decree of Catholicos of All Armenians Karekin I, the Diocese of Russia and New Nakhichevan (under its jurisdiction were the Armenian churches of Russia, Ukraine, Belarus, Moldova, the Baltic States and Central Asia) was divided into three dioceses:

- The Diocese of Russia and New Nakhichevan with a see in Moscow
- The Diocese of the Southern of Russia with a see in Krasnodar
- The Diocese of Ukraine with a see in Lviv

On September 23, 2009, the residence of the Head of the Diocese was opened on the territory of the Church of St. John the Evangelist in Krasnodar.

== Primates ==
- 1998-2000 - Bishop Yeznik (Petrosyan).
- Since 2000 - Archbishop Movses (Movsesyan)
