= Armenian Apostolic Church =

National church of Armenia

Armenian Apostolic Church
- Հայ Առաքելական Եկեղեցի (Armenian)
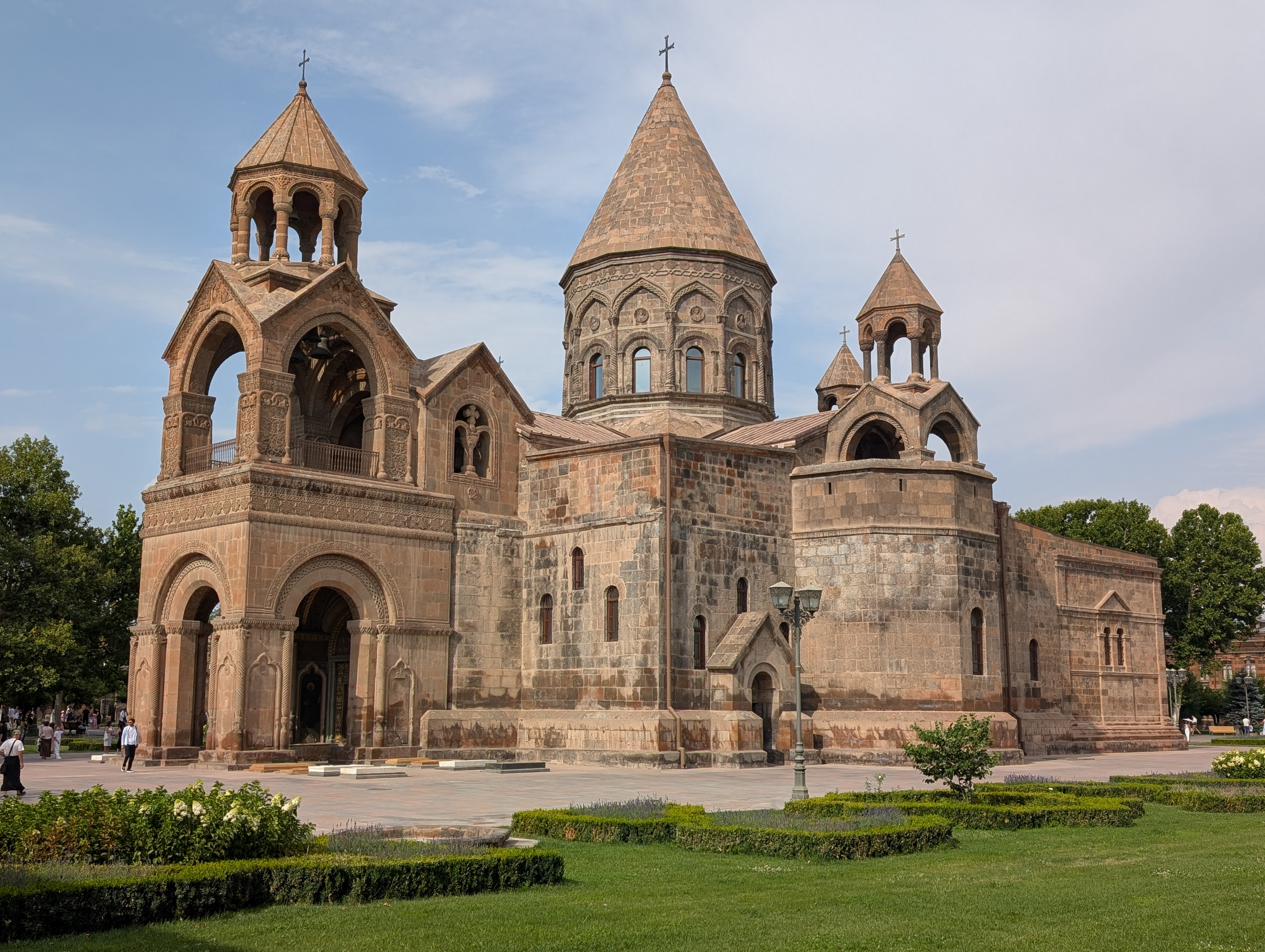
- Etchmiadzin Cathedral, the mother church of the Armenian Apostolic Church
- Type: Autocephaly
- Classification: Christian
- Orientation: Oriental Orthodox
- Scripture: Septuagint, New Testament, Armenian versions
- Theology: Oriental Orthodox Theology
- Polity: Episcopal
- Catholicos of All Armenians: Karekin II
- Associations: World Council of Churches
- Region: Armenia, Armenian diaspora
- Language: Classical Armenian
- Liturgy: Armenian Rite
- Headquarters: Mother See of Holy Etchmiadzin
- Founder: Gregory the Illuminator (historical); Bartholomew the Apostle and Thaddeus (Jude) (traditional)
- Origin: c. 1st century (traditional); 301/314 AD (historical); Kingdom of Greater Armenia
- Independence: late 4th century, Metropolitanate of Caesarea in Cappadocia
- Separated from: Chalcedonian Christianity (Byzantine Church) in the Second Council of Dvin (554)
- Separations: Armenian Catholic Church; Armenian Evangelical Church
- Members: 6 million
- Official website: armenianchurch.org
- Logo

The Armenian Apostolic Church (Armenian: Հայ Առաքելական Եկեղեցի, romanized: Hay Aṙak‘elakan Ékełetsi) (Note: Officially Hayastaniayts Aṙakʼelakan Surb Yekeghetsi (Հայաստանեայց Առաքելական Սուրբ Եկեղեցի)) is the autocephalous national church of Armenia. Part of Oriental Orthodoxy, it is one of the most ancient Christian churches. The Armenian Apostolic Church uses the Armenian Rite. The Kingdom of Armenia was the first state in history to adopt Christianity as its official religion (under the Armenian Apostolic traditions) during the rule of King Tiridates III, of the Arsacid dynasty in the early 4th century.

According to tradition, the church originated in the missions of apostles Bartholomew and Thaddeus (Jude) in the 1st century. St. Gregory the Illuminator was the first official primate of the church. It is sometimes referred to as the Armenian Apostolic Orthodox Church, Armenian Church, or Armenian Gregorian Church.

The Armenian Apostolic Church should not be confused with the fully distinct Armenian Catholic Church, which is an Eastern Catholic church in communion with the See of Rome.

== History ==
=== Origins and early church history ===
The Armenian Apostolic Church believes in apostolic succession through the apostles Bartholomew and Thaddeus (Jude). According to tradition, the latter of the two apostles is said to have cured Abgar V of Edessa of leprosy with the Image of Edessa, leading to his conversion. Thaddaeus was then commissioned by Abgar to proselytize throughout Armenia, where he converted King Sanatruk's daughter, who was eventually martyred alongside Thaddeus when Sanatruk later fell into apostasy. After this, Bartholomew came to Armenia, bringing a portrait of the Virgin Mary, which he placed in a nunnery he founded over a former temple of Anahit. Bartholomew then converted the sister of Sanatruk, who once again martyred a female relative and the apostle who converted her. Both apostles ordained native bishops before their execution, and some other Armenians had been ordained outside of Armenia by James the Just. Scholars including Bart Ehrman, Han J.W. Drijvers, and Walter Bauer dismiss the conversion of Abgar V as fiction.

According to Eusebius and Tertullian, Armenian Christians were persecuted by kings Axidares, Khosrov I, and Tiridates III, the last of whom was converted to Christianity by Gregory the Illuminator. Ancient Armenia was the first state to adopt Christianity as a state religion, which has been referred to by Nina Garsoïan as "probably the most crucial step in its history." This conversion distinguished it from its Iranian and Mazdean roots and protected it from further Parthian influence. According to Mary Boyce, the acceptance of Christianity by the Arsacid-Armenian rulers was partly in defiance of the Sassanids.

When King Tiridates III made Christianity the state religion of Armenia between 300 and 301, it was not an entirely new religion there. It had penetrated the country from at least the third century, and may have been present even earlier.

Tiridates declared Gregory to be the first Catholicos of the Armenian Apostolic Church and sent him to Caesarea to be consecrated. Upon his return, Gregory tore down shrines to idols, built churches and monasteries, and ordained many priests and bishops. While meditating in the old capital city of Vagharshapat, Gregory had a vision of Christ descending to the earth and striking it with a hammer. From that spot arose a great Christian temple with a huge cross. He was convinced that God intended him to build the main Armenian church there. With the king's help he did so in accordance with his vision, renaming the city Etchmiadzin, which means "the place of the descent of the Only-Begotten".

Initially, the Armenian Apostolic Church participated in the larger Christian world and was subordinated to the Bishop of Caesarea. Its catholicos was represented at the First Council of Nicea (325). St. Vrtanes I, the third Catholicos of the Armenian Apostolic Church (333–341), sent a letter with specific questions to Macarius, the Orthodox Bishop of Jerusalem (312–335/36), taken to Jerusalem by a delegation of Armenian priests on the occasion of the Encaenia, in dedication of the Church of the Holy Sepulchre in September 335. In Macarius's letter to the Armenians in 335, it seeks to correct irregularities in the initiation rites of baptism and the eucharist in use in the Armenian Church by articulating the practices in Jerusalem. In so doing, it reveals the divergent forms being practiced in Armenia, which have strong echoes of old East Syriac Rite. Orthopraxy was conceived by Vrtanes and his Armenian colleagues in terms of liturgical performance in Jerusalem. In 353, King Papas (Pap) appointed Catholicos Husik without first sending him to Caesarea for commissioning. The Armenian catholicos was still represented at the First Council of Constantinople (381).

As Gregory was consecrated by the bishop of Caesarea, he also accepted the Byzantine Rite. However, the Armenian Church, due to the influence of the Church in Edessa, the large presence of Syriacs in Armenia, as well as the number of Syriac priests that arrived in Armenia with Gregory, also cultivated the West Syriac or Antiochian Rite. Since Armenians at the time did not have an alphabet, its clergy learned Greek and Syriac. From this synthesis, the new Armenian Rite came about, which had similarities both with the Byzantine and the Antiochian Syriac rite.

=== Expansion of Armenian Christian identity ===
Christianity was strengthened in Armenia in the 5th century by the translation of the Bible into the Armenian language by the native theologian, monk, and scholar, Saint Mesrop Mashtots. Before the 5th century, Armenians had a spoken language, but no script. Thus, the Bible and liturgy were written in the Greek or Syriac scripts until Catholicos Sahak Part'ew commissioned Mesrop to create the Armenian alphabet, which he completed in c. 405. Subsequently, the Bible and liturgy were translated into Armenian and written in the new script. The translation of the Bible, along with works of history, literature and philosophy, caused a flowering of Armenian literature and a broader cultural renaissance.

Although unable to attend the Council of Ephesus (431), Catholicos Isaac Parthiev (Sahak Part'ew) sent a message agreeing with its decisions. However, non-doctrinal elements in the Council of Chalcedon (451) caused certain problems to arise.

Miaphysitism spread from Syria to Armenia, from where it came to Georgia and Caucasian Albania.

In 609–610, the Third Council of Dvin was convened during the reign of Catholicos Abraham I of Aghbatank and Prince Smbat Bagratuni, with clergymen and laymen participating. The Georgian Church disagreed with the Armenian Church, having approved the Christology of Chalcedon. This council was convened to clarify the relationship between the Armenian and Georgian churches. After the council, Catholicos Abraham wrote an encyclical letter addressed to the people, blaming Catholicos Kurion of the Georgian Church and his adherents for the schism. The council never set up canons; it only deprived Georgians from taking communion in the Armenian Church.

=== Attempted reunion with the Greeks and Romans ===
By 862, the Armenian Apostolic Church and the Syriac Orthodox Church of Antioch held the Council of Shirakavan with the Eastern Orthodox Church. The purpose of the council was to seek Christian unity and clarify Christological positions. Later in the 12th century, the Armenians held the Council of Hromkla to finalize an attempted reunion with the Eastern Orthodox Church.

During the 15th century, the Armenian Church participated in the Council of Basel-Ferrara-Florence, which was an effort amongst the Roman Catholics, the Eastern Orthodox, and the Oriental Orthodox Churches at achieving unity. None of these councils resulted in any lasting, permanent reunification amongst the various Christian churches.

=== Russian and Ottoman persecution ===
In 1828, Eastern Armenia became part of the Russian Empire. The activities of the Armenian Church within the Russian Empire were conducted in accordance with a special "Regulation" (the "Code of Laws of the Armenian Church") approved by the Emperor in 1836. By 1903, the Tsarist government moved to confiscate the property of the Armenian Church, only to be returned by 1905.

During the First World War, the Armenian Church suffered persecution from the Ottoman Empire. The Armenian genocide occurred during the war, and both clergy and laity were persecuted and murdered in an effort to ethnically cleanse the region. During and after the Armenian genocide, the Armenian diaspora spread, bringing Armenian Apostolic Christianity with them.

On April 23, 2015, the Armenian Apostolic Church canonized all the victims of the Armenian genocide; this service is believed to be the largest canonization service in history. Approximately 1.5 million is the most frequently published number of victims, however, estimates vary from 700,000 to 1,800,000. It was the first canonization by the Armenian Apostolic Church in four hundred years.

== Doctrine ==
=== Miaphysitism ===
Like all Oriental Orthodox churches, the Armenian Church has been historically referred to as miaphysis by both Roman Catholic and Eastern Orthodox theologians because it rejected the decisions of the Council of Chalcedon, which condemned the belief of one incarnate nature of Christ (monophysis) by Eutyches. This formula is not followed by the Armenian church instead the church adheres to Miaphysitism which is different. The Armenian Church officially severed ties with Rome and Constantinople in 610, during the Third Council of Dvin where the Chalcedonian dyophysite christological formula was rejected.

However, again like other Oriental Orthodox, the Armenian Apostolic Church argues that the identification as "monophysitism" is an incorrect description of its position. It considers the doctrine as taught by Eutyches and condemned at Chalcedon a heresy and disagrees with the formula defined by the Council of Chalcedon. The Armenian Church instead adheres to the doctrine defined by Cyril of Alexandria, considered as a saint by the Chalcedonian churches as well, who described Christ as being of one incarnate nature, where both divine and human nature are united (miaphysis). To distinguish this from Eutychian and other versions of monophysitism this position is called miaphysitism. Whereas the prefix "mono-" (< Greek μονο- < μόνος) means "single, alone, only", thus emphasising the singular nature of Christ, "mia" (μία "one" FEM), simply means "one" unemphatically, and allows for a compound nature.

Ecumenically, the Armenian and Roman churches established a common Christological declaration. This was also done by the Coptic, Syriac Orthodox, and Malankara Orthodox churches.

=== Women in ministry ===
The Armenian Church does not ordain women to the priesthood. Historically, however, monastic women have been ordained as deacons within a convent environment. When ordained to the diaconate, "men and women are ordained to the diaconate using the same rite, with both having functions of chanting the Gospel and serving in the Divine Liturgy." Monastic women deacons generally do not minister in traditional parish churches or cathedrals, although the late Sister Hripseme did minister and serve during public liturgies, including in the United States. The Armenian Church's last monastic deaconess was Sister Hripsime Sasounian (died in 2007) and on 25 September 2017, Ani-Kristi Manvelian, a twenty-four-year-old woman, was ordained in Tehran's St. Sarkis Mother Church as the first parish deaconess after many centuries.

Women also serve as altar girls and lay readers, especially when a parish is so small that not enough boys or men are regularly available to serve. Women commonly serve the church in the choir and at the organ, on parish councils, as volunteers for church events, fundraisers, and Sunday schools, as supporters through Women's Guilds, and as staff members in church offices. In the case of a married priest (Der Hayr), the wife of the priest generally plays an active role in the parish and is addressed by the title Yeretzgin.

== Structure and leadership ==
According to The Armenian Church by Archdeacon Dowling published in 1910, the Armenian Apostolic Church was composed of four patriarchal provinces, comprising at that date seventy-two, six, and two dioceses in Turkey, Russia, and Iran, respectively.

=== Two catholicosates ===
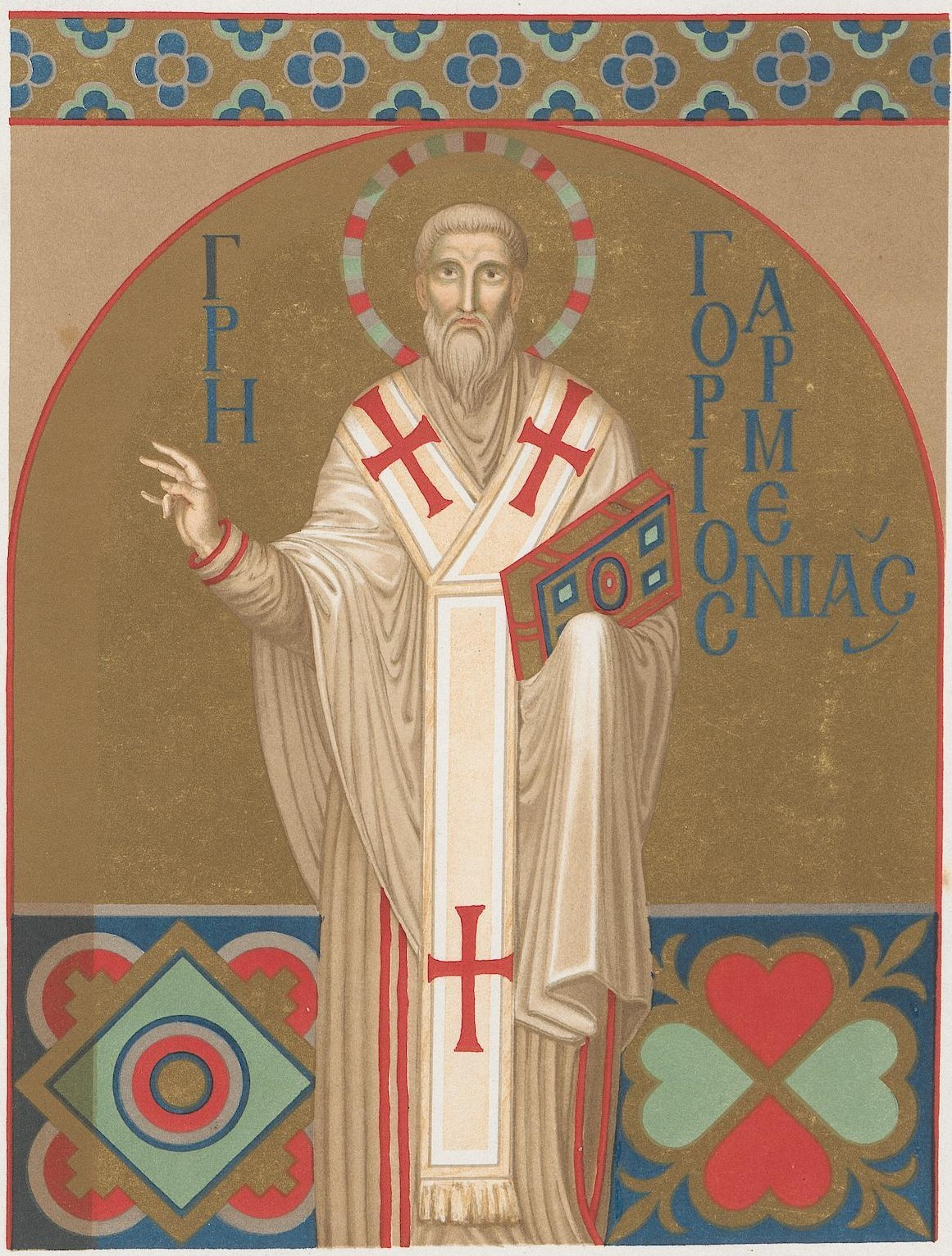
Gregory the Illuminator, first Catholicos of All Armenians

The Armenian Apostolic Church currently has two Catholicosal sees. First, there is the Mother See of Holy Etchmiadzin, headed by the Catholicos of All Armenians, who resides in Etchmiadzin, Armenia. Second, there is the Holy See of Cilicia, led by the Catholicos of Cilicia, headquartered since 1930 in Antelias, Lebanon.

The Armenian Apostolic Church is distinct from the Armenian Catholic Church, which is headed by its own catholicos-patriarch. The Armenian Catholic Church is also in full communion with the Holy See of Rome as one of the autonomous Eastern Catholic Churches.

=== Two patriarchates ===
The Armenian Apostolic Church has two patriarchates of high authority, both under the jurisdiction of the Catholicos of All Armenians:

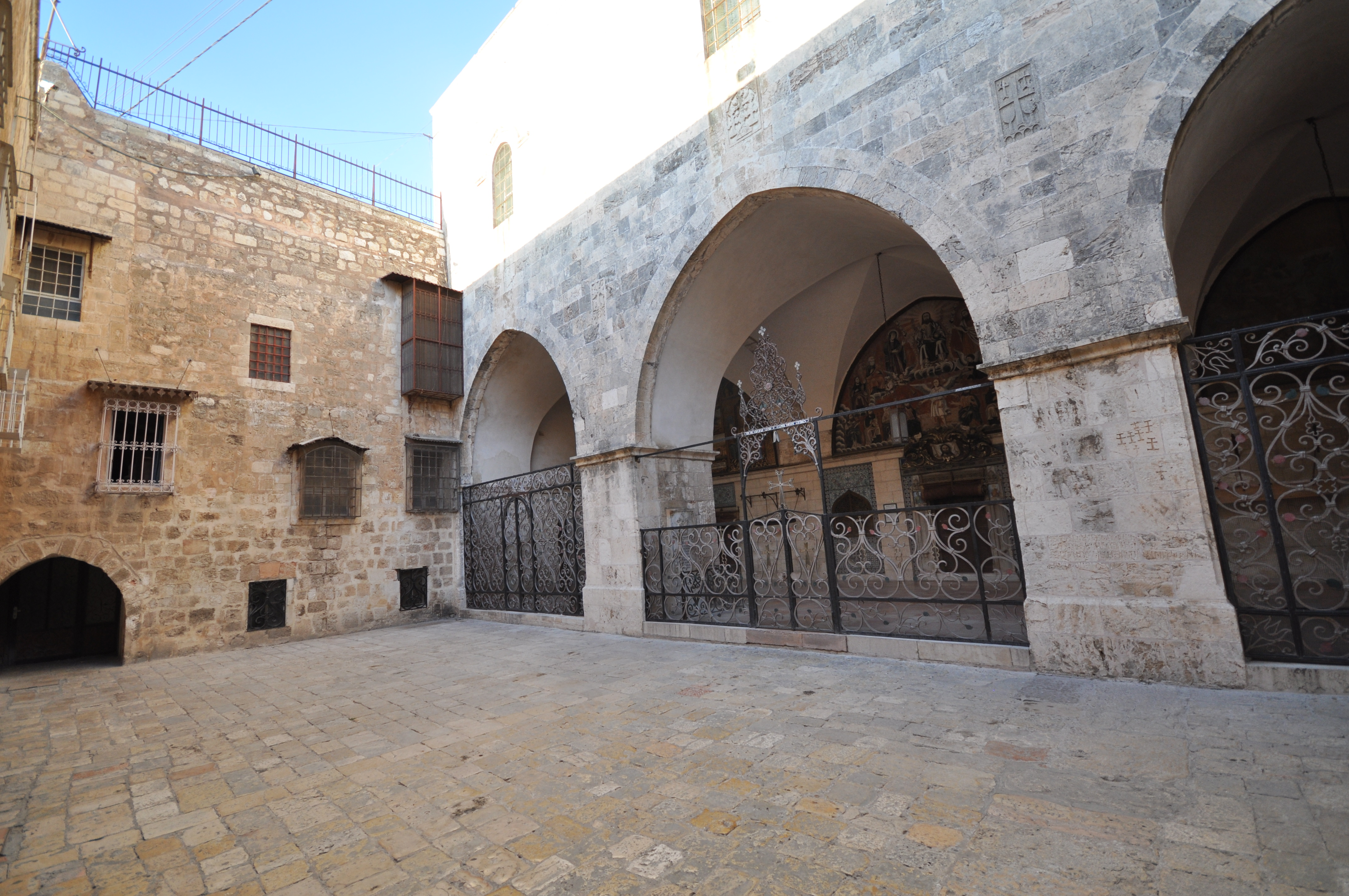
- Armenian Patriarchate of Jerusalem
  The Armenian Patriarchate of Jerusalem (Armenian: Առաքելական Աթոռ Սրբոց Յակովբեանց Յերուսաղեմ, literally Apostolic Seat of St. James in Jerusalem), whose seat is in the Armenian Quarter of Jerusalem. It is headed since 2013 by the Patriarch of Jerusalem, Archbishop Nourhan Manougian.
- The Armenian Patriarchate of Constantinople (Armenian: Պատրիարքութիւն Հայոց Կոստանդնուպոլսոյ) and All of Turkey, which has jurisdiction in the modern-day Republic of Turkey. Its seat is in Istanbul, Turkey and is headed since 2019 by the Armenian Patriarch of Constantinople, Archbishop Sahak II Mashalian.

=== Eparchies under the Catholicos of All Armenians ===
The following are eparchies primarily attached to the Catholicosate of All Armenia at the Mother See of the Holy Etchmiadzin:

==== Armenia ====
- Aragatsotn eparchy
- Diocese of Armavir
- Ararat Patriarchal eparchy
- Artik eparchy
- Gegharkunik eparchy
- Gougark eparchy
- Kotayk eparchy
- Shirak eparchy
- Syunik eparchy
- Tavush eparchy
- Vayots Dzor eparchy
- Artsakh eparchy

==== Dioceses/exarchates of the diaspora ====
Europe

- Diocese of Russia and New Nakhichevan
- Diocese of Southern Russia
- Diocese of Ukraine
- Exarchate of Central Europe
- Exarchate of Western Europe
- Diocese of Georgia
- Diocese of Romania
- Diocese of Bulgaria
- Diocese of Greece
- Diocese of Germany
- Diocese of Switzerland
- Diocese of France
- Diocese of Great Britain and Ireland

Middle East

- Diocese of Egypt

New World

- Diocese of Canada
- Western Diocese (USA)
- Eastern Diocese (USA)
- Diocese of Australia and New Zealand
- Diocese of Argentina
- Diocese of Uruguay

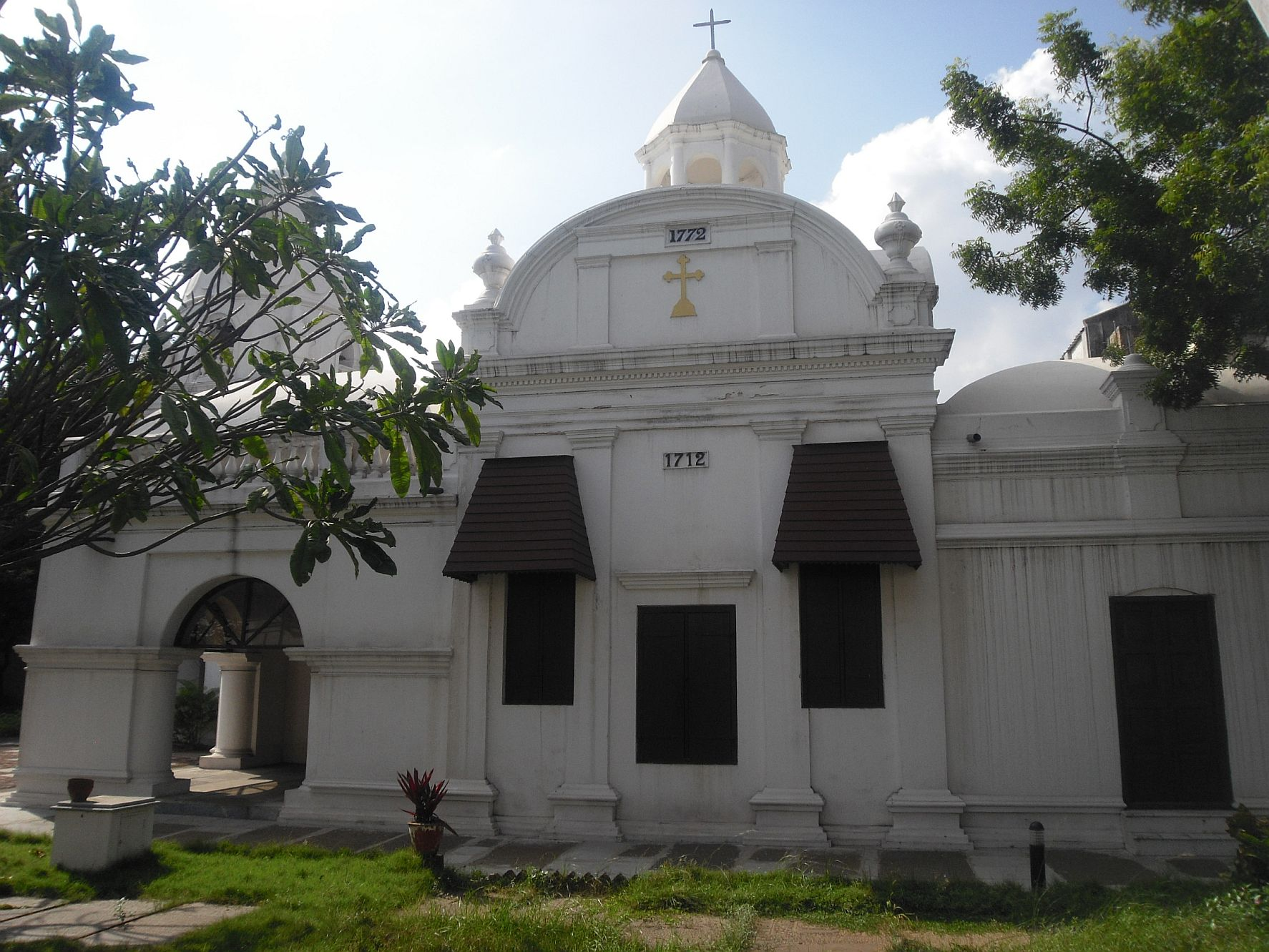
Armenian Church in Madras, India, constructed in 1712

=== Dioceses under the Catholicos of Cilicia ===
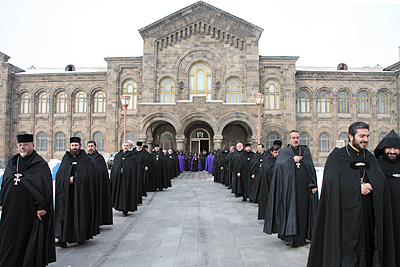
Procession of Armenian priests.

The following are current dioceses of the Catholicosate of Cilicia:

- Armenian Prelacy of Lebanon, based in Beirut
- Armenian Prelacy of Aleppo, based in Aleppo
- Armenian Prelacy of Jezireh, based in Qamishli
- Armenian Prelacy of Isfahan, based in New Julfa
- Armenian Prelacy of Atrpatakan, in Tabriz
- Armenian Prelacy of Tehran, based in Tehran (Saint Sarkis Cathedral)
- Armenian Prelacy of Kuwait & Neighboring Countries, based in Kuwait City
- Armenian Prelacy of the United Arab Emirates and Qatar, based in Abu Dhabi
- Armenian Prelacy of Cyprus, based in Nicosia
- Armenian Prelacy of Greece, based in Athens
- Armenian Prelacy of Canada, based in Montreal
- Armenian Prelacy of the Eastern United States, based in Manhattan, New York
- Armenian Prelacy of the Western United States, based in Sunland-Tujunga, Los Angeles
- Armenian Prelacy of Venezuela, based in Caracas

=== Former dioceses as of 1915 ===
- Armenian Prelacy of Sis, based in Kozan
- Armenian Prelacy of Adana, based in Adana
- Armenian Prelacy of Hadjin, based in Saimbeyli
- Armenian Prelacy of Payas, based in Payas
- Armenian Prelacy of Germanik or Marash, based in Kahramanmaraş
- Armenian Prelacy of Ulnia or Zeytun, based in Süleymanlı
- Armenian Prelacy of Firnouze, based in Fırnız
- Armenian Prelacy of Aintab, based in Gaziantep
- Armenian Prelacy of Antiok, based in Antakya
- Armenian Prelacy of Malatia, based in Malatya
- Armenian Prelacy of Yozghat, based in Yozgat
- Armenian Prelacy of Gyurin, based in Gürün
- Armenian Prelacy of Tevrik, based in Divriği
- Armenian Prelacy of Daranda, based in Darende

=== Military chaplaincy ===
External videos
- Chaplaincy Program in the Armenian Army (Preparations For the Parade)

The Army Chaplaincy Program of the Armenian Church was created to serve the Christian population of Armenia. It is made up of more than 50 clergymen serving as military chaplains to the Armed Forces of Armenia. They organize various religious programs in the military, including delivering lectures and prayers.

== Jurisdiction ==
=== In Armenia ===
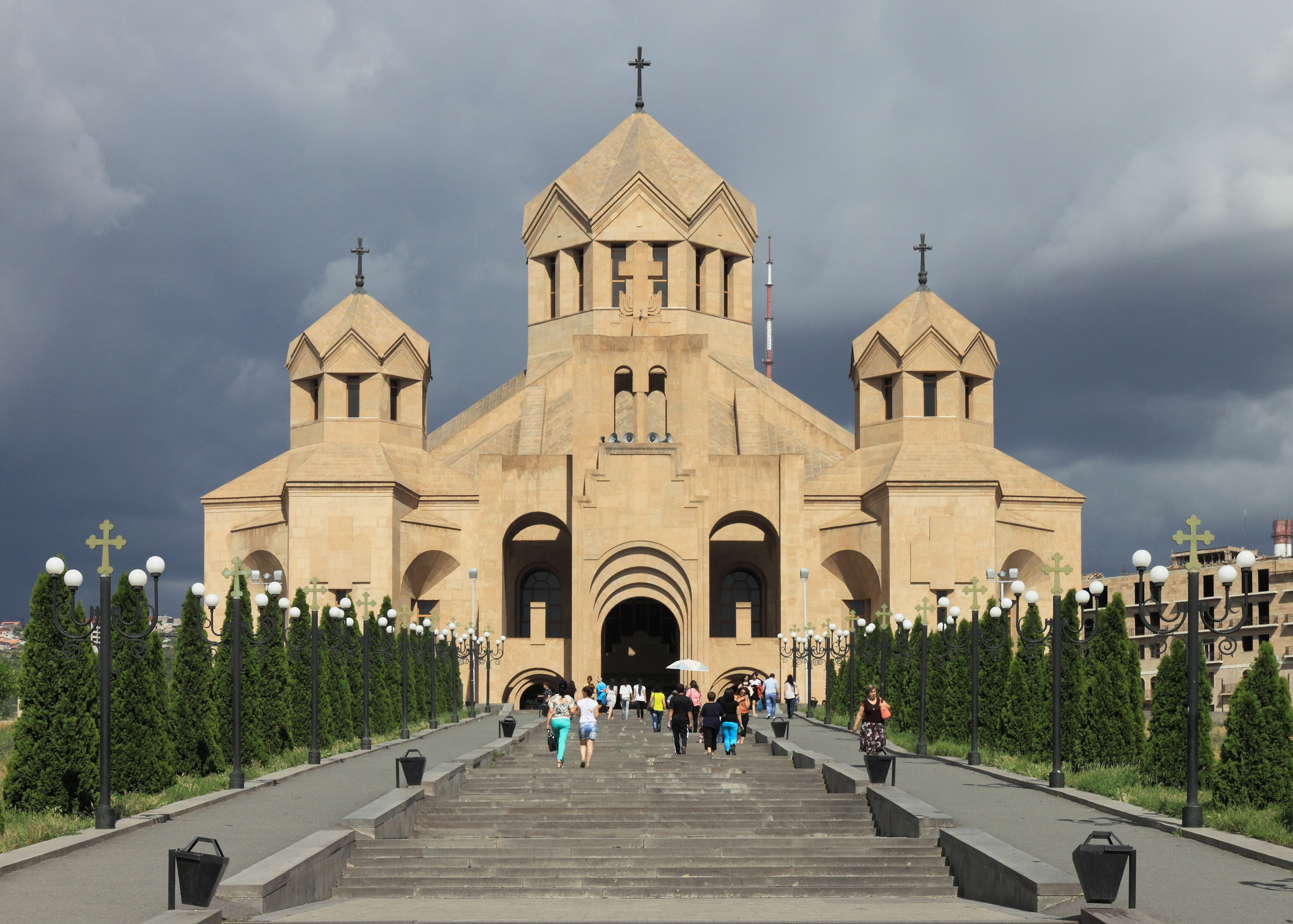
Saint Gregory the Illuminator Cathedral in Yerevan is the largest Armenian Apostolic church in the world

The status of the Armenian Apostolic Church within Armenia is defined in the country's constitution. Article 8.1 of the Constitution of Armenia states: "The Republic of Armenia recognizes the exclusive historical mission of the Armenian Apostolic Holy Church as a national church, in the spiritual life, development of the national culture and preservation of the national identity of the people of Armenia." Among others, ethnographer Hranush Kharatyan has questioned the constitutionality of the phrase "national church".

In 2009, further constitutional amendments were drafted that would make it a crime for non-traditional religious groups to proselytize on adherents of the Armenian Apostolic Church. Minority groups would also be banned from spreading 'distrust' in other faiths. Hrant Bagratyan, former Prime Minister of Armenia, condemned the close association of the Armenian Apostolic Church with the Armenian government, calling the church an "untouchable" organisation that is secretive of its income and expenditure.

The Armenian Apostolic Church is "seen by many as the custodian of Armenian national identity." "Beyond its role as a religious institution, the Apostolic Church has traditionally been seen as the foundational core in the development of the Armenian national identity as God's uniquely chosen people." According to a 2018 survey by the Pew Research Center, in Armenia 82% of respondents say it is very or somewhat important to be a Christian to be truly Armenian. In a 2024 survey in Armenia, 79% of respondents self-identified as belonging to the Armenian Apostolic Church.

According to a 2015 survey 79% of people in Armenia trust it, while 12% neither trust it nor distrust it, and 8% distrust the church.

As both Eastern and Western Armenia came under Persian and Ottoman rule, the Armenian Apostolic Church was the centre of many Armenian liberation activities.

=== In Artsakh ===
After the Bolshevik revolution and the subsequent Soviet occupation of Armenia, all functioning religious institutions in the NKAO were closed down and clergymen often either exiled or shot.

After a while the Armenian Apostolic Church resumed its activities. There were weddings, baptisms, and every Sunday Patarag at a free will attendance basis. The Armenian Apostolic Church since 1989 restored or constructed more than 30 churches worldwide. In 2009 the Republic of Artsakh government introduced a law entitled "Freedom of Conscience and Religious Organisations", article 8 of which provided that only the Armenian Apostolic Church is allowed to preach on the territory of the Republic of Artsakh. However, the law did make processes available for other religious institutions to get approval from the government if they wished to worship within the republic. After the 2023 Azerbaijani offensive, the Armenian population was expelled to Armenia.

=== Armenian diaspora ===
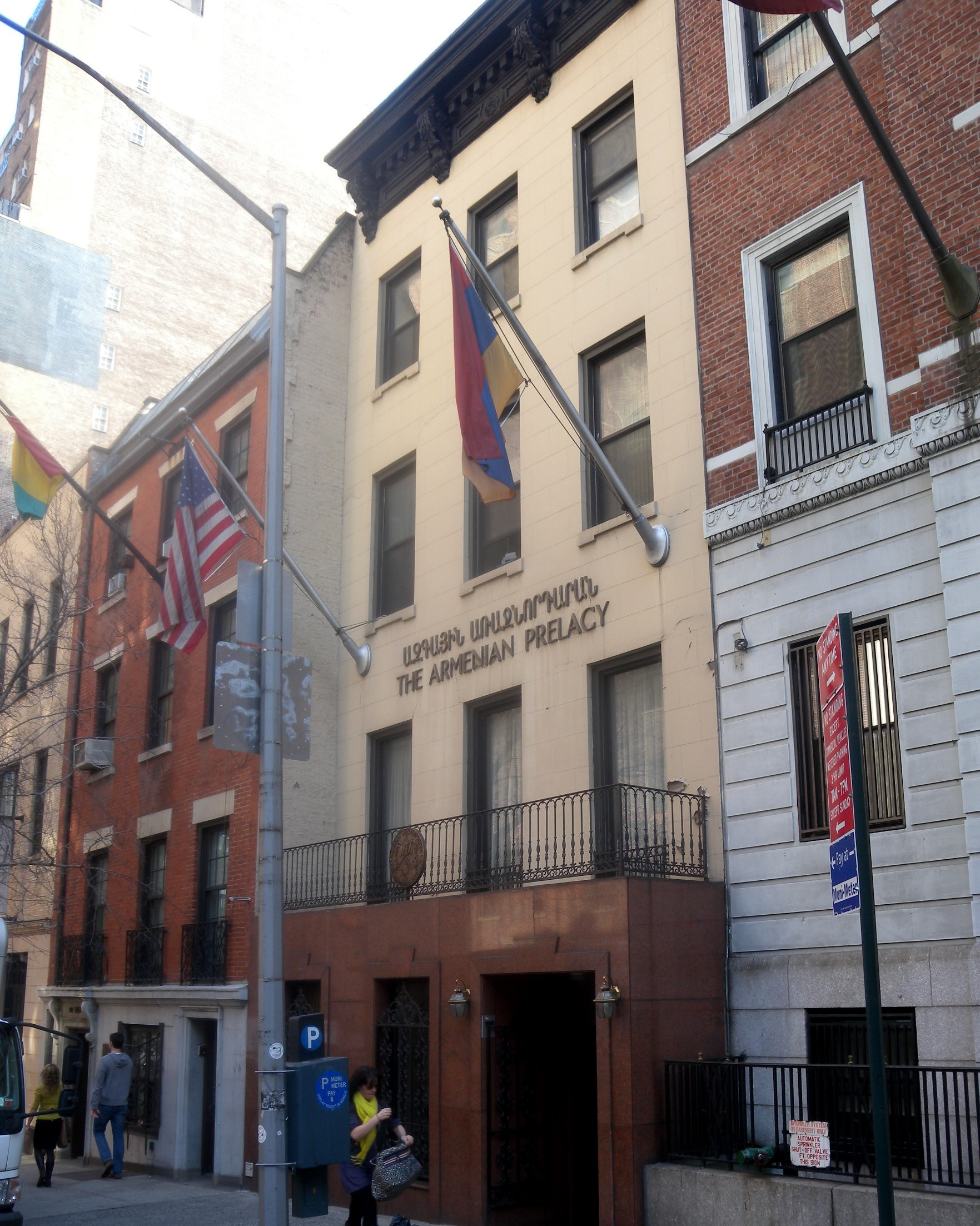
Armenian Apostolic Prelacy, New York

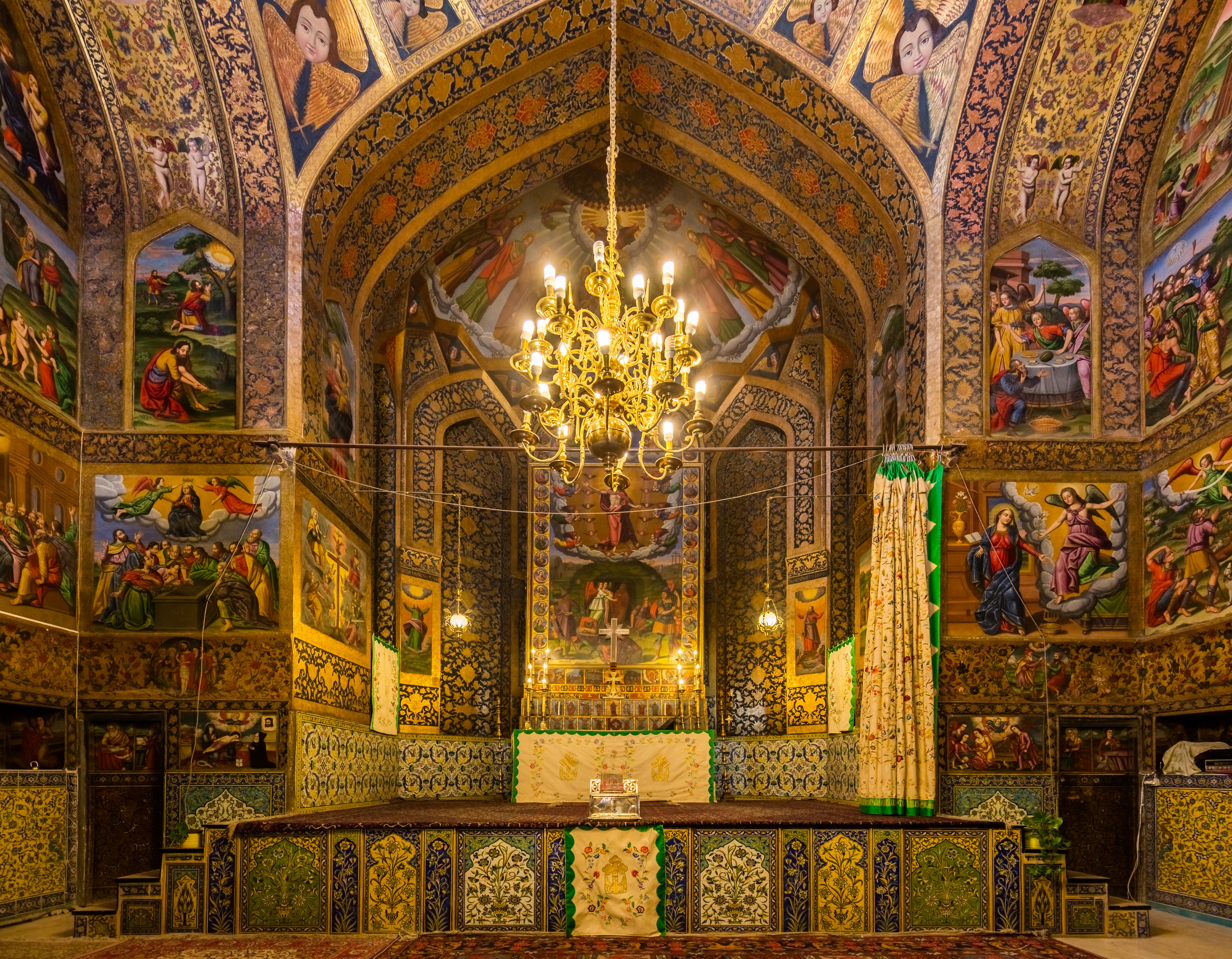
Vank Cathedral, Isfahan

Outside of West Asia, there are notable Armenian Apostolic congregations in various countries. In 2024, the church had 600,000 members in North America and 10,000 members in South America; they also had 25,000 members in Europe.

The Armenian Patriarchate of Constantinople in Turkey and the Armenian Apostolic Church of Iran developed as important communities in the diaspora. These churches grew to represent the largest Christian ethnic minorities in predominantly Muslim countries.

Notably, within the United Kingdom, the Armenian diaspora has grown. The Armenian Apostolic faithful had three prominent Armenian churches as of 2024: St Sarkis in Kensington, London; Saint Yeghiche in South Kensington, London; and Holy Trinity in Manchester.

Ethiopia has had an Armenian church since the 1920s, when groups of Armenians were invited there.

==== United States ====
The mid-20th century saw a growing divide within the Armenian Apostolic Church in the United States. Before the schism, the Armenian Apostoles were largely unified under the jurisdiction of the Mother See of Holy Etchmiadzin, which had established the Armenian Diocese of America in 1898 to serve the growing immigrant community.

The schism was primarily shaped by ideological clashes, since Armenia’s Sovietization in 1920, the Armenian diaspora got polarized between those who chose to affiliate themselves with the Armenian Soviet Socialist Republic (primarily the leftist Hnchak and liberal Ramgavar parties), and those who rejected the Soviet occupation, the latter group consisting mainly of Armenian nationalists from the Armenian Revolutionary Federation (Dashnak).

For the Armenian diaspora, these political divides spilled into intrasectarian conflicts within the Church. One of the key catalysts was the assassination of the Archbishop Leon Tourian on Christmas Eve in 1933. Archbishop Tourian was the Primate of the Eastern Diocese of the Armenian Apostolic Church, headquartered in New York City, and it was under the jurisdiction of the Mother See of Holy Etchmiadzin, which was now located in Soviet Armenia. His assassination was linked to the Dashnak party, which opposed his ties to the Soviet-controlled church. This deepened the divisions within the diaspora, which hardened the sectarian dimensions of the two ecclesiastical headquarters. In the following decades these tensions became institutionalized, and by the late 1950s Armenian Apostolic parishes in the United States had organized into two separate church jurisdictions: the Eastern Diocese, headquartered in New York City, under the jurisdiction of the Mother See of Holy Etchmiadzin, and the Western Diocese, based in Los Angeles, under the jurisdiction of the Holy See of Cilicia. The liturgy of the Churches remains similar, but the division reflects how ideological differences within the diaspora produced sectarian categories within the Church.

== Controversies and criticisms ==
=== Medieval era ===
Early medieval opponents of the Armenian Church in Armenia included the Paulicians (7th–9th centuries) and the Tondrakians (9th–11th centuries).

The power relationship between Catholic and secular rulers was sometimes a source of conflict. In 1037 king Hovhannes-Smbat of Ani deposed and imprisoned Catholicos Petros, who he suspected of holding pro-Byzantine views, and appointed a replacement catholicos. This persecution was highly criticized by the Armenian clergy, forcing Hovhannes-Smbat to release Petros and reinstall him to his former position. In 1038 a major ecclesiastical council was held in Ani, which denied the king the right to elect or remove a catholicos.

=== Contemporary era ===
Surveys of Armenian residents on the church by the IRI
Date	Favorable	Unfavorable	No opinion
2006	76%	22%	2%
2007	81%	17%	2%
2018	67%	26%	6%
2019	71%	23%	6%
2021	92%	2%	6%

Gerard Libaridian said that because Armenians consider the church a national institution, it "must be respected and guarded at all times. Therefore the critical attitude regarding Armenian historical institutions is rarely applied to the Armenian Church, as it is seen as a venerable institution that unites all Armenians." Stepan Danielyan, a scholar on religion, said in 2013 that "When Armenia became independent with the collapse of the Soviet Union, a great deal was expected of the church, but those expectations have not been fulfilled. The church continues to ignore the things most people are worried about – vitally important social, economic and political problems and endless corruption scandals."

In independent Armenia, the Armenian Apostolic Church has often been criticized for its perceived support of the governments of Robert Kocharyan and Serzh Sargsyan despite the formal separation of church and state in Armenia. According to former Prime Minister Hrant Bagratyan religion and state management "have completely gotten mixed up". He described the church as an "untouchable" organization that is secretive of its income and expenditure. Large-scale construction of new churches in the independence period and the negligence of endangered historic churches by the Apostolic church (and the government) have also been criticized.

In recent years, a few high-profile leaders of the church have been involved in controversies. In 2013 Navasard Ktchoyan, the Archbishop of the Araratian Diocese and Prime Minister Tigran Sargsyan were alleged to have been partners with a businessman charged with laundering US$10.7 million bank loan and then depositing most of it in accounts he controlled in Cyprus. In 2011 it was revealed that Ktchoyan drives a Bentley (valued at $180,000–280,000). Pointing out the 34% poverty rate in Armenia, Asbarez editor Ara Khachatourian called it "nothing but blasphemy". He added "Archbishop Kchoyan's reckless disregard and attitude is even more unacceptable due to his position in the Armenian Church."

In October 2013 Father Asoghik Karapetyan, the director of the Museum of the Mother See of Holy Etchmiadzin, stated on television that a non-Apostolic Armenian is not a "true Armenian". A spokesperson for the Armenian Apostolic Church stated that it is his personal view. The statement received considerable criticism, though Asoghik did not retract his statement. In an editorial in the liberal Aravot daily Aram Abrahamyan suggested that religious identity should not be equated with national (ethnic) identity and it is up to every individual to decide whether they are Armenian or not, regardless of religion.

In 2019, the church issued a statement opposing ratification of the Istanbul Convention on Preventing and Combating Violence Against Women and Domestic Violence on the grounds that the convention recognized rights for transgender individuals.

== See also ==
- Armenian calendar (primarily religious in modern times)
- Religion in Armenia
- Armenian Catholic Church
- Armenian church architecture

=== Lists ===
- List of Catholicoi of Armenia
- List of Armenian Catholicoi of Cilicia
- List of Armenian Patriarchs of Constantinople
- List of Armenian Patriarchs of Jerusalem

== Sources ==
- Brock, Sebastian P. (2016). "Miaphysite, not Monophysite!". Cristianesimo Nella Storia. 37 (1): 45–52. ISBN 978-88-15-26168-7.
- Corley, Felix (2025). Catholicos and Commissar: The Armenian Church Under the Soviet Regime. Gomidas Institute. ISBN 978-1-909382-84-8.
- Dočkal, Kamilo (1940a). "Povijest Armenske crkve" [History of the Armenian Church]. Bogoslovska smotra (in Croatian). 28 (2): 113–123.
- Dočkal, Kamilo (1940b). "Povijest Armenske crkve" [History of the Armenian Church]. Bogoslovska smotra (in Croatian). 28 (3): 182–192.
- Fahlbusch, Erwin (1999). "Armenian Apostolic Church". Encyclopedia of Christianity. Vol. 1. Grand Rapids: Wm. B. Eerdmans. pp. 127–128. ISBN 0-8028-2413-7.
- Krikorian, Mesrob K. (2010). Christology of the Oriental Orthodox Churches: Christology in the Tradition of the Armenian Apostolic Church. Peter Lang. ISBN 978-3-631-58121-6.
- Winkler, Dietmar W. (1997). "Miaphysitism: A New Term for Use in the History of Dogma and in Ecumenical Theology". The Harp. 10 (3): 33–40.
- Vrej Nerses Nersessian (2007). "Armenian Christianity" ( (PDF)). In Parry, Ken (ed.). Blackwell Companion to Eastern Christianity. Malden, MA: Blackwell. pp. 23–46. Archived from the original on 13 August 2011.
- Meyendorff, John (1989). Imperial unity and Christian divisions: The Church 450–680 A.D. Crestwood, NY: St. Vladimir's Seminary Press. ISBN 978-0-88141-056-3.
- Ostrogorsky, George (1956). History of the Byzantine State. Oxford: Basil Blackwell.
- Seppälä, Serafim (2021). The Struggle for Memory: The Khachkar Field of Julfa and Other Armenian Sacred Spaces in Azerbaijan, in Review of Ecumenical Studies.
- Stopka, Krzysztof (2016). Armenia Christiana: Armenian Religious Identity and the Churches of Constantinople and Rome (4th–15th century). Kraków: Jagiellonian University Press. ISBN 978-83-233-9555-3.

Armenian religious relations with the Roman Catholic Church

- Pope Benedict XIV, Allatae Sunt (On the observance of Oriental Rites), Encyclical, 1755
- Common Declaration of Pope John Paul II and Catholicos Karekin I, 1996
- Common Declaration of John Paul II and Aram I Keshishian, 1997
- John Paul II to Karekin I, 1999
- Joint Declaration signed by John Paul II and Karekin II, 2000
- Greeting by Pope Benedict XVI to Catholicos Aram I, 2008
- Dialogue and Joint Declarations with the Roman Catholic Church
