= Boh predvichnyi narodyvsia =

Ukrainian Christmas carol

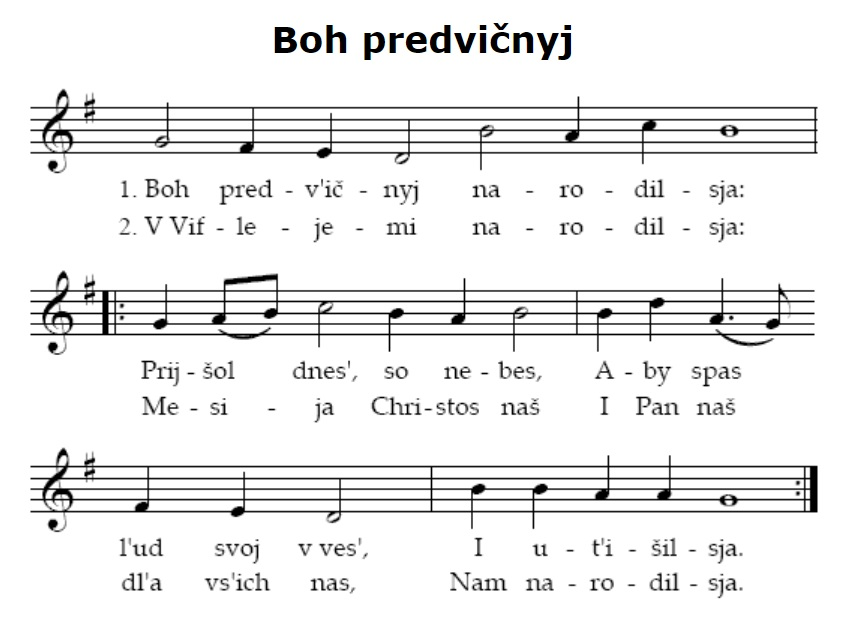
- Melody of the carol with the text in Ukrainian
- Genre: Christmas carol
- Language: Ukrainian
- Melody
- Published: 1790

"Boh predvichnyi narodyvsia" (Ukrainian: «Бог предвічний народився») is a Ukrainian Christmas carol (koliadka), which is translated into English as "Eternal God Was Born" or sometimes "Pre-eternal God Was Born." It focuses on the incarnation in the story of the nativity.

== Background ==
One of the most famous carols in Western Ukraine and the amongst the Ukrainian diaspora, it is customary to sing this carol before the traditional Twelve-dish Christmas Eve supper is served in many parts of the historic region of Galicia. It also sung in churches at the end of the Divine Liturgy from Christmas Day until Candlemas.

"Boh predvichnyi narodyvsia" is in the "Bohohlasnyk" - a Ukrainian anthology of pious songs, which was published in Pochayiv Monastery during the late eighteenth century. The poet Ivan Franko considered this the best of all Ukrainian church songs, calling it "a pearl among carols."

== Lyrics ==
There are multiple versions of this carol, ranging in length from 2 to 10 verses. This version includes 7 verses, and reflects the most common form used in the United States liturgically.

Ukrainian transliteration
Boh predvichnyi narodyvsia,

Pryishov dnes iz nebes, Shchob spasty liud svii ves, I utishyvsia.

V Vyfleiemi narodyvsia, Mesiia, Khrystos nash I pan nash, dlia vsikh nas Nam narodyvsia.

Oznaimyv tse Anhel Bozhyi Napered pastyriam A potim zvizdariam I zemnym zviriam.

Diva Syna iak porodyla Zvizda sta, de Khrysta, Nevista prechysta Syna zrodyla.

"Triie tsari, de idete?" "My idem v Vyfleiem Z zhelaniem spokoiem I povernemsia."

Inshym putem povernuly Zlobnoho, pohantsia Iroda lukavtsia Zovsim mynuly.

"Slava Bohu!" zaspivaimo: Chest Synu Bozhomu I Panu nashomu Poklin viddaimo.

English translation
God eternal is born tonight.

He came down from above To save us with his love And he rejoiced.

He was born in Bethlehem, Our Christ, Our Messiah, The Lord of creation was born here for us.

The tidings came through an angel, Shepherds knew, then the Kings The watchers of the skies Then all creation.

When Christ was born of the Virgin, A star stood where the Son, And Mother, the most pure, Were sheltered that night.

"You three wise men, whither go you?" "We go to Bethlehem, Bearing peaceful greetings, We shall then return."

Returning through, a new way they chose, The malicious Herod, The evil wicked one, They wished to avoid.

Ring out the song: "Glory to God!" Honor to the son of God, Honor to our Lord, And homage to him.

Analyzing the text of carol, Mikhailo Voznyak points out that line about the wise men returning by a different route is probably a later insertion; it is not in the original text, which has been preserved from the eighteenth century. He also attributes its popularity with the peasant culture of eighteenth and nineteenth century Ukraine to its egalitarian message conveyed by the placing of shepherds before the kings and conveying the message that the even the poorest and most wretched, like Jesus himself, find equality or even glory in the Christmas story.

== See also ==
- List of Christmas carols
