= Diocese of Gegharkounik =

Diocese of Gegharkounik Գեղարքունիքի թեմ
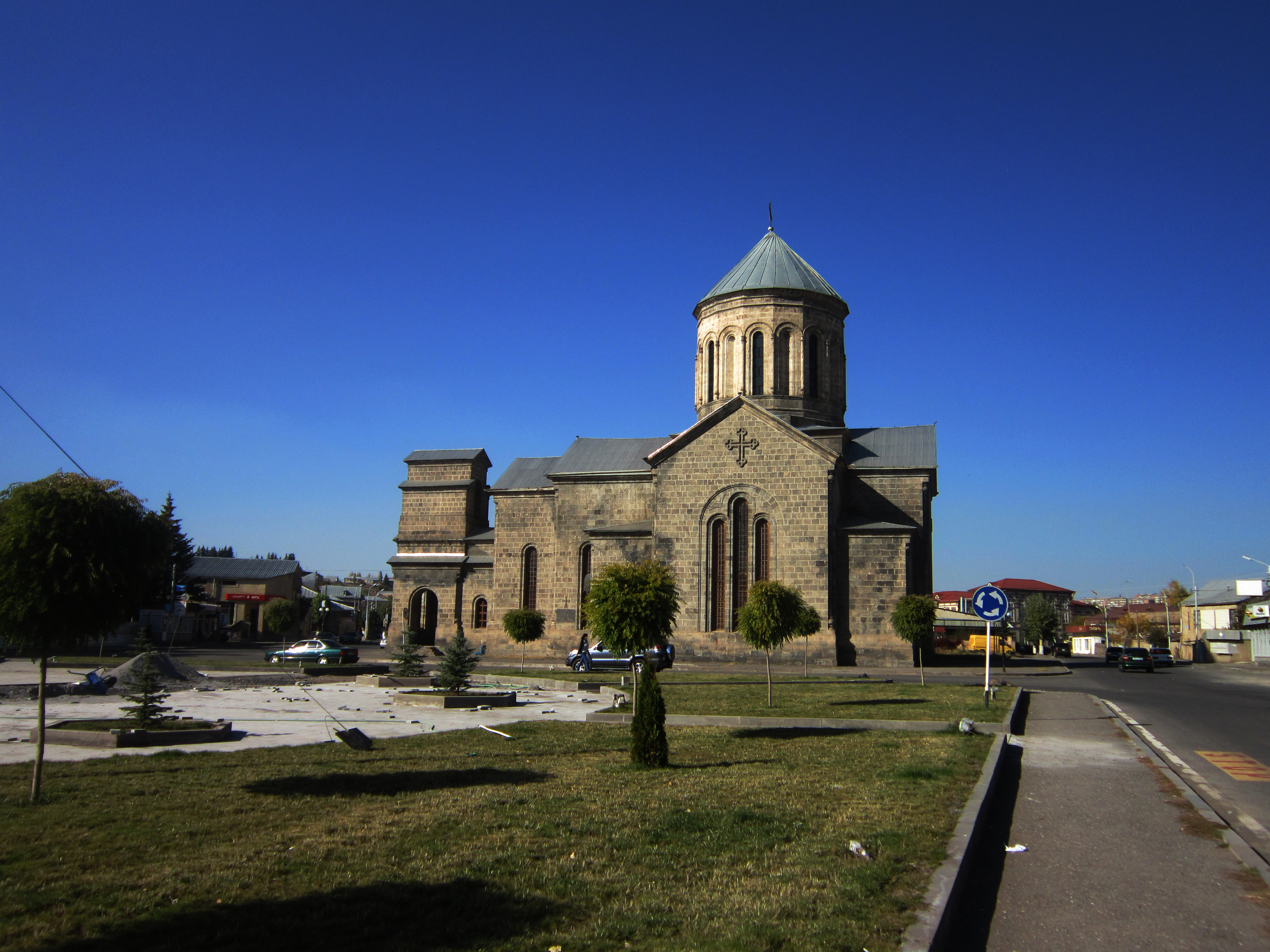
- Holy Mother of God Cathedral, Gavar

Location
- Country: Armenia

Statistics
- Population: Total: (as of 2011); ~235,000

Information
- Denomination: Armenian Apostolic Church
- Rite: Armenian Rite
- Established: 1996
- Cathedral: Holy Mother of God Cathedral, Gavar

Current leadership
- Patriarch: Karekin II
- Primate: Bishop Markos Hovhannisyan

Diocese of Gegharkounik (Armenian: Գեղարքունիքի թեմ Gegharkuniki t'em), is a diocese of the Armenian Apostolic Church covering the Gegharkunik Province of Armenia. The name is derived from the historic Gegharkunik canton of Syunik (historic province) province of ancient Greater Armenia.

The Diocese of Gegharkounik was officially founded on 30 May 1996, upon a kontakion issued by Catholicos Karekin I. The diocesan headquarters are located in the provincial capital Gavar, with the seat being the Holy Mother of God Cathedral of the town.
