= Armenian Diocese of Russia and New Nakhichevan =

Mother See of Holy Etchmiadzin

Diocese of Russia and New Nakhichevan Ռուսաստանի և Նոր Նախիջևանի հայոց թեմ Российская и Ново-Нахичеванская епархия
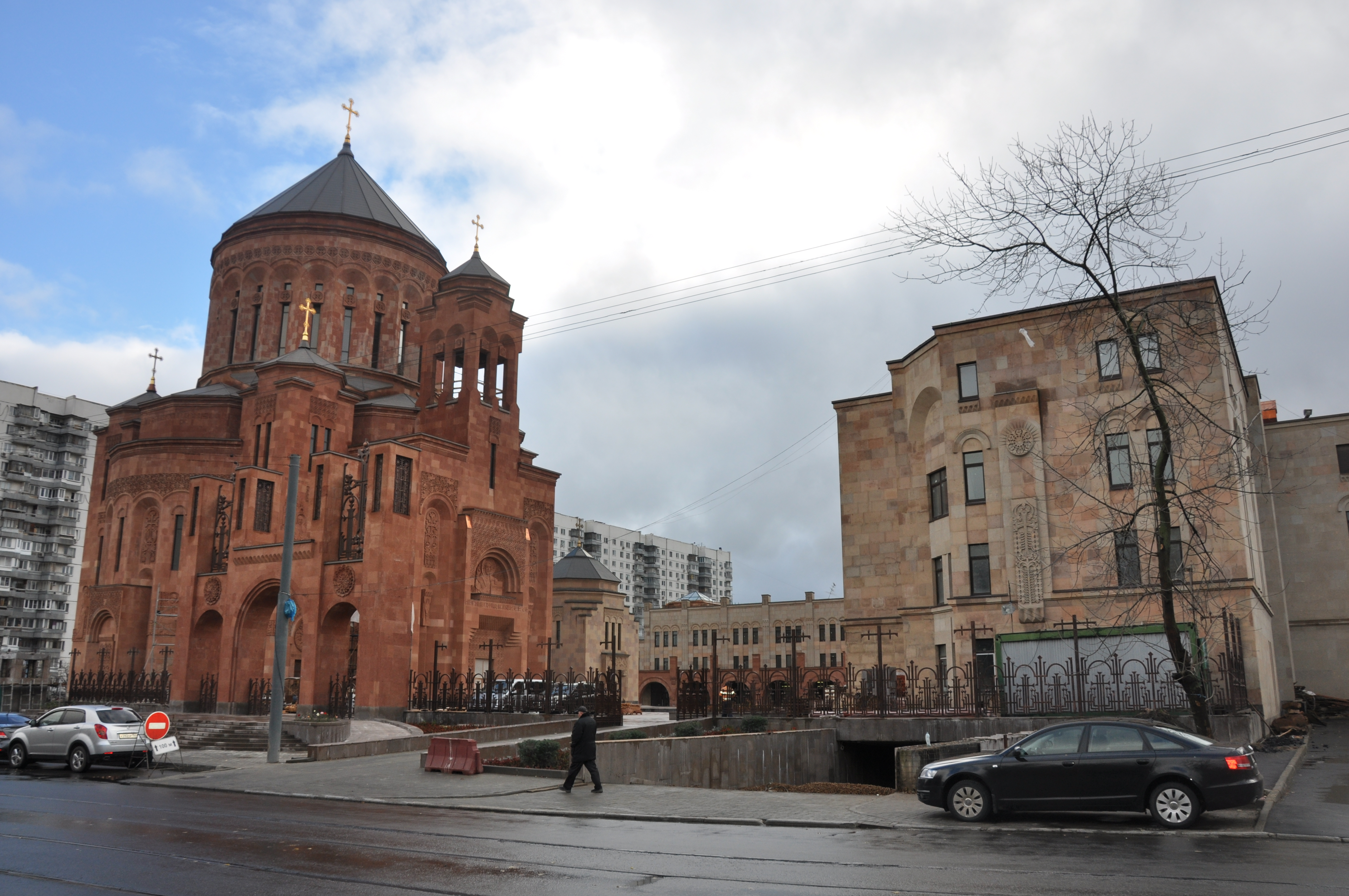
- Armenian Cathedral of Moscow, Russia

Location
- Country: Russia
- Territory: Russia, Belarus, Kazakhstan, Kyrgyzstan, Moldova, Tajikistan, Turkmenistan, Uzbekistan

Statistics
- Churches: 80
- Congregations: 3,000,000 (three million)

Information
- Denomination: Armenian Apostolic Church
- Rite: Armenian Rite
- Established: 1966
- Cathedral: Armenian Cathedral of Moscow, Russia

Current leadership
- Patriarch: Karekin II
- Bishop: Patriarchal Exarch in Russia Archbishop Ezras (Nersisyan)

Website
- https://armenianchurch.ru/

The Diocese of Russia and New Nakhichevan (Armenian: Հայաստանեայց Առաքելական Եկեղեցու Ռուսաստանի և Նոր Նախիջևանի Հայոց Թեմ; Russian: Российская и Ново-Нахичеванская епархия) is one of the historical dioceses of the Armenian Apostolic Church, whose jurisdiction includes most of Russia, as well as the territory of Belarus, Kazakhstan, Kyrgyzstan, Moldova, Tajikistan, Turkmenistan, and Uzbekistan. The head of the Diocese of Russia and New Nakhichevan, the patriarchal exarch in Russia is Archbishop Ezras (Nersisyan).

== History ==
With the advent of Soviet power, all churches were closed, and most of the clergy were arrested. Only in the 1950s did clergy begin to visit Armenian villages in the Rostov region, and in 1955 the church in Moscow was reopened. But the churches in the USSR really began to strengthen in the late 1970s, when the political situation in the country changed and Tiran (Kyuregyan) was appointed head of the diocese in 1976.

During Soviet times, the diocese included the entire territory of the USSR outside of Transcaucasia. In the 1990s, the Diocese of Southern Russia and the Ukrainian Diocese separated from the diocese. In 2020, the Diocese of the Baltic States was separated.

== Structure ==
In Russia, the Armenian Apostolic Church is represented by the Diocese of Russia and New Nakhichevan, the center of which is Moscow. The diocese includes about 40 communities, 27 of which are located on the territory of the Russian Federation. The head of the diocese is the Patriarchal Exarch, who is currently Bishop Yezras Nersisyan. Under him, there is a Diocesan Council, which, in addition to Church figures, includes prominent Armenians of Russia.

The Diocese of Russia and New Nakhichevan includes two vicariates: Rostov and Western.

=== Rostov Vicariate ===
The Rostov Vicariate of the Armenian Apostolic Church unites communities of Rostov-on-Don, Astrakhan, Volgograd, Saratov, most of which also do not have churches. Thus, of the 7 Armenian churches of Rostov-on-Don, only one cemetery church and the building of the Surp Khach Monastery have survived, which houses the Museum of Russian-Armenian Friendship, where festive services are currently held. Of great value to the Armenian Apostolic Church are the churches in the Armenian villages of the Myasnikovsky District of the Rostov Region, built in the sixties of the 19th century. Of these, only one church has survived in good condition, and all the others need serious repair and restoration work.

=== Western Vicariate ===
The Western Vicariate of the Armenian Apostolic Church includes the church communities of Moscow and Saint Petersburg. By now, the Armenian churches in Saint Petersburg have already been returned to the parishioners. In Moscow, two of the three Armenian churches were destroyed during the Soviet period. Currently, the Church of the Holy Resurrection at the Armenian Cemetery and since 2013, the Armenian Cathedral on Trifonovskaya Street are operating in Moscow.

== Diocese names ==
- Bessarabian Diocese (1809–1830)
- Bessarabian and New Nakhichevan (1830–1895)
- New Nakhichevan and Bessarabian Diocese (1895–1918)
- New Nakhichevan (1918–1956)
- Diocese of New Nakhichevan and the North Caucasus (1956–1966)
- New Nakhichevan and Russian Diocese (1966–2013)
- Russian and New Nakhichevan Diocese (since 2013)

== Primates ==
- 1809-1828 - Grigor (Zakaryan)
- 1828-1843 - Nerses V
- 1843-1857 - Matevos
- 1857-1865 - Gabriel Aivazovsky
- 1865-1879 - Gevorg
- 1879-1885 - Makar (Ter-Petrosyan)
- 1887-1896 - (Saganyants)
- 1897-1918 - Nerses (Khudoverdyan)
- 1925-1930 - Garegin (Hovsepyan)
- 1956-1963 - Garegin (Ter-Hakopyan)
- 1963 - April 1976 - Pargev (Gevorgyan)
- April 2, 1976 - October 5, 2000 - Tiran (Kyureghyan)
- Since October 5, 2000 — Ezras (Nersisyan)

== See also ==
- List of Armenian churches in Russia
