= Vrtanes =

Vrtanes is an Armenian given name (in Armenian Վրթանես). It may refer to:

- St. Vrtanes I, Catholicos in the Armenia's Holy Apostolic Church
- Vrtanes Abrahamyan (born 1962), Armenian bishop
- Vrtanes, Locum Tenens for 4 years of Armenian Patriarchate of Jerusalem after death of Patriarch Hovhannes of Smyrna in 1860 and the election of his successor Esayee of Talas in 1864
- Vrtanes Papazian (1866–1920), Armenian writer, public-political and cultural activist, literary critic, editor, literature historian, teacher and translator.
