= Serafim Seppälä =

Serafim Seppälä (born 1970) is a Finnish academic researcher, writer, and Orthodox Church of Finland archimandrite. He has served as a professor of systematic theology and patristics at the University of Eastern Finland since 2007. His scientific board memberships include Finnish Institute in the Middle East (2003–2023) and The Finnish Patristic Society since 2012.

Some of his research interests include the encounter between Christianity and Islam in the Middle East, Syriac mystical theology, Early Byzantine ascetic literature, Mariology, Armenian culture, and non-dogmatic patristic topics, such as angelology, animals, and aesthetics.

== Selected bibliography ==
- Paratiisi on idässä : Lähi-idän kristittyjen ja syyrialaisen kirjallisuuden historiaa sekä kokoelma syyrialaisten isien opetuksia (1999)
- Kerubin silmin : Luostareissa, luolissa, erämaissa ja pylväillä kilvoitelleiden syyrialaisten askeettien historiaa (2002)
- Vapaus (2007)
- Araratista itään : Kauneuden ja kärsimyksen Armenia (2007)
- Kultainen Jerusalem : Pyhän kaupungin idea juutalaisuudessa, kristinuskossa ja islamissa (2008)
- Elämän äiti : Neitsyt Maria varhaiskristillisessä ajattelussa (2010)
- Kauneus : Jumalan kieli (2010)
- Armenian kansanmurhan perintö (2011)
- Naiseus : Varhaiskristillisiä ja juutalaisia näkökulmia (2013)
- Ikonien filosofia (2014)
- Vaienneita ääniä : Kunnianosoitus kadonneelle kulttuurille (2015)
- Taivaalliset voimat : Enkelit juutalaisuudessa ja varhaiskristillisyydessä (2016)
- Elämän puu : Pyhä risti idän kirkossa (2020)
- Antiikista Bysanttiin (2021)
- Ikuinen Betlehem : Efraim Syyrialaisen hymnejä Kristuksen syntymästä (2022)
