= Twelve-dish Christmas Eve supper =

Traditional meal in some European cultures

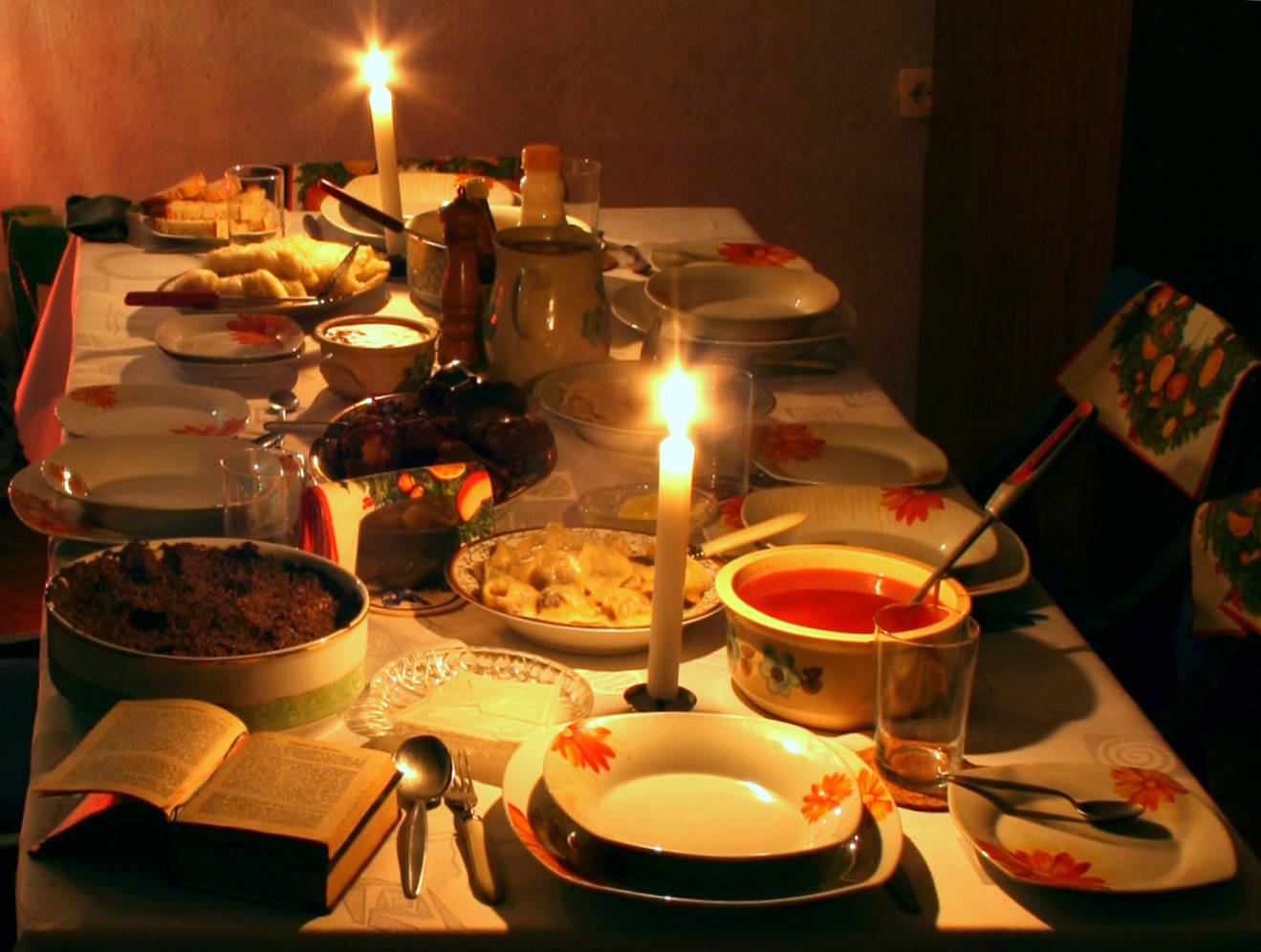
Traditional Polish Wigilia meal.

Traditional Christmas Eve supper in Lithuania.

A twelve-dish Christmas Eve supper is traditionally prepared to commemorate the twelve disciples of Jesus in the Central-Eastern European cultures that historically made up the Polish–Lithuanian Commonwealth, chiefly in Poland and Lithuania, but to a lesser extent also in Belarus and Ukraine.

== Description ==
The specific dishes may differ from country to country, but many of them are universal. Due to the Nativity Fast, no meat, eggs or milk (including cheese) are allowed during the supper. Thus fish, mushrooms and various types of grain are the main offerings. In the Orthodox countries of Belarus and Ukraine, the twelve Holy Supper dishes tend to range from bitter to sweet.

In Poland, the Wigilia supper begins with eating soups, traditionally mushroom soup or barszcz. The ritual for Catholics and Orthodox Christians in Ukraine is to start with kutia. Kutia, poppy milk (aguonų pienas) together with kūčiukai are served as a dessert and forms a significant part of the Lithuanian Christmas Eve menu. Poppy seeds are widely used for Christmas Eve dishes, because they symbolise abundance and prosperity. In Poland, it was traditionally believed that the poppy seeds, known for their sleep-inducing power, may have been helpful on the way to the afterlife or as a delicacy for souls who come to earth. Honey a product produced by bees, which are considered by many to be sacred creatures, was offered as a gift to departed souls. In Ukraine, it was believed that varenyky, which are also a symbol of prosperity, with poppy-seed filling when served at Ukrainian Sviata Vecheria have the magical potential for bringing prosperity and fecundity to the villager.

Regarding the fish dishes, these are usually herring, carp or pike. In Lithuania, herring (Lithuanian: silkė) dishes are popular and diverse. Usually silkė su morkomis (herring with carrots), or silkė su grybais (herring with mushrooms) are served on Christmas Eve.

Mushrooms, especially dried or pickled, are also one of the main ingredients used in Christmas Eve dishes. Sauerkraut (Polish: kiszona kapusta, Ukrainian: кисла капуста; kysla kapusta) with wild mushrooms or peas, red borscht, mushroom or fish soups are served in Poland and western Ukraine.

Boiled or deep fried dumplings (Polish: pierogi, Ukrainian: вареники, varenyky, Lithuanian: auselės) with a wide variety of fillings (including cabbage or sauerkraut, mushrooms and crushed poppy seeds), are among the most popular dishes. Doughnuts filled with jam (Polish: pączki, Ukrainian: пампушки, pampushky) are served for dessert in Poland, western Belarus, western Ukraine, but in Lithuania sweet dishes are not common, as they are believed to be inappropriate for the solemn atmosphere of the evening.

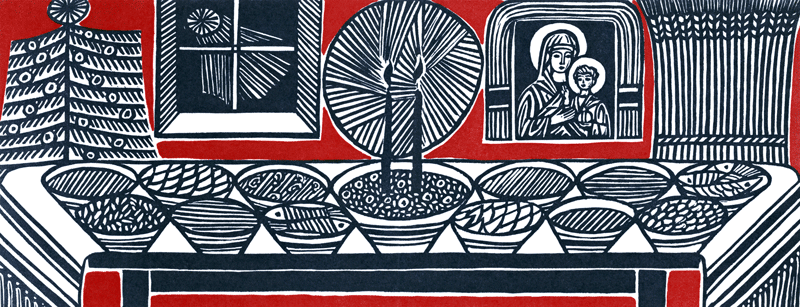
Traditional Ukrainian Sviata vecheria meal. Jacques Hnizdovsky Christmas card.

As for beverages, traditionally dried fruit kompot or cranberry kisiel (Lithuanian: spanguolių kisielius) are common. In earlier times oaten kisiel was more common.

There is the whole ritual before the meal begins. Once the first star appears on the sky, each member of the family washes his face, hands and legs in cold water saying: "Be as healthy as this water is." The most brave people go to local rivers or lakes and have a short swim there. After the water procedure is finished, the family goes on with a prayer, often the Our Father. After the prayer the head of the household will anoint each person present with honey, making the sign of the Cross on their forehead, saying: "In the name of the Father and of the Son and of the Holy Spirit: may you have sweetness and many good things in life and in the new year."

The Christmas Eve supper is usually held under candlelight and starts in the evening after the first star appears in the sky. The star symbolizes the birth of Jesus in Christian tradition and a soul of deceased ancestors in pre-Christian beliefs. Quiet, dim-lighting, and a somewhat mystical atmosphere is characteristic for Christmas Eve supper.

In Poland, Lithuania, Belarus, and western Ukraine an extra plate and seat are always left at the table. According to the folk beliefs, the spirits of the departed members of the family visit on the night.

== See also ==
- Feast of the Seven Fishes, a similar Christmas Eve meal in Italian American culture
