= Armenian Diocese of Ukraine =

Armenian Diocese of Ukraine Ուկրաինայի հայոց թեմ
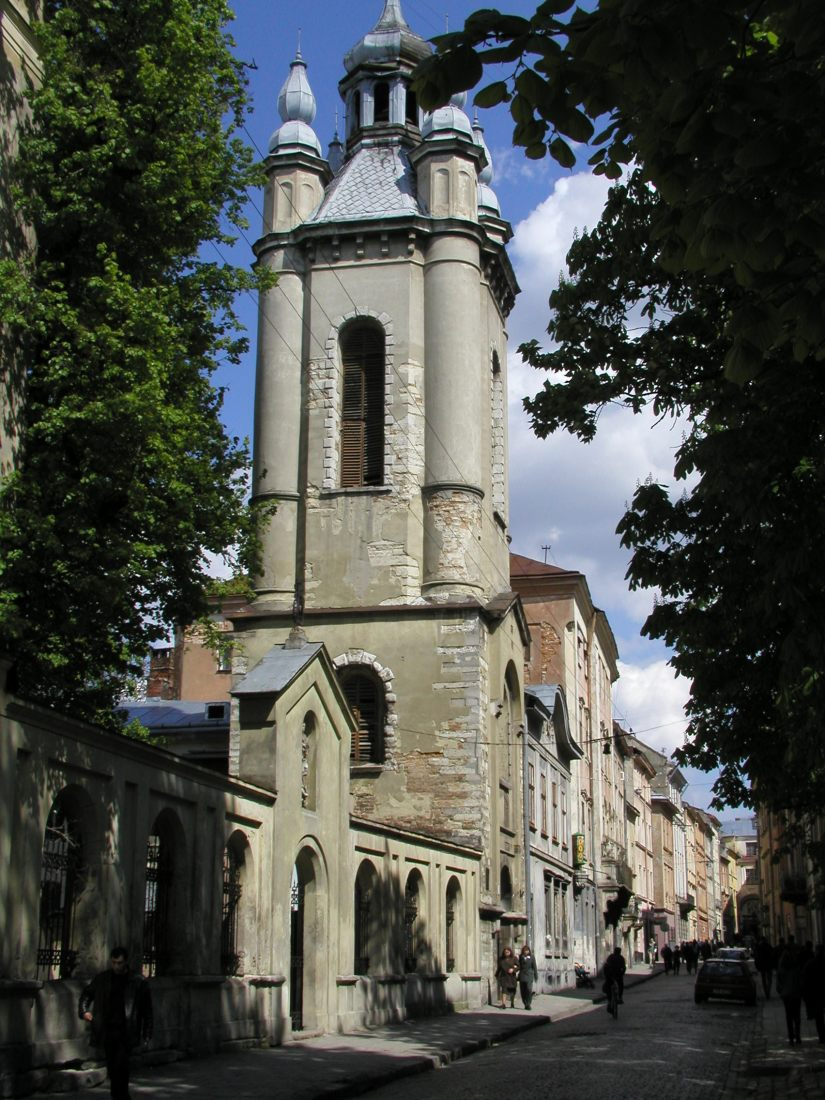
- Armenian Cathedral of Lviv

Location
- Country: Ukraine

Information
- Denomination: Armenian Apostolic Church
- Rite: Armenian Rite
- Established: 1997
- Cathedral: Armenian Cathedral of Lviv, Lviv

Current leadership
- Patriarch: Karekin II
- Pontifical vicar: Bishop Markos Hovhannisyan

The Armenian Diocese of Ukraine (Armenian: Ուկրաինայի հայոց թեմ Ukrainayi Hayots Tem) is a diocese of the Armenian Apostolic Church covering Ukraine. The diocese was officially founded on 13 January 1997, by Catholicos Karekin I. The diocesan headquarters are located in Lviv and its main cathedral is the Armenian Cathedral of Lviv.

== History ==
The first religious communities of Armenians were established in Crimea in the 8th century, when the territory was under Byzantine control. In Lviv, the Armenian community was established in the 12th century, when the Church of the Virgin Mary and Saint was consecrated. After the Armenian Church on the territory of Ukraine ceased to exist in the 1920-1930s and all existing churches were closed, the diocese also ceased its activities and existence.

In October 1991, Catholicos Vazgen I tasked Nathan Hovhannisian with the mission of organizing the diocese of the Armenian Apostolic Church and appointed him locum tenens in Ukraine. In 1997, Karekin I consecrated Hovhannisian as a bishop. The Ukrainian diocese was established on 13 January 1997 by separating its territory from the Diocese of Russia and New Nakhichevan.

With the organization of the diocese, efforts began to build new temples and acquire old Armenian temples. The small Armenian Catholic community in Lviv (20-30 people), registered in 1991, was unable to take over the local cathedral, which was handed over to the Armenian Apostolic Church in 2000–2003.

The diocese has its representative within the All-Ukrainian Council of Churches and Religious Organizations.

== Primates ==
- Nathan Hovhannisian (1997–2000)
- Grigori Buniatian (2001–2015)
- Markos Hovhannisyan (2015–present)

== See also ==
- Armenians in Ukraine
