= Fedir Vovk =

Ukrainian anthropologist–archaeologist

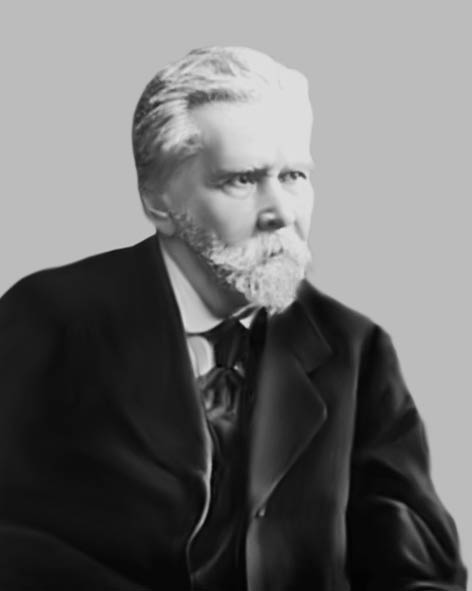
Fedir Vovk

Fedir Kindratovych Vovk (Ukrainian: Федір Кіндратович Вовк, 5 March 1847 – 29 June 1918) also known as Khvedir Vovk (Ukrainian: Хведір Вовк) was a Ukrainian anthropologist-archaeologist, who worked as the curator of the Alexander III Museum in St. Petersburg.

Vovk graduated from Kyiv University in 1871. He was an active member of the Kyiv Hromada. From 1887 to 1905 he lived in Paris to escape tsarist persecution. During the 1890s Vovk lectured at the Paris Anthropological Society and the Sorbonne, being accepted by the latter establishment through the protection of his compatriot Élie Metchnikoff. He earned a Ph.D. in 1900, and won the Godard Prize for his dissertation. Thanks to Vovk's intervantion, in 1903 Ukrainian historian Mykhailo Hrushevsky was allowed to deliver a course of lectures at the Sorbonne University. In 1905 he returned to Russia, where, along with his position at the Alexander III Museum, he held a lecturership at Saint Petersburg University. He was granted a professorship at Kiev University in 1917 but died before he could take it up.

Vovk's research concerned the anthropological study of the Ukrainian people; in it he argued that the Ukrainians constituted a separate group of Slavs most closely related to the Southern Slavs (Dinaric race).

== Notable works ==
- Rites et usages nuptiaux en Ukraine ("Wedding Rites and Traditions in Ukraine", 1891);
- La fraternisation en Ukraine ("Fraternization in Ukraine", 1892);
- Le traîneau dans les rites funéraires de l’Ukraine ("Sledge in the Funeral Rites of Ukraine", 1895);
- Découvertes préhistoriques de M. Chvoïka à Kiev ("Prehistoric Discoveries of Vikentiy Khvoyka in Kyiv", 1899).
