= Didukh =

Ukrainian Christmas decoration

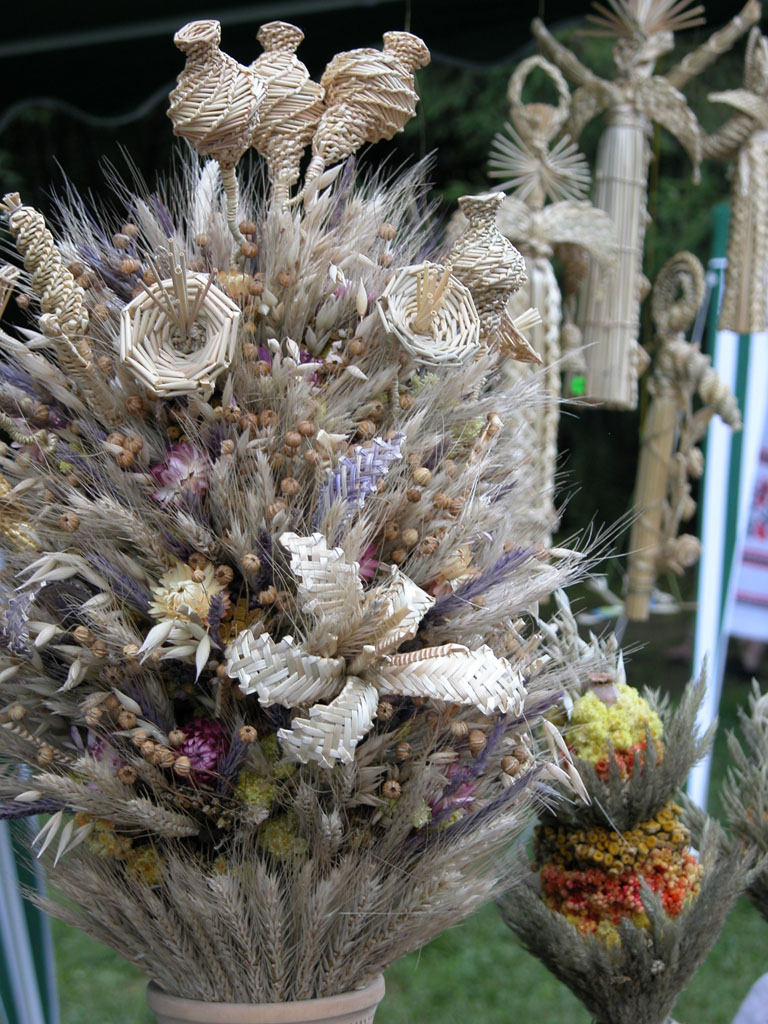
Didukh

A didukh (Ukrainian: дідух [d⁽ʲ⁾iˈdux]), is a Ukrainian and Polish Christmas decoration; made from a sheaf of wheat, it is a symbolic sacrifice taken from the autumn harvest. "Didukh" literally means "grandfather spirit". Didukhy are traditionally made from the first or the last stalks of wheat reaped during the year. They symbolize the household's wish for an abundance of nature and a bountiful harvest for the upcoming year. Before the holidays, wheat ears or stalks are gathered with colorful threads, then the bunches are tied with ribbons. A didukh is placed in most Ukrainian homes before Christmas, and kept until Masnytsia.

== Spiritual meaning ==
It is believed that the spirits of the household's ancestors reside in didukh during the holidays. While it is at a place of honor inside the house, the souls of all ancestors will unite and bless the family. On Sviat Vechir (Christmas Eve), the didukh is brought into the house by the hospodar (head of the household). It is placed in the pokutia (corner with icons) of the house, along with the kutia (ritual food) and uzvar (ritual drink). On Masnytsia, didukh is burnt symbolizing the end of the winter.

== See also ==
- Christmas decoration
