= Vertep =

Ukrainian portable puppet theatre and drama

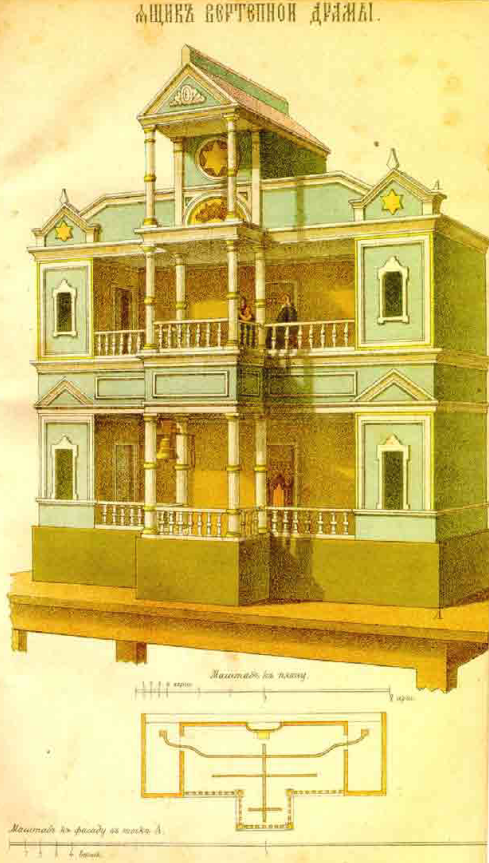
Drawing of a Ukrainian vertep box from Sokyryntsi, 18th century

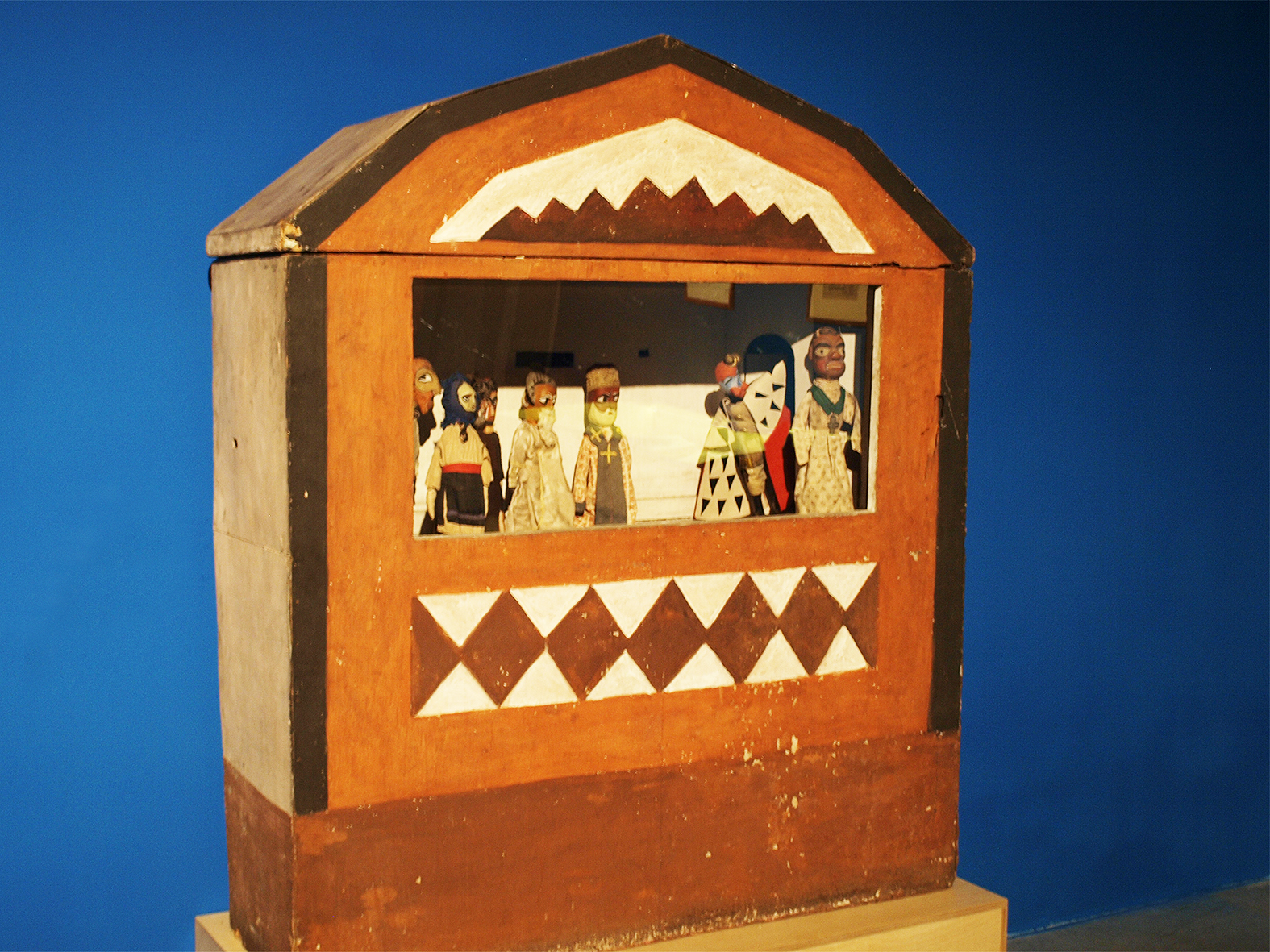
Mezhyhirya vertep, 1923

In Ukrainian culture, vertep (вертеп, pronounced [ʋerˈtɛp], from Church Slavonic: вєртє́пъ [ʋerˈtep], lit. 'cave') is a portable puppet theatre and drama, which presents the nativity scene, other mystery plays, as well as secular plots with satirical and comical elements. The original meaning of the word is "secret place", "cave", "den", referring to the cave where Christ was born, i.e., the Bethlehem Cave. Vertep first appeared in the second half of the 16th century under the influence of Western European traditions, which spread to Ukrainian lands, then part of the Polish–Lithuanian Commonwealth. It developed from the traditions of school drama and is related to the Polish szopka, Belarusian batlejka and Western European marionette theatre. Vertep reached the peak of its popularity in the Ukrainian Cossack Hetmanate, which would eventually become a protectorate of the Russian Empire.

== History ==
The Ukrainian vertep, or puppet theatre, developed in the latter half of the 16th century – beginning of the 17th century and was an adoption of popular Western European mystery plays. The first documented mention of vertep comes from 1573, and the genre reached its peak of prominence during the second half of the 18th century. It is believed to have been introduced by students of the Kyiv-Mohyla Academy. The vertep puppet theatre was made familiar to Ukrainian rural communities by wandering deacons and students of the above-mentioned Academy, whose role could be compared to medieval goliards. The theatre had numerous regional variants, the most notable being created in Sokyryntsi, Baturyn and Mezhyhirya.

With time, production of verteps was adopted by urban and rural inhabitants and became a part of Ukrainian popular culture. Among others, a song from traditional vertep performance was included into the play Natalka Poltavka by Ivan Kotliarevsky. The traditions of "live" vertep first performed in 1918 by actors of Les Kurbas' Young Theatre were revived during the 1990s.

After the Russian Revolution of 1917, the atheistic Soviet state severely persecuted religion and the associated elements of culture, and by 1930s the tradition of Christmas verteps was virtually eliminated, except in the lands of Western Ukraine. Between 1923 and 1929 a secularized vertep was created at the Mezhyhiria technical school near Kyiv, performing antireligious and political plays. Mezhyhiria vertep replaced the traditional figures with puppets of a Red Army soldier, Tsar Nicholas II, Kaiser Wilhelm II, Emperor Franz Joseph, representatives of the Entente, the Pope, a Catholic priest etc. During the 1930s the vertep was active in Kharkiv, where it was operated by the Association of Revolutionary Arts of Ukraine. Elements of vertep tradition were adopted by a number of puppet theatres in Soviet Ukraine, and composers such as Mykhailo Verykivsky and Vitaliy Kyreiko used fragments of vertep drama in their operas.

Starting from the late 1980s, the vertep tradition saw a gradual revival, with first urban vertep performances taking place in Lviv. In 1989 a vertep festival was organized for the first time at the International Centre of Culture and Arts in Kyiv, and in 1995 a Christmas vertep contest and an accompanying scientific conference took place in Lutsk. In 2003 and 2006 vertep festivals were hosted by the National Opera of Ukraine, with the second performance involving young performers from the American diaspora.

== Composition ==
A typical vertep was a two-storeyed wooden box. The floors had slots through which the puppeteers controlled wooden puppets with the use of wires. The performance was divided into two separate sections: sacred and secular, with the former taking the form of a tragedy, and the latter – a comedy. The upper floor of the two-storeyed box was used for the nativity scene, while the lower was for interludes and other mystery plays (most often featuring the Herod and Rachel plots) and secular plays, often of comedy character.

The sacred act was based on the Nativity scene with interludes, while the secular was based on day-to-day life and introduced comical figures from popular folk culture, such as the Old Man (Did) and Old Woman (Baba), Uniate Priest (Pip), Dyak, heroes of Malanka plays, stereotypical representatives of different ethnicities (Zaporozhian Cossack, Russian soldier and his girl, Poles, Hungarian hussars, Gypsies, Jews (Zhyd) etc.) Some verteps told of the destruction of the Zaporozhian Sich. Unlike real-life and allegorical personalities, religious figures such as Jesus Christ and Virgin Mary were never included in vertep performances.

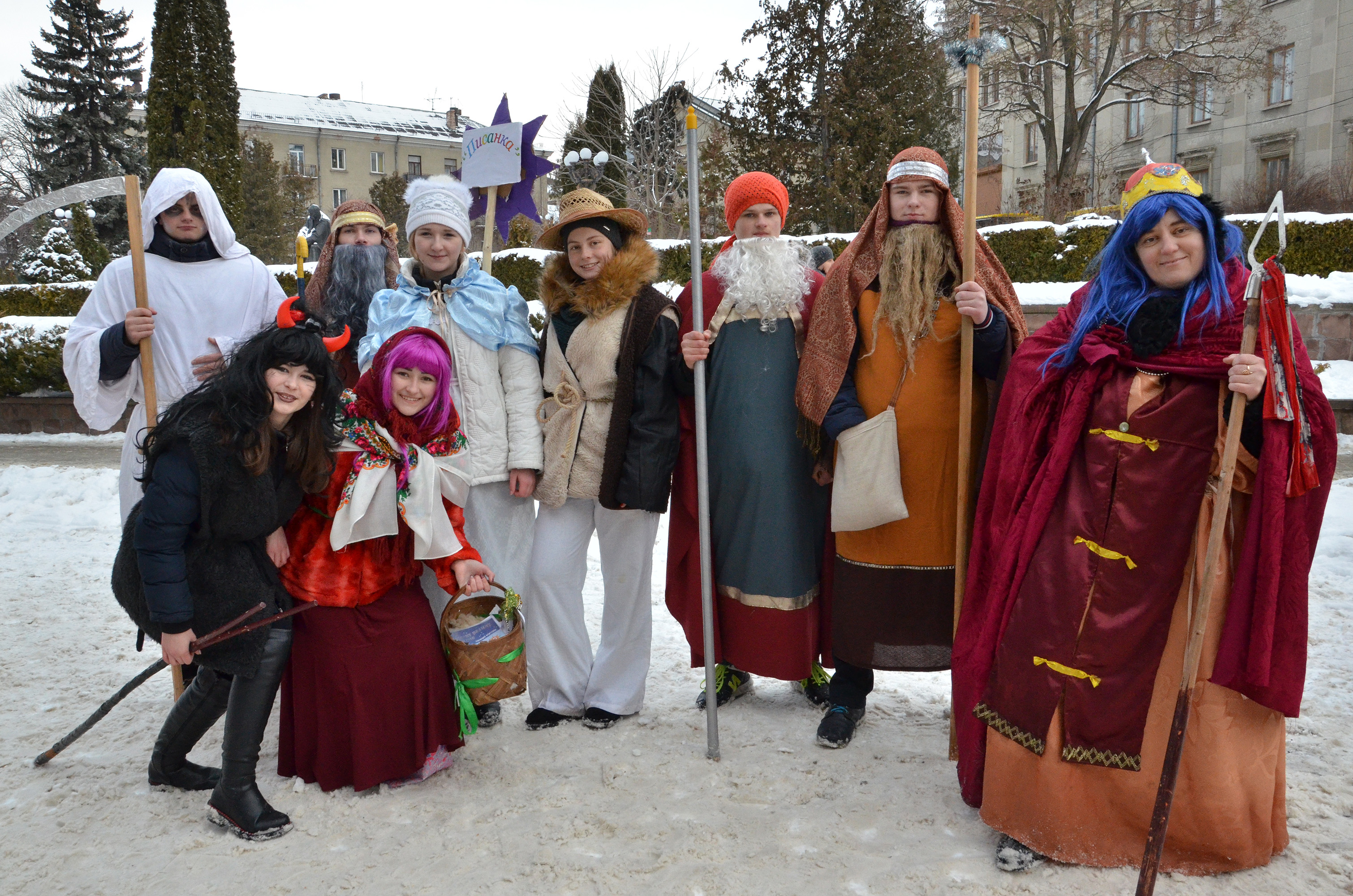
"Live" vertep performers from Movchanivka, Ternopil Oblast

Both the religious and the secular part of vertep involved music performances. The nativity scene would include the singing of kants, usually based on folk koliadkas, as a form of commentary. The secular part normally involved instrumental dance music, representing each hero with a characteristic tune: Kozachok, Krakowiak, Kamarinskaya, Jewish dances etc. Some musical elements of vertep would imitate animal noises. The orchestra used for the performance of vertep song usually consisted of three instruments: violin, bubon and sopilka. Cossack songs would also sometimes be included in vertep repertoire.

Along with the traditional puppet vertep, a "live" variety of the performance is popular. In some regions, for example Galicia, people in villages would dress as vertep characters and go from house to house, acting out nativity plays during Christmas holidays. This form of vertep provides more variety in acting and also gives an important role to the musical part.

== Notable verteps ==
- Sokyryntsi vertep or Galagan vertep (1771, modern-day Chernihiv Oblast) - music for the vertep has been preserved in records;
- Volyn vertep (1788-1791);
- Kupiansk vertep (1823);
- Slavutyn vertep (1897) - music has been preserved;
- Baturyn vertep (late 19th century) - music has been preserved;
- Khorol vertep (late 19th century).

A collection of vertep boxes and puppets is preserved at the Museum of Theatre, Music and Cinema Arts of Ukraine.

== See also ==
- Batlejka (Batleyka) – analogue in Belarusian culture
- Kamishibai
- Krakow szopka
- Petrushka

== Sources ==
- Литературная энциклопедия 1929–1939, Article "Вертепная драма".
- Entsyklopediya ukrainoznavstva Vol 1. p. 232, Paris, 1955.
