= Leontovych Music Society =

Ukrainian organization

Leontovych Music Society (Ukr: Музичне товариство ім. М.А. Леонтовича) was a Ukrainian community organization, active in 1921–1928. It was named for the memory of Mykola Leontovych, Ukrainian composer, who was killed by chekist 9 day before.

== Establishing ==
On February 1, 1921, a large group of cultural figures, professors, and students gathered at the Lysenko music school to commemorate 9 days after Mykola Leontovych's death, according to Christian ritual. The organizing committee included composers Kyrylo Stetsenko, Boris Lyatoshinsky, Mykhailo Verykivsky, Hryhoriy Veryovka art critics Klyment Kvitka, Dmytro Revutsky, Boleslav Yavorsky, theatre director Les Kurbas, poet Pavlo Tychyna and others.

In April 1921, an official permission was received. In the letter, addressed to Mykola Leontovych's father, the following aim of the society was presented:

The Presidium of the Committee of Memory of Mykola Leontovych, informing you about the establishment of the All-Ukrainian Committee of Memory of the Deceased, in order to honor his memory, publish his works and promote Ukrainian musical culture, expresses its heartfelt condolences on the death of your son and together with you bewails for one of the best sons of the Ukrainian people, and invites you to participate and work in the Committee as a member. Let the untimely death of Mykola Dmytrovych serve the cause of national culture revival and development

== Activities ==
In 1922, the artists held a broad action in Kyiv to commemorate the anniversary of the composer's death, held a public general meeting, organise over 60 concerts in Ukraine. After Mykola Leontovych one of Kyiv street was renamed.

In 1923 The magazine "Music" was founded as a publication of the Leontovych Music Society. Ukrainian music encyclopedy (2011). Vol. 3. P. 522. From 1923 to January 1928 (that is, until the last month of the Society's existence) Kyiv (singles in Kharkiv and Odesa) hosted the Galician Music Evenings, which featured works by Stanislav Lyudkevych, Vasyl Barvinsky, Ostap Nyzhankivsky, Filaret Kolessa, Denis Sichinsky; evenings in memory of Ivan Franko, meetings with Filaret Kolessa and Vasyl Barvinsky are held.

In the spring of 1927 the Society registered 1,014 musical organizations in Ukraine; peasant choirs – 347, workers' – 211, school – 367, workers' and peasants' orchestras – 82, professional choirs – 7. It is noticeable that most choirs, including bandura choirs, were named after Leontovich or Lysenko, which testified to the authority of these artists in the masses.

== Liquidation ==
At the beginning of 1926, a group of composers from the Kharkiv branch accused the Society of pursuing the Ukrainian nationalist line and deviating from the tasks of revolutionary proletarian art. They created the Association of Revolutionary Composers of Ukraine – ARCU, which, unlike the Association of Contemporary Music, should, in their opinion, completely replace the Society.

On October 3, 1926, the presidium of the Society was transferred to Kharkiv, under the "watchful eye" of the People's Commissariat. During this year, not a single issue of the magazine "Music" was published. And in February 1928, after subjecting the Society's activities to devastating criticism at the governmental level, it was liquidated. The All-Ukrainian Society of Revolutionary Musicians was established instead.
