= Hryhoriy Galagan =

Ukrainian philanthropist

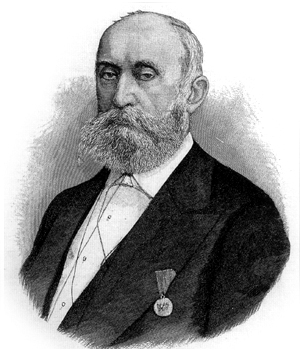
Hryhoriy Galagan

Hryhoriy Pavlovych Galagan (Ukrainian: Григорій Павлович Ґалаґан; 15 August 1819 – 25 September 1888) was a landowner, philanthropist, ethnographer and communal leader of Ukrainophile orientation, who played a major role in Ukrainian cultural and social life under Russian imperial rule in the 19th century. In 1871 he established the Pavlo Galagan College in Kyiv, which now houses the National Museum of Literature of Ukraine.

== Biography ==
Hryhoriy Galagan was born in Sokyryntsi, Pryluky povit, Chernihiv Governorate (now part of Sribne settlement hromada, Chernihiv Oblast); according to other information, he was born in Kyiv. The progenitor of Galagan family was a member of Cossack starshyna, who sided with the Tsardom of Russia during the Great Northern War, refusing to join hetman Ivan Mazepa in his alliance with the Swedes. By the 19th century, the family had become major landowners in the Poltava and Chernihiv governorates of Left-bank Ukraine.

In 1840 Hryhoriy graduated from the law faculty of Saint Petersburg University. He eventually found employment at the Chernihiv Chamber of State Properties, and in 1858 became a member of the local committee concerned with the amelioration of serfs' lives. Galagan took part in creation of a draft project on the abolition of serfdom, and following its approval by authorities worked on its implementation. A proponent of democracy, starting from 1865 he became an activist of Poltava zemstvo, where he became known as a patron of education.

Among Galagan's notable achievements in the social sphere was the creation of Ukraine's first peasants' savings bank in Sokyryntsi. He also contributed to the opening of two gymnasiums in Pryluky, and in 1876 donated his manor in Dihtiari to a crafts school. As a member of Kyiv Archeographic Commission, in 1881 Galagan worked on the reduction of redemption payments for peasants, and in 1882 became a member of the State Council. He died in 1888 in Sokyryntsi.

== Patron of culture and education ==
Galagan was a close acquaintance of Taras Shevchenko, Mykhailo Maksymovych, Volodymyr Antonovych and Panteleimon Kulish, and took part in activities of the Old Hromada in Kyiv. Shevchenko and Kulish were frequent guests at Galagan's manor in Sokyryntsi, along with composer Mykola Lysenko and artist Lev Zhemchuzhnikov. During the late 1850s, Galagan aided Kulish in establishing a printing house in St. Petersburg, which in 1861–1862 produced the Ukrainian monthly magazine Osnova.

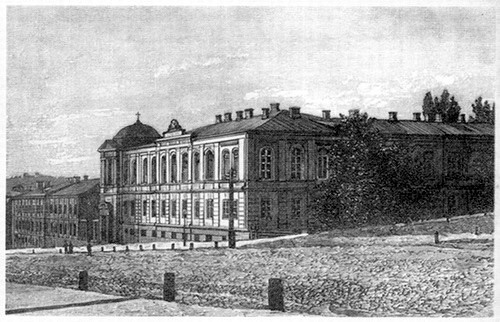
Pavlo Galagan College during the early 1900s

In memory of his son Pavlo, the last male descendant of Galagan family, who died at the age of 16, Hryhoriy established the Pavlo Galagan College in Kyiv. Opened in 1871, the college functioned as a private educational establishment for the social elite. Despite the ban on Ukrainian education active during that time, the college provided extracurricular classes and exercises in Ukrainian language. Because of this, the tsarist okhrana would characterize it as a "hotbed of Ukrainianism". Among the establishment's teachers were Mykola Murashko and Mykola Pymonenko, and the list of its alumni included Ahatanhel Krymsky, Pavlo Fylypovych and Mykhailo Drai-Khmara. Many of the college's graduates became prominent scientists and political figures.

In 1873–1875 Galagan served as chairman of the Southwestern Department of Russian Geographical Society, which engaged in Ukrainian studies. He was an author of several ethnographic publications dedicated to Ukrainian folk culture. Galagan was also a sponsor of the Kievskaya Starina magazine.

== Political views ==
Known for his friendship with Slavophile intellectuals, throughout his life Galagan stood on Ukrainophile positions and had a good knowledge of Ukrainian history. At the same time, he preserved a positive attitude to Russia and opposed ideas of Ukrainian autonomy or independence.

== Gallery ==
Galagan family coat of arms (Hipocentaur)

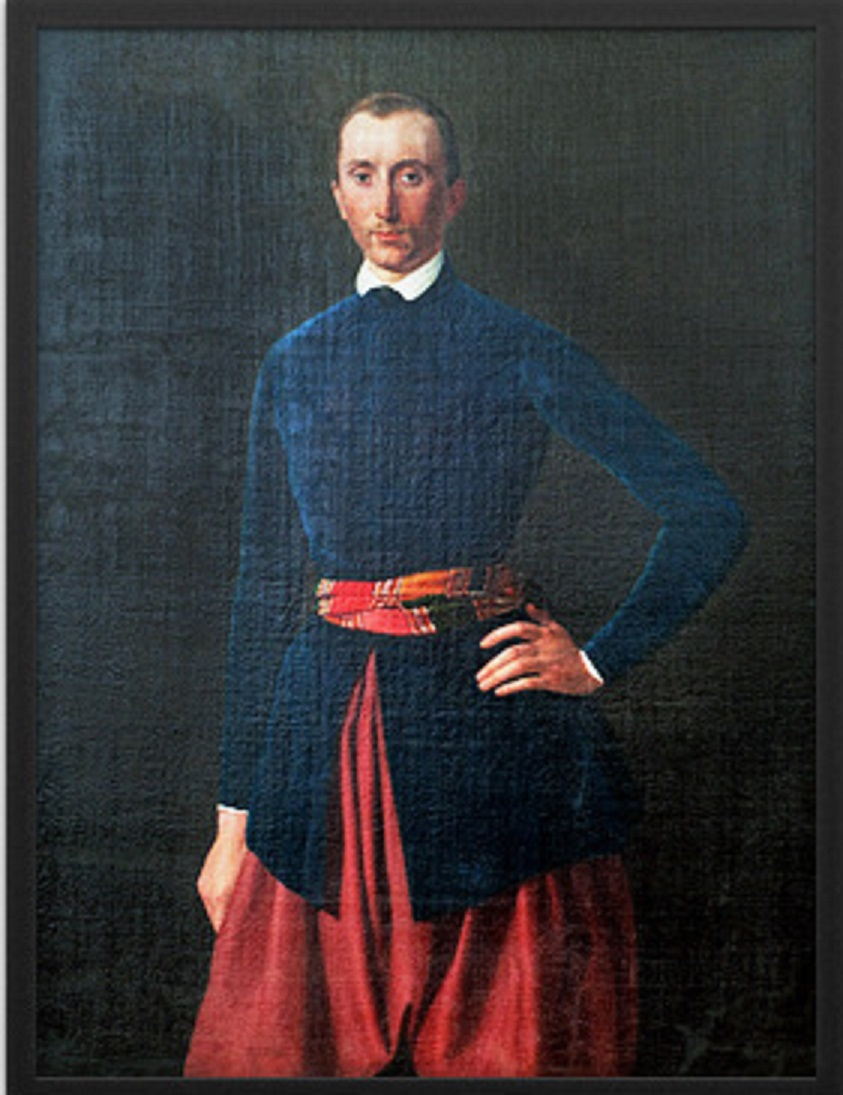
Galagan's portrait in Cossack attire, 1843

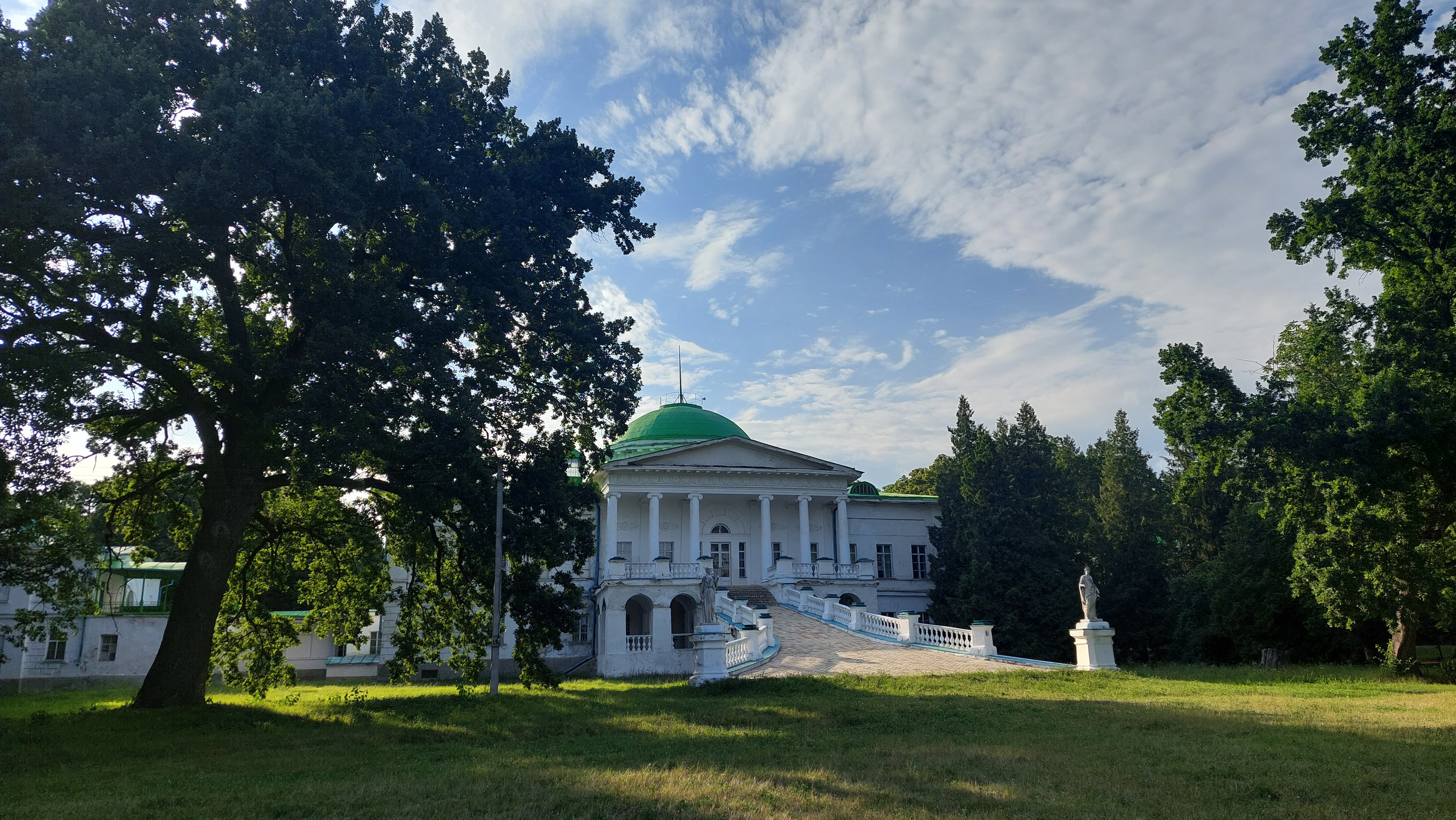
Galagan family manor in Sokyryntsi

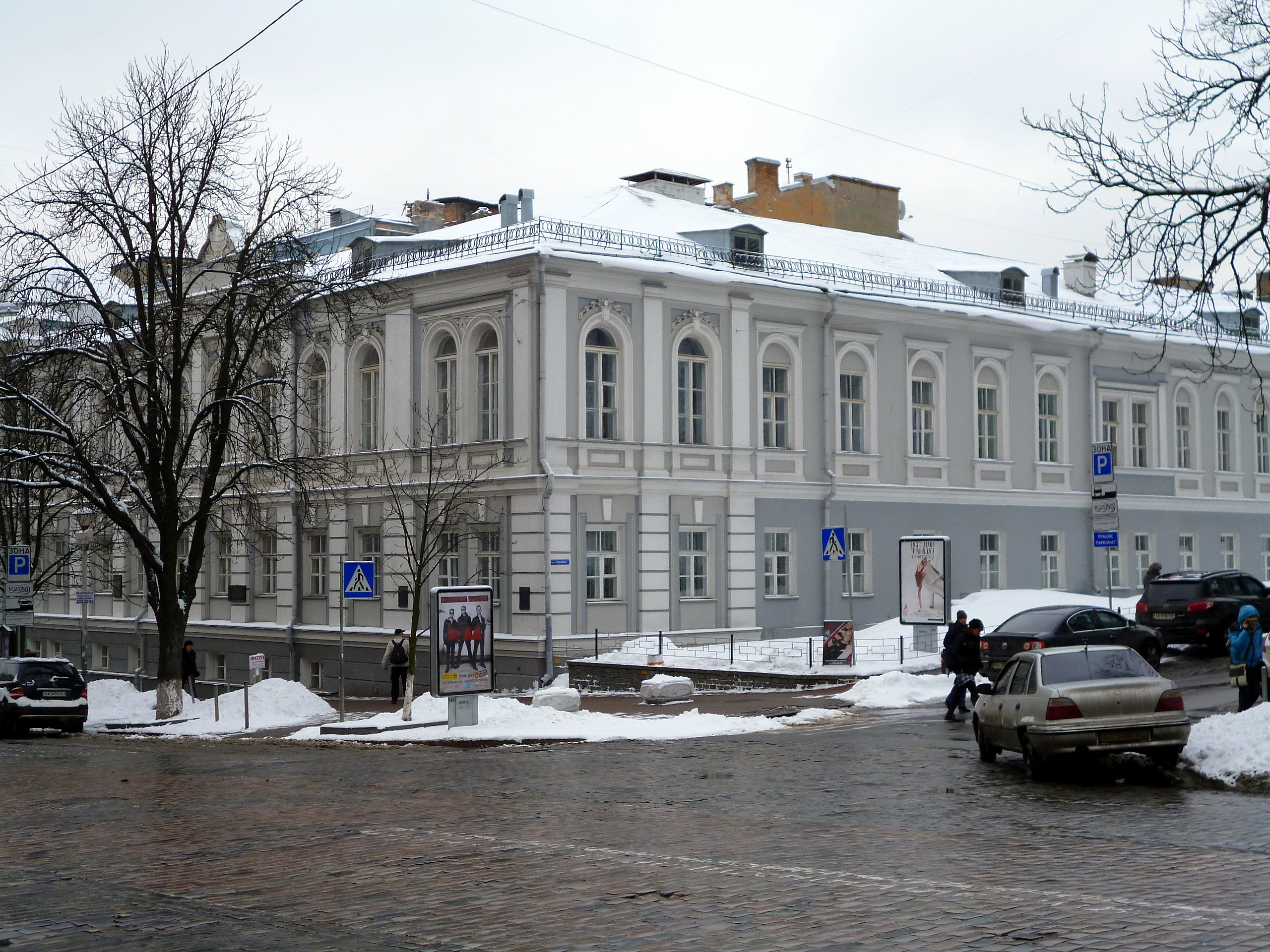
Modern view of Pavlo Galagan College

== See also ==
- Ukrainian cooperative movement
- Yelyzaveta Myloradovych
