= Veryovka =

Veryovka may refer to:

- Hryhoriy Veryovka (1895–1964) - Soviet and Ukrainian composer and choir director
  - Veryovka Ukrainian Folk Choir - founded by and later named for him
