= Popilnia Raion =

Former subdivision of Zhytomyr Oblast, Ukraine

Popilnia Raion Попільнянський район
- Raion
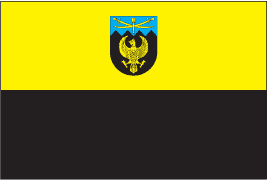
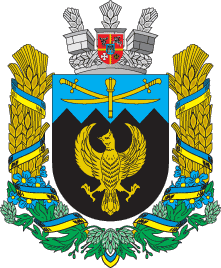
- Flag Coat of arms

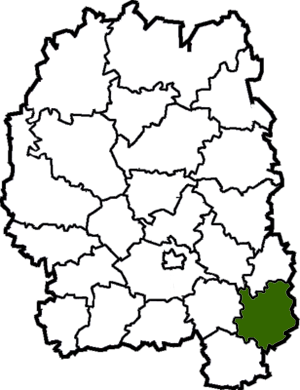
- Coordinates: 49°56′43″N 29°27′11″E
- Country: Ukraine
- Oblast: Zhytomyr Oblast
- Disestablished: 18 July 2020
- Admin. center: Popilnia
- Subdivisions: List: 0 — city councils; 2 — settlement councils; — rural councils; Number of localities: 0 — cities; 2 — urban-type settlements; — villages; — rural settlements

Area
  - Total: 1,037 km^{2} (400 sq mi)

Population (2020)
  - Total: 30,106 ▼
  - Density: 29.03/km^{2} (75.19/sq mi)
- Time zone: UTC+02:00 (EET)
  - Summer (DST): UTC+03:00 (EEST)
- Area code: +380

Popilnia Raion (Ukrainian: Попільнянський район) was a raion (district) of Zhytomyr Oblast, northern Ukraine. Its administrative centre was located at Popilnia. The raion covered an area of 1,037 square kilometres (400 mi^{2}). The raion was abolished on 18 July 2020 as part of the administrative reform of Ukraine, which reduced the number of raions of Zhytomyr Oblast to four. The area of Popilnia Raion was merged into Zhytomyr Raion. The last estimate of the raion population was 30,106 (2020 est.)

== Notable people ==
- Ivan Samoilovych (?—1690) — a native of Khodorkiv, hetman of the Zaporozhian Army, political and military figure.
- Yosyp Viacheslavovych Yurkevych (1855—1910) — zemstvo doctor, owner of an estate in Kryvyi Rih. He built a school and the first power station in the village.
- Maksym Rylskyi (1895—1964) — poet, scientist and public figure, academician of the USSR Academy of Sciences and the Ukrainian Academy of Sciences, twice winner of the USSR State Prize and the Lenin Prize. He spent his childhood and youth in the village of Romanivka.
- Andrii Vitruk (1902—1946) — attack pilot, Hero of the Soviet Union. He was born in the village of Andrushky.
- Kasyan Yevchenko (1925—2009) — musician, master of folk instruments, director of the ensembles "Huk", "Huchok" and "Huchenia", soloist, former member of the Hryhorii Veriovka National Honoured Folk Choir of Ukraine.
