= Ihor Piaskovsky =

Musicologist (1946–2012)

Ihor Boleslavovych Piaskovsky (Ukrainian: Ігор Болеславович Пясковський, December 15, 1946, Vienna — July, 2nd 2012) was a Ukrainian musicologist, Doctor of Arts, Professor, Head of the Department of Music Theory at the Ukrainian National Tchaikovsky Academy of Music in 2007–2012.

In 1970, he graduated from the historical and theoretical faculty of the Kyiv Conservatory in the class of F. I. Aerova. He also studied composition with Yurii Ishchenko, completed his postgraduate studies (1970–1974), and since 1973 has been a senior lecturer at the Department of History of Ukrainian and Russian Music, later an associate professor and then a professor at the Department of Music Theory at the Kyiv Conservatory. In 1990, he defended his doctoral dissertation ("Logical and Constructive Principles of Musical Thinking"), and since 2007 he has been the Head of the Department of Music Theory.

He is the author of the monograph "Logic of Musical Thinking" (Kyiv, 1987), a manual on polyphony for higher musical institutions (Kyiv, 2003), a textbook "Polyphony in Ukrainian Music" (2012), articles on the phenomenon and evolution of musical thinking, problems of musical semiotics, computer analysis and synthesis of musical texts. He is the author of Sonata for Flute and Piano (published in 1973), String Quartet, chamber opera The Adventures of John the Bold (based on works by S. Lem), piano works - the piano cycle “Fugues and Postludes”, Piano pieces "Three Fractals (Sea. Clouds. Birth of Rocks)," experimental pieces "Dominoes," "Sounding Schedule," and "Two in Five”.

== Selected publications ==
- Some issues of intonation genesis and development of modulation phenomena // Ukrainian musicology: a collection of articles. Issue 8 - Kyiv: Musical Ukraine, 1973. - P. 60–77.
- Gnoseological Analysis of Reflection Methods in Musical Creativity // Ethics and Aesthetics: a collection of articles. Issue 22 - Kyiv: Kyiv State University Press, 1979. - P. 111–118.
- Symphonic and chamber instrumental music. 1981, co-authored.
- Problematic methods of teaching in the course of polyphony on the example of the study of the probabilistic-statistical model of expositions of the fugues of "Well-Tempered Clavier" by J. S. Bach // Methods of teaching music-theoretical and music-historical disciplines: a collection of articles - K.: Musical Ukraine, 1983.
- Studies of musical culture. 1983.
- Some new aspects of the study of musical folklore // Folk art and ethnography. K. - 1984 - PP. 15–22.
- The logic of musical thinking / information note. - K.: Information Center for Culture and Art of the State Library of the Ukrainian SSR named after the CPSU, 1984. - 14 p.
- Analysis of the Means of Reflection in Musical Art // Methodology and Methods of Analysis of Musical Works: a collection of scientific papers - Kyiv: Kyiv State Conservatory named after P. Tchaikovsky, 1984. - P. 21–51.
- Criticism of Constructivism in the Work of Bourgeois Neo-formalist Composers of the 20th Century // Criticism of Modernist Currents in Western Musical Art of the 20th Century: a collection of articles - K.: Musical Ukraine, 1984. - P. 21–51.
- Interaction of Modal and Tonal-Functional Principles in Bach's Musical Thinking // Bach and Modernity: a collection of articles - Kyiv: Musical Ukraine, 1985. - P. 100–111.
- Logic of Musical Thinking. Monography. - K.: Musical Ukraine, 1987. 179, [3] p., with notes.
- Symbolic logic as a tool for studying the logical and constructive principles of musical thinking // Musical thinking: problems of analysis and modeling: a collection of scientific works. - Kyiv: P. Tchaikovsky Kyiv State Conservatory, 1988. - P. 24–30.
- To the problem of historical and stylistic evolution of musical thinking // Musical thinking: essence, categories, aspects of research: a collection of articles - K.: Musical Ukraine, 1989. - P. 141–152.
- Logical and Constructive Principles of Musical Thinking: Abstract of the Dissertation for the Doctor's Degree in Art History [not available from Lipnya 2019]. - Kyiv. derzh. conservatory named after P. I. Tchaikovsky, 1989. - 35 p.
- Khrestomatiya po istorii ukrainskoi musyky [Textbook on the history of Ukrainian music]: a textbook for students of music universities / comp. G.I. Tkachenko, I.B. Pyaskovsky, ed. by E. Zobkova - Moscow: Music, 1990. 192 p.
- M. Skoryk and A. Shenberg // Miroslav Skoryk. Scientific Bulletin of the Tchaikovsky National Music Academy of Ukraine. Issue 10. - K. : NMAU, 2000. - P. 35–40.
- Polyphony: a study guide. - Kyiv: DCMCCMU, 2003. - 242 p.
- Theoretical musicology in the study of Ukrainian national musical culture // Art History of Ukraine. Collection of scientific papers. Issue 10. - Kyiv: Academy of Arts of Ukraine, Institute of Contemporary Art Problems of the Academy of Arts of Ukraine, 2009. - P. 75–78.
- Logical and Artistic in Musical Thinking // Journal of the Tchaikovsky National Music Academy of Ukraine No. 1 (2), Kyiv: Tchaikovsky National Music Academy of Ukraine, 2009. P. 21 – 25.
- To the question of the integrity of the mythological system of Ukrainian folk song // Journal of the Tchaikovsky National Music Academy of Ukraine No. 2 (3), Kyiv: Tchaikovsky National Music Academy of Ukraine, 2009. P. 107 – 114.
- Music and cybernetics: a still relevant comparison of concepts // Journal of the Tchaikovsky National Music Academy of Ukraine No. 3 (4), Kyiv: Tchaikovsky National Music Academy of Ukraine, 2009. P. 90–103.
- The Way of Historical Development of Polyphonic Arrangement // Journal of the Tchaikovsky National Music Academy of Ukraine No. 3 (8), Kyiv: Tchaikovsky National Music Academy of Ukraine, 2010. P. 73–85.
- Interpretive Mechanisms in Imitative Polyphony // Journal of the Tchaikovsky National Music Academy of Ukraine No. 1 (10), Kyiv: Tchaikovsky National Music Academy of Ukraine, 2011. P. 31–39.
- Music and Space // Journal of the Tchaikovsky National Music Academy of Ukraine No. 2 (11), Kyiv: Tchaikovsky National Music Academy of Ukraine, 2011. P. 111–117.
- Pluralistic and Eurocentric Concepts in Musicology // Journal of the Tchaikovsky National Music Academy of Ukraine No. 4 (13), Kyiv: Tchaikovsky National Music Academy of Ukraine, 2011. P. 90–101.
- “Four Ukrainian Songs” by Leonid Hrabovsky // Journal of the Tchaikovsky National Music Academy of Ukraine No. 1 (14), Kyiv: Tchaikovsky National Music Academy of Ukraine, 2012. - P. 106–121.
- Polyphony in Ukrainian music: a study guide. To the 100th anniversary of the P. Tchaikovsky National Music Academy of Ukraine - Kyiv: P. Tchaikovsky National Music Academy of Ukraine, 2012. 272 p.
- Musical and Theoretical Ideas of Mykhailo Verykivsky // Scientific Bulletin of the Tchaikovsky National Music Academy of Ukraine - 2014. - Issue 112. - P. 52–65.

== Sources ==
- Pyaskovsky I. B. Historical and biographical sketch of the activity of teachers of the Department of Music Theory of the Tchaikovsky National Music Academy of Ukraine. In Journal of the Tchaikovsky National Music Academy of Ukraine: Scientific Journal - 2011 No. 1
- Kohanyk, IM (2012). "The light of the personality of Ihor Boleslavovich Pyaskovsky's – scientist, musician, teacher". Ukrainske muzykosznavstvo. No. 38. pp. 7–18.
- Kudrytskyi, AV; Labynskyi, MG (1997). Art of Ukraine: A Biographocal Guide (PDF). Kyiv: Bazhan Ukrainian Encyclopedia. ISBN 5-88500-071-9.
- Pyaskovskyi Ihor Boleslavovych (2018). Ukrainian music encyclopedia (PDF). Vol. 5. Kyiv: Rylsky Institute of Art Studies, Folklore and Ethnology.
- Fadyeyeva, Kateryna. (2018). Logical and Constructive Principles of Musical Thinking in the Composer's Creativity of Musicologist Igor Pyaskovsky. Bulletin of Kyiv National University of Culture and Arts. Series in Musical Art. 112–122. 10.31866/2616-7581.1.2018.146268.
- Olga Lysenko. MUSICAL PERFORMANCE IN THE ASPECT OF THE COGNITIVE PARADIGM OF MUSIC KNOWLEDGE. DOI: https://doi.org/10.30525/978-9934-588-13-6-3
- Kateryna Fadyeyeva. METHODS OF ARTIFICIAL INTELLIGENCE IN THEORETICAL MUSICOLOGY: HISTORICAL AND CONTEMPORARY PROJECTIONS DOI: https://doi.org/10.30525/978-9934-588-13-6-4.
- Tetiana Tuchynska. ABOUT CREATIVE METHOD OF I. PIASKOVSKY. TCHAIKOVSKY NATIONAL MUSIC ACADEMY OF UKRAINE R. GLIER KYIV INSTITUTE OF MUSIC MUSICOLOGY OF KYIV Cultorology and art studу Collected articles Issue number 51 Kyiv 2015. P. 20
