= Dihtiari =

Rural locality in Chernihiv Oblast, Ukraine

Dihtiari Дігтярі
- Rural settlement
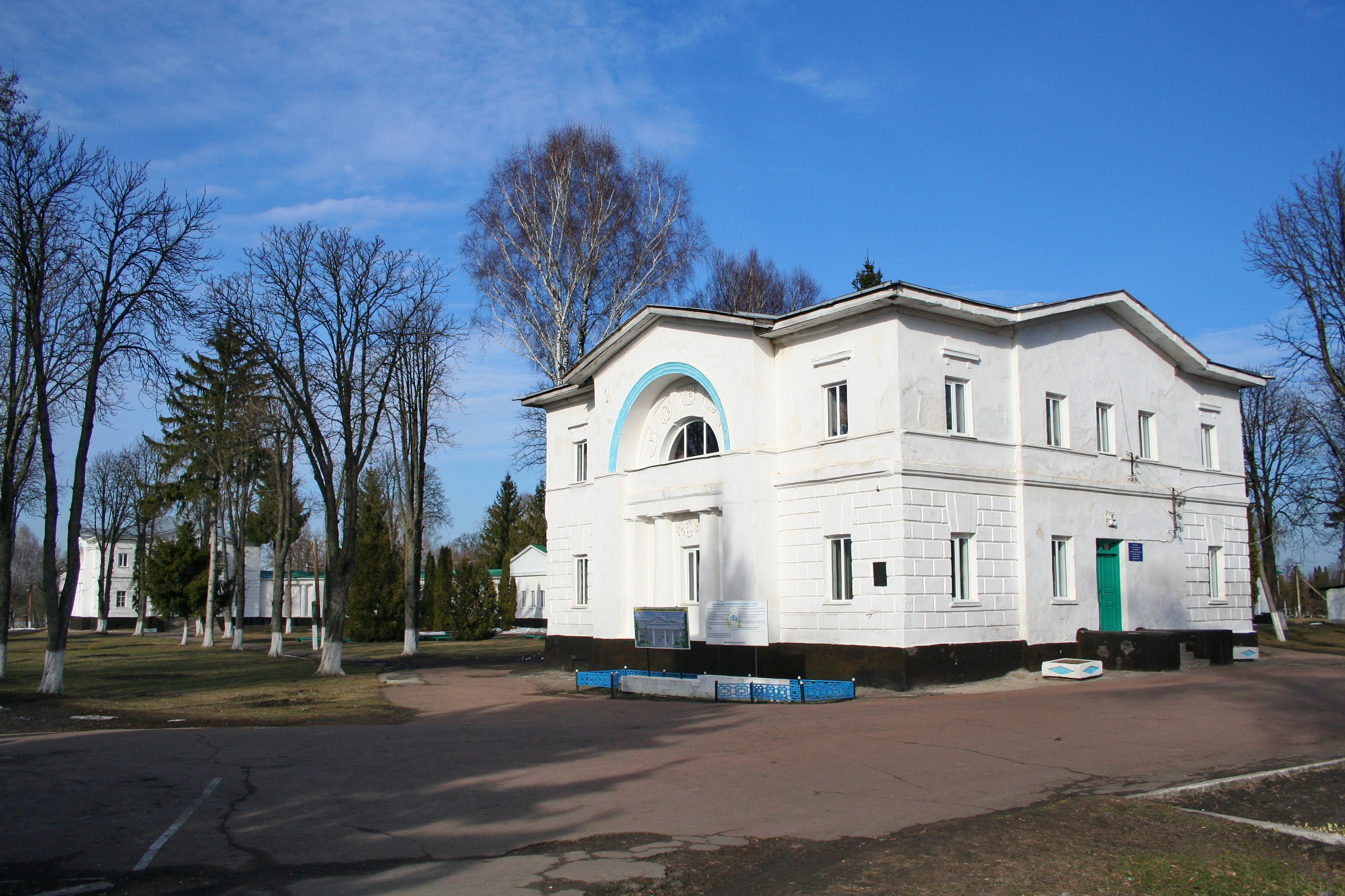
- Galagan manor in Dihtiari

- Location within Chernihiv Oblast Location within Ukraine
- Coordinates: 50°34′34″N 32°45′59″E
- Country: Ukraine
- Oblast: Chernihiv Oblast
- Raion: Pryluky Raion

Population (2022)
  - Total: 1,160
- Time zone: UTC+2 (EET)
  - Summer (DST): UTC+3 (EEST)

Dihtiari (Ukrainian: Дігтярі, Russian: Дегтяри) is a rural settlement in Pryluky Raion, Chernihiv Oblast, northern Ukraine. It is located on the left bank of the Udai in the drainage basin of the Dnieper. Dihtiari belongs to Sribne settlement hromada, one of the hromadas of Ukraine. Population: 1,160 (2022 estimate).

== History ==
Until 18 July 2020, Dihtiari belonged to Sribne Raion. The raion was abolished in July 2020 as part of the administrative reform of Ukraine, which reduced the number of raions of Chernihiv Oblast to five. The area of Sribne Raion was merged into Pryluky Raion.

Until 26 January 2024, Dihtiari was designated urban-type settlement. On this day, a new law entered into force which abolished this status, and Dihtiari became a rural settlement.

== Geography ==
The Dihtiari is located in the southeast of Chernihiv Oblast. The territory of the Dihtiari is located within the Dnieper Lowland. The relief of the settlement's surface is a lowland plain, in places dissected by river valleys. The Udai (Dnieper basin) and its tributaries flow through the Dihtiari. There are large areas of swamps around the village.

The climate of Dihtiari is moderately continental, with warm summers and relatively mild winters. The average temperature in January is about -7 °C, and in July - +19 °C. The average annual precipitation ranges from 550 to 660 mm, with the highest amount of precipitation in the summer period.

The soil cover of the Dihtiari is dominated by chernozem and podzolized soils. The hromada is located the forest steppe, on the Polesia. The main species in the forests are pine, oak, alder, ash, and birch.

== Economy ==
The leading sectors of the Dihtiari economy are agriculture and food industry.

=== Transportation ===
Dihtiari is connected by a road with Sribne, where there is access to Highway H07, which connects Kyiv and Sumy. In the opposite direction, the same road provides access to Pryluky and Pyriatyn.

== Culture ==
Dihtiari is known as a centre of traditional carpetmaking, as well as production of belts, dressmaking, decorative rushnyks and embroidery.

There is a historical monument in the settlement, the manor of Peter Galagan. It was built in the 19th century, the architect was P. Dubrovsky.
