= Kasyan Yevchenko =

Ukrainian musician, master of folk instruments

Kasyan Yevchenko Касян Дмитрович Євченко
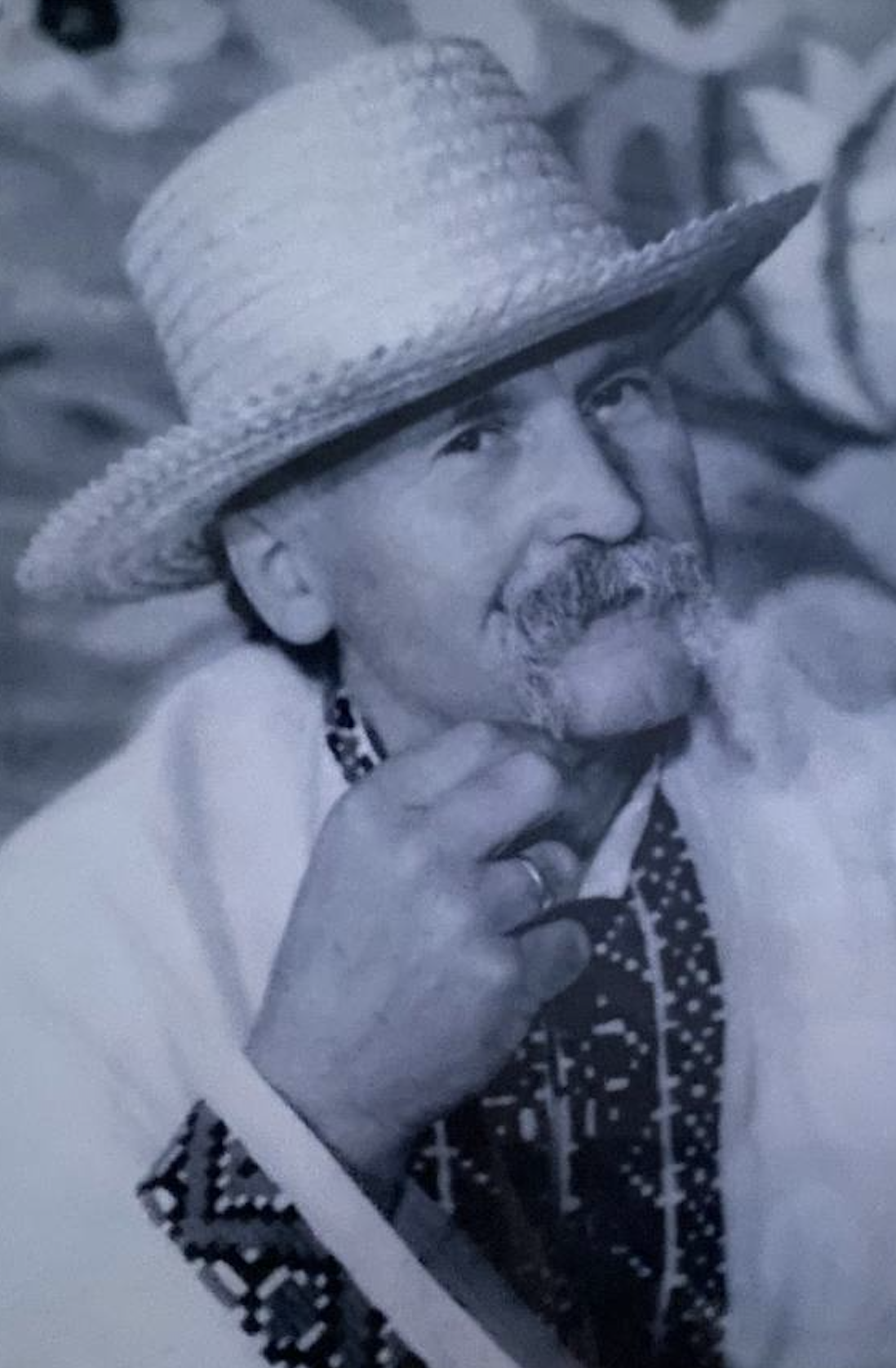

Background information
- Born: 20 March 1925; Zhydivtsi, Ukrainian SSR, Soviet Union
- Died: 24 October 2009 (aged 84) Kvitneve, Zhytomyr Oblast, Ukraine
- Occupation: Musician

Kasyan Dmytrovych Yevchenko (Note: Ukrainian: Касян Дмитрович Євченко, romanized: Kasian Dmytrovych Yevchenko) (20 March 1925 – 24 October 2009) was a Ukrainian musician, master of folk instruments, director of the ensembles "Guk", "Guchok" and "Guchenia", soloist of the Veryovka Ukrainian Folk Choir.

== Biography ==
Kasyan Yevchenk was born on 20 March 1925 in the village of Zhydivtsi (now Kvitneve, Popilnia district, Zhytomyr Oblast, Ukraine), into a family engaged in singing and peasant activities. He attended the Zhovtneve seven-year school. Kasyan Yevchenko experienced the Holodomor of 1932–1933. During the German-Soviet war, he actively participated in the conflict. In recognition of his courage and bravery demonstrated on the front lines, Kasyan was honored with the Order of the Patriotic War and the Medal for Battle Merit.

In 1946, Kasyan Yevchenko commenced employment at the Kyiv Main Post Office.

In 1948, he enrolled in the Kyiv Conservatory, focusing his studies on the bandura.

Between 1950 and 1984, Yevchenko served as a member of the Veryovka Ukrainian Folk Choir. His artistic contributions were acknowledged with the award of the Order of the Badge of Honour. He participated in international tours with the choir, spanning 37 countries. The repertoire of the Veryovka Ukrainian Folk Choir featured an instrumental piece titled "Wedding March", comprising Ukrainian folk melodies arranged by V. Popadiuk. This composition was performed by a six-member instrumental ensemble, including Kasyan Yevchenko, who played the goat, trumpet, and horn.

In 1983, Kasyan Yevchenko established the ensemble "Troistykh Muzyky" utilizing the facilities of the house of culture in the village of Zhovtneve (Kvitneve).

On 20 October 2009, Kasyan Yevchenko sustained a fracture to his goat's bone while returning home from a performance at the Zhytomyr region's creative report at the National Palace of Arts "Ukraine". Three days later, on 24 October 2009, at the age of 84, Kasyan Yevchenko passed away.

== Discography ==
- 1991 - Documentary film "Polka with a Gots" (Ukrainian: Полька з гоцем) Ukrtelefilm.
- 1991 - Documentary "Oh, the Boys Were Coming from the Fair" (Ukrainian: Ой, да ішли хлопці з ярмарку) Ukrtelefilm.
