= Monastyrok, Vinnytsia Oblast =

Village in Vinnytsia Oblast, Ukraine

Monastyrok Монастирок
- Village
- Location in Vinnytsia Oblast Monastyrok (Ukraine)
- Coordinates: 48°58′22″N 28°51′44″E
- Country: Ukraine
- Oblast: Vinnytsia Oblast
- Raion: Vinnytsia Raion
- Hromada: Nemyriv urban hromada
- Time zone: UTC+2 (EET)
  - Summer (DST): UTC+3 (EEST)
- Postal code: 22801

Monastyrok (Ukrainian: Монастирок) is a village in the Nemyriv urban hromada of the Vinnytsia Raion of Vinnytsia Oblast in Ukraine.

== History ==
Near the village, settlements of Trypillian and Zarubintsy cultures were investigated.

On 19 July 2020, as a result of the administrative-territorial reform and liquidation of the Nemyriv Raion, the village became part of the Vinnytsia Raion.

== Notable residents ==
- Mykola Leontovych (1877–1921), Ukrainian composer, and conductor

== Sources ==
- "Monasterskie". Geographical Dictionary of the Kingdom of Poland (in Polish). 6. Warszawa: Kasa im. Józefa Mianowskiego. 1885. p. 654.
