= Sribne Raion =

Former subdivision of Chernihiv Oblast, Ukraine

Sribne Raion Срібнянський район
- Raion
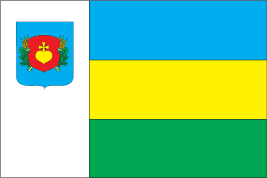
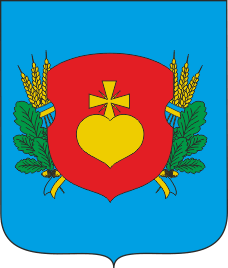
- Flag Coat of arms

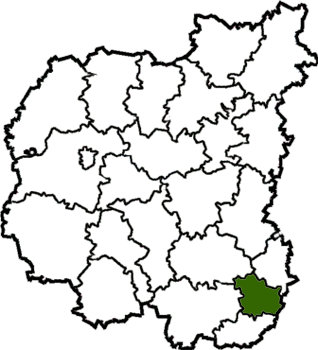
- Raion location in Chernihiv Oblast
- Coordinates: 50°38′34″N 32°53′36″E
- Country: Ukraine
- Oblast: Chernihiv Oblast
- Disestablished: 18 July 2020
- Admin. center: Sribne

Area
  - Total: 579 km^{2} (224 sq mi)

Population (2020)
  - Total: 10,691
  - Density: 18.5/km^{2} (47.8/sq mi)
- Time zone: UTC+2 (EET)
  - Summer (DST): UTC+3 (EEST)
- Website: http://sribadm.cg.gov.ua/

Sribne Raion (Ukrainian: Срібнянський район) was a raion (district) of Chernihiv Oblast, northern Ukraine. Its administrative centre was located at the urban-type settlement of Sribne. The raion was abolished on 18 July 2020 as part of the administrative reform of Ukraine, which reduced the number of raions of Chernihiv Oblast to five. The area of Sribne Raion was merged into Pryluky Raion. The last estimate of the raion population was 10,691 (2020 est.)

At the time of disestablishment, the raion consisted of one hromada, Sribne settlement hromada with the administration in Sribne.
