= Batlejka =

Belarusian amateur puppet theatre

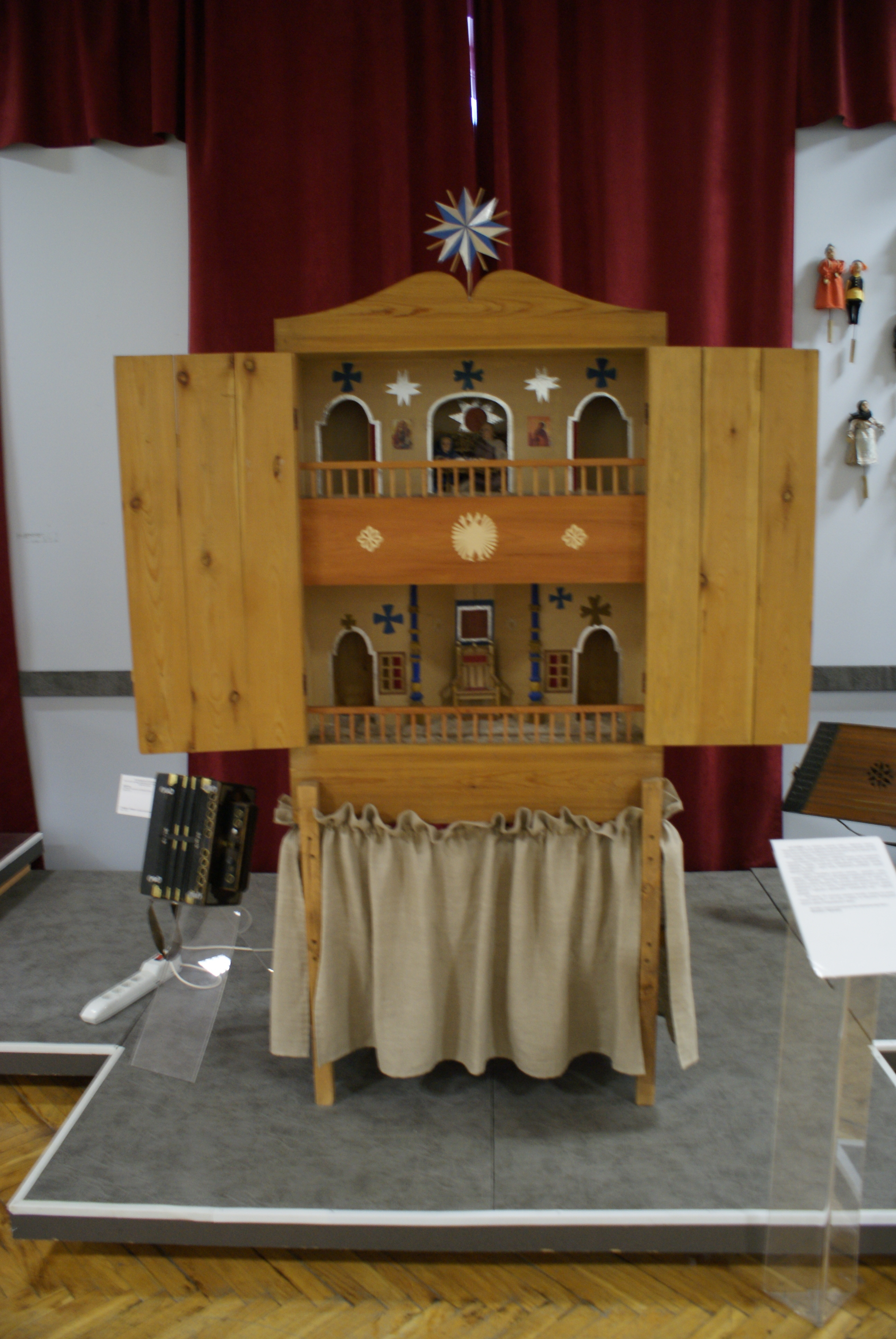
Batlejka booth in the Belarusian National History Museum

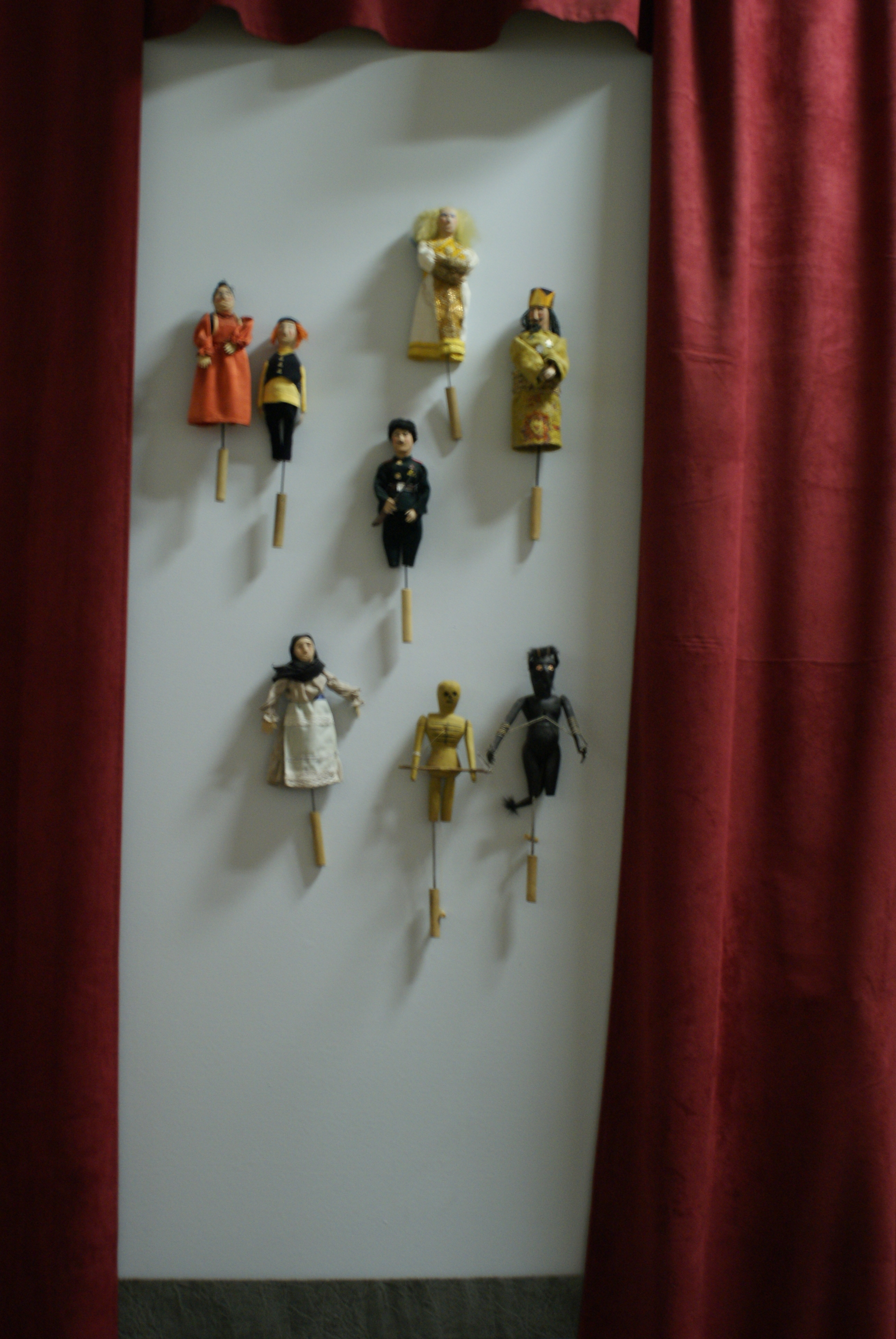
Batlejka puppets in the Belarusian National History Museum

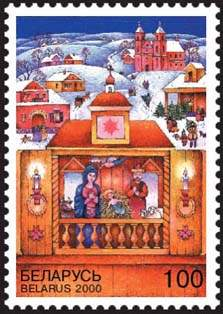
Batlejka depicted on a Belarusian post stamp

Batlejka (Batleyka; Belarusian: Батле́йка) is a Belarusian amateur puppet theatre. Its name is derived from the city of Bethlehem and performances are traditionally given over the Christmas period.

It became popular in Belarus in the 16th century but the peak of its popularity falls on the 18–19th centuries. It was largely forgotten during Soviet times but revived in present-day Belarus and within the Belarusian diaspora.

== Puppet booth and puppets ==
Puppets on metal rods are led by a puppeteer hiding behind a wooden booth with doors. The booth has two levels – the upper ‘heavenly’ or ‘canonical’ level and the lower ‘earthly’ or ‘layman’ level.

Puppets were traditionally made of wood and dressed in colourful miniature clothes.

== Plot ==
=== Part 1: Nativity ===
King Herod learns from the Three Kings that the Saviour is born. Considering him a rival, King Herod decides to kill Jesus.

He order a soldier to go to Bethlehem and kill all newly born babies. The soldier obeys the order and kills all babies except a baby of Rachael. Angry Herod orders to kill Rachael's baby too.

Herod pays with his life for these crimes – the Death beheads Herod and his body is taken to Hell by the Devil. The soldier soon follows his master.

=== Part 2: Folk scenes ===
This part comprises a number of humorous and satirical episodes involving multiple characters – peasants, tradesmen, aristocracy, etc.

While Part 1 was performed throughout Belarus with little variations, Part 2 varies significantly depending on the geographical region of the performance and the imagination of a particular puppeteer.

== See also ==
- Vertep – analogue in Ukrainian culture
