= Mykola Leontovych =

Ukrainian composer, conductor, ethnomusicologist and teacher (1877–1921)

- Микола Леонтович
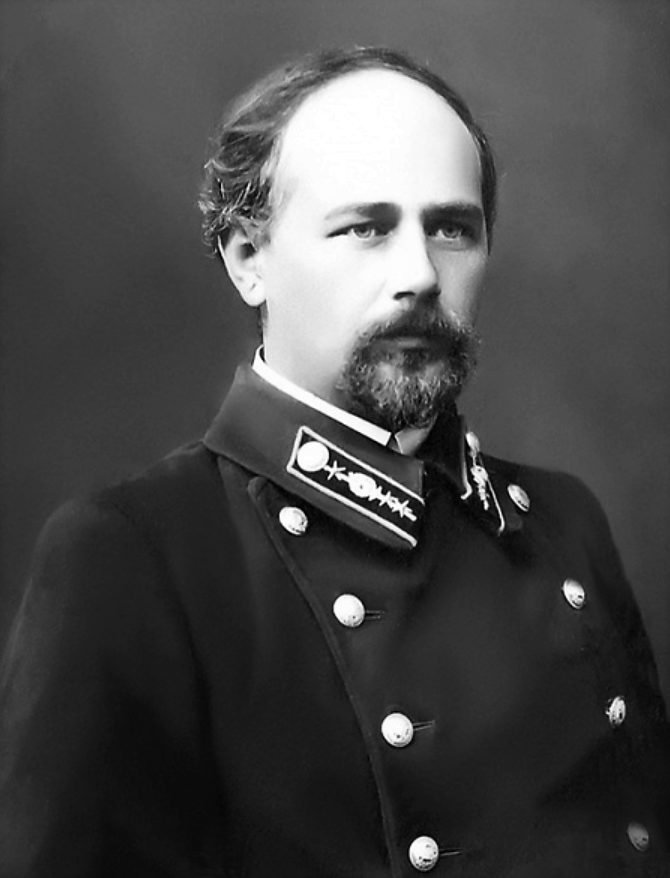
- Born: 13 December [O.S. 1 December] 1877; Monastyrok, Russian Empire (now Ukraine)
- Died: 23 January 1921 (aged 43); Markivka, Ukrainian SSR
- Occupations: Composer; conductor; ethnomusicologist

Mykola Dmytrovych Leontovych (Ukrainian: Микола Дмитрович Леонтович, pronounced [mɪˈkɔlɐ ˈdmɪtrowɪtʃ leonˈtɔwɪtʃ]; 13 December [O.S. 1 December] 1877 – 23 January 1921) was a Ukrainian composer, conductor, ethnomusicologist, and teacher. His music was inspired by the Ukrainian composer Mykola Lysenko and the Ukrainian National Music School. Leontovych specialised in a cappella choral music, ranging from original compositions to church music to elaborate arrangements of folk music.

Leontovych was born and raised in Monastyrok in the Podolia province of the Russian Empire (now in Vinnytsia Oblast, west of Ukraine). He was educated as a priest in the Kamianets-Podilskyi Theological Seminary. With the independence of the Ukrainian State in the 1917 revolution, he moved to Kyiv, where he worked at the Kyiv Conservatory and the Mykola Lysenko Institute of Music and Drama. He composed "Shchedryk" in 1914 (premiered in 1916), now known to the English-speaking world as "Carol of the Bells". He was murdered by a Soviet agent in 1921 and is known as a martyr in the Eastern Orthodox Ukrainian Church, where he is also remembered for his liturgy, the first composed in the vernacular, specifically in the modern Ukrainian language.

During his lifetime, Leontovych's compositions and arrangements became popular with musicians across the Ukrainian region of the Russian Empire. Performances of his works in Western Europe and North America earned him the nickname "the Ukrainian Bach". Apart from "Shchedryk", Leontovych's music is performed primarily in Ukraine and by the Ukrainian diaspora.

== Biography ==
=== Early life ===
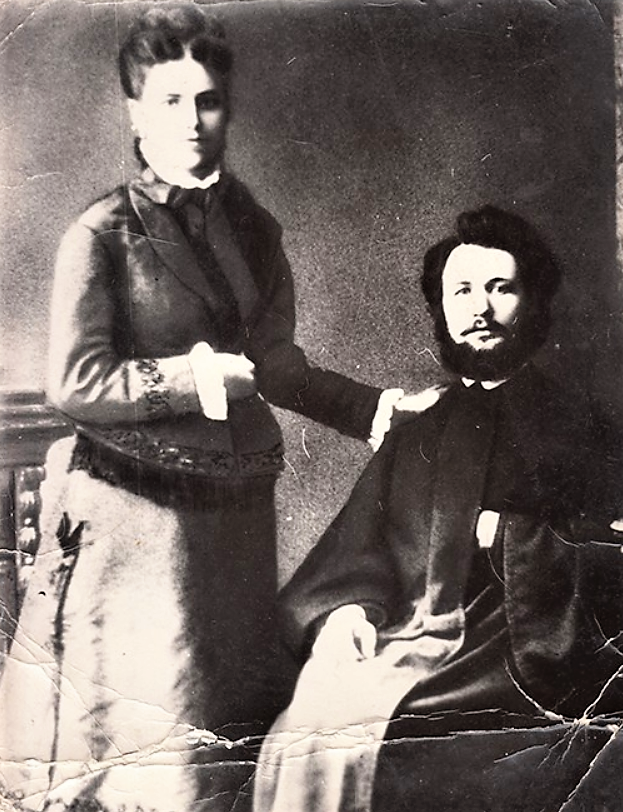
Mariya and Dmytro Leontovych

Mykola Dmytrovych Leontovych was born on 13 December [O.S. 1 December] 1877 in Monastyrok, near the village of Selevyntsi, in the Podolia province of Ukraine (then a part of the Russian Empire). He was the eldest of five surviving children (Mykola, Oleksandr (born in 1879), Maria (born in 1885), Victoria (born in 1886), and Olena). His father, grandfather, and great-grandfather were village priests. Both his mother, Mariya Yosypivna Leontovych, and his father, Dmytro Feofanovych Leontovych, were singers.

Mykola's father, who directed a school choir, and was skilled at playing the cello, double bass, harmonium, violin, and guitar, gave his son musical lessons. All the siblings grew up to have careers in music: Oleksandr became a professional singer, Mariya went on to study singing in Odesa, Olena studied fortepiano at the Kyiv Conservatory, and Victoriya learnt to play several musical instruments.

In 1879, Dmytro Leontovych was moved to serve as a priest in the village of Shershni. In 1887, Mykola was admitted to a school at Nemyriv. Due to financial problems a year later, his father transferred him to the Sharhorod Spiritual Beginners School, whose pupils received full financial support. At the school, Leontovych mastered singing and was able to freely read difficult passages from religious choral texts.

=== Theological seminary ===
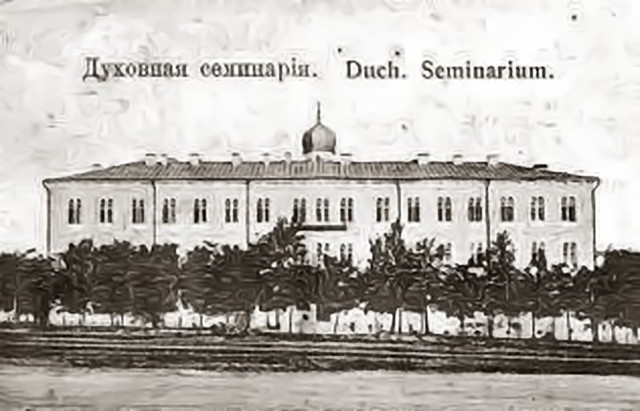
The Podolia Theological Seminary in 1865

In 1892, Leontovych began his studies at the Podolia Theological Seminary in Kamianets-Podilskyi, which both his father and grandfather had attended. His younger brother Oleksandr was enrolled as well, graduating after his brother. Whilst at the seminary, Leontovych continued to advance his skills on the violin, and learned to play the flute and the harmonium. He sang in the choir, and when an orchestra was formed during the third year of his studies, he joined it. He studied music theory under Y. Bogdanov, and composed his first choral arrangements, including "Oy z-za hory kamʺyanoyi ("Oh, from the stony mountain"), Oy pidu ya v lis po drova ("Oh, I’ll go to a forest for firewood"), and, Mala maty odnu dochku ("A mother has one daughter').

Leontovych conducted the seminary's orchestra and choir. Without his teachers knowing, he attended the opera in Kamianets-Podilskyi. One of the last performances he conducted at the seminary was a concert on 26 May 1899, when his friends wrote on a photograph: "To the future glorious composer". After graduating in 1899, he decided to break the family tradition by becoming a school teacher instead of a priest.

=== Early musical career and marriage ===
Leontovych's first teaching post, which commenced in September 1899, involved working as a teacher of singing and arithmetic at a secondary school in the village of Chukiv (present-day Vinnytsia Oblast). Later, when recalling his time there, he wrote: "I cannot complain that the students and villagers treated me unfavourably; due to my inexperience and youth, I was not a good school teacher. Certainly, my mistakes and errors in general educational activities were compensated to some extent by my musical teaching." When he later became a professor at the Kyiv Conservatory, he wrote a book about his early experiences,Yak ya orhanizuvav orkestr u silʹsʹkiy shkoli (How I Organised an Orchestra in a Village School).

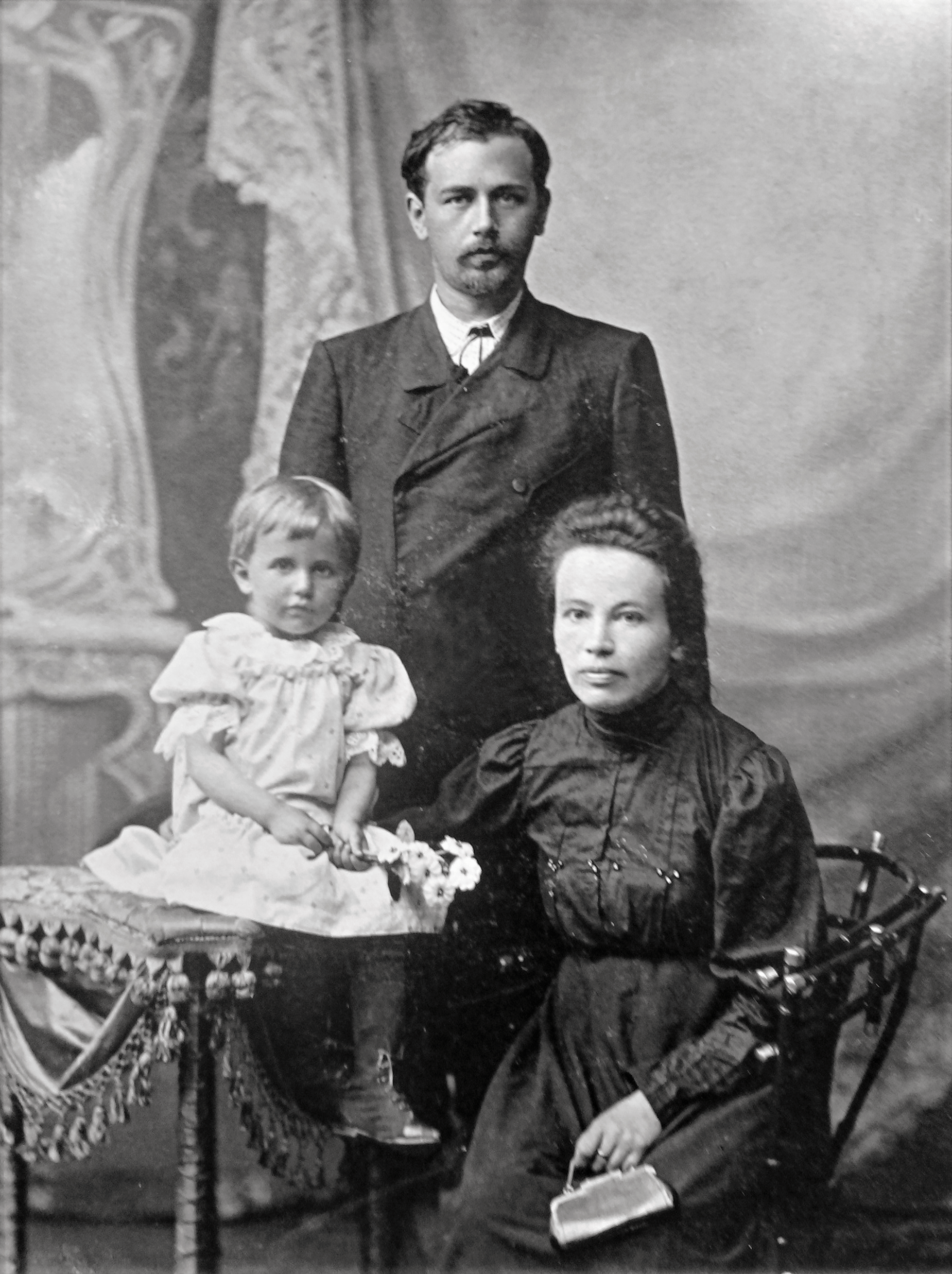
A photograph of Leontovych with his wife Claudia and their daughter Halyna in c. 1905

On 4 March 1901, following disagreements between Leontovych and the school's administrators, he obtained a teaching post at the Theological College in Tyvriv, where he taught church music and calligraphy. He organised the college's amateur choir and orchestra, and included arrangements of folk songs among the usual religious works performed by the choristers, as well as original compositions. One such work was based on a poem by Taras Shevchenko, Zore moya vechirnyaya (Oh My Evening Star). He organized a choir and a small orchestra at the school, which performed some of his works, as well as others by Russian and European composers. Whilst working at the school, he began to collect songs from Polissia. The first set was not published, but The Second Collection of Songs from Polissia was published in Kyiv in 1903. Leontovych bought back all 300 copies after becoming dissatisfied with the publication, commenting as a joke, "Let me go to the Dnipro."

Leontovych married a Volhynian girl named Claudia Feropontovna Zholtkevych on 22 March 1902. Their first daughter, Halyna, was born in 1903. They later had a second daughter, Yevheniya. During 1902, financial hardship prompted Leontovych to accept an offer to move to Vinnytsia to teach at the Church-Educators' College. There he organised a choir and a concert band, which performed both secular and spiritual music.

During 1903/04, Leontovych attended lectures held at the St. Petersburg Court Capella, where he studied music theory, harmony, polyphony, and choral performance. On 22 April 1904, he earned his credentials as a choirmaster of church choruses. In the autumn of 1904, he began working as a singing teacher in Grishino (now Pokrovsk, Ukraine), a railway town in the Donetsk region. Leontovych organised a choir of workers, who sang arrangements of Ukrainian, Jewish, Armenian, Russian, and Polish folk songs. He created a small orchestra to accompany the soloists, and prepared a repertoire of works by the Ukrainian composers Mykola Lysenko and Petro Nishchynsky. Leontovych's activity caused a deterioration in his relationship with the authorities, and in the spring of 1908, he was forced to leave his post and move back to Tulchyn.

=== Tulchyn period ===
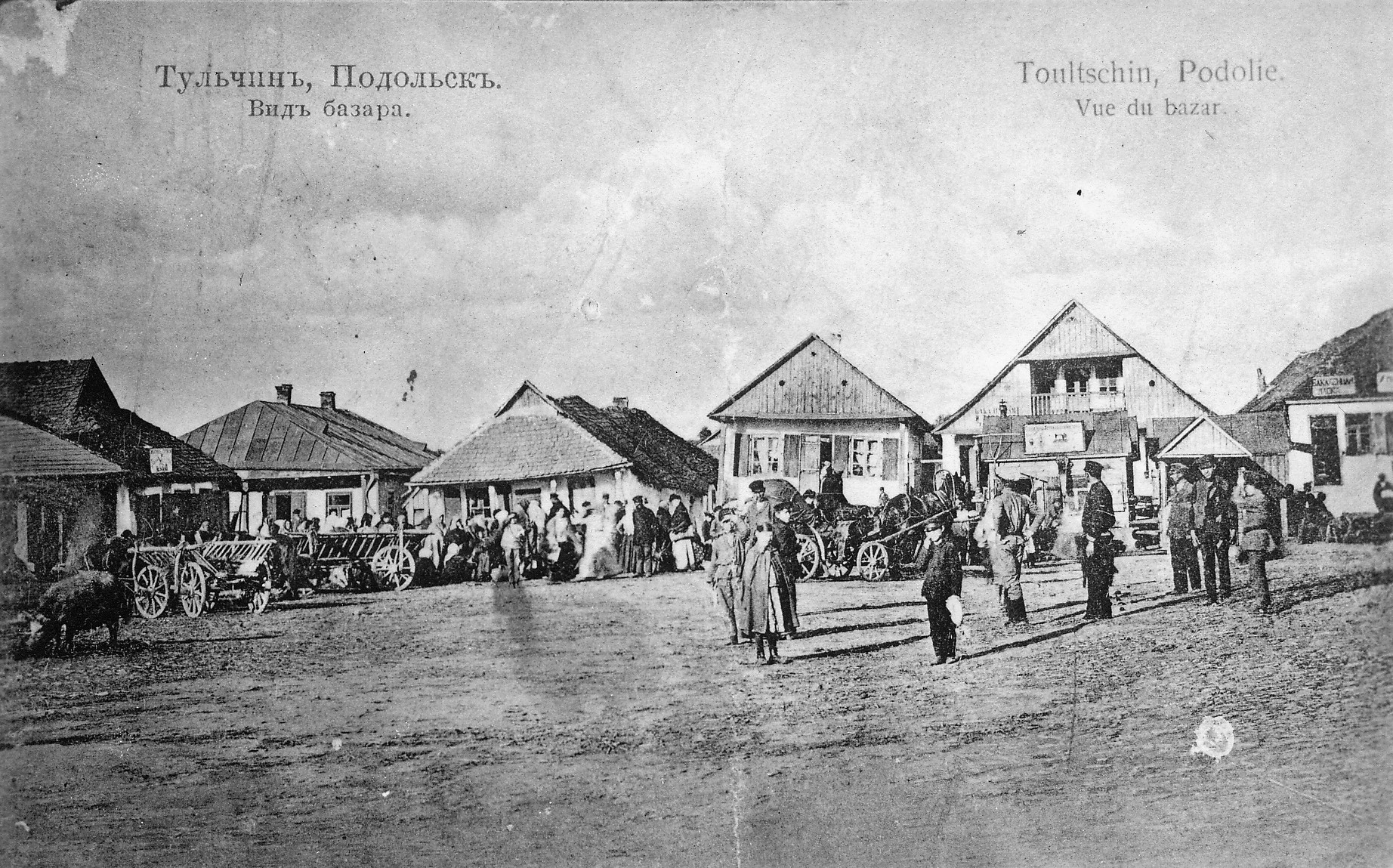
Tulchyn, from a photograph of 1908

Leontovych's move to Tulchyn marked the beginning of a prolific period of composing. There, he taught vocal and instrumental music at the Tulchyn Eparchy Women's College to the daughters of village priests. He developed a lasting friendship with the composer Kyrylo Stetsenko, who went on to influence his musical style. Stetsenko praised his friend's compositions, saying, "Leontovych is a famous music expert from Podolia. He recorded many folk songs... These songs are harmonised for mixed choir. These harmonisations have revealed the author to be a great expert of both choral singing and theoretical studies". Leontovych's choir performed works by Russian composers Mikhail Glinka, Alexey Verstovsky, and Pyotr Ilyich Tchaikovsky, as well as music by Stetsenko, Lysenko, and Nishchynsky.

From 1909, Leontovych studied under the musicologist Boleslav Yavorsky, whom he was to visit in Moscow and Kyiv over the next 12 years. He became involved with the theatrical music scene in Tulchyn, and took charge of the local branch of the Prosvita, a Ukrainian society dedicated to preserving and developing its culture and education.

Leontovych wrote choral arrangements of Ukrainian folk songs, including Piyutʹ pivni (The Roosters are Singing) In 1914, Stetsenko convinced Leontovych to have his music performed by the student choir of the Kyiv University under the leadership of Alexander Koshetz. In December 1916, the performance of his arrangement of "Shchedryk" brought Leontovych great success amongst Kyiv's music lovers.

=== Career in Kyiv ===
During the October Revolution and the establishment of the Ukrainian People's Republic in 1918, Leontovych relocated without his family to Kyiv, where he was active as both a conductor and a composer. Several of his pieces gained popularity among professional and amateurs groups alike, who added them to their repertoire. At one of the concerts, Leontovych's arrangement of the Mykola Voronyi's Legend was deemed a success. After the arrival of the Bolsheviks, Leontovych worked in the music committee of the People's Commissariat of Education, and taught at the Music and Drama Institute, and, together with the composer and conductor Hryhoriy Veryovka, was employed to produce preschool education courses, and organise choir groups. During this period, he taught choral conducting at the Kyiv Conservatory. He participated in the founding of the Ukrainian Republic Capella of which he was the commissioner.

When Kyiv was captured by the White Army on 31 August 1919, the authorities began to persecute the city's Ukrainian intelligentsia. To avoid being arrested, Leontovych returned to Tulchyn. Upon his return to Tulchyn with his family, Leontovych started the city's first music school, since the college where he had worked was closed down by the Bolsheviks. He began to work on an opera, Na Rusalchyn Velykden ("The Mermaid's Easter"), based on the fairy tale by Borys Hrinchenko.

=== Death ===
Early in the morning of 23 January 1921, Leontovych was staying at the home of his parents, whom he was visiting for the Eastern Orthodox Feast of the Nativity. An undercover chekist (Soviet state security agent), Afanasy Hrishchenko, had asked to stay the night at the house, and he shared a room with Leontovych. At 7.30 in the morning Hrishchenko shot the composer, and robbed the family. By the time a doctor arrived, Leontovych had already died of blood loss.

== Music ==
=== Works ===
"Viruyu"
A 30-second sample of "Viruyu" (Credo) from Leontovych's Divine Liturgy of St. John Chrysostom

Leontovych specialised in a cappella music, and composed over 150 compositions, generally inspired by Ukrainian folk songs. These include artistic arrangements of folk songs, religious works (including his liturgy), cantatas, and songs set to the words of Ukrainian poets. His best known compositions are the shchedrivka (New Year's song) "Shchedryk" and "Dudaryk" (the duda player). His music features rich harmony, vocal polyphony, and imitation. His earlier arrangements of folk songs were primarily strophic arrangements of the melody. As he gained more experience, the structure of his compositions and arrangements of folk songs became strongly connected with the text.

Leontovych's theological background allowed him to maintain contact with the newly recognised Ukrainian Autocephalous Orthodox Church, which was re-established in 1918. His output during this period was rich in new sacred music, following the examples of his close friend Stetsenko—who was also a priest and a composer—and Koshetz. Leontovych's works form this time included На воскресіння Христа (On the Resurrection of Christ), Хваліте ім’я Господнє (Praise ye the Name of the Lord), and Світе тихий (Oh Quiet Light), among others. His Liturgy of St. John Chrysostom, a milestone in the development of Ukrainian spiritual music, was first performed in the St. Nicholas Military Cathedral at the Kyiv, Pechersk on 22 May 1919.

Mykola Leontovych was highly critical of himself. According to his first biographer Oles' Chapkivskyi, a contemporary of the composer, Leontovych would sometimes work on one choral setting for up to four years before letting anyone else see it. His "First collection of songs from Polissia" remained unpublished. "The Second Collection of Songs from Polissia" which he dedicated to Lysenko, (Note: Lysenko was one of Leontovych's largest influences. Leontovych, who had admired his music since his student days, would perform it in concerts wherever he worked.) was published in 1903. Dissatisfied with the work, Leontovych bought up all 300 published copies and had them destroyed.

Leontovych commenced work on an opera Na rusalchyn velykden (On the Water Nymph's Easter), based on Ukrainian myths and the works of Hrinchenko. By the end of 1920, he had finished the first of three acts, but he was murdered before he could complete the opera. Attempts to complete and edit the work were made by the Ukrainian composer Mykhailo Verykivsky. The Ukrainian composer Myroslav Skoryk and the poet Diodor Bobyr collaborated to turn the unfinished opera into a one-act operetta, which premiered in 1977 at the Kyiv State Opera and Ballet Theatre, 100 years after Leontovych's birth. The North American premiere was held in Toronto on 11 April 2003.

=== "Shchedryk" ===
"Shchedryk"
A recording of "Shchedryk", with the original words in Ukrainian, performed by the "Ukrainian National Choir" (Ukrainian Republic Capella) in New York in 1922

Mykola Leontovych's song "Shchedryk" is his best-known piece. "Shchedryk" is generally said to have been first performed on 25 December 1916, at St. Volodymyr's Kyiv University. However, it was first performed on 29 December 1916 in the Kyiv Merchants' Assembly Hall, now part of the National Philharmonic of Ukraine.

The Ukrainian National Choir's performance of "Shchedryk" during a tour of Europe in 1920/21. caused the song to become popular worldwide. The first recording was made in New York in October 1922 by Brunswick Records.

==== "Carol of the Bells" ====
"Shchedryk" was performed during a concert in Carnegie Hall, where the American composer and conductor Peter J Wilhousky heard it. In 1936, he published the song to Leontovych's music as a Christmas carol, with his own text in English that bears no resemblance to the original Ukrainian words of the song. The English version, known as "Carol of the Bells", has been arranged over 150 times since 2004.

The carol is one of the 25 most frequently performed Christmas songs of the 20th century. As listed by the American Society of Composers, Authors and Publishers (ASCAP), it ranked number 15.

=== Reception and popularity ===
Leontovych's best critic was his friend, and fellow priest and composer Stetsenko, who described him as "a great expert of both choral singing and theoretical studies". He convinced Leontovych to publish his music and have it performed by Kyiv University students.

"Shchedryk"'s success led to Leontovych becoming popular in Kyiv with music specialists and fans of choral music alike. At the Kyiv Conservatory, Yavorsky reacted positively to his new works. During a concert, Leontovych's Lehenda, set to lyrics by Voronyi, gained great popularity. After reviewing the composer's Second Compilation of Songs from Podolia, Lysenko wrote:

Leontovych has an original, illustrious gift. In his arrangements I found separate passages, movement of voices, which later developed in an ingeniously weaved musical network.

The increase in popularity of Leontovych's music was aided by the head of the Ukrainian National Republic, Symon Petliura, who created and sponsored two choirs to promote awareness of the culture of Ukraine. Stetsenko's choir toured across Ukraine, while the Koshetz's Ukrainian Republic Capella toured Europe and the Americas. Performances by the Ukrainian Republic Capella made Leontovych known throughout the western world—in France, Leontovych earned the nickname, "Ukrainian Bach". On 5 October 1921, the Capella performed "Shchedryk" in the Carnegie Hall.

Leontovych's music is currently performed mostly in Ukraine, and few recordings are dedicated exclusively to him.

The Ukrainian diaspora remember him and perform his works. The Canadian Oleksandr Koshyts Choir, based in Winnipeg, performs music by Leontovych and other Ukrainian composers, and has made a recording of his works.

== Commemoration ==
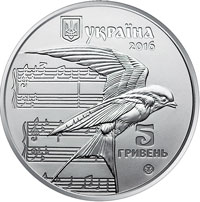
A commemorative coin depicting "Shchedryk"

On 1 February 1921, nine days after Leontovych's death, artists, academics, and students of the Mykola Lysenko Institute of Music and Drama in Kyiv gathered to commemorate him. They established the Committee for the Memory of Mykola Leontovych, which later became the Leontovych Music Society, and which promoted Ukrainian music until 1928. The Leontovych Bandurist Capella was a male choir whose members accompanied themselves using a Ukrainian bandura. The choir was established in a displaced persons camps in Germany in 1946, and continued until 1949.

The Vinnytsia College of Arts and Culture is named after Leontovych. There is a memorial museum dedicated to the composer in Tulchyn, and another was established in 1977 in the village of Markivka, where he was buried. The museum was rebuilt after the premises became dilapidated. It reopened in 2016. In 2018, a statue of the composer was unveiled in Pokrovsk.

In 2002, to celebrate the 125th anniversary of the composer's birth, the city of Kamianets-Podilskyi held an all-Ukrainian conference "Mykola Leontovych and Modern Education and Science," with guests from the Ministry of Education and Science of Ukraine and the National Union of Composers of Ukraine. During this event, the city unveiled a memorial plaque to the composer, next to the old building formerly used by the Podollia Theological Seminary.

== Sources ==
- Crump, William D. (2013). The Christmas Encyclopedia (3rd ed.). Jefferson, North Carolina: McFarland & Company, Inc. p. 62. ISBN 978-07864-6-827-0.
- Dutchak, Violetta; Kubik, Olha (2021). "Cпецифіка розвитку бандурного ансамблевого мистецтва в середовищі української діаспори хх – початку ххі століття" [The specificity of the development of bandura orchestral art in the Ukrainian diaspora environment of the 20th – early 21st centuries]. Knowledge, Education, Law, Management (in Ukrainian). 38 (2): 77–85. ISSN 2353-8406.
- Kuzyk, Valentyna, ed. (2019). Микола Леонтович: Хорові Твори [Mykola Leontovych: Choral Works] (PDF) (in Ukrainian and English). Kyiv: Muzychna Ukraina.
- Malko, Victoria A. (2021). The Ukrainian Intelligentsia and Genocide: the struggle for history, language, and culture in the 1920s and 1930s. London: Lexington Books. ISBN 978-14985-9-679-4.
- Sizova, Ninel (2018). "Діяльність миколи леонтовича в галузі професіоналізації хорового життя вінниччини початку хх століття" [Activities of Mykola Leontovych in the field professionalising choral life in Vinnichchina at the beginning of the 20th century] (PDF). Current Issues of Humanitarian Sciences (in Ukrainian). 2 (19). Vinnytsia, Ukraine: Vinnytsia State Pedagogical University: 45–50. doi:10.24919/2308-4863.2/19.167751. ISSN 2308-4863. S2CID 202968221. (link to HTML version of the file).
- Vysotska, Kateryna (2019). Brodz, Olena; Koshelnyk, Maryna (eds.). "Микола Леонтович: музична легенда Поділля" [Mykola Leontovych: a musical legend of Podillia] (PDF). Materials of the Scientific and Practical Conference for the 140th Anniversary of the Birth of M. D. Leontovich, December 13, 2017 (in Ukrainian). Vinnytsia, Ukraine: Vinnytsia Regional Museum of Local Lore. (English text version)
- Zavalnuik, Anatoliĭ (2007). Микола Леонтович. Листи, документи, духовні твори [Mykola Leontovych. Letters, documents, spiritual works] (in Russian and Ukrainian). Vinnytsia, Ukraine: Vinnytsia State Pedagogical University. ISBN 978-96638-2-085-9.
