= Anatoly Avdievsky =

Ukrainian conductor and composer (1933–2016)

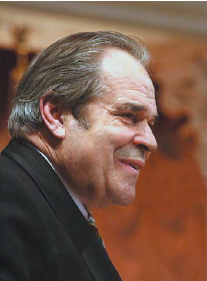

Anatoly Avdievsky (Ukrainian: Анатолій Тимофійович Авдієвський; 16 August 1933 – 14 March 2016) was a Ukrainian choir conductor mostly known as the long-term manager of The Veryovka Ukrainian Folk Choir.

== Biography ==
Anatoly Avdievsky was born in the village of Fedvar, Kirovohrad Oblast (now called Pidlisne). In 1940-1948 he studied at a secondary school in Tsebrykovo. From 1948 to 1953, he was a student at the Odesa State Music School, and from 1953 to 1958 he studied at the Odesa Conservatory.

From 1958 to 1963, he was the founder, artistic director and chief conductor of the Polissya Song and Dance Ensemble "Lyonok" (Zhytomyr). From 1963 to 1966 he was the artistic director and chief conductor of the Cherkasy Ukrainian Folk Choir.

Since 1966 until his death he was the director, artistic director and chief conductor of The Veryovka Ukrainian Folk Choir. At the same time he was a lecturer at the Kyiv Conservatory (1971-1976), at the Kyiv Institute of Culture (1977-1980), and at the Kyiv Pedagogical Institute (since 1980, since 1986 - professor).

Since 1991 Avdievsky was a Chairman of the All-Ukrainian Music Union. Since 1995 - President of the National Music Committee of Ukraine of the International Council of UNESCO. Since 2000 - Vice-Rector - Director of the Institute of Arts of the National Pedagogical University.

He died on March 24, 2016, and is buried in Kyiv at Baikove Cemetery.

Also Avdievsky was an author of original choral works ("Over the wide Dnieper", "Flowers, Ukraine", "Clear Moon" on the poems of V. Lagoda, O. Novitsky, Lesya Ukrainka), arrangements of Ukrainian songs and songs of the peoples of the world (Polish, Czech, Spanish, Brazilian, Korean, etc.), songs to the words of T. Shevchenko, canonical works.

== Awards ==
- Hero of Ukraine (2003)
- Shevchenko National Prize (1968)
- People's Artist of Ukraine (1975)
