= Andrey Vitruk =

Soviet military officer (1902–1946)

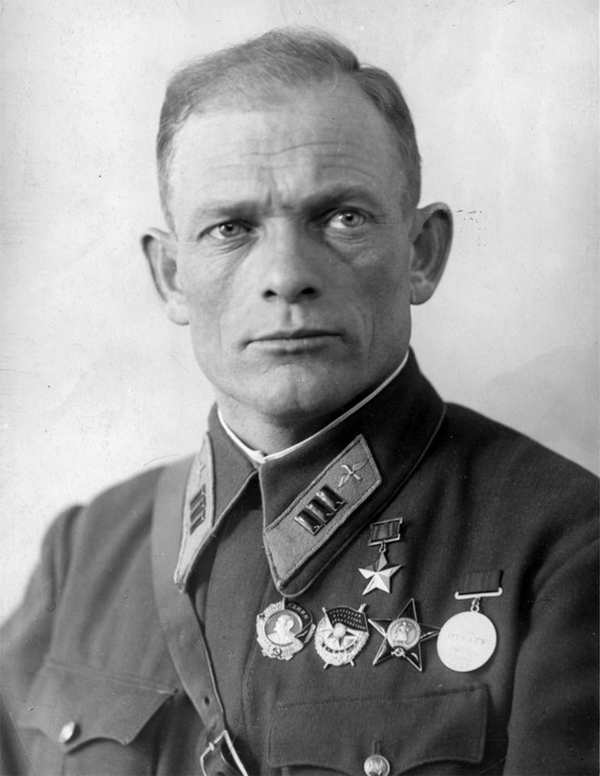
- Born: July 2, 1902; Andrushki, Russian Empire
- Died: June 1, 1946 (aged 43); Kyiv, Ukrainian SSR, Soviet Union
- Burial place: Park of Eternal Glory
- Military career
- Allegiance: Soviet Union
- Branch: Soviet Air Forces
- Rank: Major General
- Conflicts: Second World War

Andrey Nikiforovich Vitruk (Russian: Андре́й Ники́форович Витру́к; 7 July 1902 – 1 June 1946) was a Soviet military officer, a Major General of the Soviet Air Forces and a Hero of the Soviet Union.

== Early life ==
Vitruk was born July 7, 1902, in Andrushki near Zhytomir, then in Russian Empire, to a Ukrainian peasant family. He graduated from a local school and became a worker in a sugar factory. Following the Russian Civil War, in 1924 he joined the Red Army and graduated from a school of artillery. In 1934 he received further training at the Borisoglebsk Military Aviation School. As a pilot of fighter-bombers he took part in the Khalkhin-Gol battles against Japan and in the German and Soviet Invasion of Poland in 1939. Until 1940 he also served on the Finnish front during the Winter War.

== Career ==
In 1941 he received officer's training in the Military Aviation Academy and became the commanding officer of the Soviet 65th Air Regiment of the Leningrad Military District. On that post he remained until the beginning of the German invasion of the Soviet Union. On July 6, 1941, although wounded in action, Vitruk remained on duty and was promoted to the rank of Lt. Colonel. He commanded his regiment during the transfer of equipment from the outdated Polikarpov I-15bis to the new Ilyushin Il-2. Following the transfer and training of the crews the regiment was divided and Vitruk continued to command one of its parts. In October 1941 it was transferred to the Western Front near Moscow. By early 1942 he accomplished his 21st sortie, without any successes. However, for his superb command of the regiment on February 24, 1942, he was awarded with the title of the Hero of the Soviet Union.

In July 1942 Vitruk became the commanding officer of the 291st Division, later transformed into the 10th Guards Division of the VVS. On that post he commanded his unit during the battles of Voronezh, Kiev, Târgul Frumos and the Iassy-Chisinau operation. Later on he took part in the battles leading to the Soviet capture of Ploiești, Bucharest and Craiova in Romania, as well as Belgrade in Yugoslavia and Székesfehérvár in Hungary. For his actions during the Yugoslavian campaign he was awarded with the title of the Hero of Yugoslavia.

== Death ==
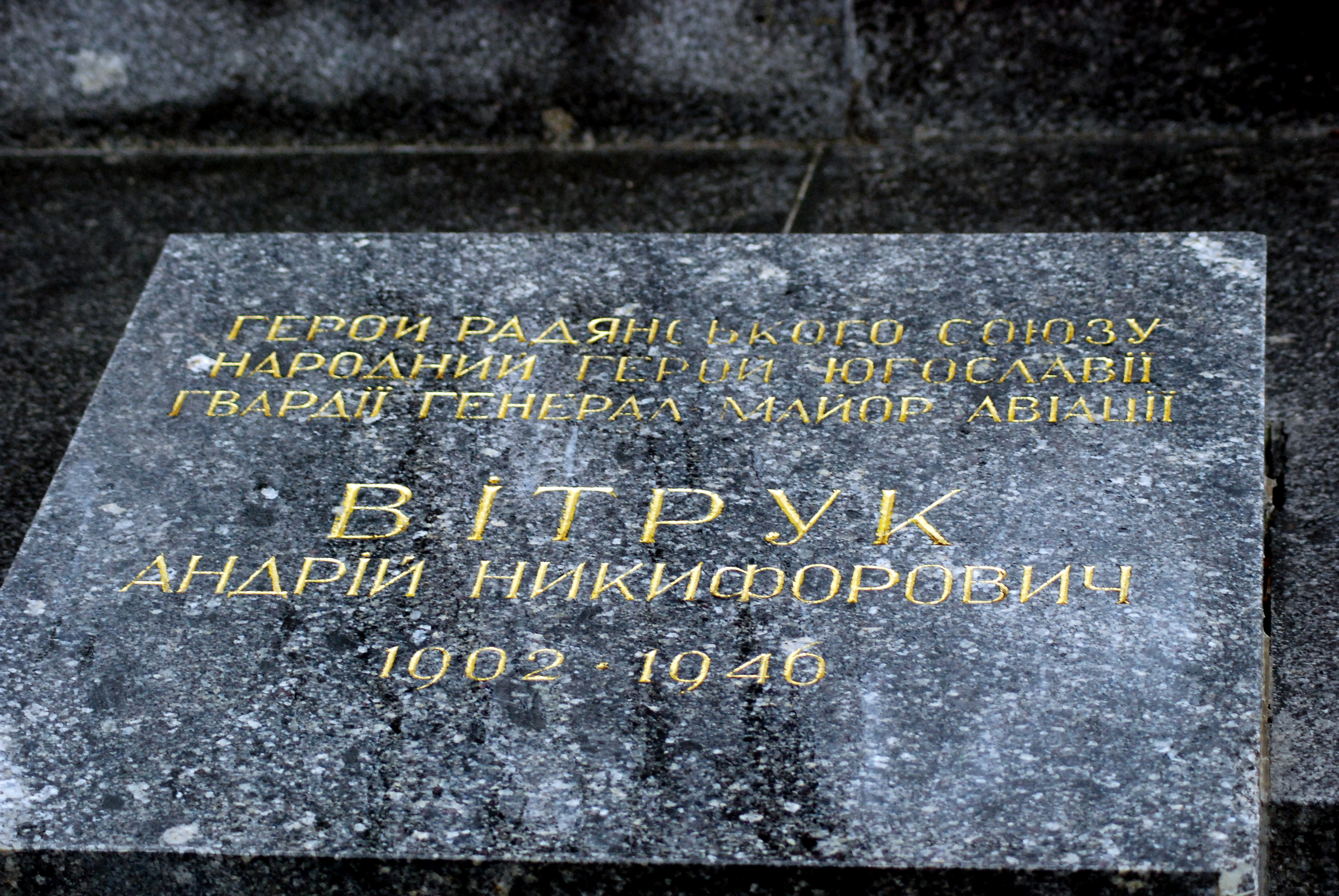
Vitruk's cenotaph in Kyiv

He died of a serious disease on June 1, 1946, and was buried in Kyiv at the Park of Eternal Glory.

== Awards ==
- Hero of the Soviet Union
- Order of Lenin
- Order of the Red Banner, four times
- Order of Suvorov, 2nd class
- Order of Kutuzov, 2nd class
- Order of Bogdan Khmelnitsky, 2nd class
- Order of Alexander Nevsky
- Order of the Red Star
- Order of the National Hero of Yugoslavia
