= Sribne =

Rural locality in Chernihiv Oblast, Ukraine

Sribne Срібне
- Rural settlement
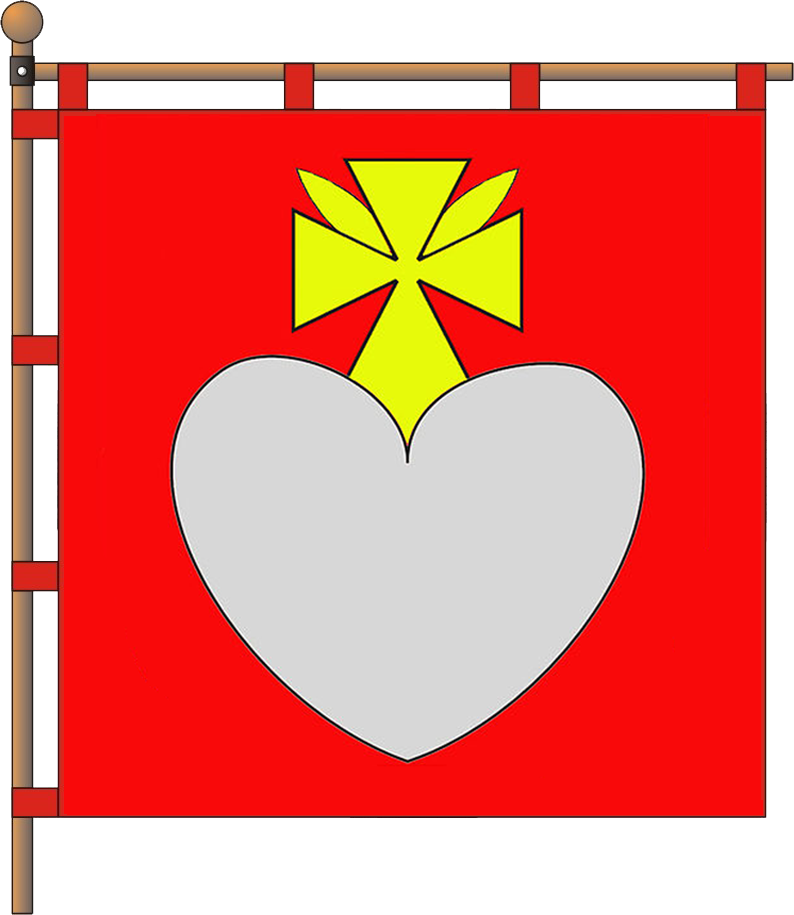
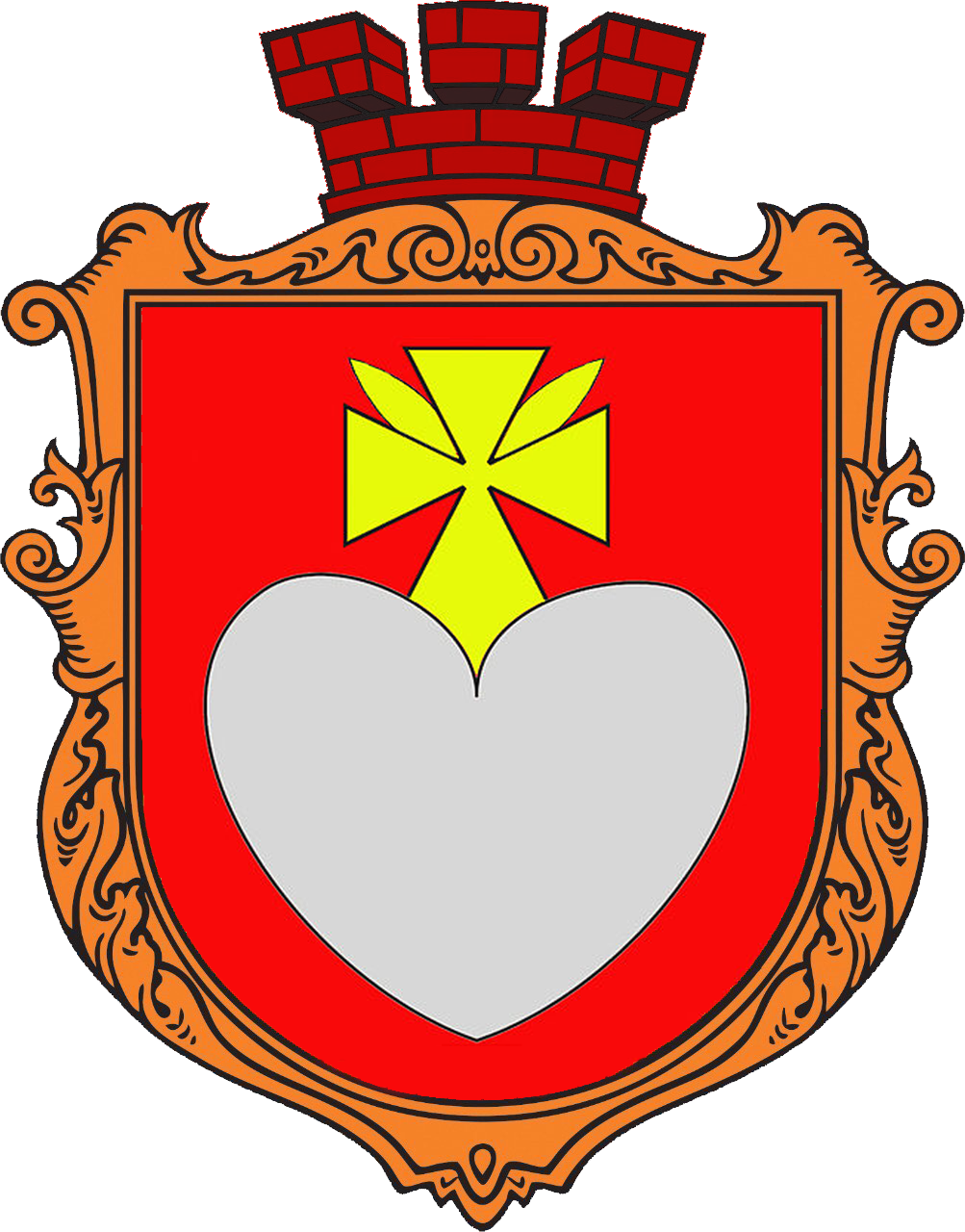
- Flag Coat of arms

- Location within Chernihiv Oblast Location within Ukraine
- Coordinates: 50°39′45″N 32°55′02″E
- Country: Ukraine
- Oblast: Chernihiv Oblast
- Raion: Pryluky Raion

Population (2022)
  - Total: 3,001
- Time zone: UTC+2 (EET)
  - Summer (DST): UTC+3 (EEST)

Sribne (Ukrainian: Срібне) is a rural settlement in Pryluky Raion, Chernihiv Oblast, northern Ukraine. The Sribne is located in the east of Pryluky raion, within the Dnieper Lowland. It hosts the administration of Sribne settlement hromada, one of the hromadas of Ukraine. Population: 3,001 (2022 estimate).

== History ==
Until 18 July 2020, Sribne was the administrative center of Sribne Raion. The raion was abolished in July 2020 as part of the administrative reform of Ukraine, which reduced the number of raions of Chernihiv Oblast to five. The area of Sribne Raion was merged into Pryluky Raion.

Until 26 January 2024, Sribne was designated urban-type settlement. On this day, a new law entered into force which abolished this status, and Sribne became a rural settlement.

== Geography ==
The Sribne is located in the east of Pryluky raion. The distance from the settlement to Chernihiv is about 230 km. The territory of the Sribne is located within the Dnieper Lowland. The relief of the settlement's surface is a lowland plain, in places dissected by river valleys. The Udai (Sula basin) and its tributaries flow through the Silver, and there are many ponds.

The climate of Sribne is moderately continental, with warm summers and relatively mild winters. The average temperature in January is about -7 °C, and in July - +19 °C. The average annual precipitation ranges from 550 to 660 mm, with the highest amount of precipitation in the summer period.

The soil cover of the Sribne is dominated by chernozem and podzolized soils. The hromada is located the forest steppe, on the Polesia. The main species in the forests are pine, oak, alder, ash, and birch.

== Economy ==
The leading sectors of the Sribne economy are agriculture and food industry. There is a dairy factory in the village of Sribne.

=== Transportation ===
The nearest railway stations are in Pryluky (43 km) and Romny (44 km). The national highway H07 Kyiv-Sumy-Yunakivka passes in the north of the village.
