= Museum of Theatre, Music and Cinema Arts of Ukraine =

Coordinates: 50°26′07″N 30°33′17″E

- Музей театрального, музичного та кіномистецтва України
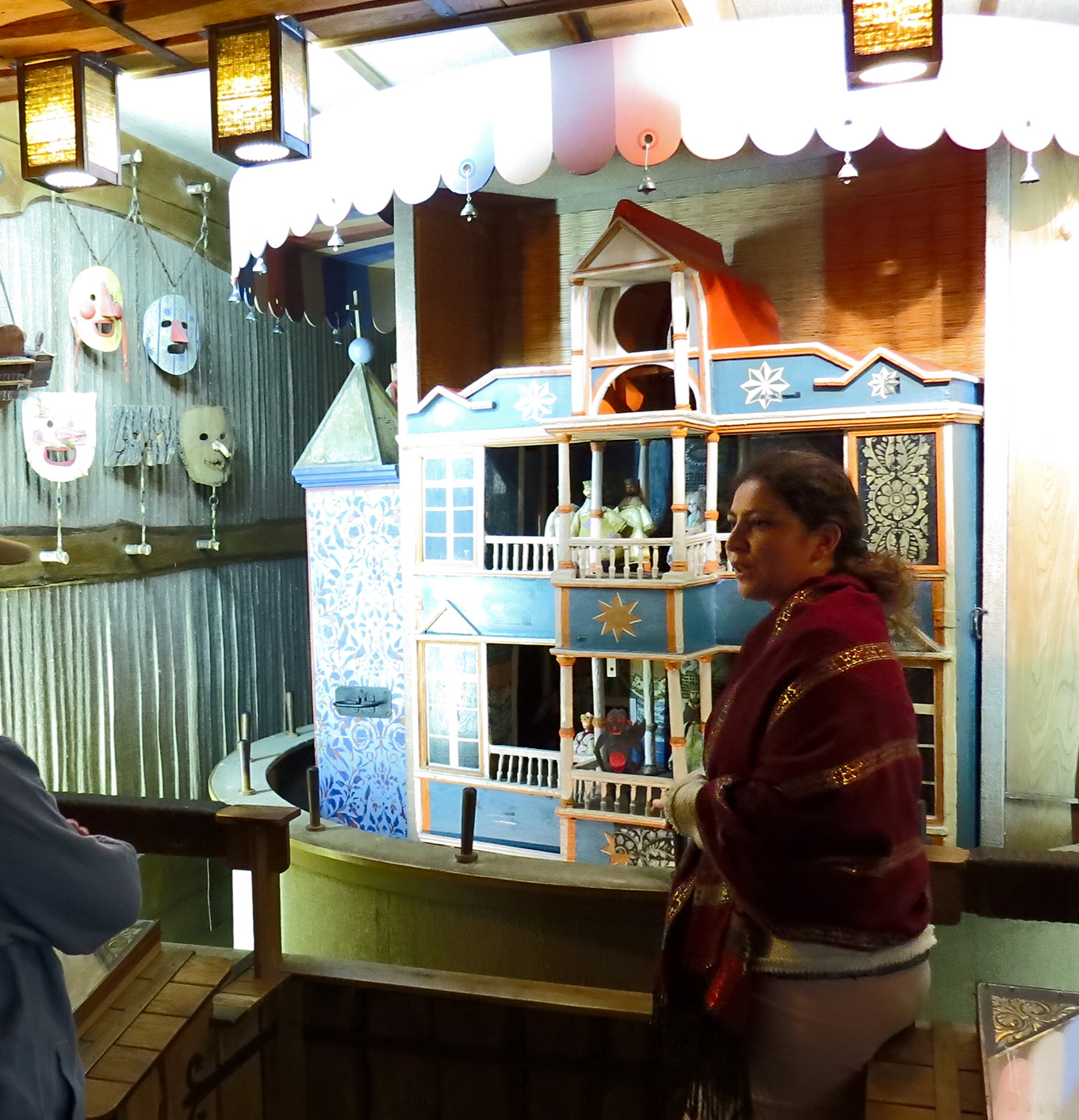
- Established: 1923
- Location: Lavrska str., 21, building 26, Kyiv, Ukraine
- Type: History museum
- Website: https://www.tmf-museum.com/

The Museum of Theatre, Music and Cinema Arts of Ukraine is a museum in Kyiv chronicling the history of Ukrainian performing arts. It was founded in 1923 as part of Les Kurbas's Berezil Theatre. It holds costumes, puppets, and musical instruments. Its collection of theater-related art includes works by Alexandra Exter, Vadym Meller, Anatol Petrytsky, and Alexander Khvostenko-Khvostov.
