= Hryhoriy Veryovka =

Ukrainian composer

Hryhoriy Veryovka Григорій Верьовка PAUkrSSR, Shevchenko National Prize laureate
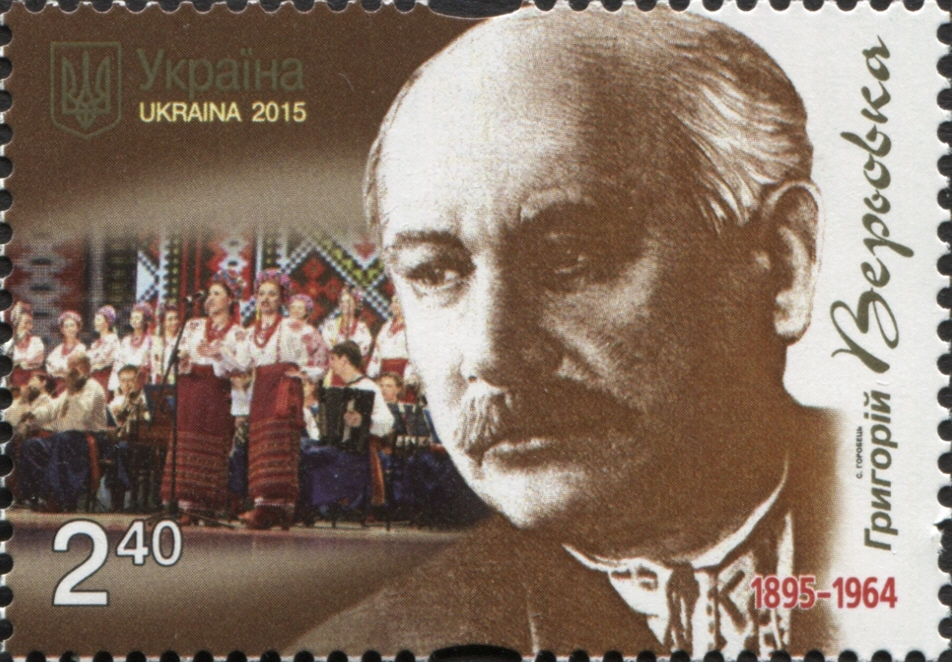
- Veryovka on a 2015 Ukrainian stamp

Background information
- Born: 25 December 1895 [O.S. 13 December] Berezna, Chernigov Governorate, Russian Empire (present-day Ukraine)
- Died: 21 October 1964 (aged 68) Kiev, Ukrainian SSR, Soviet Union
- Genre: Classical
- Occupations: Composer; Choir director
- Spouse: Eleonora Pavlivna Skrypchynska

Hryhoriy Huriyovych Veryovka (Note: Ukrainian: Григорій Гурійович Верьовка, romanized: Hryhorii Huriiovych Verovka; Russian: Григорий Гурьевич Верёвка, romanized: Grigory Guryevich Veryovka) (25 December 1895 [O.S. 13 December] – 21 October 1964) was a Soviet and Ukrainian composer and choir director.

He is best known for founding the renowned Veryovka Choir in 1943, and leading it for many years, gaining international recognition and winning multiple awards. Veryovka was also a professor of conducting at the Kyiv Conservatory, where he worked alongside faculty including Boleslav Yavorsky, Alexander Koshetz, Mykola Leontovych, and Mykhailo Verykivsky.

== Career ==
Veryovka was born in an old Cossack town of Berezna (today urban-type settlement). In 1916 he graduated from the Chernihiv Theological Seminary. He was the son of a peasant-craftsman who was the regent of a church choir and also played the violin. His mother was also involved in music, and performed many songs in the Ukrainian language. He was their sixth child.

After attending a local three-year zemstvo school, he began attending the Chernihiv Theological Seminary, where he played various musical instruments and sang in the church choir. However, he soon transferred in 1918, entering instead the Lysenko Music and Drama School (a predecessor of the Kyiv Conservatory), studying the theory of composition. At the school, he helped found several amateur choral ensembles. In 1933 he received an external degree from the institute.

In 1923, he began to work as the choral conductor at his alma mater until 1927, and he also worked at the First Kyiv Music College and at the Ukrainian Republican Philharmonic. In addition, he was head of the new music school in Kyiv named after M. Leontovych in 1925. Right before the outbreak of World War II, he was working as the conductor of the choir for the Bilshovyk factory in Kyiv and returned to teaching at the Kyiv Conservatory.

During World War II in 1941–45 he was a scientist of the Rylsky Institute of Art Studies, Folklore and Ethnology. He also taught at the Baskhir branch of the Moscow Conservatory from 1941 to 1943. In 1943, in Kharkiv, Veryovka organized his well-known choir, the Veryovka Choir, and, until his death, was its art director and its main conductor. In 1946, he formally became a member of the Communist Party of Ukraine. The first concert of the choir took place in August 1944 following the liberation of Kyiv, and it later made its first international tour in 1952 in Romania. Under his leadership, in 1959 the World Peace Council awarded the choir a silver medal, with Veryovka himself being awarded a World Peace Council citation. In addition, from 1948 to 1952 he headed the National Union of Composers of Ukraine.

Upon his death in 1964 he was buried in Baikove Cemetery in Kyiv, and in 1967 a monument was erected at the site of his burial in his honor. In addition, in 1970, a memorial plaque was unveiled on the building where he lived in Kyiv, 5 Lva Tolstoho Street, which was sculpted by E. Fridman.

== Awards and honors ==
- He was awarded the Stalin Prize in 1948.
- He was awarded the People's Artist of the Ukrainian SSR in 1960.
- He was awarded the Shevchenko National Prize in 1968.
- There are streets named after him in Kyiv and Bucha.

== Notes ==
Cultural offices
Preceded by Levko Revutsky	Head of the National Union of Composers of Ukraine; 1948–1952	Succeeded by Pylyp Kozytskiy
