= Veryovka Ukrainian Folk Choir =

Ukrainian folk choir

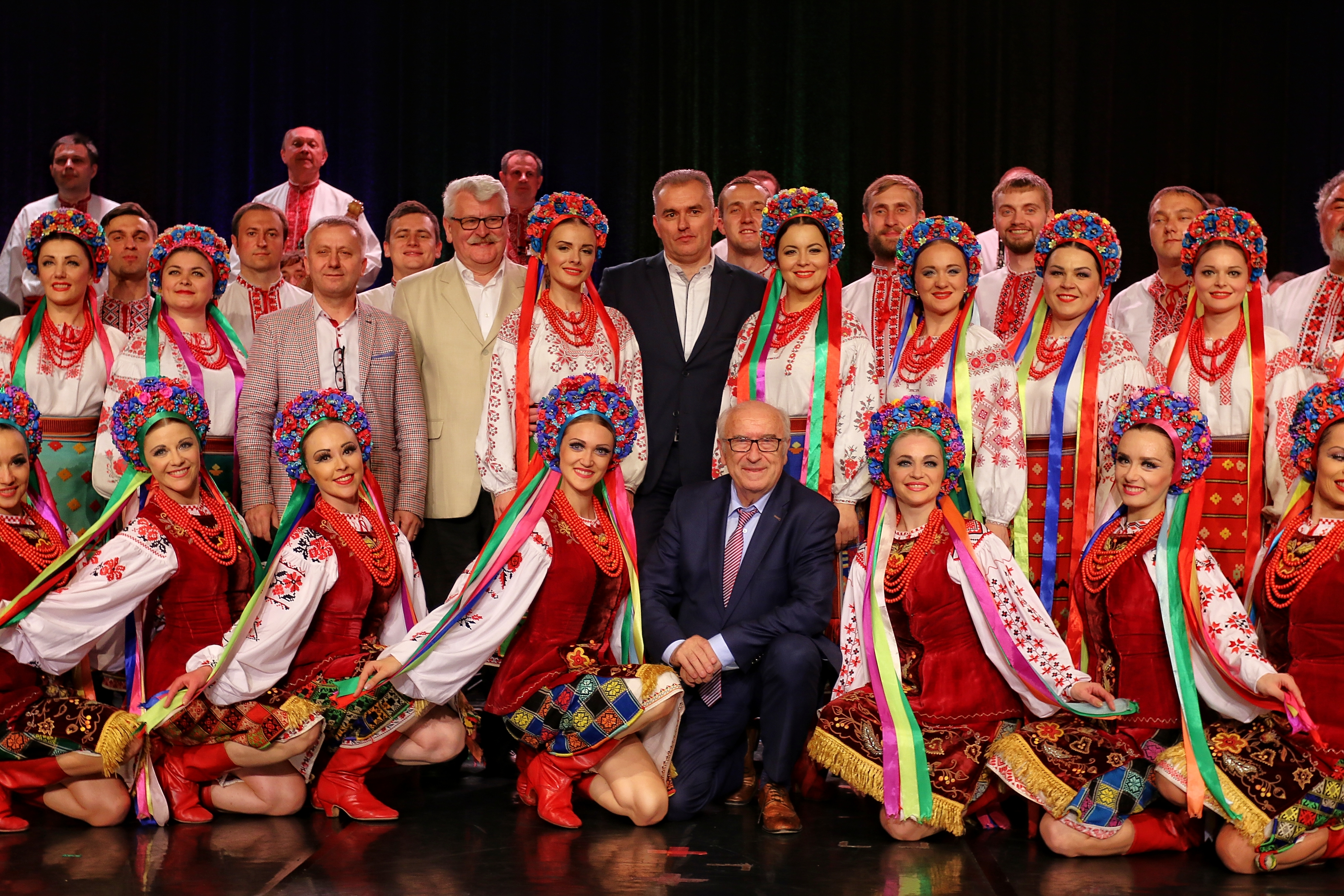
The Veryovka Ukrainian Folk Choir in 2018

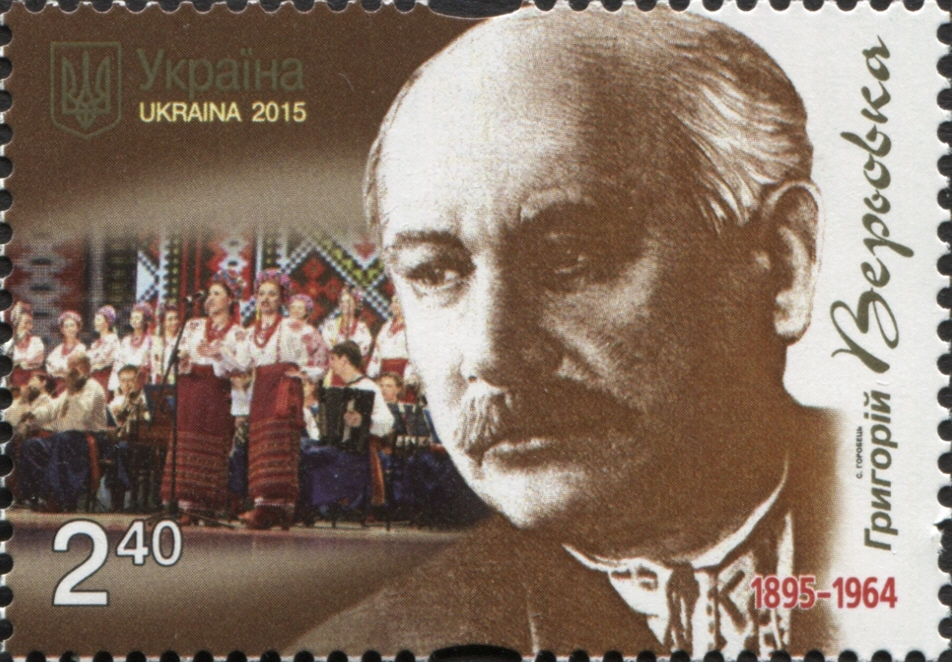
Hryhoriy Veryovka, the founder of the ensemble, depicted in a stamp, 2015

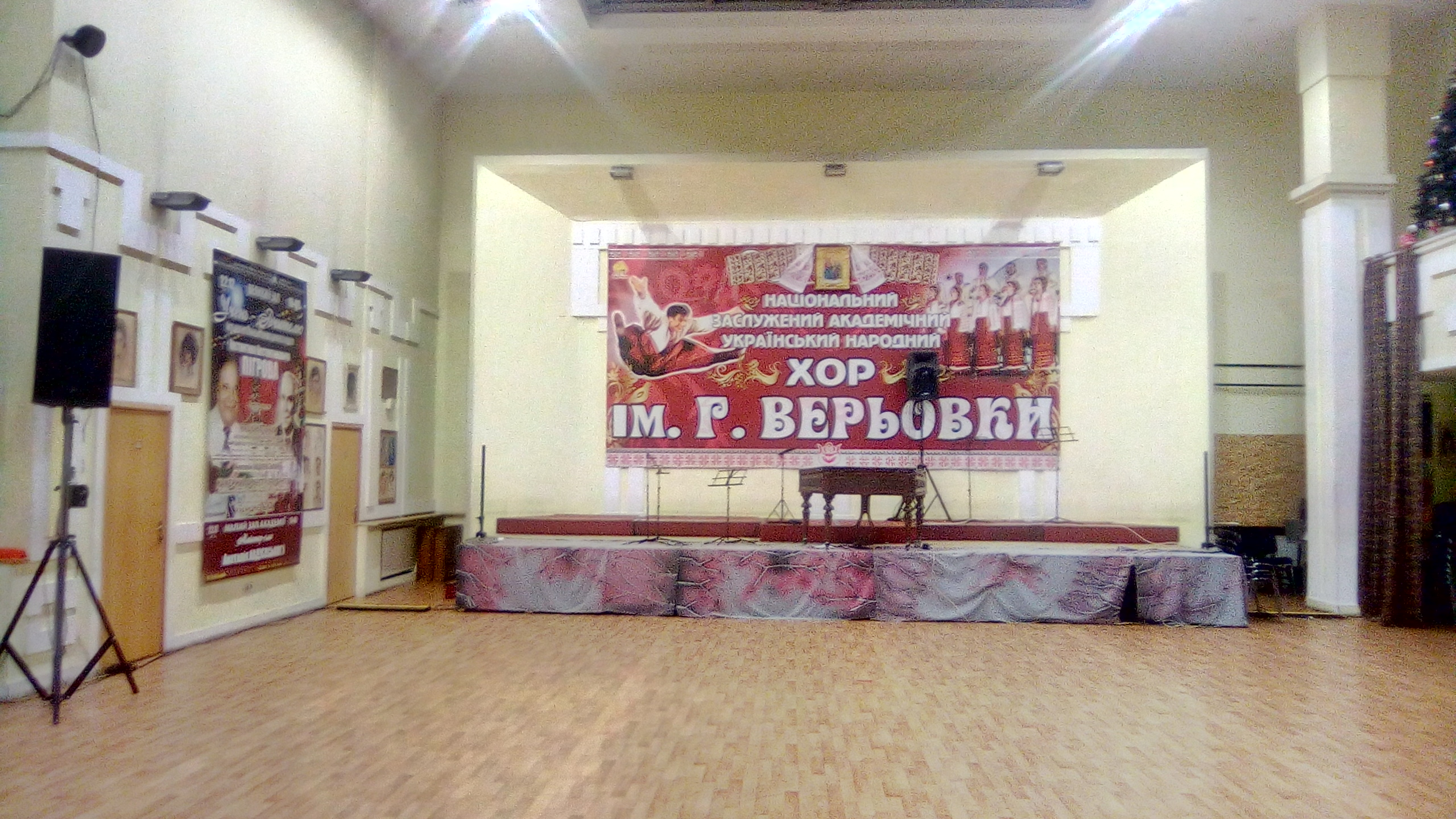
The rehearsal base of the Veryovka choir in Kyiv

The Veryovka Ukrainian Folk Choir (fully titled in Ukrainian: Національний заслужений академічний український народний хор України імені Григорія Верьовки) is a professional Ukrainian ensemble founded in 1943.

The choir was founded in 1943 in Kharkiv to promote and spread Ukrainian folk music and dance traditions. The initiator and the first leader of the choir was Hryhoriy Veryovka, researcher and choir conductor. The choir represented Ukrainian art in the cities of the USSR, Romania (1952, 1956), Poland (1953), Finland (1954), Belgium and Luxembourg (1958), Germany (1959), Yugoslavia (1962) and other countries. In honor of its founder, the choir was named after him in 1965. In the same year, the team was headed by Anatoly Avdievsky. In 1965 the choir was awarded the title "deserved", in 1974 the title "academic" was granted and in 1997 granted the status of "national".

The repertoire of the ensemble is based on Ukrainian folklore, songs and dances of other nations. In Soviet period songs devoted to Communist party also were present in their repertoire. In 2011, remarkable was a premiere performance of the folk-opera "When the fern blooms" by Yevhen Stankovych, forbidden in Soviet time. The ensemble consists of 158 people including not only singers but also orchestral and choreographic groups.

Since Avdievsky's death in 2016, the leader of the ensemble has been Zenoviy Korinets.

The Veryovka Choir has toured in Mexico, Canada, France, Switzerland, Russia, Belarus, Poland, Germany, The United States and a number of other countries, and has traditionally participated in major Ukrainian state events. The choir has received many national and international awards, in particular for the contribution to peace and friendship between peoples; it was awarded a silver medal World Peace Council. In 2019, a full-length film about the choir was shot.

In 2019 The Veryovka Choir among with Kvartal 95 Studio released a video clip featuring "Horila sosna, palala" (Ukrainian: Горіла сосна, палала, lit. 'The pine burned, blazed') which mocked Valeria Hontareva, former Chairwoman of the National Bank of Ukraine, whose house was just burned in London. The incident sparked public anger. Later, Volodymyr Borodyanski, minister of culture of Ukraine apologized to Hontareva and stated that “the law does not prohibit moral perversions”.

The 2022 Pink Floyd single "Hey, Hey, Rise Up!" opens with a sample from a recording by the choir of the 1914 anthem "Oh, the Red Viburnum in the Meadow" (Ukrainian: Ой у лузі червона калина) by the choir.

== Members ==
- Yevchenko Kasyan a Ukrainian musician joined the choir in 1950.
- Singer Alla Kudlai joined the choir in 1978.
- In March 2022, member Hennadiy Pavlyk died.
