= Sribne settlement hromada =

Sribne settlement hromada Срібнянська селищна громада
- Hromada
- Interactive map of Sribne settlement hromada
- Country: Ukraine
- Oblast: Chernihiv
- Raion: Pryluky

Area
  - Total: 578.0 km^{2} (223.2 sq mi)

Population (2020)
  - Total: 10,519
  - Density: 18.20/km^{2} (47.14/sq mi)
- CATOTTG code: UA74080150000033167
- Settlements: 29
- Rural settlements: 2
- Villages: 27
- Website: sribne-otg.cg.gov.ua

Sribne settlement hromada (Ukrainian: Срібнянська селищна громада) is a hromada of Ukraine, located in Pryluky Raion, Chernihiv Oblast. Its administrative centre is the rural settlement of Sribne.

It has an area of 578.0 square kilometres (223.2 mi^{2}) and a population of 10,519, as of 2020.

== Composition ==
The hromada includes twenty-nine settlements: two rural settlements (Sribne and Dihtiari) and twenty-seven villages, namely:

- Antishky
- Artemenkiv
- Deimanivka
- Halka
- Hnativka
- Horobiivka
- Hrytsiivka
- Hurbyntsi
- Ivankivtsi
- Kaliuzhyntsi
- Karpylivka
- Kharytonivka
- Khukalivka
- Kuty
- Lebedyntsi
- Lozove
- Nykonivka
- Oleksyntsi
- Pobochiivka
- Podil
- Poetyn
- Savyntsi
- Sokyryntsi
- Tochene
- Trostianets
- Vasiukiv
- Vaskivtsi

== Geography ==
Sribne settlement hromada is located in the east of Pryluky Raion. The distance from the hromada centre to Chernihiv is about 230 km. The territory of the settlement hromada is located within the Dnieper Lowland. The relief of the hromada's surface is a lowland plain, in places transsected by river valleys. The Udai (Sula basin) and its tributaries flow through Sribne hromada, and there are many ponds.

The climate of Sribne settlement hromada is moderately continental, with warm summers and relatively mild winters. The average temperature in January is about −7°C, and in July +19°C. The average annual precipitation ranges from 550 to 660 mm, with the highest level of precipitation in the summer period.

The soil cover of Sribne settlement hromada is dominated by chernozem and podzolised soils. The hromada is located on forest steppe, in Polesia. The main species in the forests are pine, oak, alder, ash, and birch. Minerals: sand, clay.

== Economy ==
The leading sectors of the hromada's economy are agriculture and the food industry. There is a dairy-processing plant in the hromada centre of Sribne.

=== Transportation ===
The nearest railway stations are in Pryluky (43 km) and Romny (44 km). The national highway H07 Kyiv–Sumy–Yunakivka passes through the hromada.

== See also ==
- List of hromadas of Ukraine
