= Mykhailo Verykivsky =

Ukrainian conductor and composer (1896–1962)

- Михайло Іванович Вериківський
- Born: 20 November 1896 (O.S. 8 November 1896); Russian Empire
- Died: 14 June 1962; Kyiv, Ukrainian SSR, Soviet Union
- Education: Kyiv Conservatory
- Occupations: Composer, conductor, teacher
- Years active: 1914–1960
- Notable work: Pan Kaniovsky; The Sotnyk; The Servant Girl
- Awards: Honored Artist of Ukraine (1944)

Mykhailo Verykivsky (Ukrainian: Михайло Іванович Вериківський 20 November [O.S. 8 November] 1896 – 14 June 1962) was a Ukrainian composer, conductor and teacher. He was an Honored Artist of Ukraine in 1944.

== Biography ==
In early years Mykhailo Verykivsky grows in an atmosphere of love and respect for Ukrainian native folk songs, which influenced his musical work. After graduating from elementary school, Verykivsky entered the city school and was admitted to the bishop's choir. He continued his musical education at the Kremenets Commercial School (1912–1914), where he conducted the choir and orchestra of folk instruments, played in the school symphony orchestra, studied cello, piano and made his first attempts at composition - he created piano preludes and romances.

In 1914 Verykivsky began to study at Kyiv Conservatory as double bass player. In 1915 with the beginning of World War І Verykivsky was determined to enter the military college where he studies until 1918. In 1918 he rejoin Kyiv Conservatory to the composition class of Boleslav Yavorsky and graduated in 1923.

From 1922 he works as a teacher at the Mykola Lysenko Institute of Music and Drama and, later, in Kyiv Conservatory (until 1960, with a break in 1941–1944; from 1946 he was its professor).

1920 - leader of the Ukrainian National Chorus; 1921–1928 - co-founder, board member and chairman of the Mykola Leontovych Society; 1928–1930 - Chairman of the Presidium and head of the scientific and creative department of the All-Ukrainian Society of Revolutionary Musicians.

1926–1928 - conductor of the Kyiv Opera and Ballet Theater, 1928–1935 - Kharkiv Opera and Ballet Theater. 1940 - head of the State Chapel "Dumka", 1950-1958 - researcher at the Institute of Art History, Folklore and Ethnography of the USSR Academy of Sciences.

== Legacy ==
His works include the ballet Pan Kaniovsky; (Note: Pan Kaniovsky, in reference to a Polish magnate Mikołaj Potocki, is an antihero from the Ukrainian folk ballad A Song of Bondarivna) 5 operas (including Taras Shevchenko-based operas The Sotnyk (Note: Sotnyk was a Ukrainian cossacks' military rank) and The Servant Girl); an oratorio on Marusia Bohuslavka; five cantatas; a concerto for piano and orchestra (1950); a number of orchestral works; a large body of piano music; chamber and church music; original choral works and arrangements of Ukrainian folk songs for chorus; about 70 original solo art songs and settings of Ukrainian folk songs for voice and piano; children's songs; and music for radio and films.

Сhoral genre is a most important in Verikivsky's legacy. His works include five types of works - large forms, choral miniatures, folk songs choral arrangements, music for church and music for children. These compositions are highly influenced by Mykola Leontovich.

=== Selected works ===
Operas

- Heaven works ("Діла небесні", 1931)
- The Sotnyk ("Сотник", 1939)
- The Servant Girl ("Наймичка»", 1943)
- Runaways ("Втікачі", 1948)
- Glory ("Слава", 1961)

Other stage works

- Musical comedy Viy («Вій», 1936, revised in 1945) (Note: "Viy": based on Nikolay Gogol's horror story "Viy")
- Ballet Pan Kaniovsky («Пан Каньовський», 1930)

Choral and symphonic works

- Оratorio A duma about Marusia Bohuslavka the Warrior Girl («Дума про дівку-бранку Марусю Богуславку», 1923)
- Simphonic suite Freckles («Веснянки», 1924)
- Cantata The wrath of the Slavs («Гнів слов'ян», 1941)
- Symphonic poem Petro Konashevych-Sahaidachny («Петро Конашевич-Сагайдачний», 1944). (Note: About Petro Konashevych-Sahaidachny)

Other

- over 60 chamber and vocal works
- over 40 (regular) songs and about 100 songs for children
- about 100 arrangements of Ukrainian folk songs for various artists

== Sources ==
- Verykivsky, Mykhailo, Encyclopedia of Ukraine,
- Encyclopedia of modern Ukraine (in Ukrainian)
- Davydova O. M. (2014) Михайло Вериківський: пошук шляху [Mykhailo Verykivsky: finding a way] (in Ukrainian), Naukovyi visnyk Natsionalnoi muzychnoi akademii Ukrainy imeni P. I. Chaikovskoho 112, 66-72
