= Koliada =

Winter festivities in East Europe

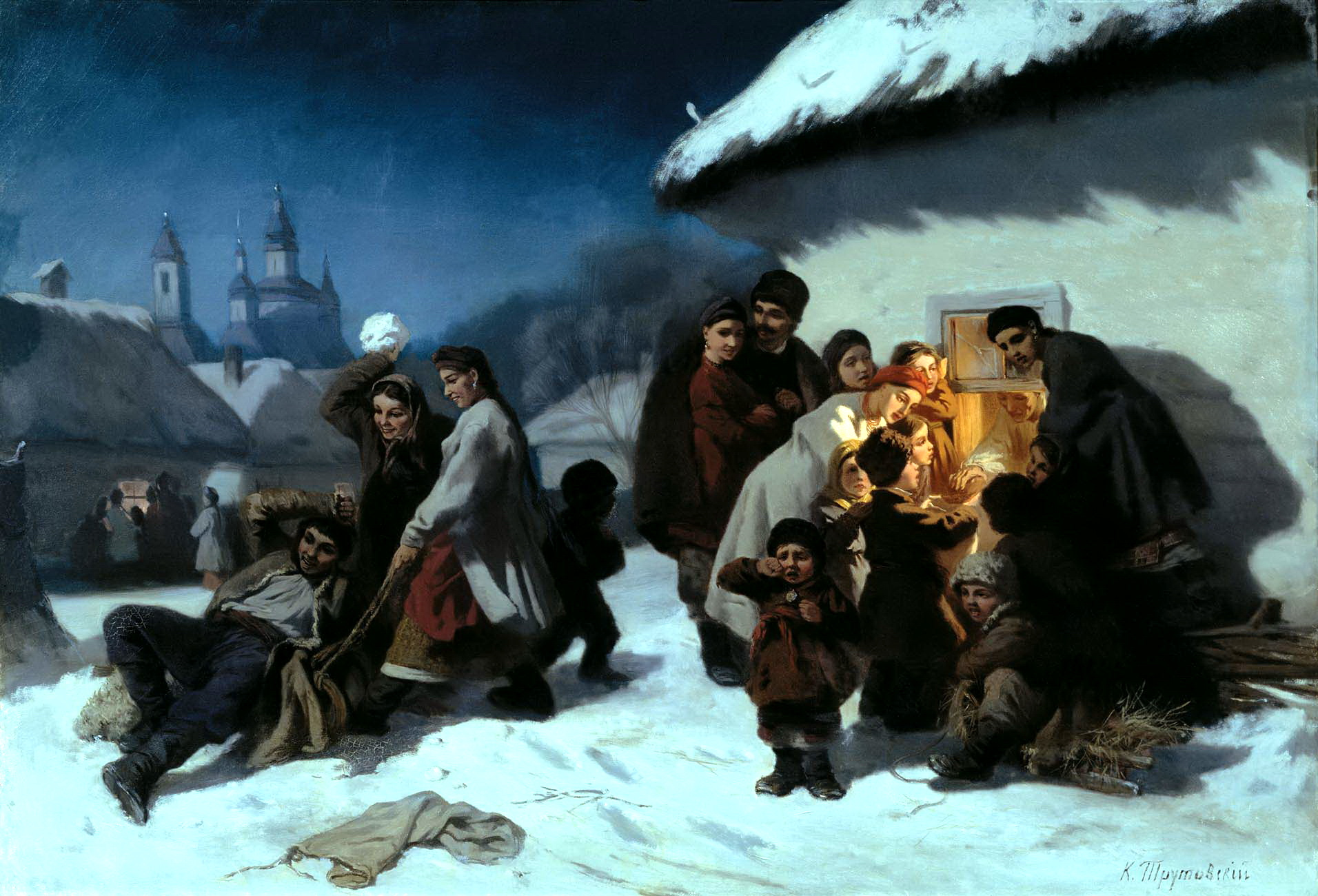
- Christmas carolers in Ukraine ("Little Russia") by K. Trutovsky
- Also called: Kolyada, Koleda, Colindă
- Observed by: Christians in East Europe and Southeastern Europe
- Date: December 25, January 7, January 6, December 24
- First time: unknown
- Related to: Christmas traditions, Eastern Orthodox liturgical days

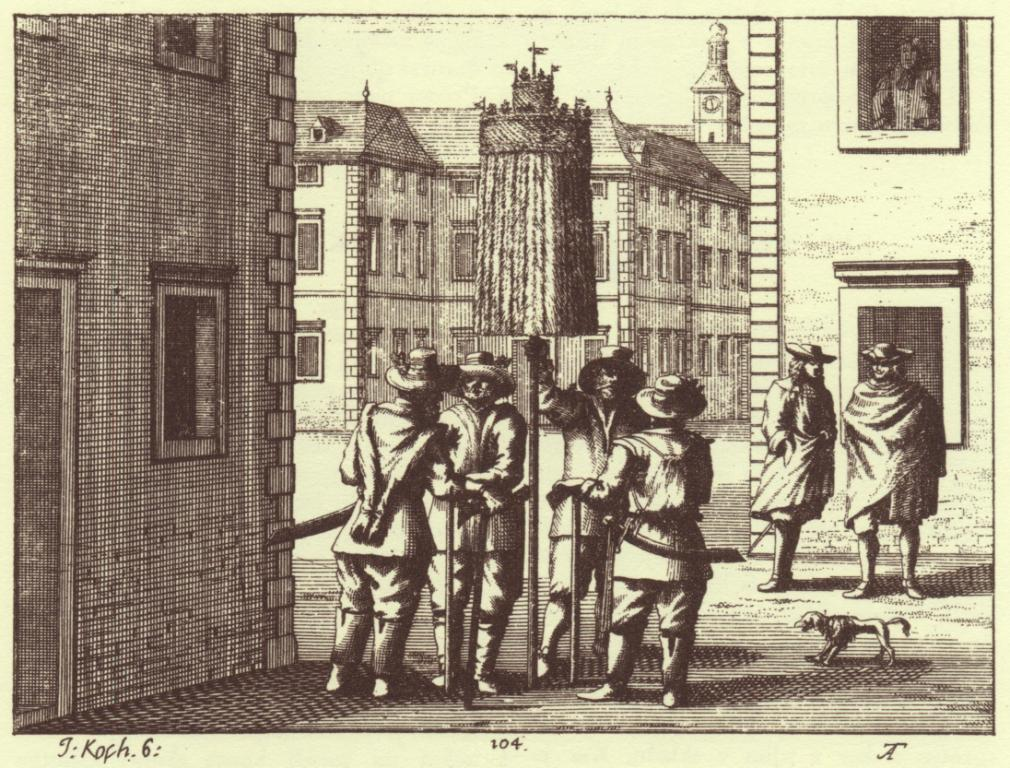
Koledari bearing a candle-pole, as depicted in 1689 by Johann Weikhard von Valvasor

Koliada or koleda (Cyrillic: каляда, коляда, коледа, колада, коледе) is the traditional Slavic name for the period from Christmas to Epiphany or, more generally, for Christmas-related rituals, some dating to pre-Christian times. It represents a festival or holiday, celebrated at the end of December to honor the sun during the Northern Hemisphere winter solstice, and is practiced in East Europe. It also involves groups of singers, koledari, who visit houses to sing carols.

One theory states that Koliada is the name of a cycle of winter rituals stemming from the ancient calendae as for example the Kalenda Proclamation.

== Terminology ==
The word originated in Old Church Slavonic Kolęda (Колѧда). It is used in modern Russian (Коляда́, pronounced [kəlʲɪˈda]), Ukrainian ("Коляда" pronounced [kɔlʲɐˈda]), Belarusian (Каляда, Kalyada, Kaliada), Polish (Szczodre Gody kolęda [kɔˈlɛnda]), Bulgarian, Macedonian, Serbo-Croatian (Коледа, Коледе, koleda, kolenda), Lithuanian (Kalėdos, Kalėda), Czech, Slovak, Slovene (koleda) and Romanian (Colindă).

In modern Belarusian (каляда), Ukrainian (koliada), Czech, Slovak, Croatian (koleda, kolenda), Kashubian (kòlãda [kwɛlãda]) and Polish (kolęda [kɔˈlɛ̃da], Old Polish kolenda) the meaning has shifted from Christmas itself to denoting the tradition of strolling, singing, and having fun on Christmas Eve, same in the Balkan Slavs. It specifically applies to children and teens who walk house to house greeting people, singing and sifting grain that denotes the best wishes and receiving candy and small money in return. The action is called kolyadovanye (Russian: Колядования) in Russian, kolyaduvannya (Ukrainian колядування) in Ukrainian and is now applied to similar Old East Slavic celebrations of other old significant holidays, such as Generous Eve (Russian: Маланья, Щедрый вечер, Belarusian: Шчодры вечар, Ukrainian: Щедрий вечiр) the evening before New Year's Day, as well as the celebration of the arrival of spring. Similarly in Bulgaria and North Macedonia, in the tradition of koleduvane (коледуване) or koledarenje (коледарење) around Christmas, groups of children visiting houses, singing carols and receiving a gift at parting. The kids are called 'koledari' or rarely 'kolezhdani' who sing kolyadki (songs).

== Customs ==
=== Songs and performers ===
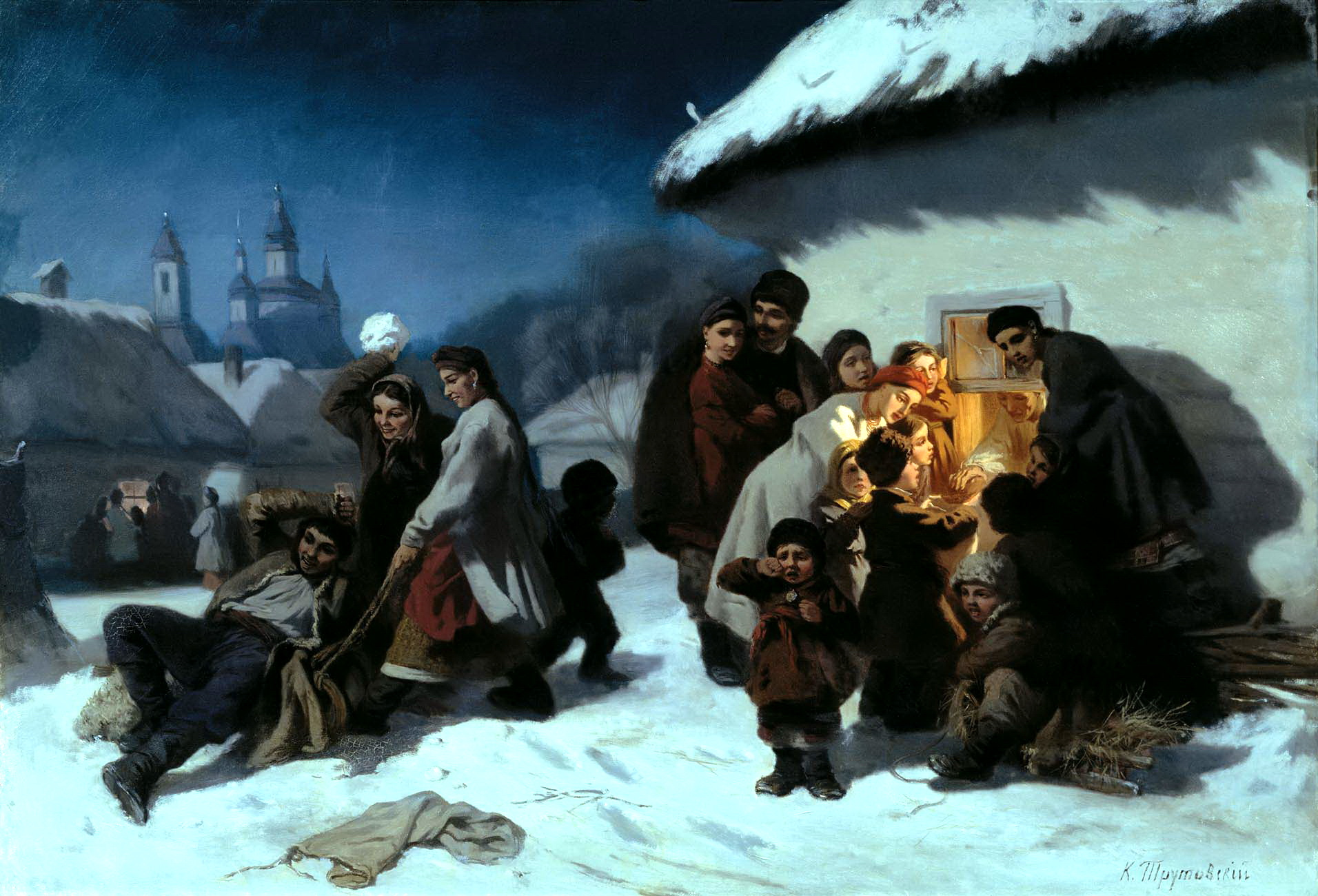
Konstantin Trutovsky. Koliaduvannia in Ukraine. 1864

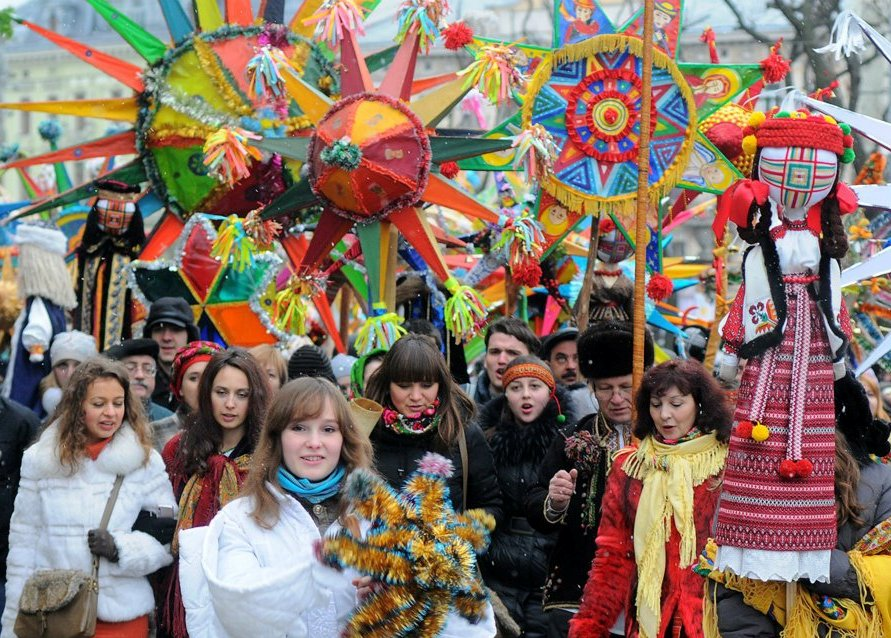
Koliaduvannia in Lviv, Ukraine. City festival. 2012

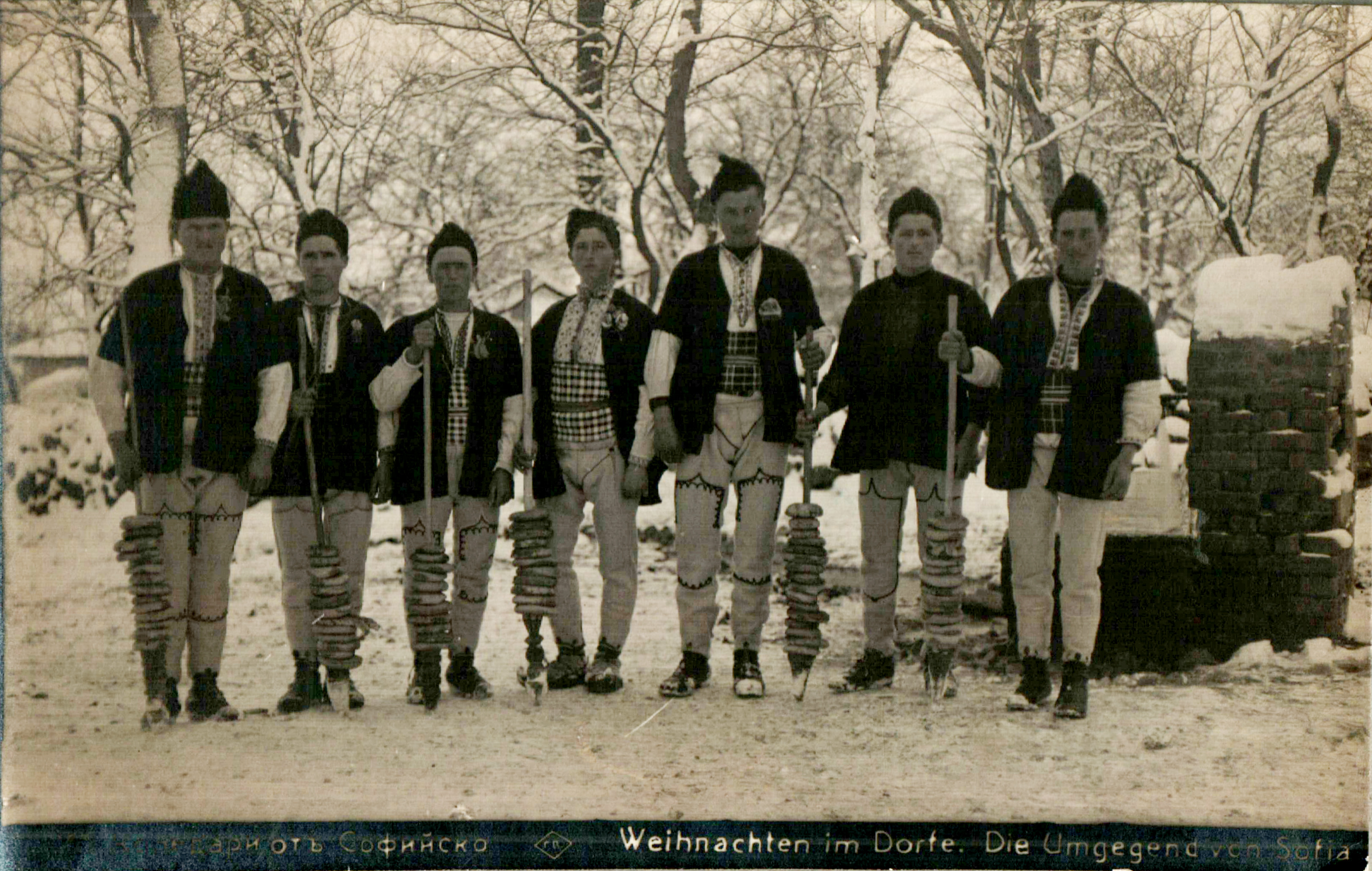
Koledari near Sofia in the mid. of the 20th century.

Koliadari or koliadnyky (Ukrainian: колядники) are Slavic traditional performers of Koliada. It is associated with Koliada (Calends), a celebration incorporated later into Christmas. This type of caroling is called kolędowanie (pronounced [kɔlɛndɔˈvaɲɛ]) in Poland, koleduvane (коледуване) in Bulgaria, colindat in Romania, koliaduvannia (колядування, pronounced [kolʲɐdʊˈwɑnʲːɐ]) in Ukraine, koledování in Czechia and koledarenje (коледарење) or kolede (коледе) in North Macedonia.

=== By countries and peoples ===
==== Belarus ====
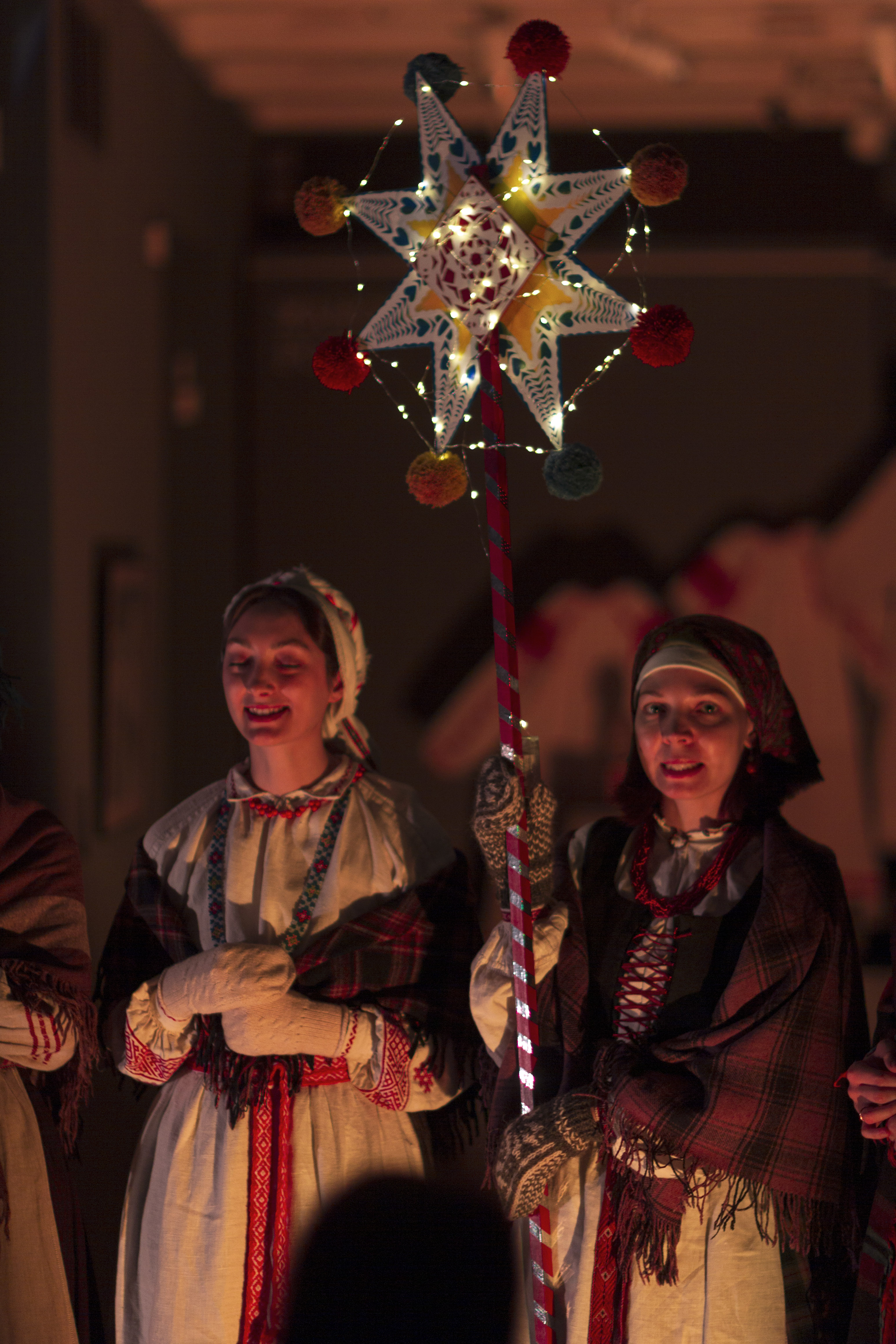
Women singing koliada songs with the star of Bethlehem in Belarus, 2023

==== Croatia ====
Croatian composer Jakov Gotovac wrote in 1925 the composition "Koleda", which he called a "folk rite in five parts", for male choir and small orchestra (three clarinets, two bassoons, timpani and drum). Also, the Dubrovnik kolenda is one of the oldest recorded traditions of this kind in Croatia (its first mentioned in 13th century). There is also a dance from Dubrovnik called "The Dubrovnik Koleda."

==== Bulgaria ====
The koledari carolers traditionally start their rounds at midnight on Christmas Eve. They visit the houses of their relatives, neighbours and other people in the village. The caroling is usually performed by young men, which are accompanied by an elder one called stanenik. Each caroler carries a stick called gega. They wish the people from the village health, wealth and happiness and then the people they wished it too gave them gevreks. The time for the koleduvane is strictly defined by tradition - from midnight to dawn on Christmas Eve. With the power of the songs they have to chase away the demons. By sunrise they lose that power and stop to koleduvat. Preparations began on 20 December. Men are in traditional festive attire with a special decoration on their hats.

==== North Macedonia and northern Greece ====
Kolida (Greek: Κόλιντα), Koliada (Κόλιαντα) or Kolida Babo (Κόλιντα Μπάμπω) is celebrated across northern Greece by the Slavic speakers of Greek Macedonia, in areas from Florina to Thessaloniki. It is celebrated before Christmas by gathering in the village square and lighting a bonfire, followed by local folk music and dancing.

In North Macedonia, the caroling starts early in the morning on 6 January, which is the Christmas Eve or known in Macedonian as Badnik. Usually kids are caroling in North Macedonia and they go from house to house waking the people up with a song. They sing songs called koledarski pesni or carols. After the song is finished, the person, that the song is sung for, rewards the kids with money, fruit, candies, chocolate and other gifts. The kids usually wake up to do this in between 5am and 11am and they go around the whole neighborhood or village. One of the most popular koliadkas (songs) in today North Macedonia is called Kolede lede. It was recorded by the Bulgarian folklorist Dimitar Matov and published in Sofia in 1893.

==== Poland ====
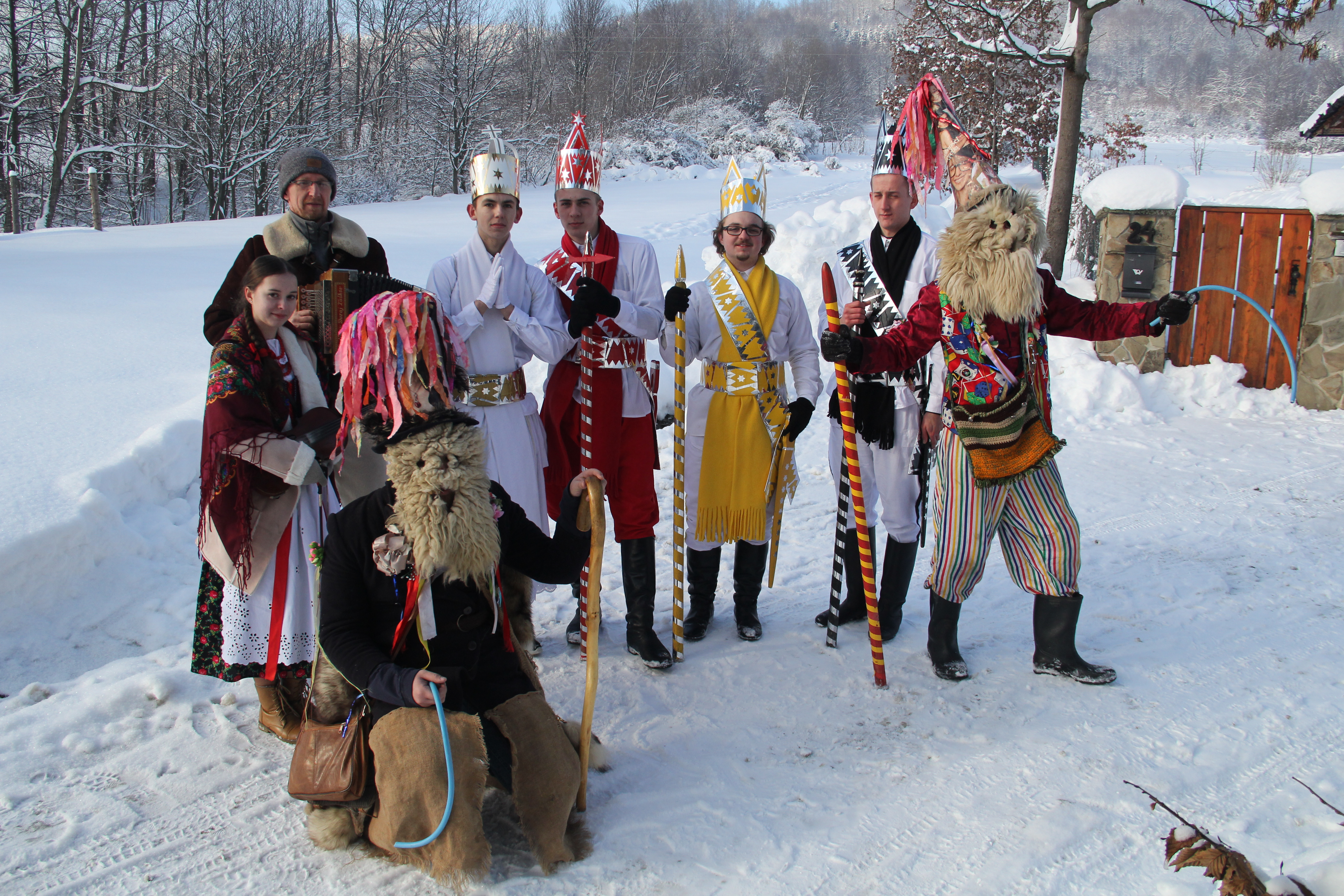
Kolędowanie in Poland, 2019

==== Romania and Moldova ====
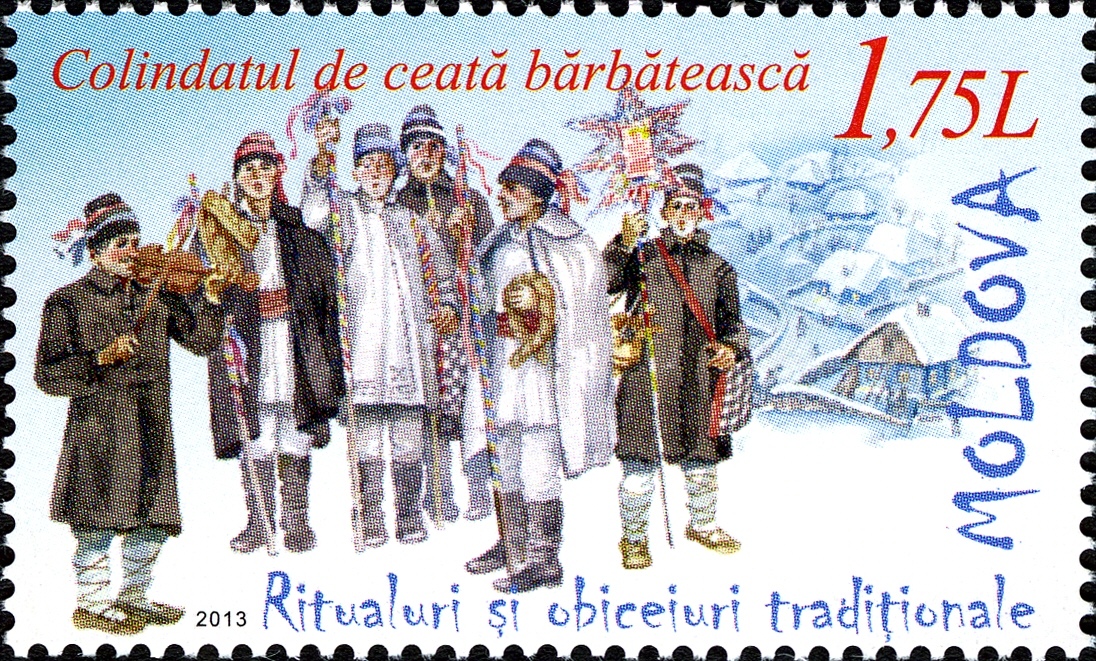
Ritual Moldovan song for Christmas

A colindă (pl. colinde; also colind, pl. colinduri) is a traditional Christmas carol in Romania and the Republic of Moldova. Although the text of all colinde is concerned with the events of the Nativity, certain elements of the folk rituals performed around Christmas are probably pre-Christian in origin, having their roots in the Roman Saturnalia and pagan rituals related to the winter solstice and soil fertility.

Colinde are performed in all parts of Romania (including Moldova), with regional variations in terms of number of participants, exact timing of different melodies and lyrics. In terms of artistic mastery of verse and melody, colinde occupy an important place in the creation of the Romanian people. They form a unity with doine, popular ballads and songs of bravery, with tales, riddles, proverbs and sayings. Coming from the world of village communities, colinde preserve some of the oldest Romanian poetic achievements. They are inspired by the Holy Scripture and Holy Tradition, by the religious services and by the iconography. Colinde have had a role in preserving and defending the Orthodox faith when heterodox proselytizing tried to break the unity of the Orthodox faith, and to dismantle, at the same time, national unity. The Mother of God, who occupies a central place in piety and Orthodox worship, is present everywhere in Romanian colinde, together with her son, Jesus Christ.

In traditional Romanian rural society, preparations for colinde started well in advance (sometimes weeks) before Christmas. The village youth (usually boys) would begin to form groups in different places and designate a leader in order to practice singing in unison. These groups are called cete de colindători, and their numbers vary from region to region. Then, starting on Christmas Eve, the groups would go to different houses and begin singing. In some villages, they go first to the mayor's house, followed by the teacher's house, whereas in other parts there is no pre-established order. The families would then invite them into the house, and give them different small gifts such as nuts, dried fruits and colaci. Examples of colinde with religious subjects are "Astăzi s-a născut Hristos" (Today Christ was born), "Moș Crăciun cu plete dalbe" (Santa Claus with white tresses) and "O, ce veste minunată!" (O, what wonderful news!).

==== Russia ====
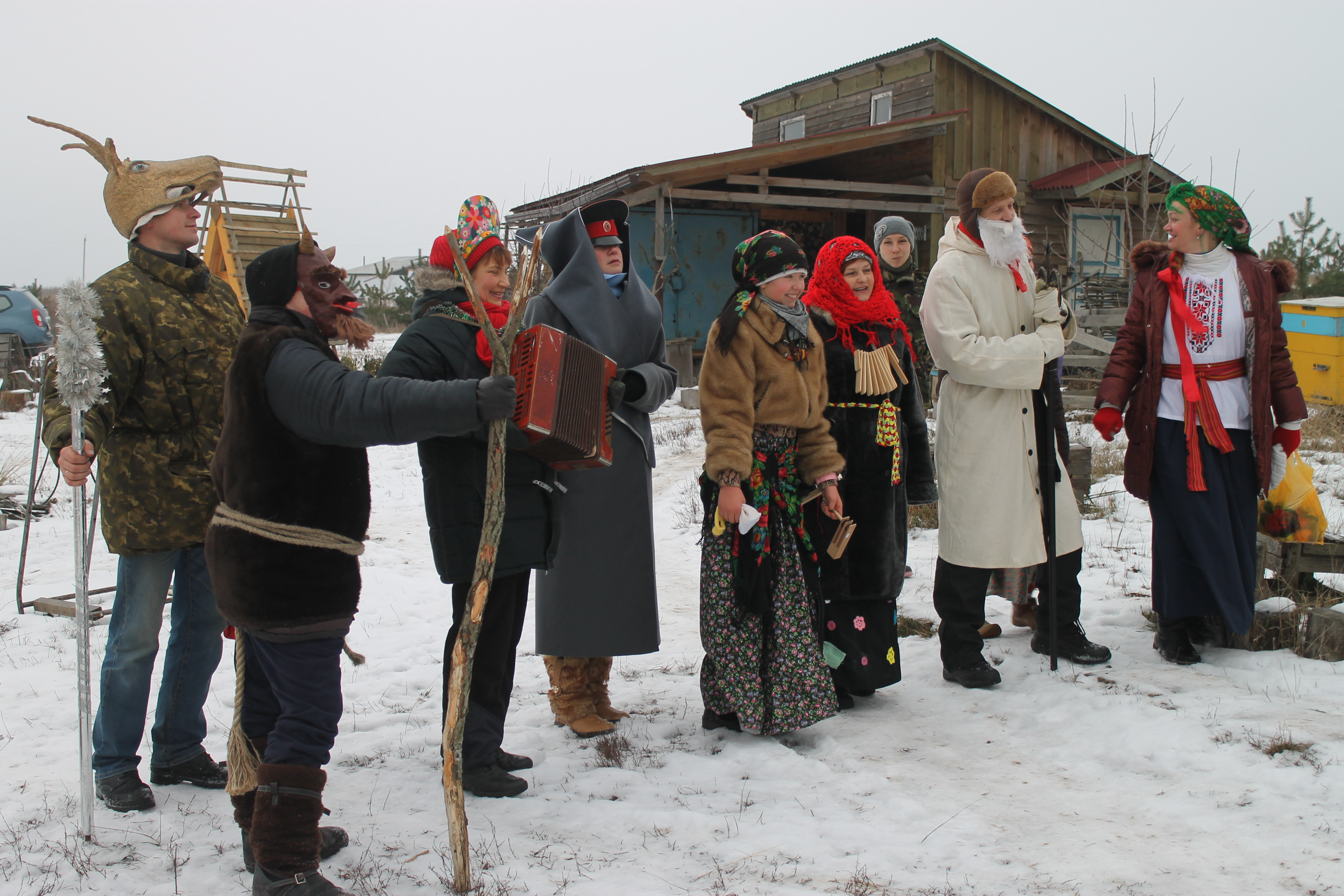
Kolyadka performers in Belgorod Oblast, Russia, 2013

==== Serbia ====
Koledari prepared themselves during several days before the start of the koleda: they practiced the koleda songs, and made their masks and costumes. The masks could be classified into three types according to the characters they represented: the anthropomorphic, the zoomorphic (representing bear, cow, stag, goat, sheep, ox, wolf, stork, etc.), and the anthropo-zoomorphic. The main material from which they were produced was hide. The face, however, could be made separately out of a dried gourd shell or a piece of wood, and then sewn to hide so that the mask could cover all the head. The moustache, beard, and eyebrows were made with black wool, horsehair, or hemp fibers, and the teeth with beans. Zoomorphic and anthropo-zoomorphic masks might have white, black, or red painted horns attached to them. The costumes were prepared from ragged clothes, sheepskins with the wool turned outside, and calf hides. An ox tail with a bell fixed at its end was sometimes attached at the back of them.

The leader of the group was called Grandpa. The other koledari gathered at his house on the eve of koleda, and at midnight they all went out and started their activities. Walking through the streets of the village they shouted and made noise with their bells and ratchets. Most were armed with sabers or clubs. One of them, called Bride, was masked and costumed as a pregnant woman. He held a distaff in his hand and spun hemp fibers. The koledari teased and joked with Bride, which gave a comic note to the koleda. Some of them were called alosniks, the men possessed by the demon ala. There could have been other named characters in the group.

The koledari sung special songs, in which the word koledo, the vocative case of koleda, was inserted in the middle and at the end of each verse.

Besides the singing, the koledari also chased away demons from the household. First they searched the house to find out where the demons hide. They looked everywhere, at the same time shouting, dancing, jumping, knocking on the floor and walls with sticks, and teasing Bride. When they found the demons, they drove them out of the hiding place, and fought with them swinging their sabers and clubs. After the demons were chased away, the koledari briefly danced the kolo, and then blessed the household. As a reward, they received a loaf of bread which the family prepared specially for them, and other food gifts.

==== Turkey ====
It is celebrated in the Büyükmandıra village of Babaeski district, Kırklareli Province in Turkey as a halloween-like festival and dates back a thousand years.

==== Ukraine ====
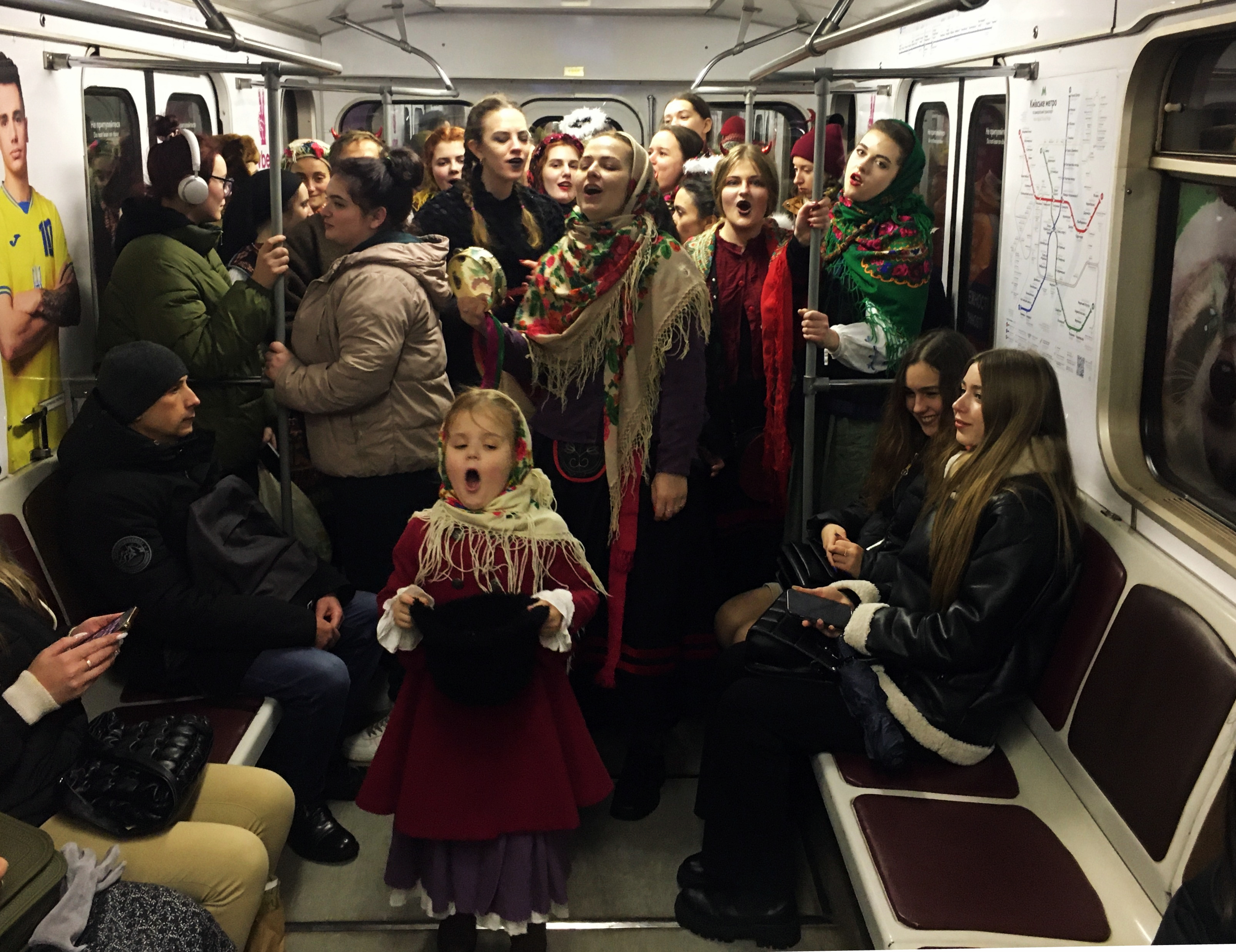
Carolers in Kyiv Metro in December 2023

At the end of the Sviata Vecheria, and the vigil that follows, Ukrainian families often sing carols (koliadky). In some communities the ancient Ukrainian tradition of caroling is carried on by groups of young people and members of organizations and churches calling at homes and collecting donations. Well-known carols include Nova radist stala, Boh predvichnyi narodyvsia, Dobryi vechir tobi, pane hospodariu, Vo Vyfleiemi nyni novyna, Nebo i zemlia nyni torzhestvuiut, and Boh sia rozhdaie.

In Ukraine, caroling may also take place along with a staged play called Vertep.

== See also ==
- Korochun
- Crăciun (disambiguation)
- Twelfth Night (holiday)
- Yule
- Christmas carol
  - List of Christmas carols
- Jasličkári
- Ķekatas
- Koliadka
- Koledari
- Mummering
- Turoń
- Shchedryk (song)
- Calennig
- Christmas Waits
- Beltane, Gaelic festival in honour of the sun
- Festive Procession with a Song. Kolyada
- "Shchedryk" (song), a Ukrainian New Year carol
