= Crăciun =

Crăciun (pronounced [krəˈtʃjun]) is the Romanian word for Christmas. It may also refer to:

== People with the surname Crăciun ==
- Adriana Crăciun (born 1989), Romanian handballer
- Artur Crăciun (born 1998), Moldovan football player
- Cătălin Crăciun (born 1991), Romanian football player
- Claudiu Crăciun (born 1978), Romanian academic, environmental and civic activist
- Constanța Crăciun (1914–2002), Romanian politician, vice president of the State Council from 1965 to 1969
- Cristian Crăciun (born 1972), Romanian football player
- Doina Spîrcu (née Craciun; born 1970), Romanian rower
- Estefanía Craciún (born 1987), Uruguayan tennis player
- Eugen Crăciun (born 1986), Romanian football player
- Florin Cezar Crăciun (born 1989), Romanian bobsledder
- Georgia Crăciun (born 1999), Romanian tennis player
- Gheorghe Crăciun (1950–2007), Romanian novelist, translator and literary theorist
- Ioana Strungaru (née Crăciun; born 1989), Romanian rower
- Moise Crăciun (born 1927), Romanian cross country skier
- Monica Craciun, British-Romanian physicist and academic
- Nicolae Craciun (born 1994), Italian sprint canoeist
- Niculae-Cornel Crăciun (born 1925), Romanian Nordic skier who competed in the 1950s
- Petre Crăciun (born 1962), Romanian children's book writer and journalist
- Sergiu Craciun (born 1984), Italian sprint canoeist
- Teodor-Dacian Crăciun (born 1980), Romanian tennis player

== Geography ==
- Crăciun, a village in Lingura Commune, Cantemir district, Moldova
- Crăciuneasa River, a tributary of the Râul Mare in Romania
- Crăciunelu de Jos, a commune located in Alba County, Romania
- Crăciunești, a commune in Mureș County, Transylvania, Romania
- Crăciun (river), a tributary of the Drăgan in Romania

== See also ==
- Korochun
