= Latvian masked processions =

Mask processing tradition in Latvia

Folk masks from rural Latvian mask processions, 1920s-1930s. A drawing by J.A. Jansons. Latvian folklore repository of the Institute of Literature, Folklore and Art of the University of Latvia

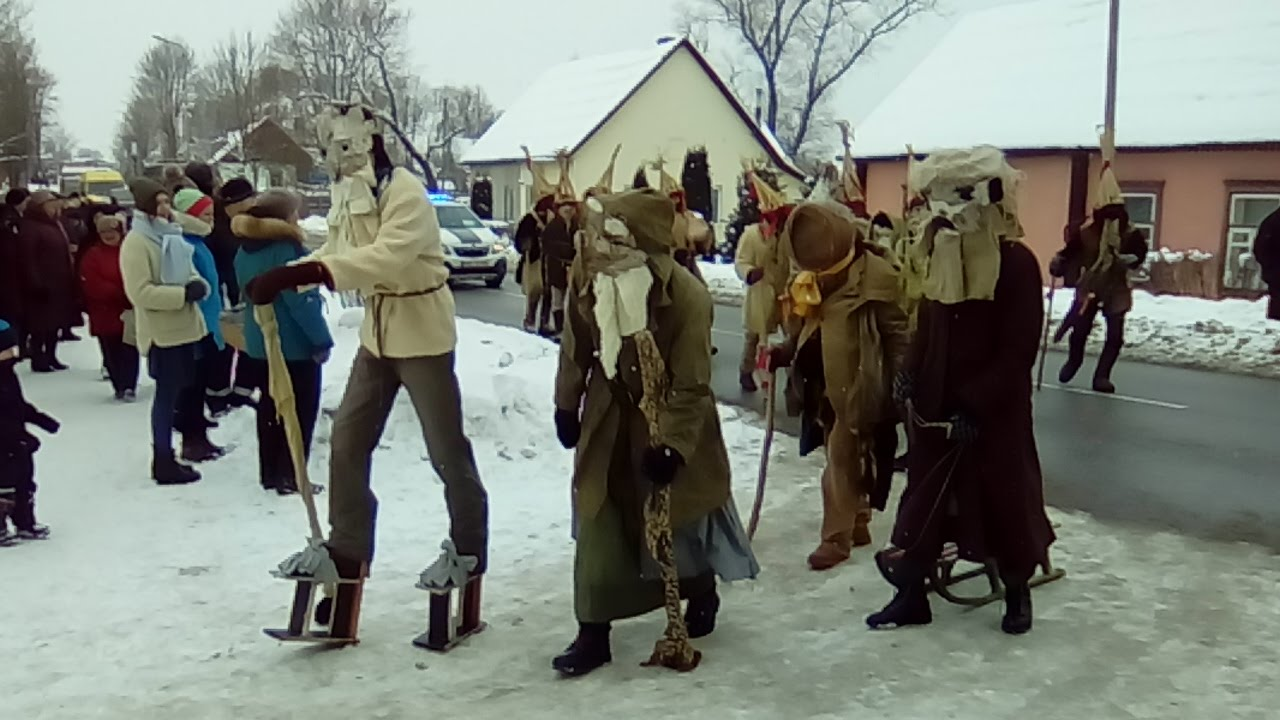
Ķekatas, 2019

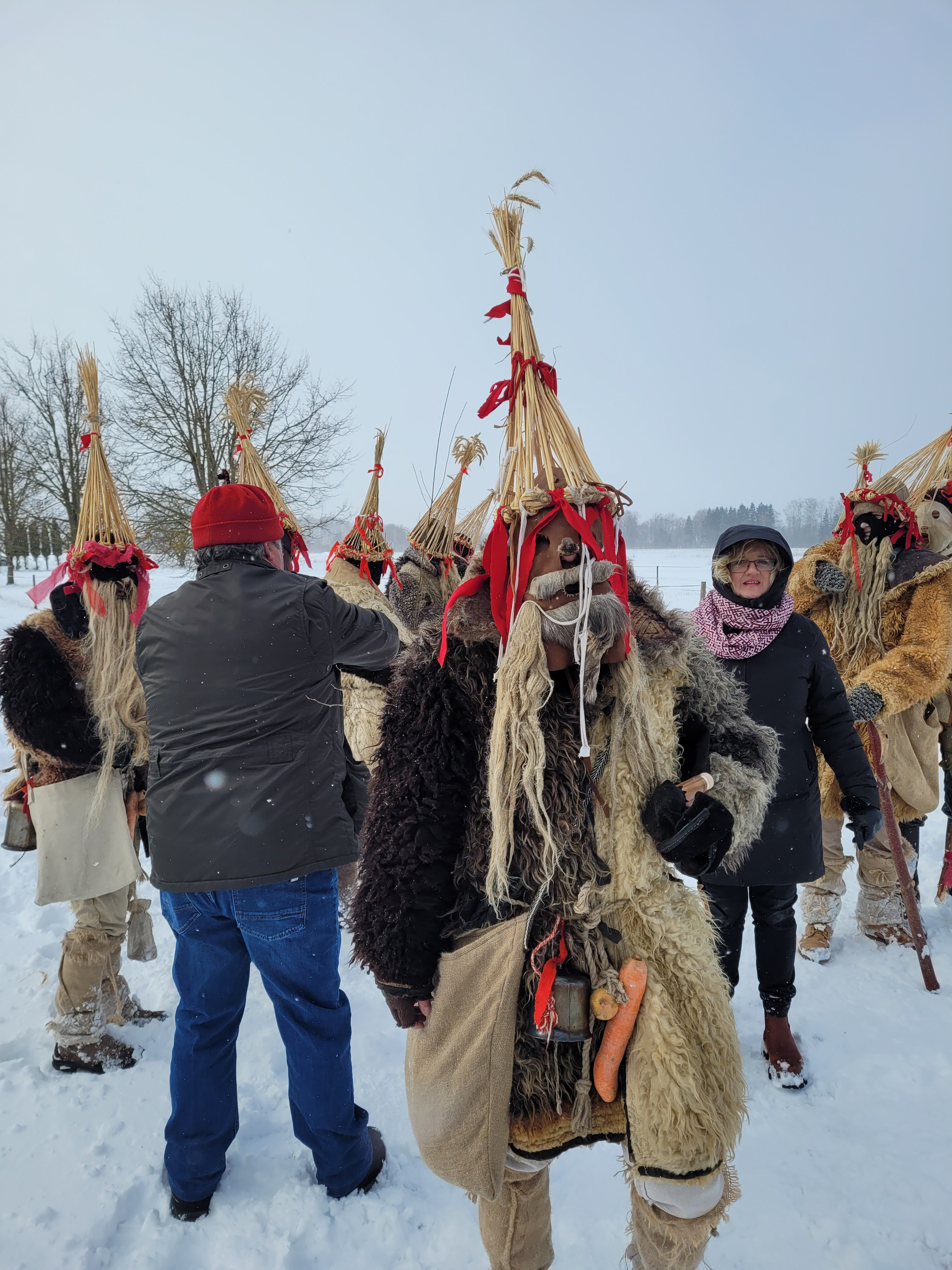
Budēļi, 2023

There is a number of regional variants of Latvian masked processions. Rooted in ritual traditions, by the end of the 19th century, they started losing their religious meaning turning more into an entertainment and gradually they were disappearing, kept by small groups of enthusiasts in some rural regions of Latvia. With the rise of the folklore movement by the end of the 1970s these traditions were revived, and there are several folkloric groups that are trying to reconstruct these, in cooperation with researchers.

Ķekatas (Ķekatas iešana, "stilt walking", "stilt strolling") is a Latvian folk tradition of masked processions. The participants, called Ķekatnieki (singular: Ķekatnieks) wearing various masks went from one homestead to another giving blessings and driving away evil spirits. Since the old times they happened in autumn and winter, when all farmers' work is done any time from St. Martin's Day to Meteņi, depending on the region. The tradition is also associated with Christmas time, similar to mummering-like traditions in other places. In fact, one of the names of the mask procession tradition is kaļadas, borrowed from Slavic Koleda. Other names used in other parts of Latvia include budēļi and čigānos iešana (gypsy walking). These traditions differ not only by the name, but the behavior as well. Masks represented evil beings, animals, objects (haystack, sheaf), people, often stereotyped (little man and tall woman, pauper/beggar, gypsy, Jew)

The gypsy walking, mostly with gypsy masks, but also with other Ķekatas masks is also associated with festivals and wedding parties.

The name of the Zemgale tradition "budēļi" comes from the word "budīt", "budināt" - to awaken, arouse, and the meaning of the tradition is to awaken the nature and people during the spring holiday of Meteņi to a new life cycle.

Folklorist Jānis Alberts Jansons collected testimonies from rural people about masked processions during the 1920s and 1930s, which served as the basis of his doctorate, Die lettischen Maskenumzüge und ihre kulturhistorische Bedeutung, some parts of which were published in German and known only by enthusiasts. Only in 2010 his findings were published in full in Latvian under the title Latviešu masku gājieni: eksperimentāls pētījums ar pamatojumu salīdzinošajā etnogrāfijā un etnoloģijā (Latvian Masked Processions: an experimental study grounded in comparative ethnography and ethnology).

An important contribution to the understanding of the tradition is Aīda Rancāne's 2009 volume Maskas un maskošanās Latvijā (Masks and Masking in Latvia).

== See also ==
- Kukeri
- Ziemassvētki
- Namahage, a Japanese New Year tradition of masked processions
