= Popovca =

Popovca may refer to several places in Moldova:

- Popovca, a village in Lingura Commune, Cantemir district
- Popovca, a village in Natalievca Commune, Făleşti district
