= Kukeri =

Participants in Bulgarian tradition

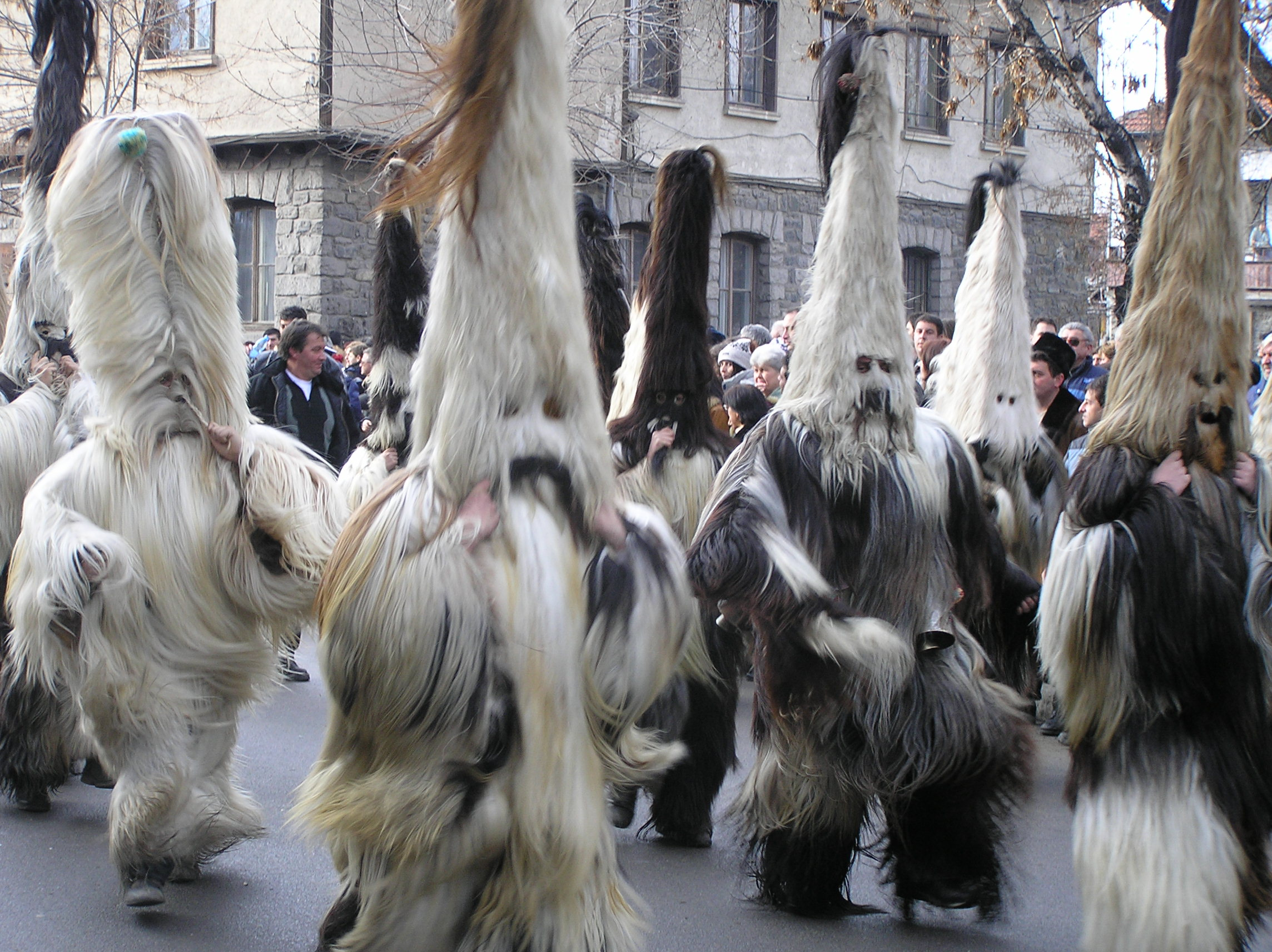
Kukeri in Razlog, Bulgaria

Kukeri (Bulgarian: кукери; singular: kuker, кукер) are elaborately costumed Bulgarian men who perform traditional rituals intended to scare away evil spirits.

Closely related traditions are found in other Balkan countries. The costumes cover most of the body and include decorated wooden masks of animals (sometimes double-faced) and large bells attached to the belt. Around New Year and before Lent, the Kukeri walk and dance through villages to scare away evil spirits with their costumes and the sound of their bells. They are also believed to provide a good harvest, health, and happiness to the village for the year ahead. The Kukeri traditionally visit people's houses at night so that "the sun would not catch them on the road." After parading around the village, they usually gather at the square to dance wildly and amuse people. Kukeri rituals vary by region but remain largely the same in essence.

19th-century scholars considered the Kukeri to have a pre-Christian Thracian origin and theorised that they were a remnant of a Thracian cult of the god Dionysus, a view that was encouraged by Bulgarian nationalists and folklorists who wished to lend Bulgarian cultural practices a sense of prestige via association with the classical world. However, modern scholarship generally rejects that view, and Kukeri are now considered to be part of a general Balkan mumming tradition that emerged sometime in the early modern period, influenced by Greek, Slavic, Albanian, and Turkish practices.

== Distribution and etymology ==
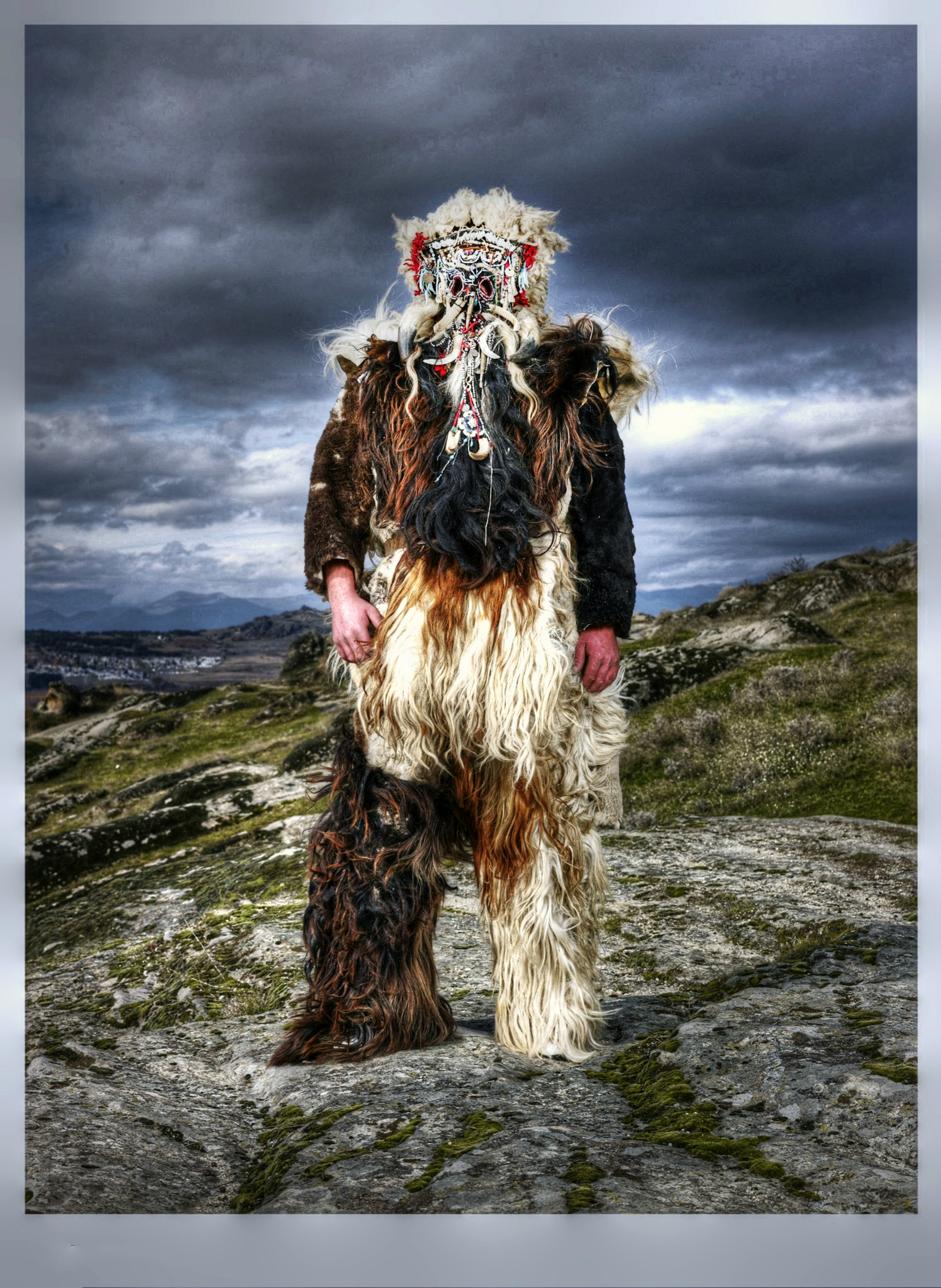
A Mechkari performer in Prilep, North Macedonia

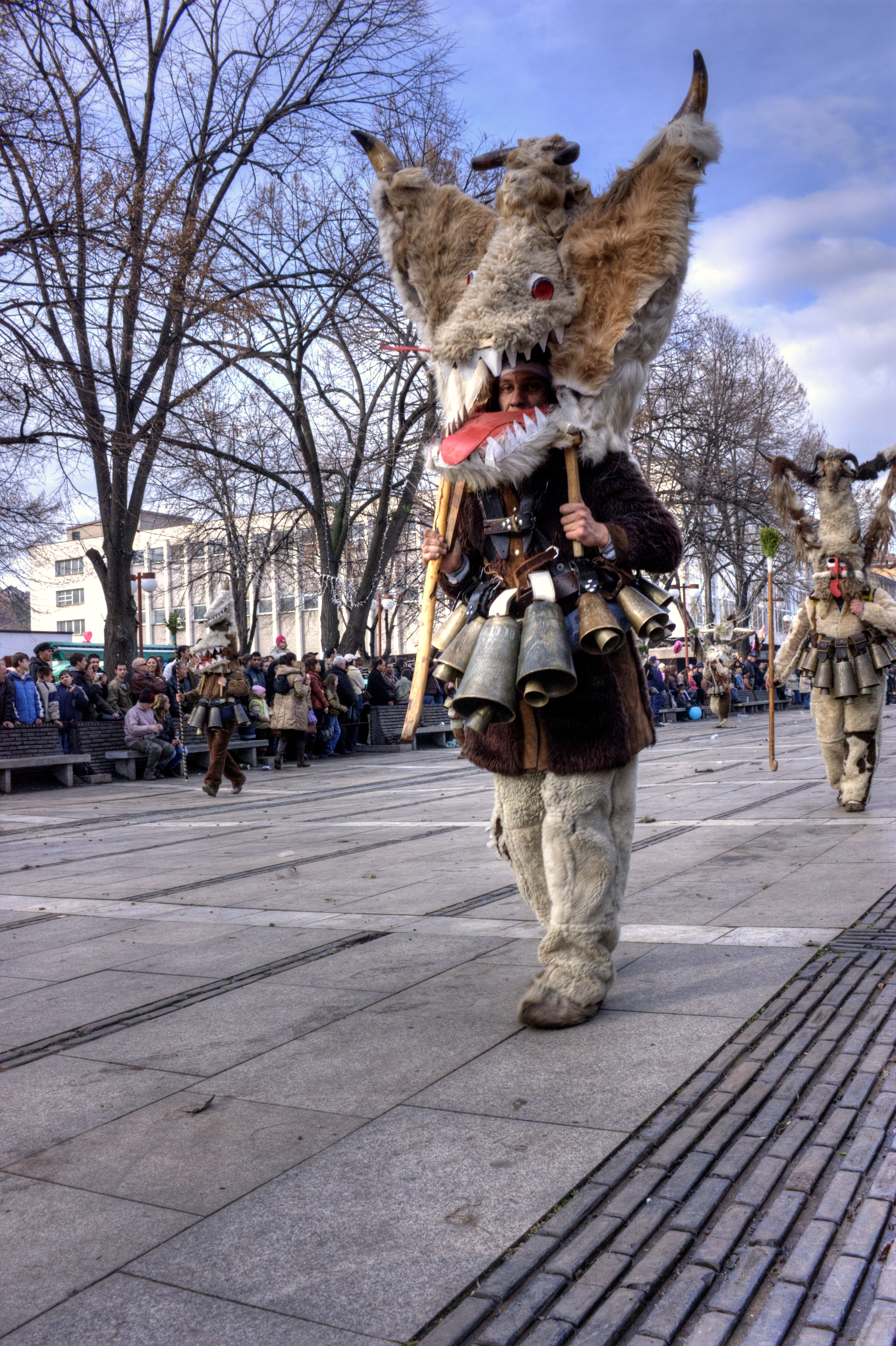
A Kuker in Pernik, Bulgaria

The precise origin of the word "Kukeri" is unclear. The term could be derived from Proto-Slavic *kuka ("evil spirit"), with the agentive suffix *-ařь (literally meaning a "chaser of evil spirits"), or from a pre-Slavic divinity named Kuk.

Another theory suggests the name kuker derived from the Latin cuculla,, meaning "hood, cowl" or cucurum, "quiver" (in the sense of a container; an abbreviation of koukouros geros), though the practice pre-dates Roman rule by several centuries.

The corresponding figure in Greek-speaking Thrace is known as Kalogeros ("monk" or literally the "good-old" one), also shortened to cuci, in former Yugoslavia known as didi, didici, in Bulgaria as kuker or babushar, as momogeros in Pontic Anatolia, and in North Macedonia as babari or mechkari ("bear-man"). In Romania, this figure mostly appears together with a goat, known as capra, turca, or brezaia.

== Kukeri ==
Kukeri dancing in Kalipetrovo, Bulgaria

Kuker is a divinity personifying fecundity. It is sometimes in Bulgaria and Serbia a plural divinity. In Bulgaria, a ritual spectacle of spring (a sort of Carnival) takes place after a folk theatre play, in which Kuker's role is interpreted by a man attired in a sheep- or goat-pelt, wearing a horned mask and girded with a large wooden phallus. During the ritual, various physical acts are performed, including the sexual act, as a symbol of the god's sacred marriage, while the symbolic wife, appearing pregnant, mimes the pains of giving birth. This ritual inaugurates the labors of the fields (ploughing, sowing) and is carried out with the participation of numerous allegorical personages, among whom is the emperor and his entourage.

== Gallery ==
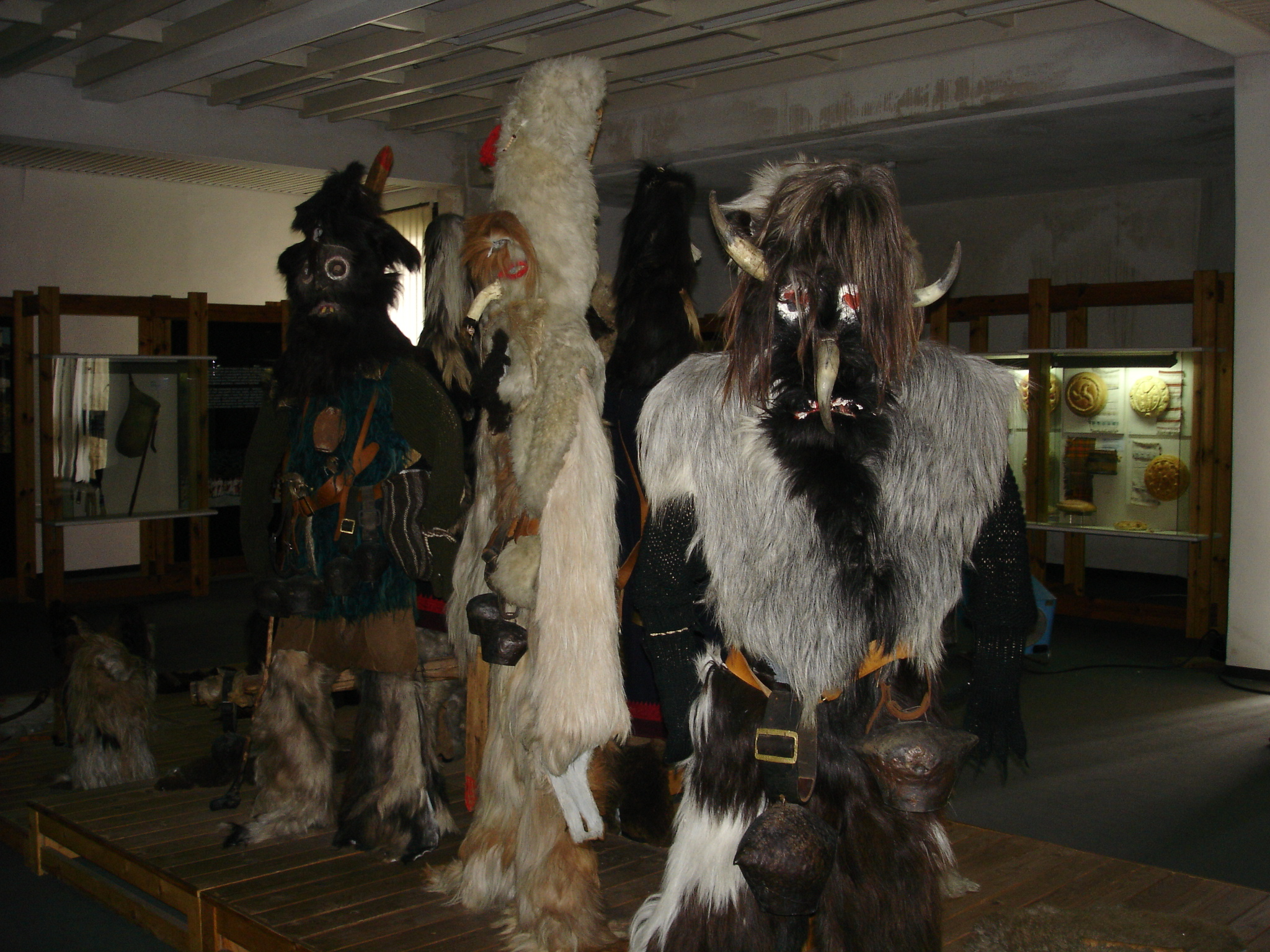
Kukeri in Smolyan

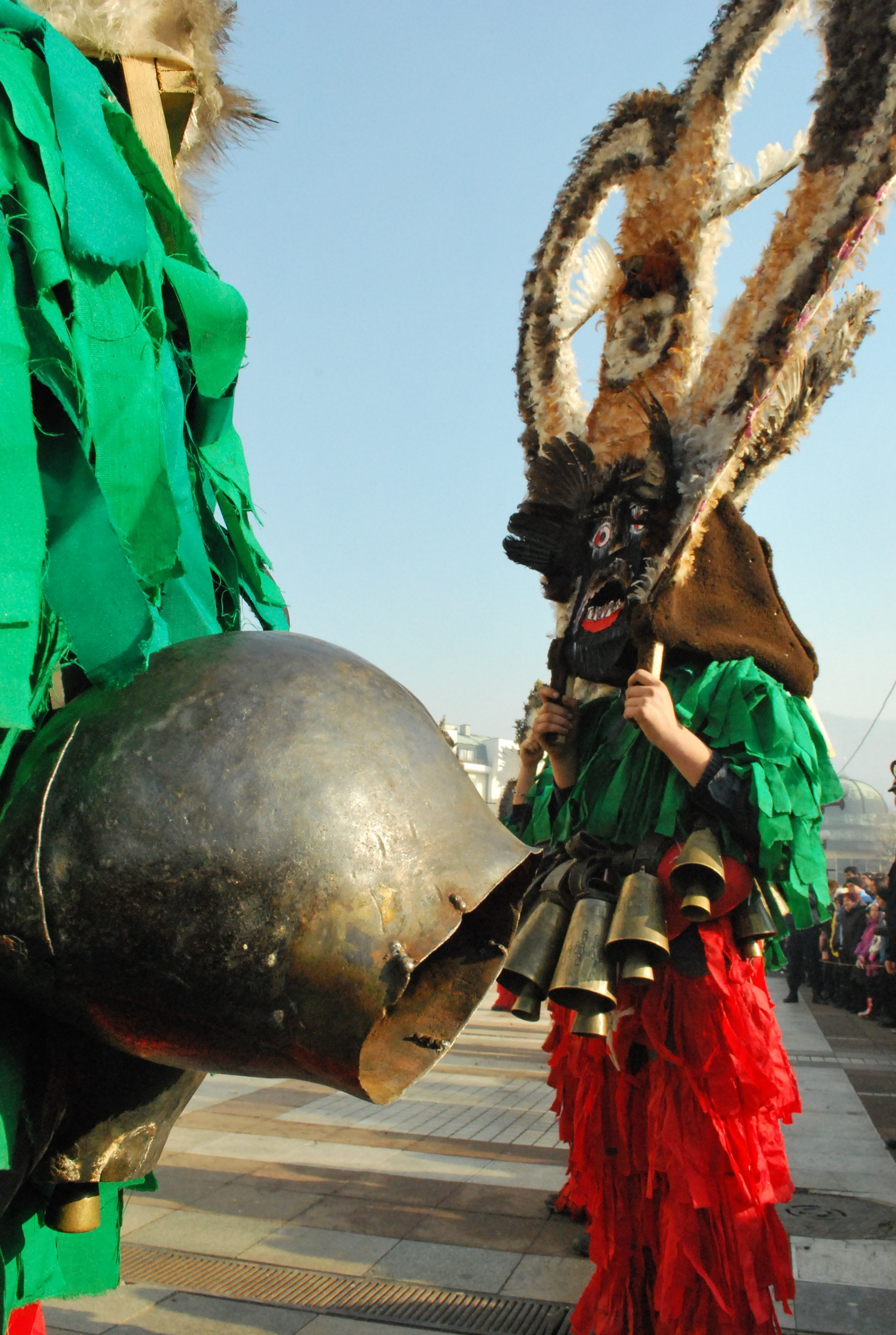
Kukeri in Blagoevgrad

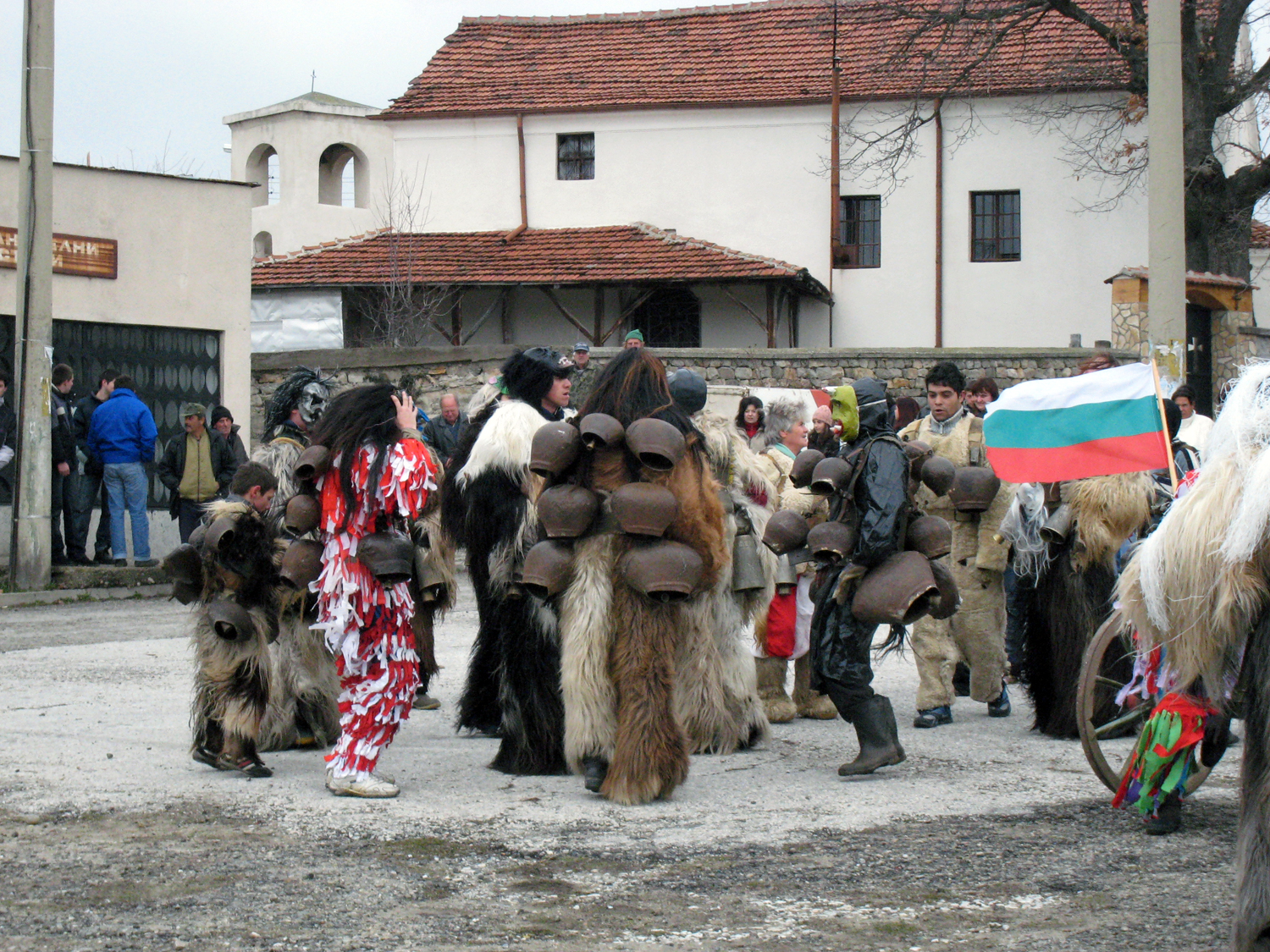
Kukeri in Gorna Vasilitsa

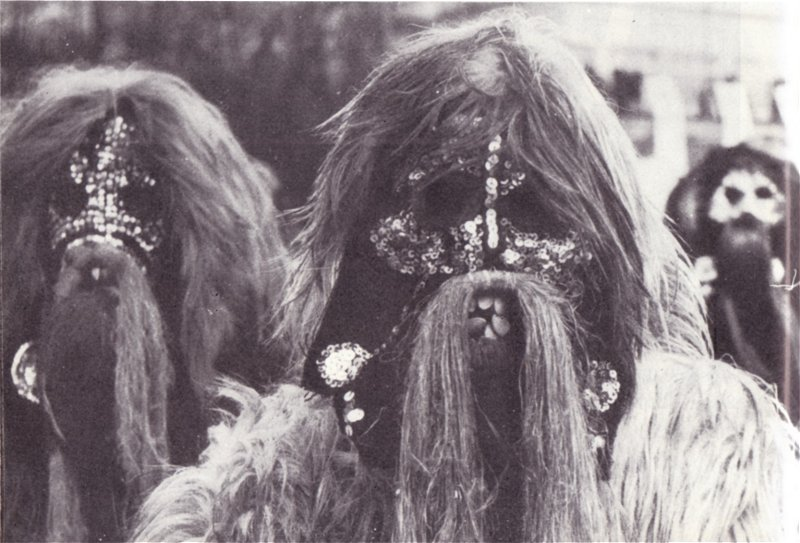
Kukeri masks from Zidarovo

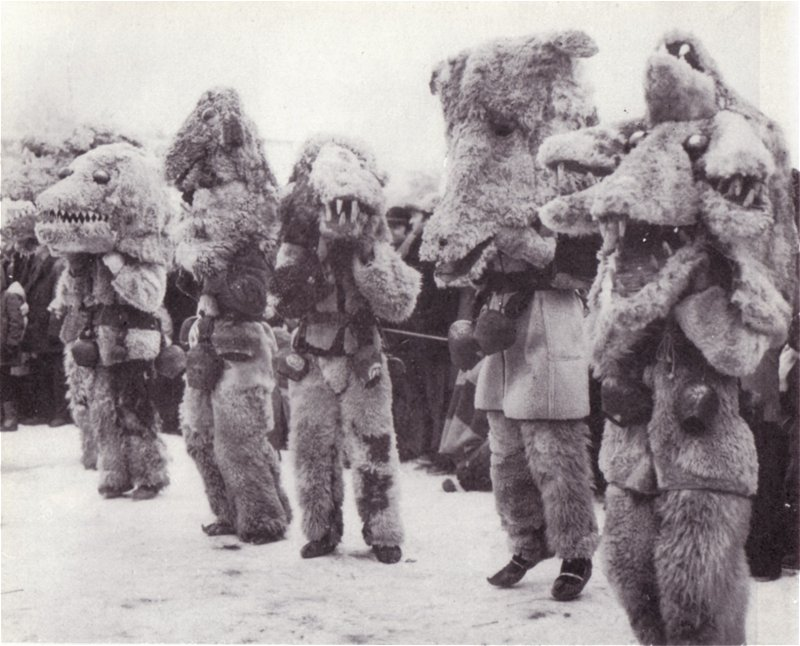
Kukeri masks from Pernik

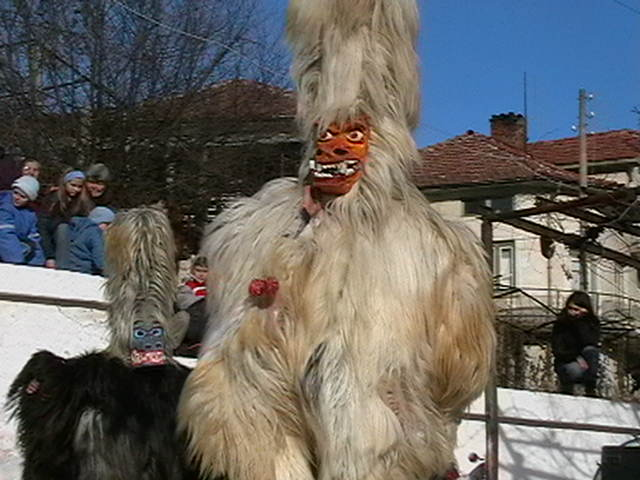
Kukeri in Brezhani

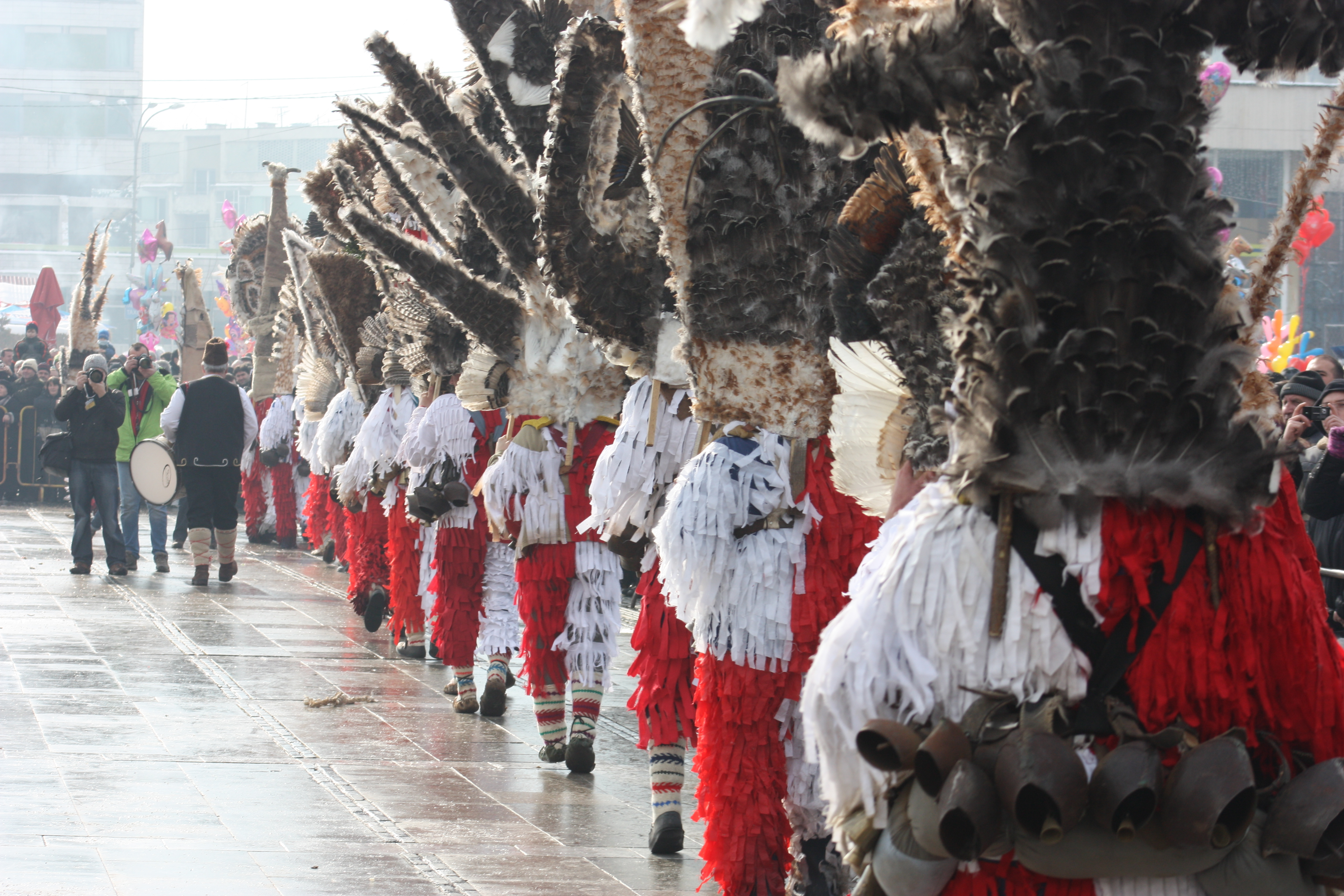
Kukeri parade in the village of Drugan

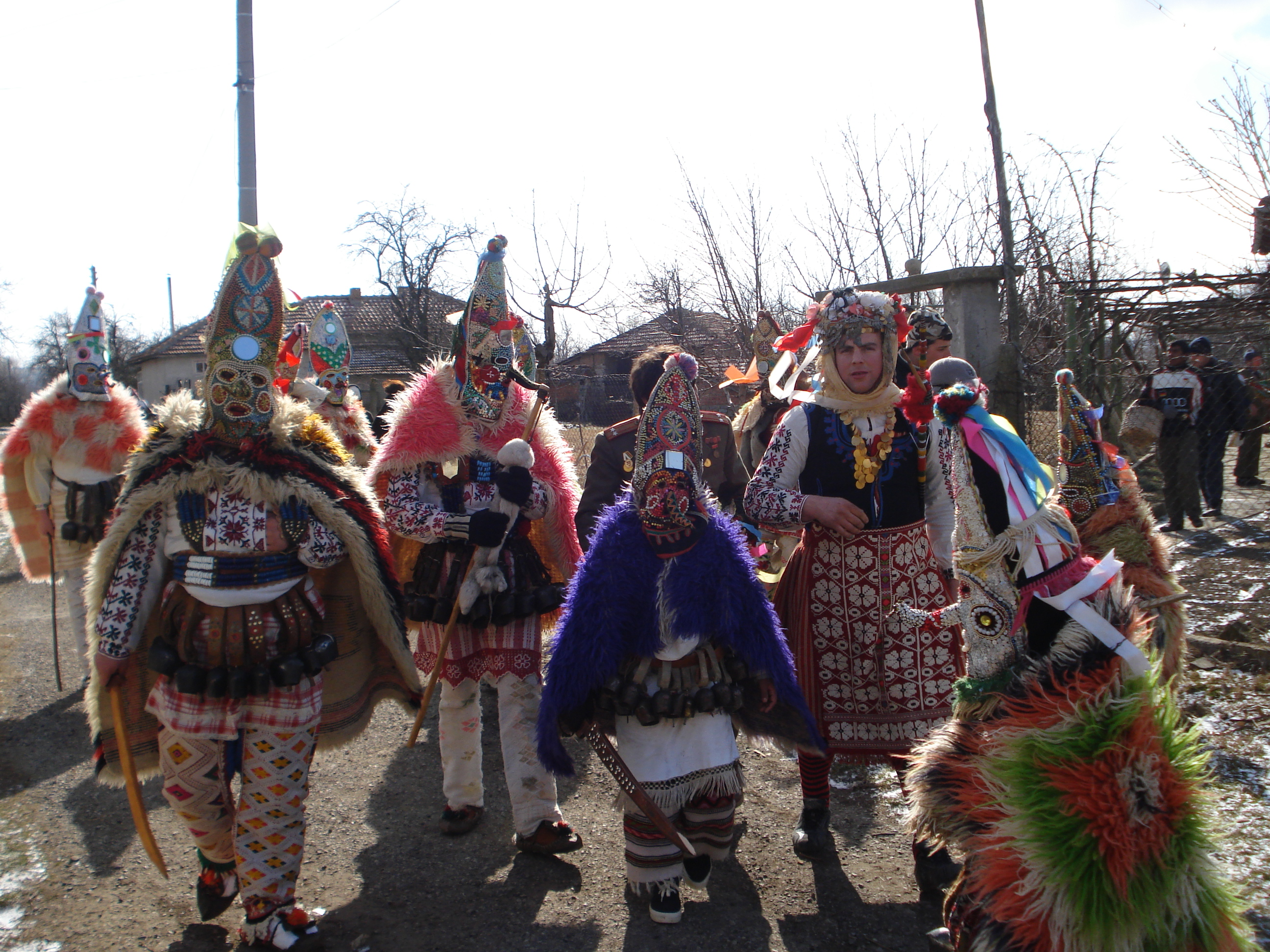
Kukeri in the village of Pudarevo

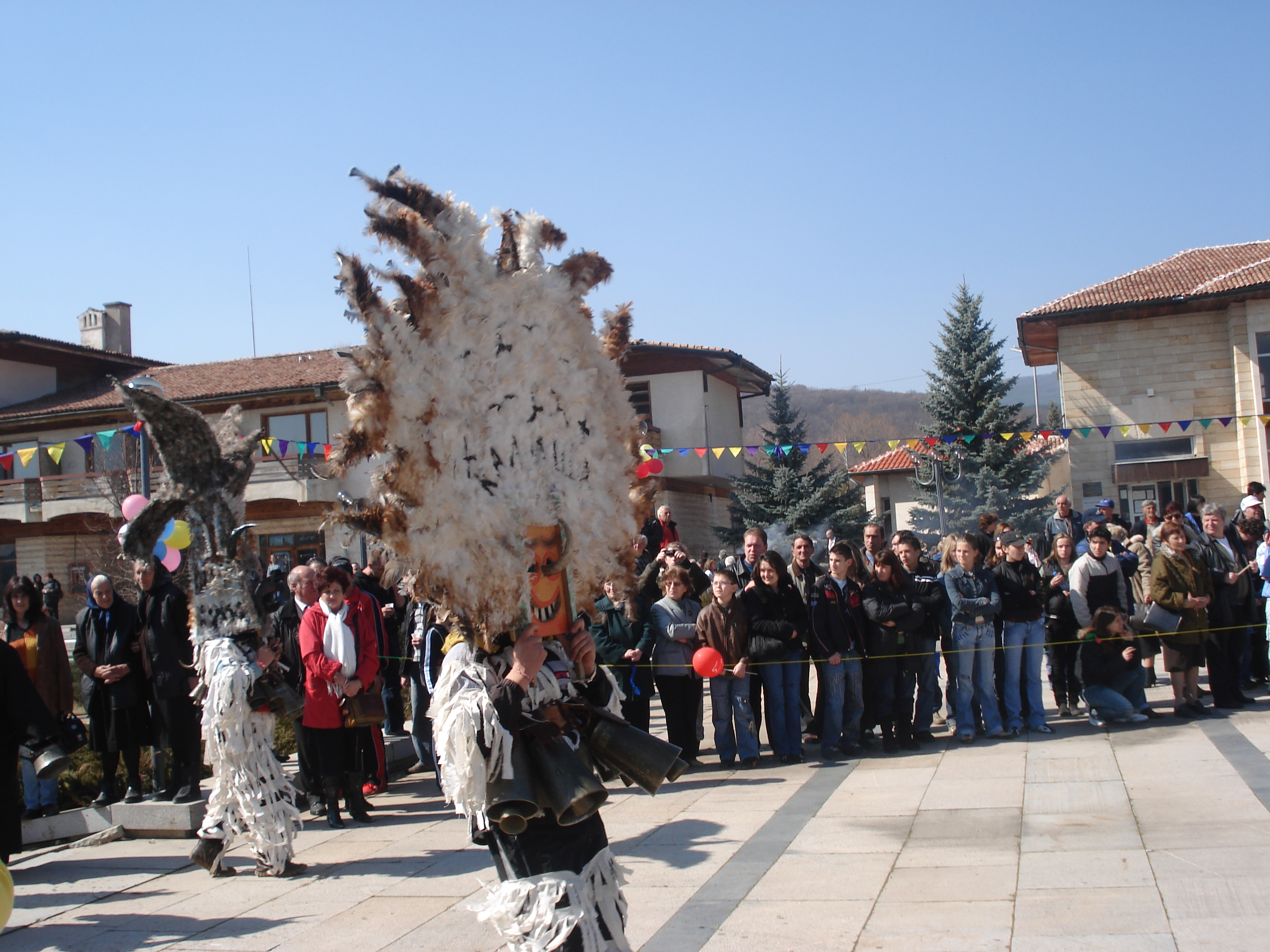
Kukeri in Kalishte during Survaki

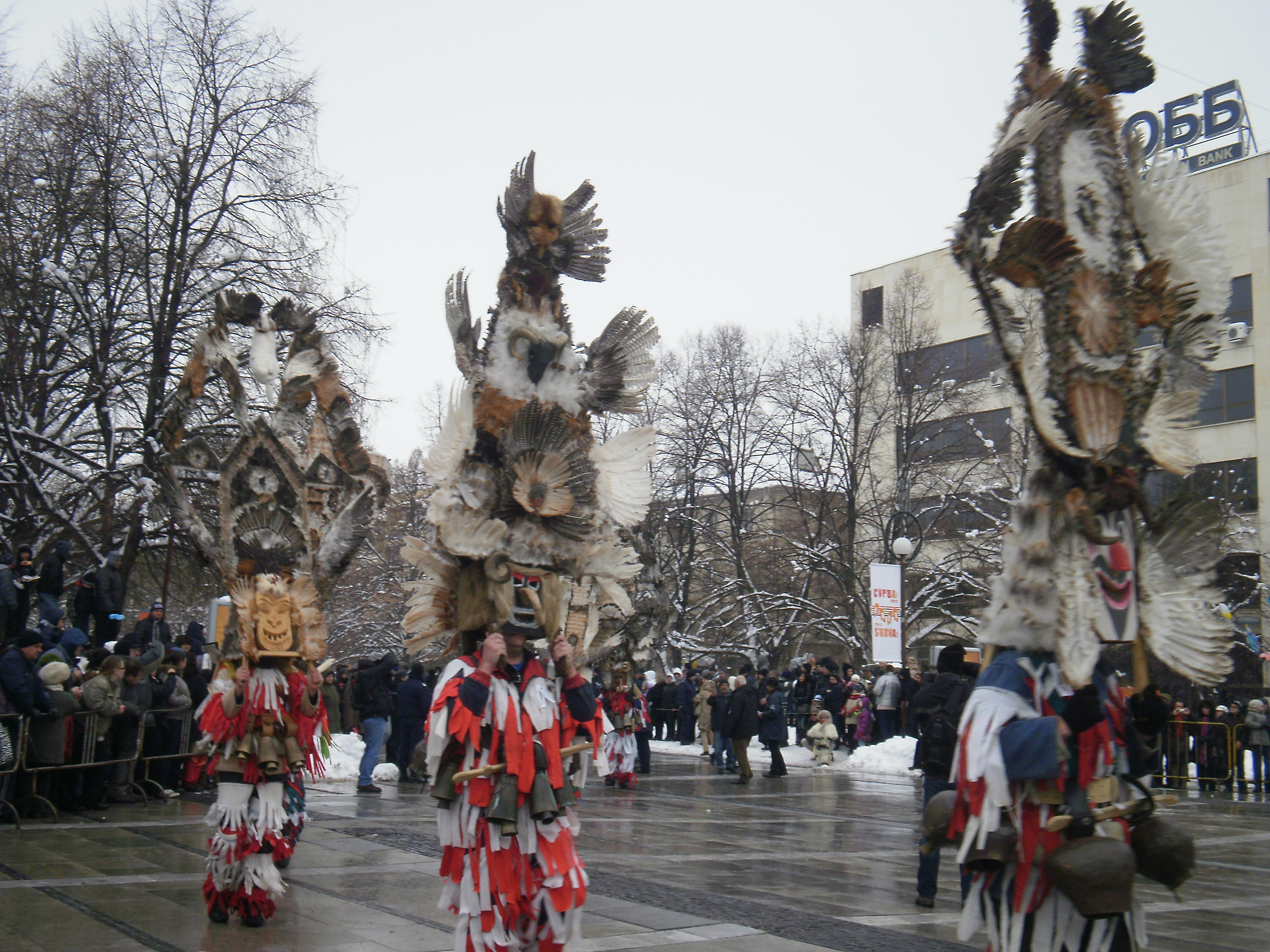
Kukeri in Begunovti during Survaki in 2012

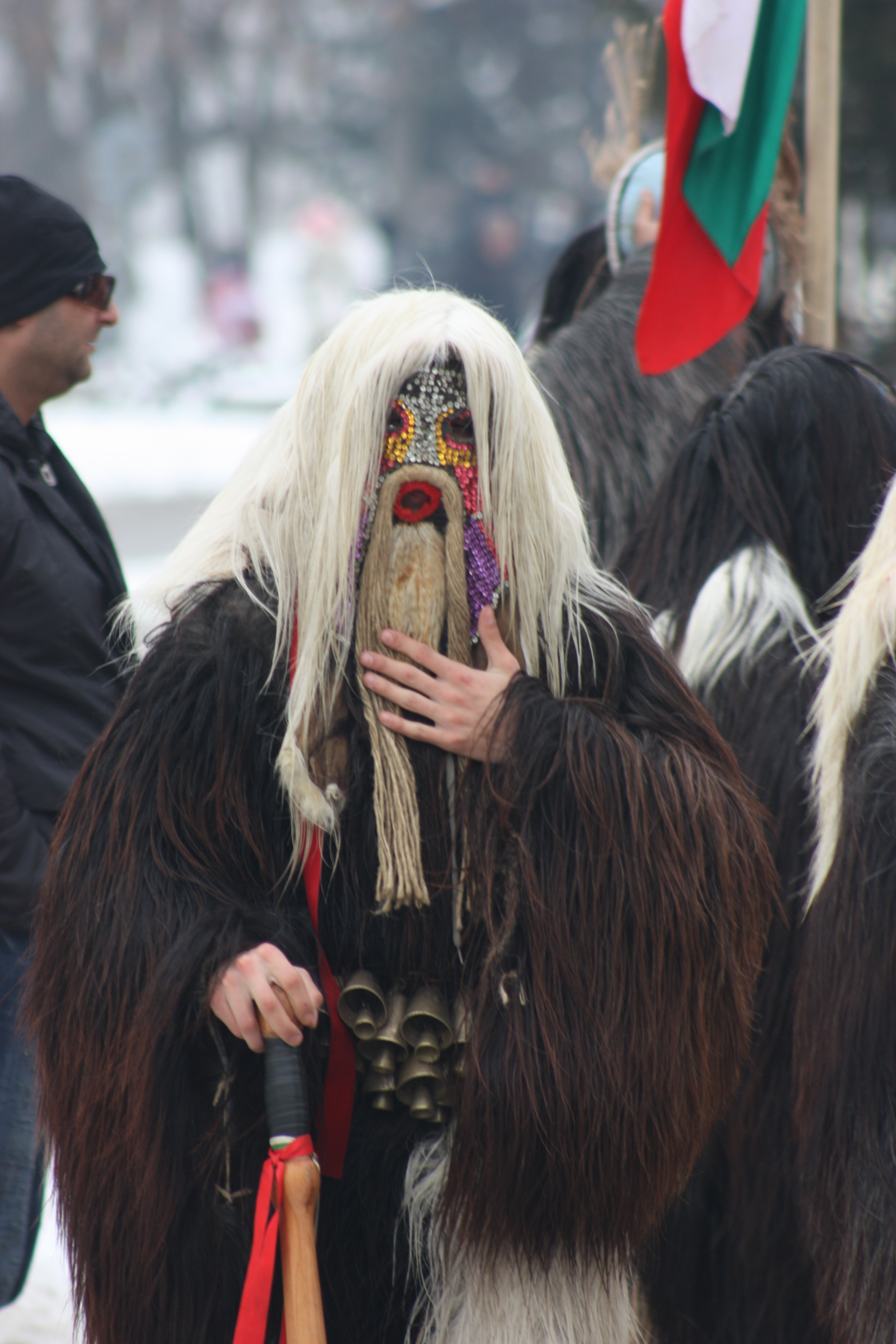
Kuker in Burgas

== See also ==
- Acta Dasii
- Busójárás
- Capra (goat dance)
- Careto
- Kalogeros (folk custom)
- Kourbania
- Kukeri Nunataks
- Kurentovanje
- Mari Lwyd
- Phallic processions
- Slavic Carnival
- Surva Festival
- Survakane
- Turoń
- Zvončari
