= Candle-pole =

Slovenian festival item

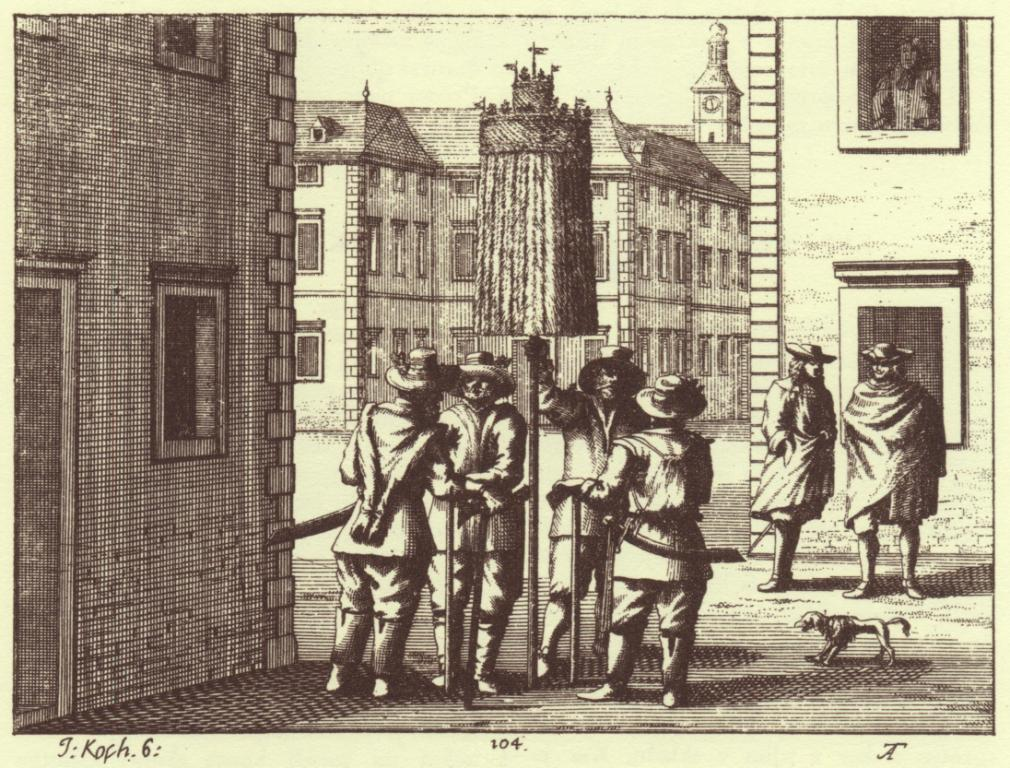
Candle-pole carriers in Ljubljana (Valvasor, 1689)

A candle-pole (Slovene: stavnica) was a pole with candles that was traditionally brought by several villages on Candlemas (2 February) to the parish church in the southeastern part of Upper Carniola (northern Slovenia). The tradition was described and depicted by Johann Weikhard von Valvasor in the seventh volume of The Glory of the Duchy of Carniola (1689). The candle-pole consisted of a round and vividly coloured pole with three compartments, which had holes for numerous candles and the diameter of which decreased from the bottom up. It was decorated with small flags and various ornaments and jewellery. The money for the candle-pole was collected by koledari (koledniki), singers who went from door to door. It was brought to the church by the strongest young man from the villages that created it, accompanied by other strong villagers. The tradition lasted until the first quarter of the 19th century, except for Komenda, where it lasted until ca. 1850 and in Kaplja Vas even later.
