= Meteņi =

Ancient Latvian holiday

Meteņi (Latvian pronunciation: [met̪eɲi]) or Metenis is an ancient Latvian spring waiting holiday, that ends on Ash Wednesday, which is followed by Lent. Meteņi is celebrated in February or early March, seven weeks before Lieldienas.

== Origins ==
The Meteņi celebration preserved the ancient traditions of New Year's Eve, because ancient Indo-European people celebrated New Year's Eve in mid-February. This came from the early Latvian word "meti", which meant turn of time, gauge. The original meaning is preserved in the word "laikmets" (era). Lithuanian word "metai" even now means "year".

== Name in other languages ==
In Livonian populated regions and Riga, this celebration is known as Fastelavn (possibly originating from German Fastnacht - hunger night). Elsewhere, it is also called Lastavāgs, Aizgavēnis, Miesmetis, Buduļi Eve, and Pie Day. Lithuanians call it užgavėnės, while Estonians call it vastlapäev. To Russians and other Orthodox Christian peoples this festival is known as Maslenitsa (Russian: Масленица, Belarusian: масьленіца, Ukrainian: масниця).

Elsewhere in Europe and America, this festival coincides with the carnival time and referred to as Shrove Tuesday (French: Mardi Gras, German: Fastnachtsdienstag, Italian: Martedì grasso, English: Shrove Tuesday) or "Pancake Day". In Latin countries, it is called carnival, carnaval or "meat balls", and it is the holiday of overeating, after which comes Lent. It is also has a connection with Roman Empire's time to celebrate traditions of April Fools' Day on April 1. During it happens a mask parade (masquerade), all sorts of performances, and immoderate blowout and drinking. To bid a farewell to Winter, they burned a year-old allegorical serpent or dragon, straw dolls, and logs, whose ashes are spread across the land so that the New Year would be fruitful.

== Holiday traditions ==
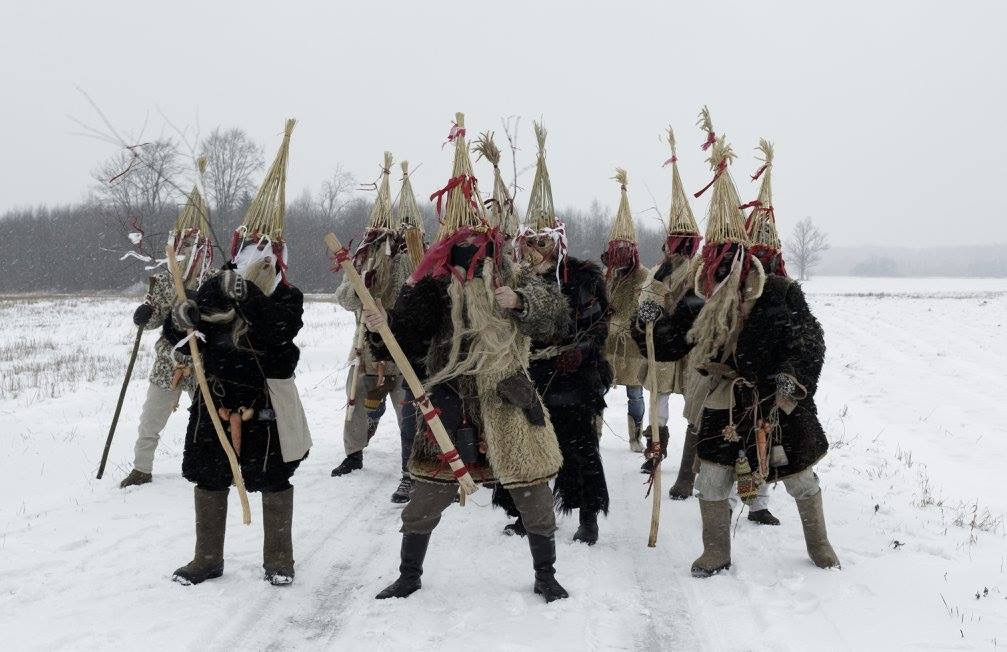
Meteņi ķekatas mask group of Zemgale and Kurzeme called Budēļi, Buduļi or Būduļi.

Meteņi is about people eating and drinking as much as they wanted. During this time pigs were slaughtered, so the traditional holiday dishes were pig's head and fritters. Parents threw gifts to their children from above the room, as if Laima threw her gifts from above the heaven. As with every winter holiday, ķekatas were traveling the country and paid visits to people. There is a belief that the longer Meteņi is celebrated, the better the harvest is expected following summer. The Solstice bonfire is burned while performing rituals of tying a witch's tongue and donations. The campfire is used to burn last summer's Jāņi festive wreaths. The straw is often burned and in some places, the straws are handmade into characters, which is primarily removed from hills and then burned to drive winter away.

== See also ==
- Užgavėnės
- Maslenitsa
