= Mummering =

British, Irish, and Canadian folk custom

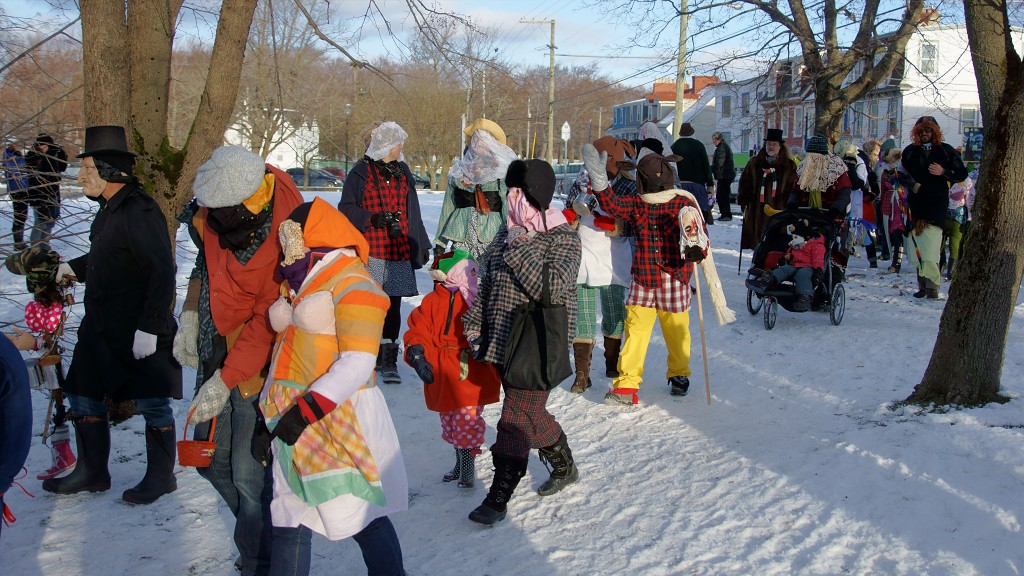
2013 St John's Mummers Parade

Mummering is a Christmas-time house-visiting tradition practiced in Newfoundland and Labrador, Ireland, Philadelphia, and parts of the United Kingdom.

Also known as mumming or janneying, it typically involves a group of friends or family who dress in disguise and visit homes within their community or neighboring communities during the twelve days of Christmas. If the mummers are welcomed into a house, they often do a variety of informal performances that may include dance, music, jokes, or recitations. The hosts must guess the mummers' identities before offering them food or drink. They may poke and prod the mummers or ask them questions. To make this a challenge for the hosts, the mummers may stuff their costumes, cross-dress, or speak while inhaling (ingressive speech). Once the mummers have been identified, they remove their disguises, spend some social time with the hosts, and then travel as a group to the next home.

== Local seasonal variants ==
=== Newfoundland mummers ===
An old Christmas custom from England and Ireland, mummering in a version of its modern form can be traced back in Newfoundland into the 19th century. Although it is unclear precisely when this tradition was brought to Newfoundland by the English and Irish, the earliest record dates back to 1819. Some state that the tradition was brought to Newfoundland by Irish immigrants from County Wexford. The tradition varied, and continues to vary, from community to community. Some formal aspects of the tradition, such as the mummers play, have largely died out, with the informal house-visiting remaining the predominant form.

Sometime during the Twelve Days of Christmas, usually on the night of the "Old Twelfth" (17 January; equivalent to 6 January in the old Julian calendar), people would disguise themselves with old articles of clothing and visit the homes of their friends and neighbours. They would at times cover their faces with a hood, scarf, mask or pillowcase to keep their identity hidden. In keeping with the theme of an inversion of rules, and of disguise, crossdressing was a common strategy, and men would sometimes dress as women and women as men. Travelling from house to house, some mummers would carry their own musical instruments to play, sing and dance in the houses they visited. The host and hostess of these 'mummers parties' would serve a small lunch which could consist of Christmas cake with a glass of syrup or blueberry or dogberry wine. Some mummers would drink a Christmas "grog" before they leave each house, a drink of an alcoholic beverage such as rum or whiskey. One important part of the custom was a guessing game to determine the identity of the visitors. As each mummer was identified, they would uncover their faces, but if their true identity is not guessed they did not have to unmask. The Mummers Festival takes place throughout December and includes workshops on how to make hobby horses and wren sticks.

On June 25, 1861, an "Act to make further provisions for the prevention of Nuisances" was introduced in response to the death of Isaac Mercer in Bay Roberts. Mercer had been murdered by a group of masked mummers on December 28, 1860. The Bill made it illegal to wear a disguise in public without permission of the local magistrate. Mummering in rural communities continued despite the passage of the Bill, although the practice did die out in larger towns and cities.

In the 1980s, mummering experienced a revival, thanks to the locally popular musical duo Simani, who wrote and recorded "Any Mummers Allowed In?" (commonly referred to as "The Mummer's Song") in 1982. Folklorist Dr. Joy Fraser has noted that, "in common with many other folk revivals, the resurgence of Christmas mummering in Newfoundland is largely based on a selective and idealised conceptualisation of the custom. As part of this revival, one particular form of mummering - the informal house-visit described above - has come to represent the custom in Newfoundland as a whole, while other forms that were equally prominent in the island’s cultural history have received comparatively little attention."

In 2009, the Heritage Foundation of Newfoundland and Labrador's Intangible Cultural Heritage office established what would become an annual Mummers Festival, culminating in a Mummers Parade in St. John's. The success of the festival has influenced, in part, another revitalization and increase of interest in the tradition in the province.

=== Philadelphia mummers ===
Mummers' plays were performed in Philadelphia in the 18th century as part of a wide variety of working-class street celebrations around Christmas. By the early 19th century, it coalesced with two other New Year customs, shooting firearms, and the Pennsylvania German custom of "belsnickling" (adults in masks questioning children about whether they had been good during the previous year). Through the 19th century, large groups of disguised (often in blackface) working class young men roamed the streets on New Year's Day, organizing "riotous" processions, firing weapons into the air, and demanding free drinks in taverns, and generally challenging middle and upper-class notions of order and decorum. Unable to suppress the custom, by the 1880s the city government began to pursue a policy of co-option, requiring participants to join organized groups with designated leaders who had to apply for permits and were responsible for their groups actions. By 1900, these groups formed part of an organized, city-sanctioned parade with cash prizes for the best performances. About 15,000 mummers now perform in the parade each year. They are organized into four distinct types of troupes: Comics, Fancies, String Bands, and Fancy Brigades. All dress in elaborate costumes. There is a Mummers Museum dedicated to the history of Philadelphia Mummers.

== See also ==
- Ugly stick
- Koliada
- Ķekatas
- Mummers Parade
