= Jānis Alberts Jansons =

Latvian folklorist, literary scholar and educator (1892–1971)

Jānis Alberts Jansons ( 5 April 1892 – 22 March 1971) was a Latvian folklorist, literary scholar and educator.

== Works ==
1933: Die lettischen Maskenumzüge und ihre kulturhistorische Bedeutung (Latvian masked processions and their cultural-historical significance) (Ph.D. thesis)

== Awards ==
- Krišjānis Barons prize (1929, 1933, 1935, 1936)
- Order of the Three Stars (V class, 1933)
