= Kalishte =

Bulgarian village

Coordinates: 42°29′N 22°50′E

Kalishte Калище
- Village
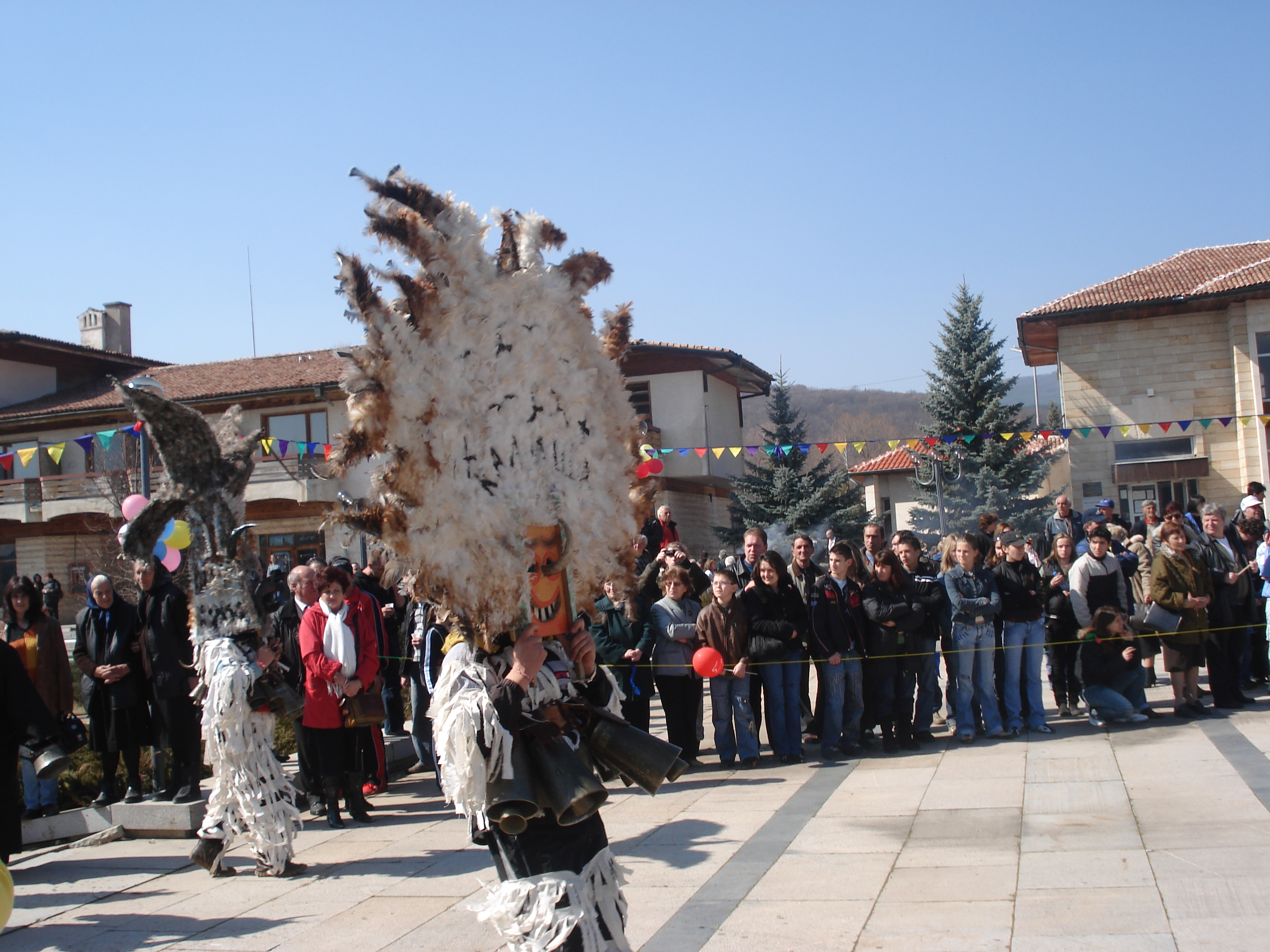
- Interactive map of Kalishte
- Country: Bulgaria
- Oblast: Pernik
- Opština: Kovachevtsi

Government
  - Mayor (Municipality): Vasil Stanimirov (BSP)

Area
  - Total: 28.604 km^{2} (11.044 sq mi)
- Elevation: 606 m (1,988 ft)

Population (2024)
  - Total: 351
  - Density: 12.3/km^{2} (31.8/sq mi)
- Postal code: 2431
- Area code: 07742
- Vehicle registration: РК

Kalista (Bulgarian: Калище) is a village in mid-western Bulgaria. Kalista is located within the jurisdiction of the nearby city Radomir, Pernik Province, at an average elevation of 661 meters above the sea level.
