= Korochun =

Slavic winter solstice holiday

Koročun or Kračun (see other variants below) is one of the names for the time of the year that corresponds to Christmas in several Slavic languages such as Pannonian Rusyn, as well as the common name for the holiday in Romania and Hungary. It also refers to an evil spirit which shortens one's life, in particular bringing a sudden death, as in the curse "Let Karachun take you!" (Russian: Карачун тебя возьми!).

== Names and etymology ==
- Belarusian: Карачун, Karačun;
- Bulgarian: Крачон, Kračon or Крачунек, Kračunek;
- Czech: Kračun;
- Macedonian: Крачун, Kračun;
- Old Еast Slavic: Корочунъ, Koročunŭ;
- Russian: Корочун, Koročun or Карачун, Karačun;
- Carpatho-Rusyn: К(е)речун, K(e)rečun or Ґ(е)речун, G(e)rečun;
- Pannonian Rusyn: Крачун, Kračun;
- Serbian: Крачун, Kračun;
- Slovak: Kračún;
- Hungarian: Karácsony;
- Romanian: Crăciun.

Max Vasmer derived the name of from the Proto-Slavic *korčunŭ, which is in turn derived from the verb *korčati, meaning to step forward. Gustav Weigand, Alexandru Cihac and Alexandru Philippide offer a similar Slavic etymology, based on kratŭkŭ (curt, short) or kračati (to make steps). The etymology of steps is usually favored, as it shows a liminal or transitional quality to the holiday as the solstice approached and a new solar cycle began. Similarly, Árpád Kosztin, along with Alain and André Du Nay, argue that the Romanian and Hungarian terms are most likely Slavic loanwords. On the other hand, Hugo Schuchardt, Vatroslav Jagić, and Luka Pintar proposed a Romanian origin of the word, as does also the Romanian Etymological Dictionary, tracing its roots back to the Latin creatio,-nis.

== Religious and mythological significance ==
Koročun or Kračun was a pre-Christian Slavic holiday. It was considered the day when the progenitor deity (usually Veles) and other spirits associated with darkness were most potent. The first recorded usage of the term was in 1143, when the author of the Novgorod First Chronicle referred to the winter solstice as "Koročun".

It was celebrated by Slavs around December 20/21, the longest night of the year and the night of the winter solstice. On this night, the old sun becomes smaller and dies as the days become shorter in the Northern Hemisphere, and is said in Christianized traditions to die on December 24. On December 21 or 25, the sun is resurrected and becomes the young god, usually associated with Svarozhits or Dazhbog.

Modern scholars tend to associate this holiday with ancestor worship. On this day, Western Slavs lit fires at cemeteries to keep their loved ones warm, and organized feasts to honor the dead and keep them fed. They also lit wooden logs at local crossroads. In some Slavic languages, the word came to denote unexpected death of a young person and the evil spirit that shortens life.

== See also ==
- Crăciun (disambiguation)
