= Petre Crăciun =

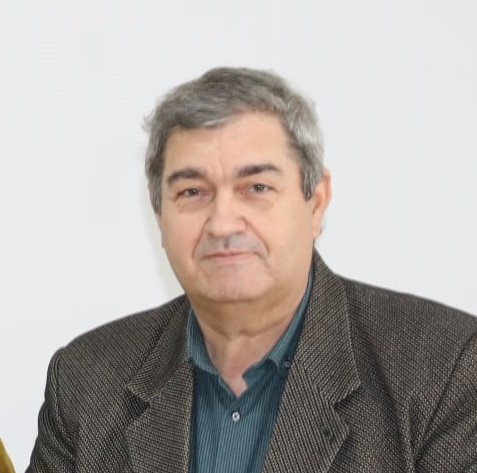
- Petre Crăciun, 2022
- Born: August 29, 1962 (age 64); Giurgiu, Romania
- Education: University of Bucharest
- Occupations: Children's book writer, journalist, documentary filmmaker, TV show producer
- Writing career
- Period: 1990–present
- Genres: Children's literature, fairy tales, poetry, essays, novels
- Notable works: *Fairy Tales* (Basme, 2013); *With Andersen in the Kingdom of Tales* (Cu Andersen în Regatul Poveștilor, 2015)
- Notable awards: Romanian Writers' Union Award (2015)

Petre Crăciun (born August 29, 1962) is a Romanian children's book writer, journalist, documentary filmmaker, and TV show producer.

== Biography ==
Petre Crăciun was born in Giurgiu. He graduated from the Faculty of History and Philosophy of the University of Bucharest. After that he taught history, wrote articles for the media, made documentary films, and created programs for TVR. He started writing poems for children in 1990. In 1991 he wrote his first fairy tale. He founded the publishing house Editura Zorio, where most of his books are published.

== Awards ==
Romanian Writers' Union Award for 2015, in the Children's and Youth Books section, for the volume "With Andersen in the Kingdom of Tales" (Cu Andersen in Regatul Poveștilor), 2015; the Book of the Year Award for 2013, for the volume "Fairy Tales" (Basme), offered by the Children's and Youth Branch of the Romanian Writers' Union, 2014; the Iași Writers' Association's First Prize at the "Ion Creangă" Story Contest, organized together with the Iași Literature Museum and Bojdeuca from Țicău – 1997. The winning story: The Flower of Wisdom and the Grass of Power (Floarea înțelepciunii și iarba puterii); Two books nominated for the USR Awards – Children's Books: Fairy Tales and The Crusade of the Cats (Cruciada pisicilor) (2014); the prize of the "Ion Creangă" Library, from Chisinau, for the volume "The Flower Girl" (Fetița din Floare), awarded on the occasion of the Chisinau International Book Fair, 20th edition, 2016; laureate of the Itsy Bitsy Radio station, in the Children's Literature section, the Excellence Awards for 2017.

== Books ==
- Cureaua cu ținte, Editura Neroandria, 1995, roman;
- Alarmă la Peleș, Editura Grafică Prahoveană, 1996, roman;
- Poveștile de la bojdeucă, Editura Junimea, 1997, volum colectiv de povești;
- Cuvânt dinlăuntru, Editura Premier, 2001, eseuri;
- Floarea înțelepciunii și iarba puterii, Editura Timpolis, 2002, povești.
- În spatele oglinzii, Editura Fed, 2003, versuri;
- Alege viața, interviuri, Editura Codecs, 2004, interviuri cu consumatori de droguri;
- Taina ghemului de ață, poezii pentru copii, Editura ZORIO, 2011
- Complexul sălii de așteptare, eseuri, Editura ZORIO, 2012
- Cândva mă chema Codiță, povestire pentru copii, Editura ZORIO, 2012
- Cruciada pisicilor, versuri pentru copii, Editura ZORIO, 2012
- Unde-i victima, domnule Atanasiu?, Editura Zorio, 2012, policier
- Alarmă la Peleș, ediția a II-a, Editura Zorio, 2013, policier
- Basme, Editura Zorio, 2013
- Robert cel cuminte, roman pentru copii, părinți și bunici, Editura Zorio, 2014
- Primul zbor, poezii pentru copii, Editura Zorio, 2014
- Fetița din Floare, povestire pentru copii, Editura Zorio, 2014
- Basme pentru familia mea, Editura Zorio, 2014
- Cu Moș Crăciun în Țara Copiilor Neîncrezători, 2014
- Cu Andersen în Regatul Poveștilor, 2015
- Împăratul-Copil. Povești în versuri, 2015.
- Povestiri despre România, Țara părinților, 2015.
- Ghiozdanul cu poezii, 2016
- The Girl in the Rose, 2016 (traducere de Adrian G. Săhlean)
- Cartea basmelor. Antologie, Editura Zorio, 2017
- Când cimpanzeul devine om, Editura Zorio, 2017
- Aripi de rouă, 2018
- Poveștile-flori și poveștile-stele, Editura Zorio, 2018
- Regatul cuvintelor - revistă trimestrială pentru copii a Editurii Zorio, 2018
- Alegerea berzei. Misiunea 1511. Editura Zorio, 2019
- Cruciada pisicilor (in Braille), in collaboration with the Romanian Association of the Blind, Editura Zorio, 2019
- Mimu, pisicuța care mânca povești ( Braille), in collaboration with the Romanian Association of the Blind, Editura Zorio, 2019
- 100 de basme și povești: Odaia fericirii, Editura Zorio, 2020
- Roboțeii, povești moderne. Editura Zorio, 2020
- Povești moderne, ediție bilingvă româno-bulgară. Editura Zorio, 2021
- Istoria și catalogul stilourilor românești, Editura Zorio, 2022
- Drumul până în Rai și înapoi, Editura Zorio, 2023
