= Monica Craciun =

British-Romanian physicist and academic

Monica Felicia Craciun
- Born: Romania
- Education: University of Bucharest; Delft University of Technology
- Scientific career
- Fields: Two-dimensional materials Organic materials Electronic devices Optoelectronics
- Workplaces: University of Exeter; University of Twente; University of Tokyo
- Website: engineering.exeter.ac.uk/staff/mfc204

Monica Felicia Crăciun is a British-Romanian physicist who is a professor of Nanoscience at the university of Exeter. Her research investigates 2D Materials for civil engineering, wearable technologies and optoelectronic devices. Craciun has pioneered the incorporation of graphene into concrete, wearable technologies and optoelectronic devices.

== Early life and education ==
Craciun was born in Romania. She completed her MSc in Applied Physics at the University of Bucharest, where she majored in applied physics. She holds two other masters diplomas, in materials physics and engineering. She moved to the Delft University of Technology for her doctoral research.

== Research and career ==
Craciun was a postdoctoral researcher in both the University of Twente and University of Tokyo. Craciun joined the University of Exeter in 2010. In 2014, she was selected as one of eight recipients of the EPSRC Engineering Fellowships for Growth, during which she explored 2D materials for smart coatings. She was promoted to Professor in 2017.

Craciun has developed 2D materials for optoelectronic devices, wearable technologies, civil engineering and quantum sciences. She pioneered several strategies to control the electronic properties of graphene through functionalisation (e.g. the incorporation of fluorine atoms). She worked to improve the techniques used to produce graphene, and showed that a resistive-heating cold-wall chemical vapor deposition approach was considerably faster and cheaper than typical processes. The cold-wall system is common to semiconductor manufacturing industries. Craciun's approach (so-called nanoCVD) uses a cold-wall reactor with a resistive heating stage. She showed that this strategy to make graphene could enable the fabrication of a flexible transparent electronic device for a touch-based sensor technology.

Craciun showed that graphene-based electronic threads could be woven in to polypropylene fibres for wearable technologies.

Craciun created a novel form of concrete that was reinforced with graphene. The incoporation of graphene resulted in concrete that was more water resistant and strong, as well as having a lesser environmental impact. NBC News dubbed the material a "game-changer" for the construction industry. She created a company, Concrene, based on this technology in 2018. The first graphene-enhanced concrete came to market in 2021.

Craciun was appointed Chair of the 2D Materials interest group of the Engineering and Physical Sciences Research Council Materials for Quantum Network in 2022. She has spoken about 2D materials in a TEDxTalk in Truro.

=== Selected publications ===
- Monica Felicia Craciun; Saverio Russo; M Yamamoto; J B Oostinga; A F Morpurgo; S Tarucha (2009). "Trilayer graphene is a semimetal with a gate-tunable band overlap". Nature Nanotechnology. 4 (6): 383–388. doi:10.1038/nnano.2009.89. PMID 19498401. Wikidata Q34017875.
- Jianting Ye; Monica F Craciun; Mikito Koshino; et al. (2011). "Accessing the transport properties of graphene and its multilayers at high carrier density". Proceedings of the National Academy of Sciences of the United States of America. 108 (32): 13002–13006. arXiv:1010.4679. Bibcode:2011PNAS..10813002Y. doi:10.1073/pnas.1018388108. PMC 3156196. PMID 21828007. Wikidata Q35164745.
- Ivan Khrapach; Freddie Withers; Thomas H Bointon; Dmitry K Polyushkin; William L Barnes; Saverio Russo; Monica Felicia Craciun (2012). "Novel highly conductive and transparent graphene-based conductors". Advanced Materials. 24 (21): 2844–2849. arXiv:1206.0001. doi:10.1002/adma.201200489. PMC 3715101. PMID 22535615. Wikidata Q43086775.
