= Turoń =

Creature in Polish folklore

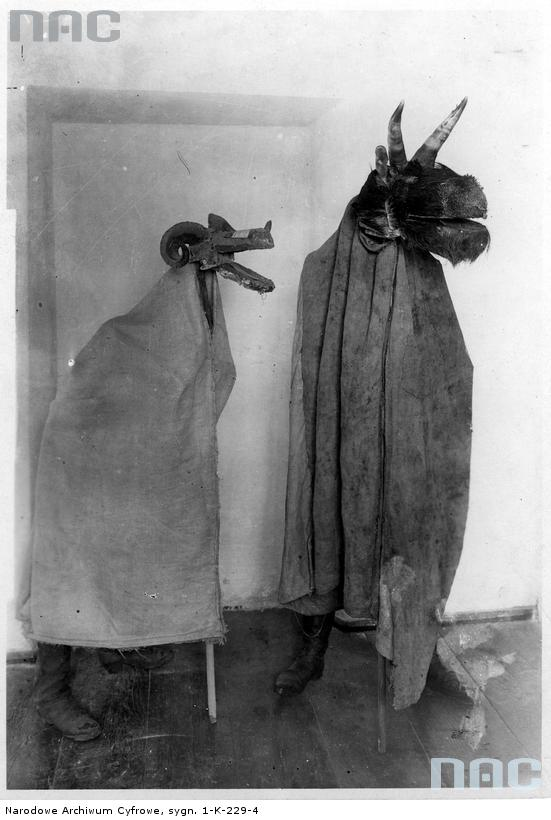
Turons, 1926

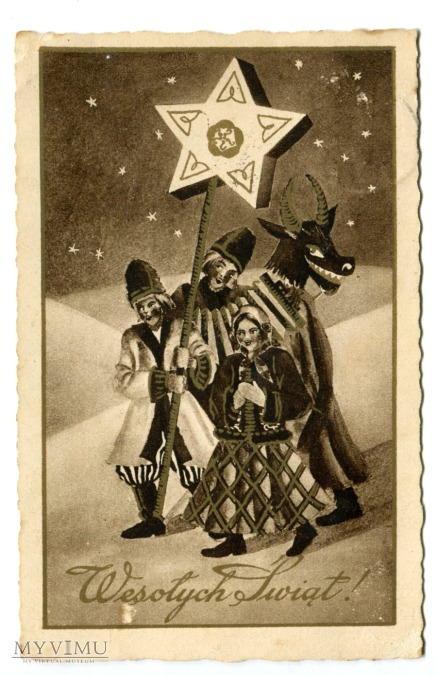
Kolęda walkers with a Turoń

In Polish and Slovak folklore, Turoń or Turoň is a festive monstrosity in the form of a black, horned and shaggy animal with a flopping jaw. Its appearance can be noticed at folk events during the period after Christmas, yet most likely in times of Carnival and before Lent begins. The name is derived from the word tur, meaning aurochs.

== Customs ==
The person that played Turoń covered himself with a cloth sheet or sheep skin, holding a wooden pole in front of him, topped with a bull's head with flopping jaw, horns (sometimes real ones – bovine – or simply, wooden ones), the head covered with rabbit skin or some other animal skin.

Turoń walks hunched over or is led on a rope.

Whenever the caroler group entered a house, Turoń jumps around, dancing and neighing like a donkey. Turoń is especially fond of playing tricks on women, whom he chases around the house, provokes and sometimes hits with its jaw. During the carol singing Turoń claps his jaw to the rhythm of the song and rings the bell on its neck.

Turoń's muzzle is made of thin wood, covered with rabbit skin and is big so it can swallow an apple whole or drink a glass of vodka in one shot. It is believed that the alcohol, consumed by the beast in nearly every visited household, makes its behavior insolent. Turoń holds two sticks which he uses to smack the floor with every move, jumping over them and over the stools in the house as well.

At some point an important moment in singing: the Turoń faints, and then everyone tries to resuscitate it by massage, lighting hay as a kind of an incense, blowing wind under its tail, pouring vodka into the muzzle of effigy and undoing hexes. Turoń recovers and begins to frolic again, which often announces the end of the visit.

In each region of Poland, Turoń differs in form. Cracow's Turoń accompanies the carolers that are carrying a star during the Epiphany (6th of January). It follows the carolers and when they enter a household, Turoń tackles anyone who stares for too long at the star or its bearers.

In Kielce County, city folk walk around the village with an aurochs (also called as "turuń") during the last week of Carnival. A similar custom is known in Tarnów, where the Turoń is accompanied by other figures: Tatar (Turkish man) and Żyd (Jew). In Mielec, people walk with Turoń on Christmas Eve.

Whenever the Turoń becomes unbearable for the householder and his family, they sing a song to banish it:

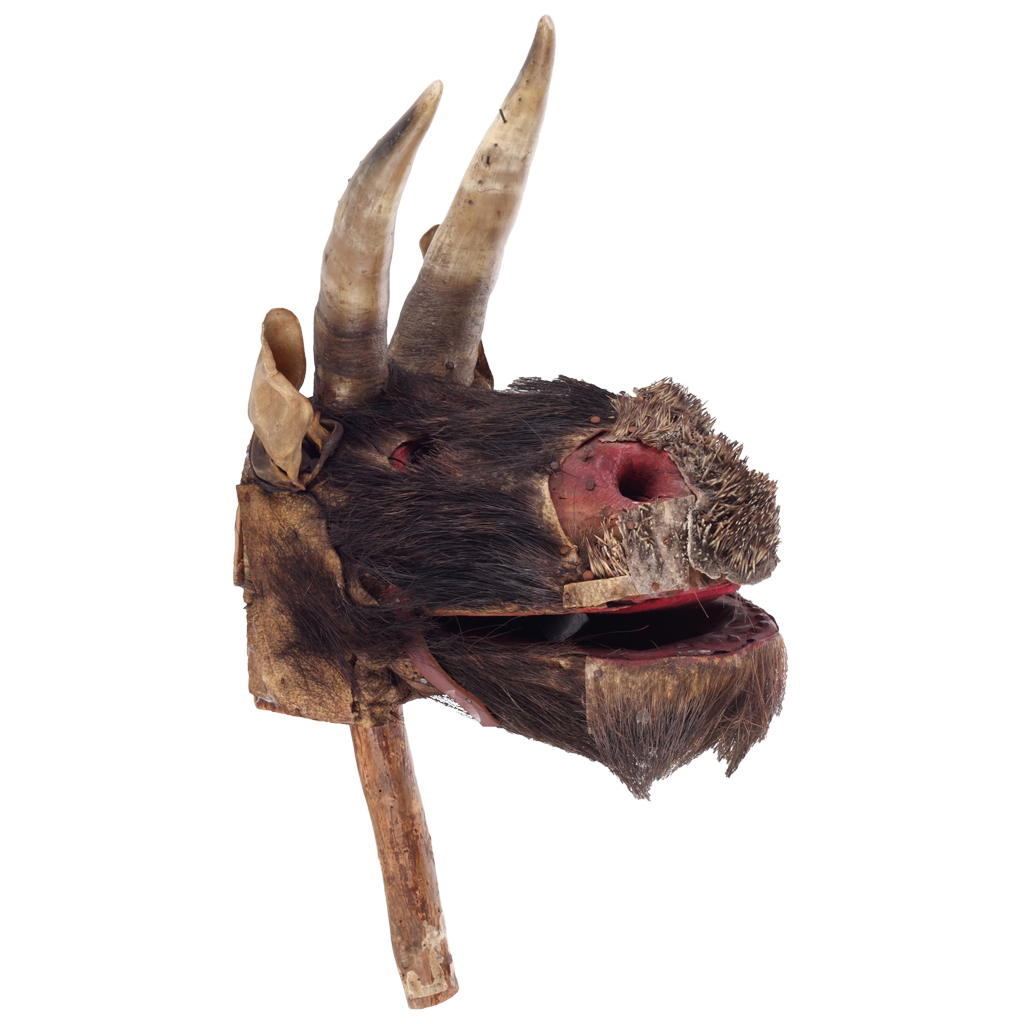
Turoń's head from Stary Sącz

Idź, turoniu, do domu
nie zawadzaj nikomu
nie tuś się wychował
nie tu będziesz nocował

Which loosely translates as:

Go now, Turoń, go home
Don't you bother any more souls
Here's not the place you live
This not the place you shall sleep

After that song, the householder gives to the carolers a "get off ransom" in the form of money and a gift from the pantry. Then, the carolers thank for the treats and they go to the next house.

== Etymology ==
According to Oskar Kolberg: "I recall a research about aurochs, brought up by a German – Harius. Aurochs as an animal is a foreign name to the eastern languages and it refers to a bull – hence it belongs to terminology and customs of pagan Slavic culture, in which the aurochs was an emblem of the Sun and in its name there was a holiday called Turzyce. Nonetheless Turuń has to be considered as such; since the day of Christmas a new Sun is born, brighter and longer it shines with coming of a new summer."

== Symbolism ==
Turoń is a symbol of fertility, a way of wishing through gestures. It pokes the householders with his horns to pass on the fertility.

== See also ==
- Krampus – a related figure in Central European folklore

== Sources ==
- Kolberg, Oskar (1871). Dzieła wszystkie, tom 5, Krakowskie cz.I. Kraków: Drukarnia Uniwersytetu Jagiellońskiego.
