= Lingura =

- Commune and village
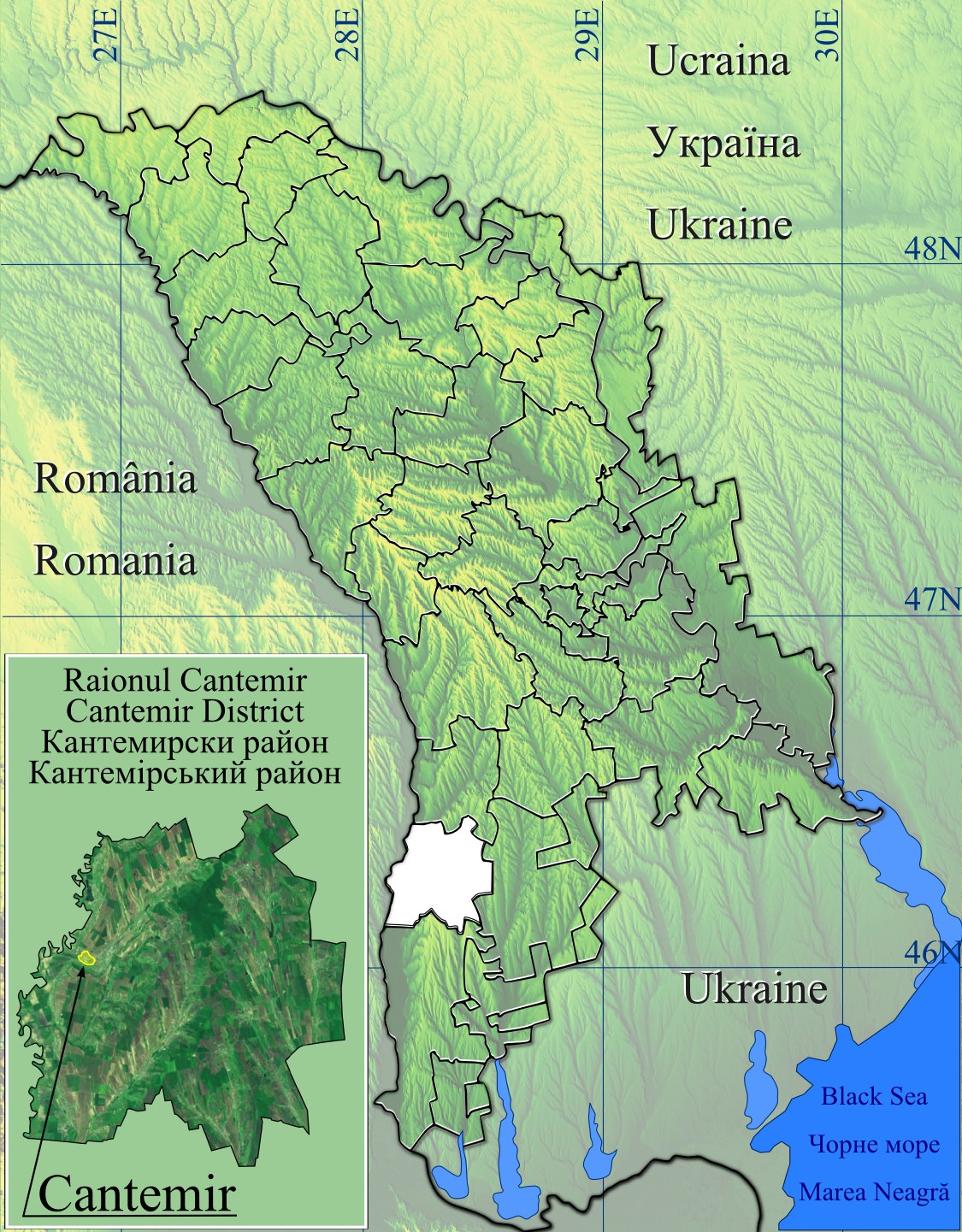
- Location in Moldova
- Coordinates: 46°14′N 28°19′E
- Country: Moldova
- District: Cantemir District

Population (2014)
  - Total: 1,457
- Time zone: UTC+2 (EET)
  - Summer (DST): UTC+3 (EEST)

Lingura is a commune in Cantemir District, Moldova. It is composed of three villages: Crăciun, Lingura and Popovca.
