= 100 Years of Nine Lessons and Carols =

2018 double album by the Choir of King's College, Cambridge

Live album / Studio album by Choir of King's College, Cambridge
- Released: November 2018
- Recorded: 1958–2017
- Venue: King's College Chapel, Cambridge
- Genre: Choral music
- Length: 106 minutes 26 seconds
- Label: King's College Recordings
- Producer: Various

100 Years of Nine Lessons and Carols is a double album by the Choir of King's College, Cambridge released to mark 100 years since the first festival of nine lessons and carols service was held in King's College Chapel, Cambridge. One disc contains recordings of live performances from the BBC Radio broadcasts of the services from the period 1958 to 2017, while the second contains newly recorded versions of works previously performed at the service.

The album debuted at number 1 in the UK Classical music chart on 22 November 2018, a position it retained for 9 weeks.

== Track listing ==
Disc 1
No.	Title	Writer(s)	Year Recorded (Conductor)	Length
1.	"Gabriel's Message"	Traditional, arr. Edgar Pettman	1958 (David Willcocks)	2:35
2.	"Adam lay ybounden"	Boris Ord	1963 (David Willcocks)	1:15
3.	"Ding! dong! merrily on high"	XVI Century French, arr. Charles Wood	1963 (David Willcocks)	2:03
4.	"Sussex Carol"	English traditional, arr. David Willcocks	1963 (David Willcocks)	1:53
5.	"O come, all ye faithful"	John Francis Wade, arr. David Willcocks	1963 (David Willcocks)	4:37
6.	"In dulci jubilo"	German trad., arr. Robert Lucas de Pearsall, ed. Reginald Jacques	1980 (Philip Ledger)	3:36
7.	"Unto us is born a Son"	Piae Cantiones, 1582, arr. David Willcocks	1980 (Philip Ledger)	2:16
8.	"Hark! the herald angels sing"	Felix Mendelssohn, arr. Philip Ledger	1978 (Philip Ledger)	3:46
9.	"Illuminare, Jerusalem"	Judith Weir	1985 (Stephen Cleobury)	2:31
10.	"The holly and the ivy"	Traditional, arr. Walford Davies	1994 (Stephen Cleobury)	2:35
11.	"Benedicamus Domino"	Peter Warlock	1994 (Stephen Cleobury)	1:12
12.	"I saw three ships"	Traditional, arr. Simon Preston	1994 (Stephen Cleobury)	2:03
13.	"The Fayrfax Carol"	Thomas Adès	1997 (Stephen Cleobury)	4:23
14.	"Tomorrow shall be my dancing day"	John Gardner	1997 (Stephen Cleobury)	2:18
15.	"I wonder as I wander"	Carl Rütti	2000 (Stephen Cleobury)	1:48
16.	"The Shepherd’s Carol"	Bob Chilcott	2001 (Stephen Cleobury)	2:53
17.	"Dormi, Jesu"	John Rutter	2007 (Stephen Cleobury)	4:29
18.	"Bogoróditse Djévo"	Arvo Pärt	2007 (Stephen Cleobury)	1:09
19.	"This Endernight"	Michael Berkeley	2016 (Stephen Cleobury)	4:07
20.	"Carol Eliseus"	Huw Watkins	2017 (Stephen Cleobury)	2:20
21.	"Once in royal David’s city"	Henry Gauntlett & Arthur Henry Mann, desc. Stephen Cleobury	2017 (Stephen Cleobury)	4:23
Total length:				58:12

Disc 2
No.	Title	Writer(s)	Length
1.	"O Holy Night"	Adolphe Adam, arr. John Rutter	5:38
2.	"The Linden Tree Carol"	Traditional, arr. Stephen Cleobury	3:04
3.	"The Lamb"	John Tavener	3:39
4.	"God rest you merry, gentlemen"	English traditional, arr. David Willcocks	3:39
5.	"The Shepherds’ Farewell"	Hector Berlioz	4:04
6.	"I saw three ships"	Traditional, arr. Philip Ledger	1:50
7.	"We three kings of Orient are"	John Henry Hopkins, arr. Martin Neary	3:07
8.	"Can I not syng but hoy?"	Francis Jackson	3:11
9.	"The Magi’s Dream"	James Whitbourn	3:30
10.	"There is no rose"	John Joubert	2:13
11.	"Adam’s Fall"	Richard Elfyn Jones	3:15
12.	"How shall I fitly meet thee?"	Johann Sebastian Bach	1:07
13.	"Love came down at Christmas"	R O Morris, arr. Stephen Cleobury	1:18
14.	"Break forth, O beauteous heavenly light"	Johann Sebastian Bach	1:15
15.	"O come, all ye faithful"	John Francis Wade, arr. David Willcocks	3:11
16.	"Hark! the herald angels sing"	Felix Mendelssohn, desc. Stephen Cleobury	4:29
Total length:			48:30
