= Great hailstorm of August 1843 =

Weather event in England

The great hailstorm of August 1843 was a hail storm that tracked across central and eastern England on 9 August 1843 causing widespread damage.

The storm arrived at Wimpole around 4 pm:

"the lightning and hail were terrific, the former like sheets of fire filled the air and ran along the ground, the latter as large as pigeon's eggs; some larger and others large angular masses of ice....The destruction of property was dreadful! All the windows on the north side of the Mansion were broken, all the hothouses, and every window facing the north in many of the cottages!...The corn over which it passed was entirely threshed out, boughs and limbs torn off the trees, pigeons and crows killed, many sheep struck by lightning, and what the hail and lightning did not utterly destroy, the rain which fell in torrents finished"

A chorister in the Choir of King's College, Cambridge noted the hailstorm in his memoirs, the storm arriving while the choristers were swimming in the River Cam:

"it had been thundering or rumbling at a distance and looked awfully black, we did not mind and kept on with our swim until the lightning, thunder, and hail became so heavy on a sudden that we scrambled on our shoes and a part of our clothes and carrying the others made a run for the school-room...just before the hailstorm began we made most haste to dress, and then went into the Hall Screens and looked across to the Chapel. The sight has never been from my memory, and if I had never been frightened before I certainly had cause to be at that sight, for the lightning seemed at every flash to strike and threaten the dear old building, and yet there were few, if any, of the windows broken, but the Hall windows were somewhat badly broken, and when the storm had abated some of us got in and had a scramble for the broken glass..."

The following weekend the Cambridge Chronicle noted the impact of the storm:

“To-day it is our painful duty to record a storm of thunder and hail more terrific in its character, and more disastrous in its results, than any by which this district has been visited within the memory of living man, or, indeed, of which history supplies us with an account. Wednesday, the 9th of August, 1843, will hold a conspicuous place in the annals of this and the adjoining counties, and the remembrance of it will never occur without sorrow to the minds of those living, for to many it brought positive ruin, while very few escaped more or less of the injury with which it was fraught. Experience totally fails to supply us with any thing in this latitude approaching the devastation occasioned by the tempest of which we speak, or the terror which it diffused amongst all classes of people during the time of its continuance.”
