= Stephen Cleobury =

English organist and conductor (1948–2019)

Sir Stephen Cleobury CBE
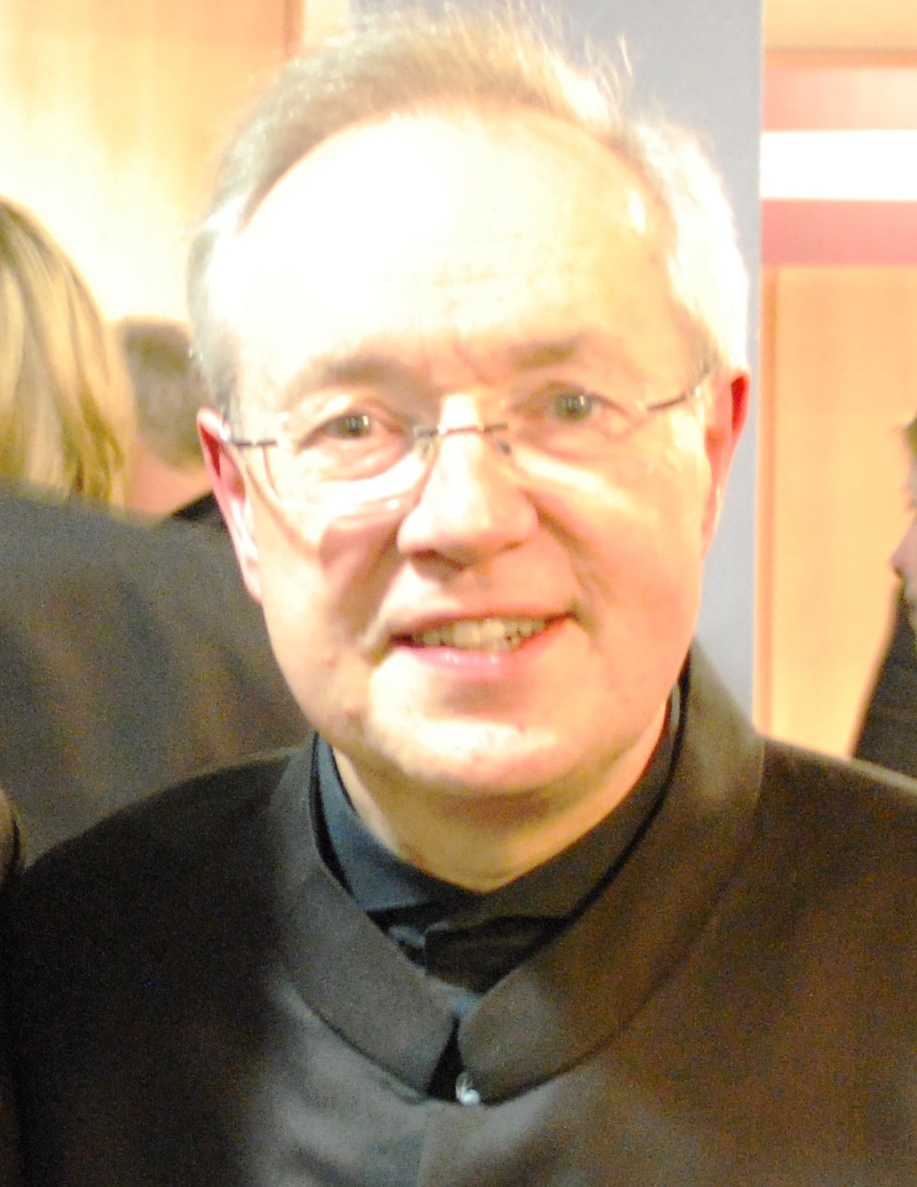
- Cleobury in 2009
- Born: Stephen John Cleobury; 31 December 1948; Bromley, England
- Died: 22 November 2019 (aged 70); York, England
- Education: St John's College, Cambridge (organ scholar)
- Occupations: Director of Music; Organist
- Organizations: King's College, Cambridge; BBC Singers
- Spouses: Penny Holloway (divorced) Emma Disley (m. 2004)
- Children: 4
- Parent(s): John Cleobury; Brenda Randall
- Relatives: Nicholas Cleobury (brother)

Sir Stephen John Cleobury CBE (/ˈkliːbəri/ KLEE-bər-ee; 31 December 1948 – 22 November 2019) was an English organist and music director. He worked with the Choir of King's College, Cambridge, where he served as music director from 1982 to 2019, and with the BBC Singers.

King's College has won worldwide fame for its Christmas music, having performed a live broadcast on the BBC on Christmas Eve since 1928. During his long tenure as Director of Music, Cleobury made the singers even better known by tours and recordings. From 1984 he introduced the commission of a new Christmas carol annually. Among many honours, he was honorary fellow of the Royal School of Church Music, and was appointed Commander of the Order of the British Empire in 2019 before he died of cancer that November at the age of 70.

== Life ==
=== Early years ===
Stephen John Cleobury was born in Bromley, Kent, the son of John F. Cleobury and Brenda J. Randall. He sang as a chorister at Worcester Cathedral under Douglas Guest then Christopher Robinson. He was organ scholar at St John's College, Cambridge, under the musical directorship of George Guest, and sub-organist of Westminster Abbey before becoming the first Anglican master of music at the Catholic Westminster Cathedral in 1979. In the 1970s, he was head of music at both St Matthew's Church, Northampton, and Northampton Grammar School, where he taught music for four years.

=== King's College, Cambridge ===
In 1982 Cleobury succeeded Philip Ledger as Director of Music for the Choir of King's College, Cambridge, where he also taught music. He led the annual Festival of Nine Lessons and Carols at the King's College Chapel on Christmas Eve, which was established in 1918 and broadcast live by the BBC from 1928. Cleobury's most notable contribution was, from 1984, the incorporation of specially commissioned modern works to complement the traditional carols. Among the composers contributing were Thomas Adès, John Tavener and Mark-Anthony Turnage. Harrison Birtwistle's The Gleam, which requires the choristers to stamp their feet and shout, caused some controversy. The high-profile performances of these commissions allowed the widespread dissemination of sophisticated contemporary choral music.

Cleobury introduced singing lessons for the choristers and expanded the repertoire to include more singing in Latin, and composers such as Kodály, Janáček and Arvo Pärt. He established the Festival of Easter at King's and also Concerts at King's, a concert series throughout the year. Recordings were made by the choir's own label beginning in 2012.

He was conductor of Cambridge University Musical Society (CUMS) from 1983 to 2009, and made many recordings with that group including Verdi's Quattro Pezzi Sacri and Goehr's The Death of Moses. As part of the celebrations of the 800th anniversary of Cambridge University, he premiered Peter Maxwell Davies' The Sorcerer's Mirror.

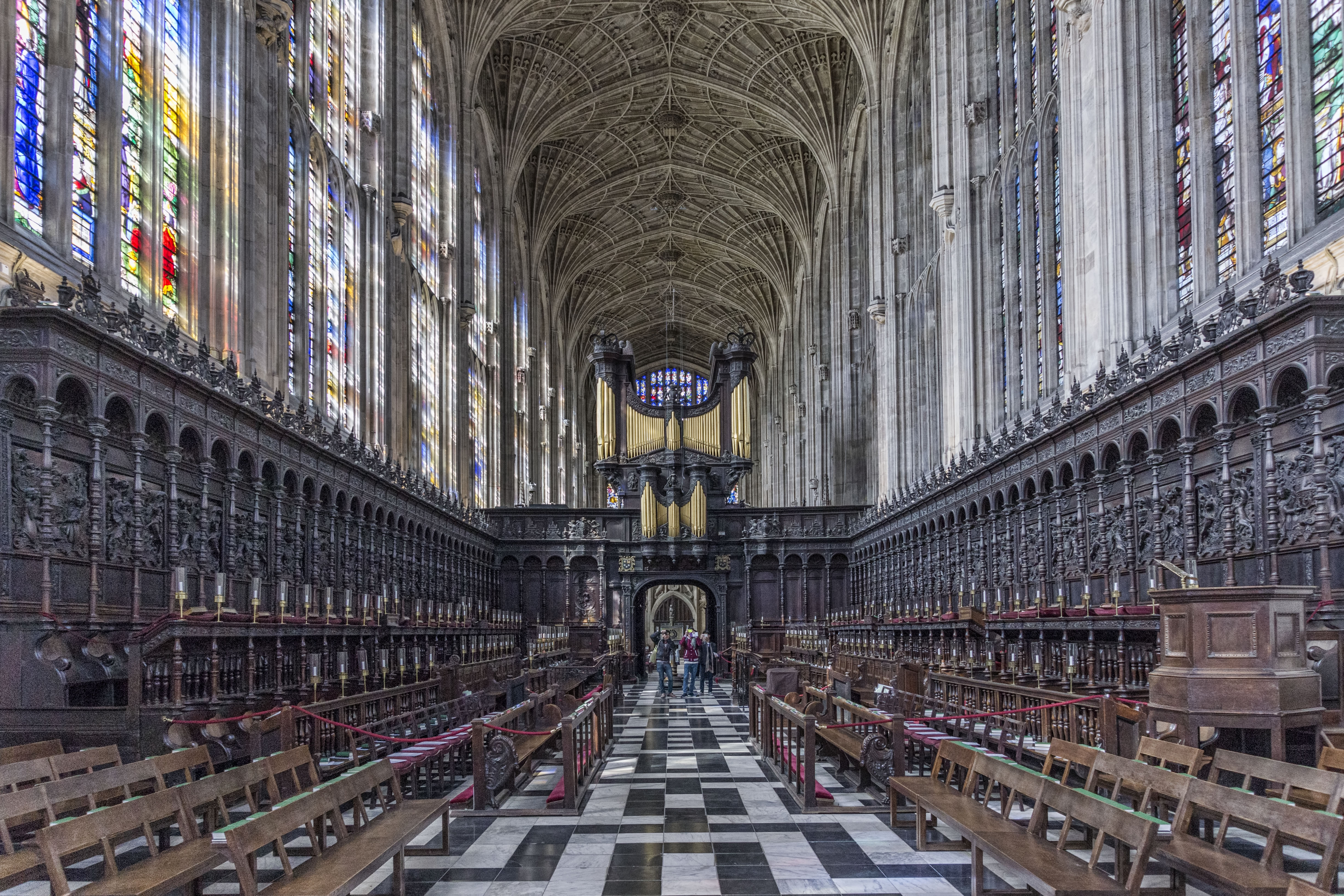
Choir stalls and Great Organ, viewed from the east end, at King's College Chapel

His last major project there was Bach's St Matthew Passion in 2019, in a sequence of performing it alternating with the St John Passion every year. The choir performed with the Academy of Ancient Music and James Gilchrist as the Evangelist. He retired on 30 September 2019, and was succeeded at King's College by Daniel Hyde.

=== Beyond Cambridge ===
Cleobury was president of the Royal College of Organists from 1990 to 1992. He was chief conductor of the BBC Singers from 1995 to 2007, and was then their conductor laureate. He performed with them themed concerts such as Shostakovich, Stalin and Soviet Russia in 2014, Creation songs in 2015, Tallis Lamentations in 2016, and for Remembrance Day 2017, Songs of Farewell. The latter was given at the King's College Chapel, and combined the world premiere of Thomas Simaku's The Scream with Hubert Parry's Songs of Farewell, and Duruflé's Notre Père and Requiem. In the concert celebrating the choir's 90th anniversary on 24 September 2014, he was one of four conductors to lead compositions written for the group. Cleobury served as a visiting fellow at the Louisiana State University School of Music for 2013–2014.

== Personal life ==
Cleobury's brother Nicholas is also a conductor and his sister is a musician and teacher. Cleobury lived with his second wife, Emma Disley, whom he married in 2004, and their two daughters. He died of cancer in his hometown of York, on 22 November 2019, the liturgical feast day of Saint Cecilia, patron saint of organ players and musicians. He also had two children from his first marriage to Penny Holloway.

== Honours and awards ==
Cleobury was awarded an Honorary Doctor of Music (D.Mus.) from Anglia Ruskin University in 2001. In 2008 he was awarded an Honorary Fellowship of the Royal School of Church Music. He was appointed Commander of the Order of the British Empire (CBE) in the 2009 Birthday Honours and was knighted in the 2019 Birthday Honours for services to choral music.

== Recordings ==
=== CD ===
==== As conductor ====
- 2020 – Bach: St Matthew Passion (released posthumously)
- 2019 – Evensong Live 2019: Anthems and Canticles
- 2019 – Howells: Cello Concerto & An English Mass
- 2019 – The Music of King's: Choral Favourites from Cambridge
- 2018 – 100 Years of Nine Lessons and Carols
- 2018 – Byrd: Motets
- 2018 – 再别康桥 (Second Farewell to Cambridge)
- 2017 – Vaughan Williams: Dona Nobis Pacem & Bernstein: Chichester Psalms
- 2017 – Bach: St John Passion
- 2016 – Evensong Live 2016
- 2016 – Hymns from King's
- 2015 – 1615 Gabrieli in Venice
- 2015 – Evensong Live 2015
- 2015 – English Hymn Anthems
- 2014 – Favourite Carols from King's
- 2014 – Fauré Requiem
- 2013 – Britten: Saint Nicolas (Choir of King's College, Cambridge)
- 2013 – Mozart: Requiem Realisations (Choir of King's College, Cambridge)
- 2012 – Nine Lessons & Carols (Choir of King's College, Cambridge)
- 2007 – I Heard a Voice – Music From the Golden Age, Works by Weelkes, Gibbons and Tomkins (Choir of King's College, Cambridge, Oliver Brett, Peter Stevens)
- 2006 – Brahms: Ein deutsches Requiem (Choir of King's College, Cambridge, with Susan Gritton, Hanno Müller-Brachmann, Evgenia Rubinova and Jose Gallardo)
- 2003 – Bach: Johannes-Passion (Choir of King's College, Cambridge, with John Mark Ainsley, Stephen Richardson, Catherine Bott, Michael Chance, Paul Agnew, and Stephen Varcoe)
- 2002 – Vivaldi: Gloria, RV 589 / Dixit Dominus, RV 594 / Magnificat, RV 610 (Choir of King's College, Cambridge, with the Academy of Ancient Music)
- 2001 – Howells: Te Deum & Jubilate (Choir of King's College Cambridge)
- 2000 – Handel: Israel in Egypt (Choir of King's College, Cambridge, Ian Bostridge, Michael Chance, Susan Gritton, Stephen Varcoe)
- 2000 – Best Loved Hymns (Choir of King's College, Cambridge)
- 1999 – Rachmaninov: Vespers (Choir of King's College, Cambridge)
- 1998 – John Rutter: Requiem (Choir of King's College, Cambridge)
- 1997 – Stanford: Evening Services in C and G (Choir of King's College, Cambridge)
- 1996 – The King's Collection (Choir of King's College, Cambridge)
- 1996 – Allegri: Miserere (Choir of King's College, Cambridge)
- 1995 – Handel: Dixit Dominus (Choir of King's College, Cambridge)
- 1994 – Ikos (Choir of King's College, Cambridge)
- 1994 – Handel: Messiah (Choir of King's College, Cambridge, with Lynne Dawson, Hilary Summers, John Mark Ainsley and Alastair Miles)
- 1994 – Bach: St Matthew Passion (Choir of King's College, Cambridge, with Rogers Covey-Crump, Michael George, Emma Kirkby, Michael Chance, Martyn Hill, David Thomas)
- 1990 – Tallis: Spem in alium, Lamentations of Jeremiah, Responsaries (Choir of King's College, Cambridge)
- 1989 – Fauré: Requiem; Duruflé: Requiem (Choir of King's College, Cambridge, Olaf Bär, Ann Murray)
- 1984 – O Come All Ye Faithful (Favourite Christmas Carols) (Choir of King's College, Cambridge)

==== As organist ====
- 2019 – Herbert Howells’ An English Mass
- 2017 – The King of Instruments: A Voice Reborn
- 2009 – The Grand Organ of King's College
- 2007 – Organ Classics from King's
- 2004 – British Organ Music from King's
- 1993 – Organ Favourites from King's College, Cambridge

=== DVD ===
As conductor:

- 2014 – Carols from King's (Choir of King's College, Cambridge)
- 2002 – Anthems from King's (Choir of King's College, Cambridge)
- 1996 – Bach: "Johannes-Passion" (Choir of King's College, Cambridge)
- 1993 – Handel: "Messiah" (Choir of King's College, Cambridge)

Preceded by Sir Philip Ledger	Director of Music, King's College, Cambridge; 1982–2019	Succeeded by Daniel Hyde
