= City of London Choir =

- Origin: London
- Genres: Classical
- Labels: Naxos, EM Records, Classic FM, RPO Records

The City of London Choir is a non-professional choir based in London, England.

In 2024, Daniel Hyde (also Director of Music for the Choir of King's College, Cambridge) was appointed as musical director and principal conductor.

With about 100 active members, it performs regularly in some of the city's principal concert venues, including the Barbican Centre, Cadogan Hall, Royal Albert Hall, Royal Festival Hall and St John's, Smith Square.

In recent years the choir has made a number of recordings and performed music of the 16th to 21st centuries with the Royal Philharmonic Orchestra, the London Mozart Players, and other ensembles.

The City of London Choir is 'a leader among non-professional choruses’ in the words of The Times.

https://www.cityoflondonchoir.org/meet-us

== History ==
The City of London Choir started life as the Kingsway Choral Society, founded by Donald Cashmore. In 1963, it was renamed the City of London Choir and its inaugural concert under that name took place at the Church of the Holy Sepulchre in Holborn. The choir's early patrons included Benjamin Britten, Sir George Dyson, Ursula Vaughan Williams and Kenneth Leighton. Donald Cashmore, the founding conductor, was succeeded by Hilary Davan Wetton in 1989, who led the choir until 2023. Under his musical direction, the choir developed a particularly strong reputation for English music of the twentieth century, but it has a broad repertoire.

The choir is a registered charity whose object is to nurture a love and understanding of music among its members and audiences, and is committed to creating opportunities for children and young people both to perform and to attend concerts, notably through its Young Singer Scheme, the Front Row Club, and the Young Apprentice Tenor Scheme which aims to foster and encourage new young choral tenors from London schools with bursaries. For more details on all these initiatives, please see the choir's website. Besides concerts and recordings, the choir organises choral workshops and residential weekends which are open to members and non-members alike.

== Recordings ==
https://www.cityoflondonchoir.org/recordings

- John Gardner: The Ballad of the White Horse (2020)
- Michael Stimpson: The Angry Garden (2019)
- The Nation's Favourite Carols, Classic FM, 2017
- Nelson Mass and Mass in Time of War (Haydn), RPO Records, 2016
- Flowers of the Field (Vaughan Williams, Fizni, Gurney, Butterworth), Naxos, 2014
- Cantata for Christmas (John Gardner), EM Records, 2012
- Der Glorreiche Augenblick (Beethoven). Naxos, 2012
- The Coming of Christ (Holst). EM Records, 2011
- In Terra Pax: A Christmas Anthology. Naxos, 2009
