= Daniel Hyde =

Daniel Hyde may refer to:

- Daniel Hyde (actor) (born 1975), British actor
- Daniel Hyde (organist), director of music for the choir of King's College, Cambridge
- Danny Hyde, English musician, producer and engineer
