= Ashley Grote =

British organist and Master of Music at Norwich Cathedral (born 1982)

Ashley Grote (born 1982) is Master of music at Norwich Cathedral and a fellow of the Royal College of Organists.

Born in 1982, Grote grew up in Colchester and attended Eld Lane Baptist Church with his family, where he sang in the choir and first played the organ. He joined the Choir of King's College, Cambridge at the age of eight in response to a newspaper advertisement for voice trials. He then attended Uppingham School and returned to King's in October 2001 as an organ scholar. He won first prize in the 1999 Royal College of Organists' Young Performers' Festival. In 2000 he was the first organist ever to win a place in the keyboard final of the BBC Young Musician of the Year Competition.

Prior to appointment as Master of Music at Norwich Cathedral in 2012, Grote was Assistant Organist at Westminster Abbey, and Assistant Director of Music at Gloucester Cathedral.

He has regularly competed in the London Marathon to raise funds for Great Ormond Street Hospital, following his daughter's diagnosis with a brain tumour in 2014.

In 2018, Grote competed on MasterChef UK. He was eliminated in the first heat.
