= Nine Lessons and Carols =

Traditional Christmas service of Christian worship

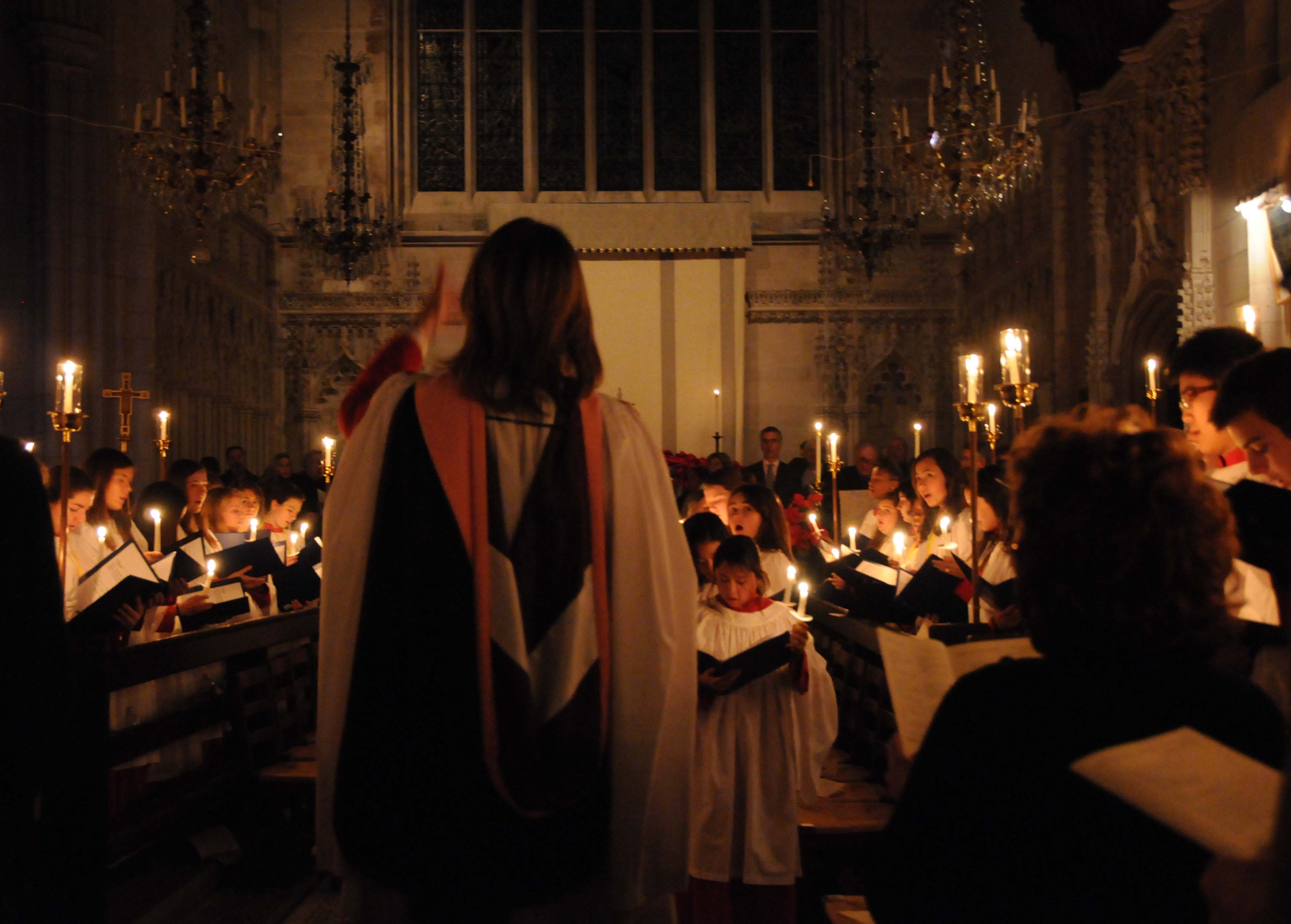
- A service of Nine Lessons in 2010 at St. George's School, Middletown, Rhode Island, U.S.
- Genre: Religious service/Anglican church music
- Frequency: Annually during Advent
- Venue: Anglican and other Christian churches worldwide, notably King's College Chapel, Cambridge
- Inaugurated: 24 December 1880
- Founder: Edward White Benson

Nine Lessons and Carols, also known as the Festival of Nine Lessons and Carols and Service of Nine Lessons and Carols, is a service of Christian worship traditionally celebrated on or near Christmas Eve in Anglican churches and globally within the Anglican Communion. The story of the fall of humanity, the promise of the Messiah, and the birth of Jesus is told in nine short Bible readings or lessons from Genesis, the prophetic books and the Gospels, interspersed with the singing of Christmas carols, hymns and choir anthems.

== History ==
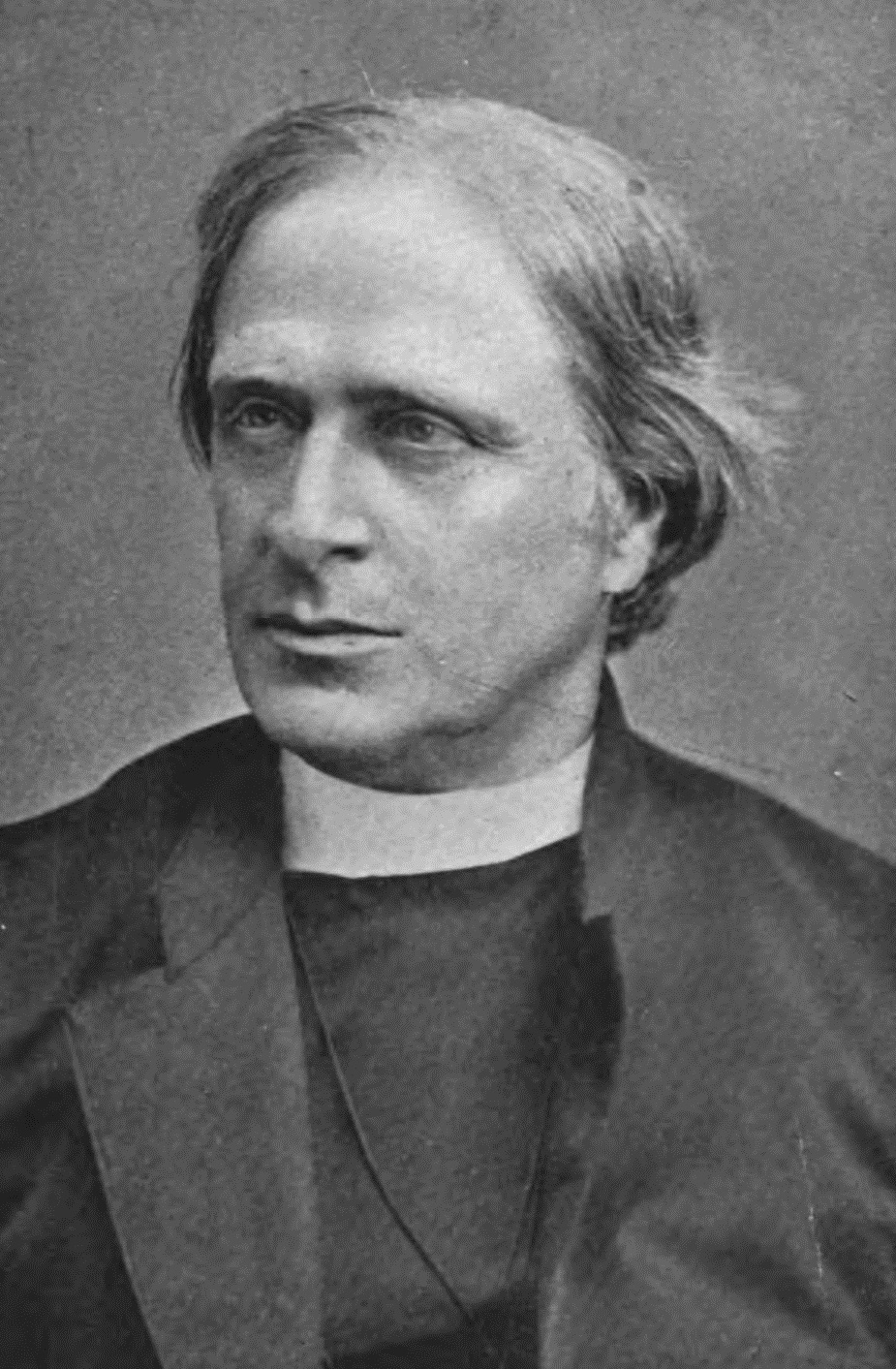
Edward White Benson, credited with devising the service of Nine Lessons and Carols in 1880

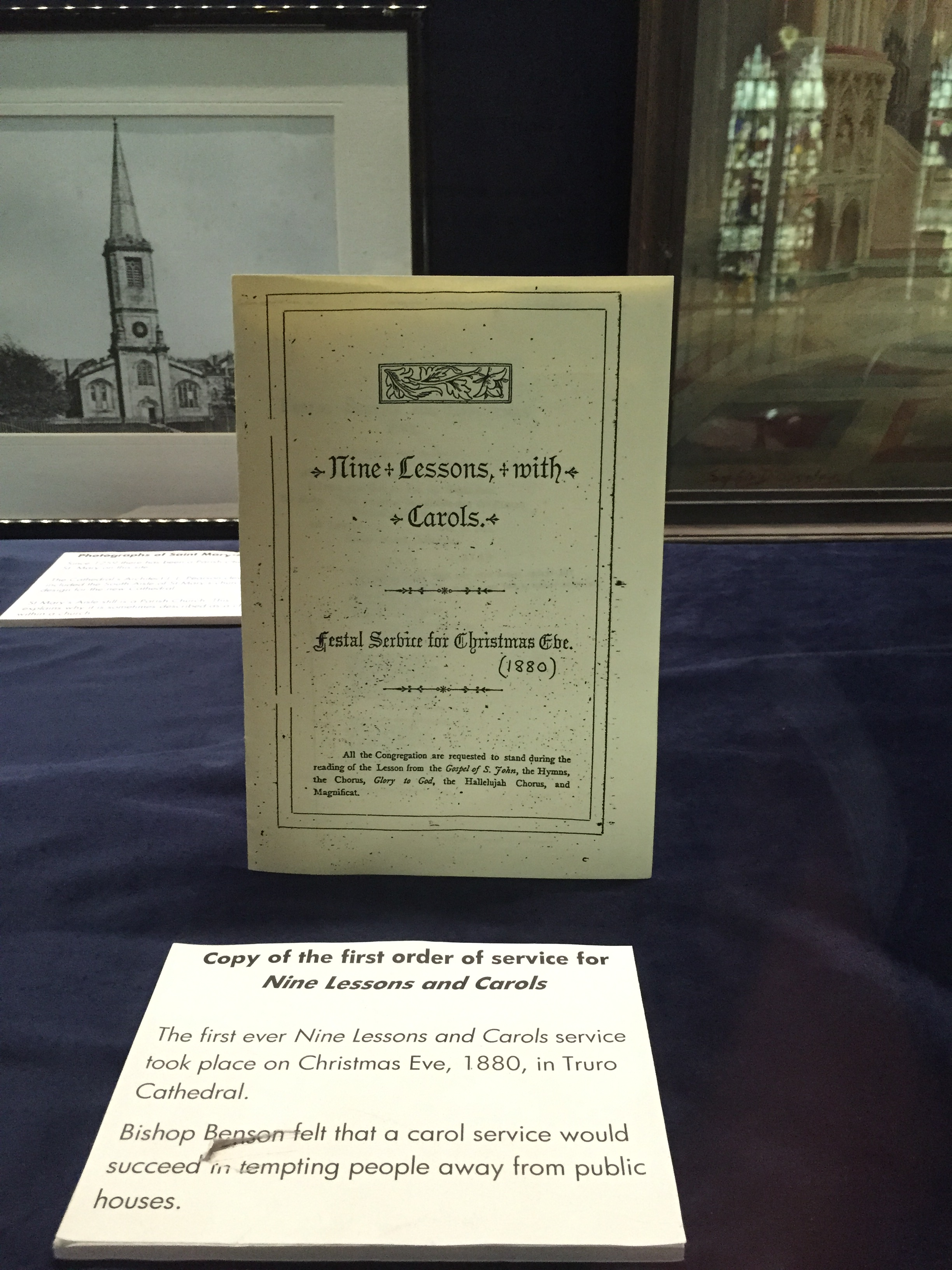
Order of Service for the first Nine Lessons and Carols in 1880 on display in Truro Cathedral

Although the tradition of Nine Lessons and Carols is popularly associated with King's College, Cambridge, its origins are attributed to Truro Cathedral in Cornwall. Up to the late 19th century, the singing of Christmas carols was normally performed by singers visiting people's houses, and carols – generally considered to be secular in content – had been excluded from Christian worship. In the Victorian era, the rising popularity of hymnody encouraged church musicians to introduce carols into worship. An 1875 book of carols, Carols for Use in Church During Christmas and Epiphany by Richard Chope and Sabine Baring-Gould, was an influential publication. At around this time, the composer and organist John Stainer was compiling a collection, Christmas Carols New and Old, and during Christmas 1878 he introduced carols into the service of Choral Evensong at St Paul's Cathedral in London. Other cathedrals also began to adopt carols at Christmastide that year and the Royal Cornwall Gazette reported that the choir of Truro Cathedral would sing a service of carols at 10:00 pm on Christmas Eve:

The Choir of the Cathedral will sing a number of carols in the Cathedral on Christmas Eve, the service commencing at 10pm. We understand that this is at the wish of many of the leading parishioners and others. A like service has been instituted in other cathedral and large towns, and has been much appreciated. It is the intention of the choir to no longer continue the custom of singing carols at the residences of members of the congregation.

— Royal Cornwall Gazette, 20 December 1878

Two years later, the Right Rev. Edward White Benson, at that time Bishop of Truro, conducted the first formal service of "Nine Lessons and Carols" on Christmas Eve (24 December) 1880. Benson, concerned at the excessive consumption of alcohol in Cornish pubs during the festive season, sought a means of attracting revellers out of the pubs and into church by offering a religious celebration of Christmas. The idea for a service consisting of Christmas music interspersed with Bible readings was proposed by the succentor of the cathedral, the Rev. George Walpole (who later became Bishop of Edinburgh). The cathedral – a Victorian Gothic building – was still under construction, and services were being held in a temporary wooden structure which served as a pro-cathedral. The first Nine Lessons and Carols service took place there at 10:00 p.m. on Christmas Eve and was attended by over 400 people.

Benson's son, A. C. Benson, later recalled:

My father arranged from ancient sources a little services for Christmas Eve, nine carols and nine tiny lessons. They were read by various officers of the church, beginning with a chorister and ending, through different grades, with the bishop.

— A. C. Benson,

Bishop Benson was appointed Archbishop of Canterbury in 1883, and the Nine Lessons service began to gain in popularity across the Church of England and the wider Anglican Communion, as well as Roman Catholic churches in England and Wales. The original liturgy has since been adapted and used by other churches all over the world, particularly in English-speaking countries. Lessons and Carols most often occur in Anglican churches. However, numerous Christian denominations have adopted the service, or a variation of it, as part of their Christmas celebrations. In the UK, the service has become the standard format for school carol services.

=== Global spread ===
On Christmas Eve 1914, David Wilson organised the first service of Nine Lessons and Carols in Ireland in North Strand Church in Dublin. A special carol service was held in 2014 to celebrate the centenary.

In 1916, a service of Nine Lessons and Carols was held at Brown University in Providence, Rhode Island; the institution celebrated the 100th anniversary of its Lessons and Carols in 2016.

Notably in 1918, the Rev. Eric Milner-White the new dean of King's College, Cambridge, introduced the service to the college chapel, taking advantage of the established choral tradition of the Choir of King's College, Cambridge. It proved highly successful, and began an annual tradition – albeit with some alterations to Benson's original format from 1919 onwards. The BBC began to broadcast the service from King's College on the radio from 1928 and on television from 1954, establishing it as the most popular and widely recognised presentation of the service.

In North America, the Lessons and Carols tradition spread to other US and Canadian institutions. In 1928, organist and choirmaster Twining Lynes, introduced the service to Groton School in Groton, Massachusetts, after being inspired by services in England.

In December 2013, Truro Cathedral staged a reconstruction of Bishop Benson's original 1880 Nine Lessons with Carols Service which was attended by a congregation of over 1,500 people.

== Service at King's College, Cambridge ==
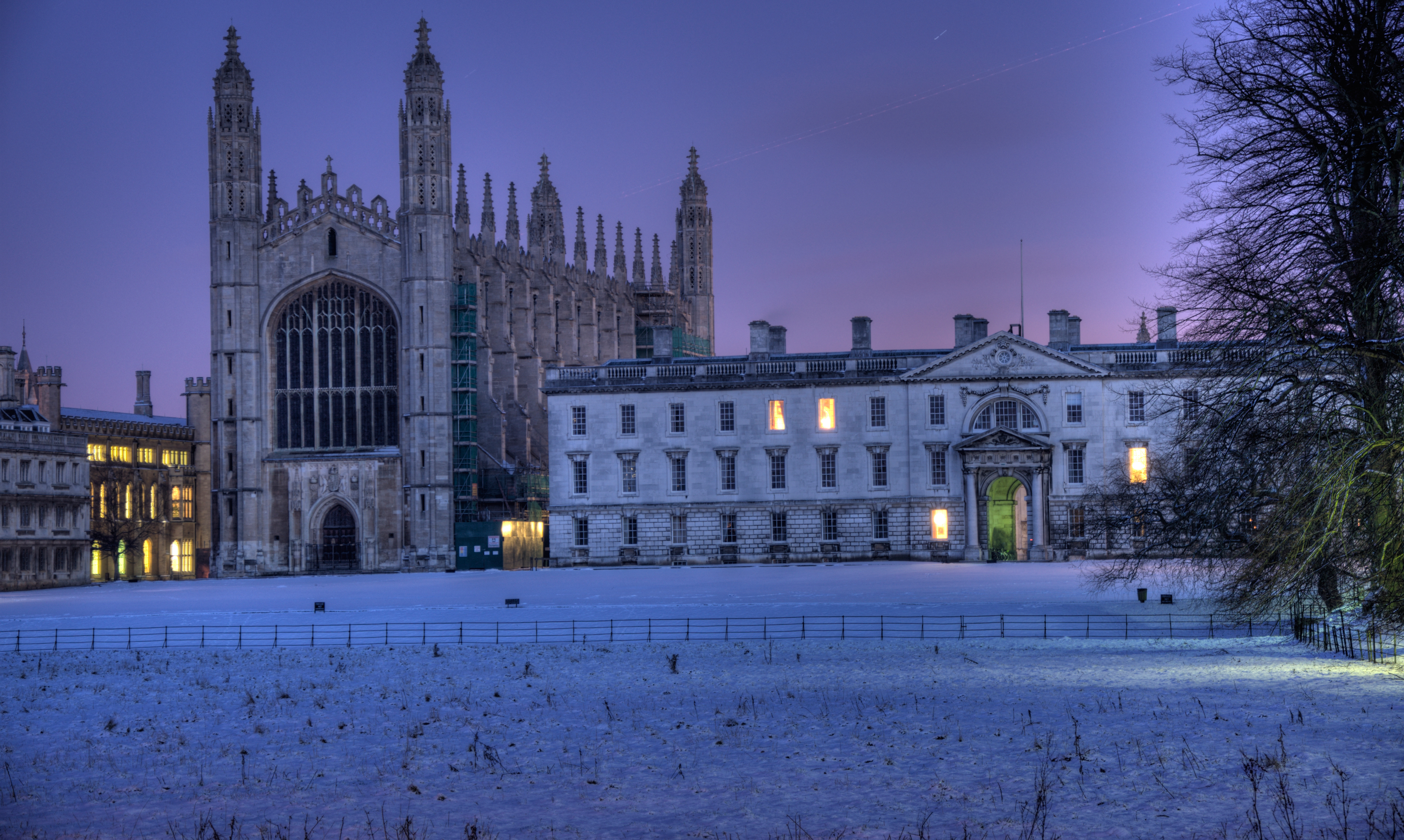
King's College Chapel, Cambridge (left), from where the popular Nine Lessons and Carols service is broadcast annually on Christmas Eve

The first Festival of Nine Lessons and Carols at King's College Chapel, Cambridge, was held on Christmas Eve in 1918, directed by Arthur Henry Mann who was the organist from 1876 to 1929. During World War I the dean, Eric Milner-White, had served as army chaplain in the 7th Infantry Division and he was concerned that the distress of the "Great War" had hardened attitudes against religion. Taking advantage of the established choral tradition of the Choir of King's College, Cambridge, he introduced Benson's carol service to King's as a means of attracting people back to Christian worship.

The King's College service was immensely successful, and the following year Milner-White made some changes to Benson's original format, notably introducing the tradition of opening the service with a solo treble singing "Once in Royal David's City". This was then followed by a bidding prayer penned by Milner-White himself, and re-ordering the lessons. The choir had 16 trebles as specified in statutes laid down by Henry VI, and until 1927 the men's voices were provided by choral scholars and lay clerks. Today, 14 undergraduates from the choir sing the men's parts.

=== Broadcasting of the service ===
The popularity of the service was established when the service began to be broadcast by the British Broadcasting Corporation in 1928, and, except for 1930, has been broadcast every year since. During the 1930s the service reached a worldwide audience when the BBC began broadcasting the service on its Overseas Service. Even throughout the Second World War, despite the stained glass having been removed from the chapel and the lack of heating, the broadcasts continued. For security reasons, the name "King's" was not mentioned during wartime broadcasts.

Nine Lessons and Carols from King's College was first televised by BBC Television in 1954, conducted by the director of music, Boris Ord.

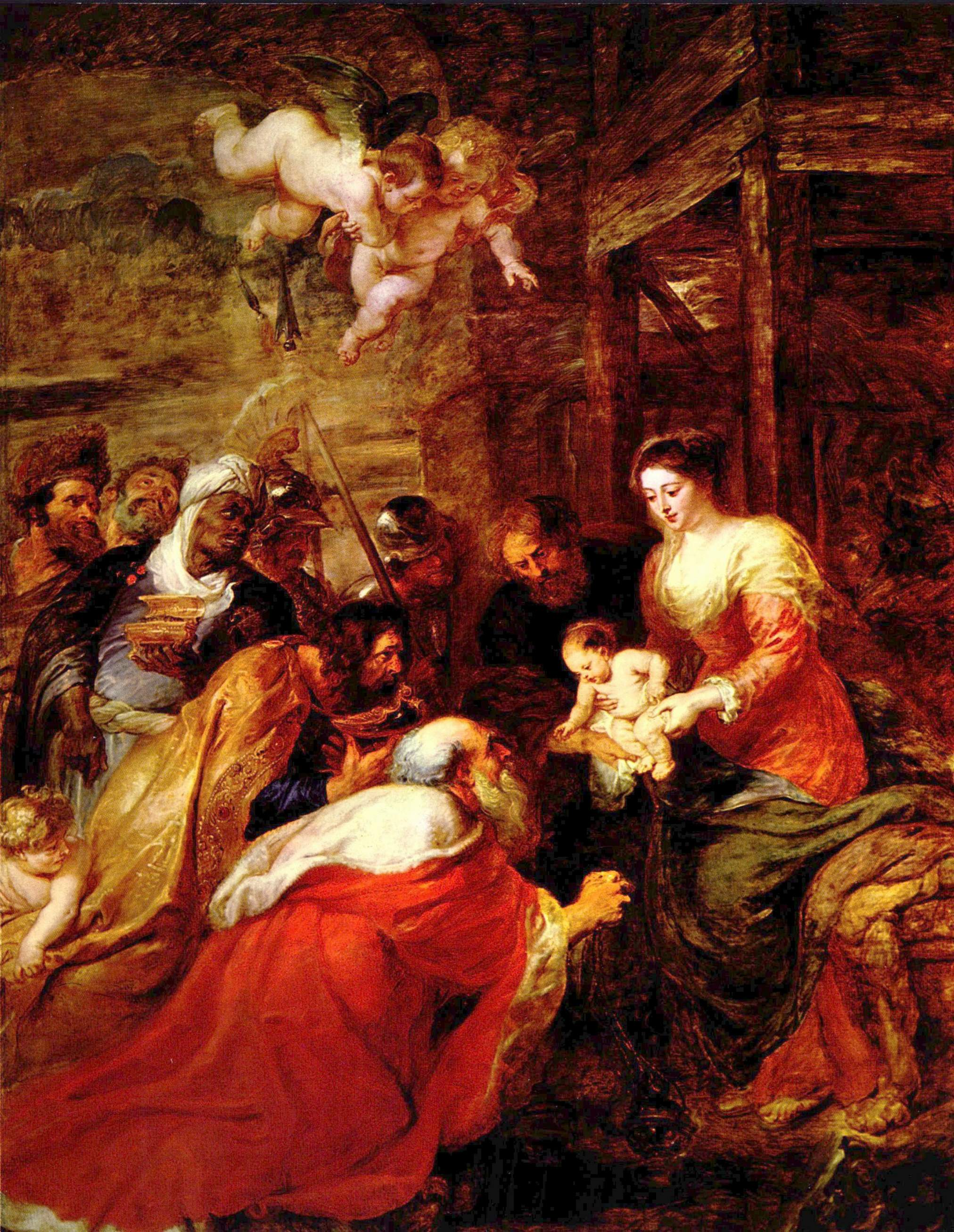
The Adoration of the Magi (1634) by Peter Paul Rubens, which hangs behind the altar in King's College Chapel, Cambridge

Since the Second World War, it has been estimated that each year there are millions of listeners worldwide who listen to the service live on the BBC World Service. Domestically, the service is broadcast live on BBC Radio 4, and a recorded broadcast is made on Christmas Day on BBC Radio 3. In the US, a 1954 service was put into the National Recording Registry by the Library of Congress in 2008. The broadcast has been heard live on public radio stations affiliated with American Public Media since 1979, and most stations broadcast a repeat on Christmas Day. Since 1963, the service has been periodically filmed for television broadcast in the UK.

A programme entitled Carols from King's is pre-recorded in early or mid-December then shown on Christmas Eve in the UK on BBC Two. This is a different service from the Festival of Nine Lessons and Carols. The programme is weighted more heavily in favour of carols sung by the choir, with only seven readings in total, not all of which are from the Bible.

In 2020, during the COVID-19 pandemic, the Festival of Nine Lessons and Carols was conducted, for the first time, without a congregation. The service did not take place live, but instead a pre-recorded service produced by King's College was broadcast at the usual time. It was the first time since 1930 that the service had not been broadcast live.

=== Order of service ===
The format of the Festival of Nine Lessons and Carols has not changed substantially since 1918. The order of the lessons was revised in 1919, since when the service has always begun with the hymn "Once in Royal David's City". Today the first verse is sung unaccompanied by a solo boy chorister. To avoid putting him under undue stress, the chorister is not told that he will be singing the solo until immediately before the service.

The nine lessons, which are the same every year, are read by representatives of the College and of the city of Cambridge using the text of the King James Version of the Bible published in 1611. The singing is made up of "carols" sung by the choir and "hymns" sung by the choir and congregation. Some services have also included anthems sung between the carols and hymns, such as a performance of "E'en So, Lord Jesus, Quickly Come" in 2004. Since 1983, a new carol has been commissioned by the College and premiered at the service. The carols vary from year to year, although some music is repeated, and the service ends with the hymn "Hark! The Herald Angels Sing". The order of service in 2025 is as follows:

- Organ preludes

- "Fantasia in G, BWV, 572" – music by Johann Sebastian Bach (1685-1750)
- 'Les bergers' from "La Nativité du Seigneur" – music by Olivier Messiaen (1908-1992)
- "Wie schön leuchtet der Morgenstern, BuxWV 223" – music by Dietrich Buxtehude (c. 1637-1707)
- 'Offertoire sur Deux Noëls' from "Pièces dans différents styles, Op. 19" – music by Alexandre Guilmant (1837-1911)
- 'La Nativité' from "Poèmes Évangeliques, Op. 7" – music by Jean Langlais (1907-1991)
- 'Noël, Grand Jeu et duo' from "Livre de Noëls, Op. 2" – music by Louis-Claude Daquin (1694-1772)
- 'Resonet in Laudibus' from "Cathedral Windows, Op. 106" – music by Sigfrid Karg-Elert (1877-1933)
- 'The Holy Boy' from "Preludes" – music by John Ireland (1879-1962)
- "Chorale Prelude on 'Lob sei Gott'" – music by Jeremy Thurlow
- 'Desseins éternals' from "La Nativité du Seigneur" – music by Olivier Messiaen
- "In dulci jubilo, BuxWV 197" – music by Dietrich Buxtehude

- Processional hymn: "Once in Royal David's City" – words by Cecil Frances Alexander (1818−1895); melody ('Irby') by Henry Gauntlett (1805−1876); harmonised by Arthur Henry Mann (1850−1929); descant by David Willcocks (1919-2015)

- Bidding prayer, concluding with the Lord's Prayer

- Carol: "The blessed son of God only" – words by Miles Coverdale (c.1488-1569) after Martin Luther (1483-1546); music by Ralph Vaughan Williams (1872-1958)

- First lesson from Genesis 3: 8–15, 17–19 (read by a chorister of King's College)

- Carol: "Adam lay ybounden" – words, 15th century English, modernised by Edith Rickert (1871-1938); music by Boris Ord (1897-1961)

- Second lesson from Genesis 22: 15–18 (read by a student of King's College)

- Carol: "Nowell sing we now all and some" – words, anonymous 15th century English; translated by Rosanna Omitowuju; music by Elizabeth Maconchy (1907-1994)

- Third lesson from Isaiah 9: 2, 6–7 (read by a member of the King's College staff)

- Carol: "Sussex Carol" – words and music, English traditional; arranged by Philip Ledger (1937-2012)
- Hymn: "It Came Upon the Midnight Clear" – words by Edmund Hamilton Sears (1810-1876); melody ('Noel') adapted by Arthur Sullivan (1842-1900); descant by John Scott (1956-2015)

- Fourth lesson from Isaiah 11: 1–4a, 6–9 (read by a representative of Eton College)

- Carol: "The Darkling Thrush" – words by Thomas Hardy (1840-1928); music by Rachel Portman (commissioned for the 2025 service)
- Carol: "The Lamb" – words by William Blake (1757-1827); music by John Tavener (1944-2013)

- Fifth lesson from Luke 1: 26–35, 38 (read by a Fellow of King's College)

- Carol: "Ave Maria" – words from Luke 1:28, 42; music by Anton Bruckner (1824-96)
- Carol: "There is no rose of such virtue" – words and music, anonymous 15th century; arranged by John Stevens (1921-2002)

- Sixth lesson from Luke 2: 1–7 (read by the Deputy Mayor of Cambridge)

- Carol: "A Boy Was Born" – words, 16th century German; translated by Percy Dearmer (1867-1936); music by Benjamin Britten (1913-76)
- Hymn: "Unto Us is Born a Son" – words, anonymous 14th century; melody ('Puer nobis') from Piae Cantiones; arranged by David Willcocks

- Seventh lesson from Luke 2: 8–16 (read by the Director of Music of King's College)

- Carol: "Nativity Carol" – words and music by John Rutter
- Carol: "The Shepherds' Farewell" – words by Paul England (1863-1932); music from L'Enfance du Christ, Op. 25 by Hector Berlioz (1803-69)

- Eighth lesson from Matthew 2: 1–12 (read by the Vice-Provost of King's College)

- Carol: "Dormi Jesu" – words in Latin, origin unknown; translated by Samuel Coleridge-Taylor (1875-1912); music by John Rutter
- Carol: "I Saw Three Ships" – words and music, traditional English; arranged by Stuart Nicholson

- Ninth lesson from John 1: 1–14 (read by the Provost of King's College)

- Hymn: "O Come, All Ye Faithful" – words, translated by Frederick Oakeley (1802−1880), William Thomas Brooke (1848−1917), et al.; melody ('Adeste, fideles') by John Francis Wade (1711−1786); arranged by David Willcocks; descant by Daniel Hyde

- Collect and blessing

- Hymn: "Hark! The Herald Angels Sing" – words by Charles Wesley (1707−1788), et al.; adapted by William Hayman Cummings (1831-1915); melody ('Mendelssohn') by Felix Mendelssohn-Bartholdy (1809−1847); descant by David Willcocks

- Organ voluntaries

- "In Dulci Jubilo, BWV 729" – music by Johann Sebastian Bach
- 'Dieu parmi nous' from "La Nativité du Seigneur" – music by Olivier Messiaen

=== Commissioned carols and organ postludes ===
The table below shows the new carols commissioned by King's College, Cambridge, since 1983.

Year	Title of carol	Author/source and composer
1983	In Wintertime (When Thou Wast Born in Wintertime)	Words: Betty Askwith; Music: Lennox Berkeley
1984	One Star, At Last (Fix on One Star)	Words: George Mackay Brown; Music: Peter Maxwell Davies
1985	Illuminare Jerusalem	Words: Adapted from the Bannatyne Manuscript; Music: Judith Weir
1986	Nowel, Nowel, Holly Dark	Words: Walter de la Mare; Music: Richard Rodney Bennett
1987	What Sweeter Music Can We Bring	Words: Robert Herrick; Music: John Rutter
1988	The Birthday of Thy King (Awake, Glad Heart, Get up, and Sing!)	Words: After Henry Vaughan; Music: Peter Sculthorpe
1989	Carol of St. Steven	Words: Adapted from William Sandys; Music: Alexander Goehr
1990	Богородице Дево, радуйся (Rejoice, O Virgin Mary)	Words: Eastern Orthodox liturgy (in Russian); Music: Arvo Pärt
1991	A Gathering	Words: Lancelot Andrewes; Music: John Casken
1992	Swetë Jesu	Words: Anonymous, 13th century Music: Nicholas Maw
1993	Christo Paremus Cantica	Words: Anonymous, 15th century Music: Diana Burrell
1994	The Angels (Should you Hear them Singing Among Stars)	Words: John V. Taylor; Music: Jonathan Harvey
1995	Seinte Marie Moder Milde	Words: 13th century manuscript in the library of Trinity College, Cambridge; Music: James MacMillan
1996	Pilgrim Jesus (Iesus! Christus! In the Manger of my Body)	Words: Kevin Crossley-Holland; Music: Stephen Paulus
1997	The Fayrfax Carol	Words: Anonymous, early Tudor; Music: Thomas Adès
1998	Winter Solstice Carol	Words: English translation of the Magnificat antiphon for Christmas Day; Music: Giles Swayne
1999	On Christmas Day to My Heart	Words: Clement Paman; Music: Richard Rodney Bennett
2000	The Three Kings	Words:Dorothy L. Sayers; Music: Jonathan Dove
2001	Spring in Winter	Words: Christopher Smart; Music: John Woolrich
2002	The Angel Gabriel Descended to a Virgin	Words: 15th–17th century Music: Robin Holloway
2003	The Gleam (Not yet shepherds the gilded kings)	Words: Stephen Plaice; Music: Harrison Birtwistle
2004	God Would be Born in Thee (Lo, In the Silent Night a Child in God is Born)	Words: Angelus Silesius; Music: Judith Bingham
2005	Away in a Manger	Words: 19th century Music: John Tavener
2006	Misere' Nobis (Jesu of a Maiden Thou Wast Born)	Words: English mediaeval carol Music: Mark-Anthony Turnage
2007	Noël (Now Comes the Dawn) (Stardust and Vaporous Light)	Words: Richard Watson Gilder; Music: Brett Dean
2008	Mary (The Night When She First Gave Birth)	Words: Bertolt Brecht, translated by Michael Hamburger; Music: Dominic Muldowney
2009	The Christ Child	Words: G. K. Chesterton; Music: Gabriel Jackson
2010	Christmas Carol (Offerings They Brought of Gold)	Words: Einojuhani Rautavaara, translated by Hanni-Mari and Christopher Latham; Music: Einojuhani Rautavaara
2011	Christmas Hath a Darkness	Words: Christina Rossetti; Music: Tansy Davies
2012	Ring Out, Wild Bells	Words: Alfred, Lord Tennyson; Music: Carl Vine
2013	Hear the Voice of the Bard	Words: William Blake; Music: Thea Musgrave
2014	De Virgine Maria	Words: 12th-century Latin, translated by Ronald Knox; Music: Carl Rütti
2015	The Flight	Words: George Szirtes; Music: Richard Causton
2016	This Endernight	Words: Anonymous c. 1400; Music: Michael Berkeley
2017	Carol Eliseus	Words: Welsh; Music: Huw Watkins
2018	O Mercy Divine	Words: Charles Wesley; Music: Judith Weir
2019	The Angel Gabriel	Words: Basque, translated by Sabine Baring-Gould; Music: Philip Moore
2020	No new commission	
2021	There is no Rose	Words: 15th century Music: Cecilia McDowall
2022	Angelus ad Virginem	Words: Mediaeval; Music: Matthew Martin
2023	The Cradle	Words: Anonymous, 17th century Austrian, translated by Robert Graves; Music: Cheryl Frances-Hoad
2024	Three Points of Light	Words: Peter Cairns; Music: Grayston Ives
2025	The Darkling Thrush	Words: Thomas Hardy; Music: Rachel Portman

Organ postludes have also been commissioned in certain years, as shown in the table below.

Year	Title of postlude	Composer
2005	Improvisation on "Adeste Fideles"	Francis Pott
2006	Recessional on "In the Bleak Midwinter"	Lionel Steuart Fothringham
2007	Sortie on "In Dulci Jubilo"	David Briggs

=== Attendance at the service ===
Attendance at the Festival of Nine Lessons and Carols held on Christmas Eve at King's College is now by ticket only, many of which are allocated by public ballot; standby tickets are also made available to those who applied in the ballot. Owing to the service's popularity, demand for seats greatly exceeds the number of tickets available. In previous years, when tickets were available at the door, some people began queuing the night before, but now only those with standby tickets are permitted to stand in the queue.

== See also ==
- Anglican church music
- List of carols at the Nine Lessons and Carols, King's College Chapel
- 100 Years of Nine Lessons and Carols
