= John Angel (chaplain) =

John Angel (d 1568), was an English priest. He sang as a lay clerk in the Choir of King's College, Cambridge after which he was appointed a Gentleman of the Chapel Royal and was present at the funeral of Edward VI, the coronation and funeral of Mary I and the coronation of Elizabeth I.

By 1561 he was appointed sub-Dean of the Chapel Royal, which he held unto his death on 17 August 1568, after which he was buried in St Mary le Strand.

He published a work on the Real Presence under the title The agreement of the holye fathers and doctours of the churche upon the chiefest articles of the Christain religion, 1555.
