= Boris Ord =

British musician

Boris Ord CBE
- 1957 portrait photograph of Boris Ord by Antony Barrington Brown
- Born: Bernhard Ord; 9 July 1897; Clifton, Bristol
- Died: 30 December 1961 (aged 64); Cambridge
- Occupations: Choirmaster, organist, composer
- Era: 20th-century
- Parent(s): Clement Ord and Johanna Anthes

Boris Ord (born Bernhard Ord), CBE (9 July 1897 – 30 December 1961) was a British organist and choirmaster of King's College, Cambridge (1929-1957). During World War II he served in the Royal Air Force. He is best known for his choral setting of Adam lay ybounden, his only published composition.

== Early life and education ==
Bernhard Ord was born at Clifton, Bristol, the youngest son of Clement Ord, a lecturer at the University of Bristol, and Johanna Anthes. Having a German mother, Ord's given name was Bernhard, but he was later universally known by his nickname, Boris.

Ord was educated at Clifton College, Bristol – as was his successor, Sir David Willcocks – and Corpus Christi College, Cambridge, where he was the John Stewart of Rannoch scholar in Sacred Music.

Ord graduated from Clifton in 1914 aged 17, and he went to study at the Royal College of Music on an organ scholarship as a pupil of Walter Parratt. His studies were interrupted by the outbreak of World War I and Ord went to serve as a pilot in the Royal Flying Corps. After the war, he returned to the Royal College to continue his musical studies. In 1920, Ord won an organ scholarship at Corpus Christi College, Cambridge. During his time there, he was very active in the musical life of the university and founded the Cambridge University Madrigal Society, in recognition of which he was awarded a Cambridge Fellowship in 1923.

== Career ==
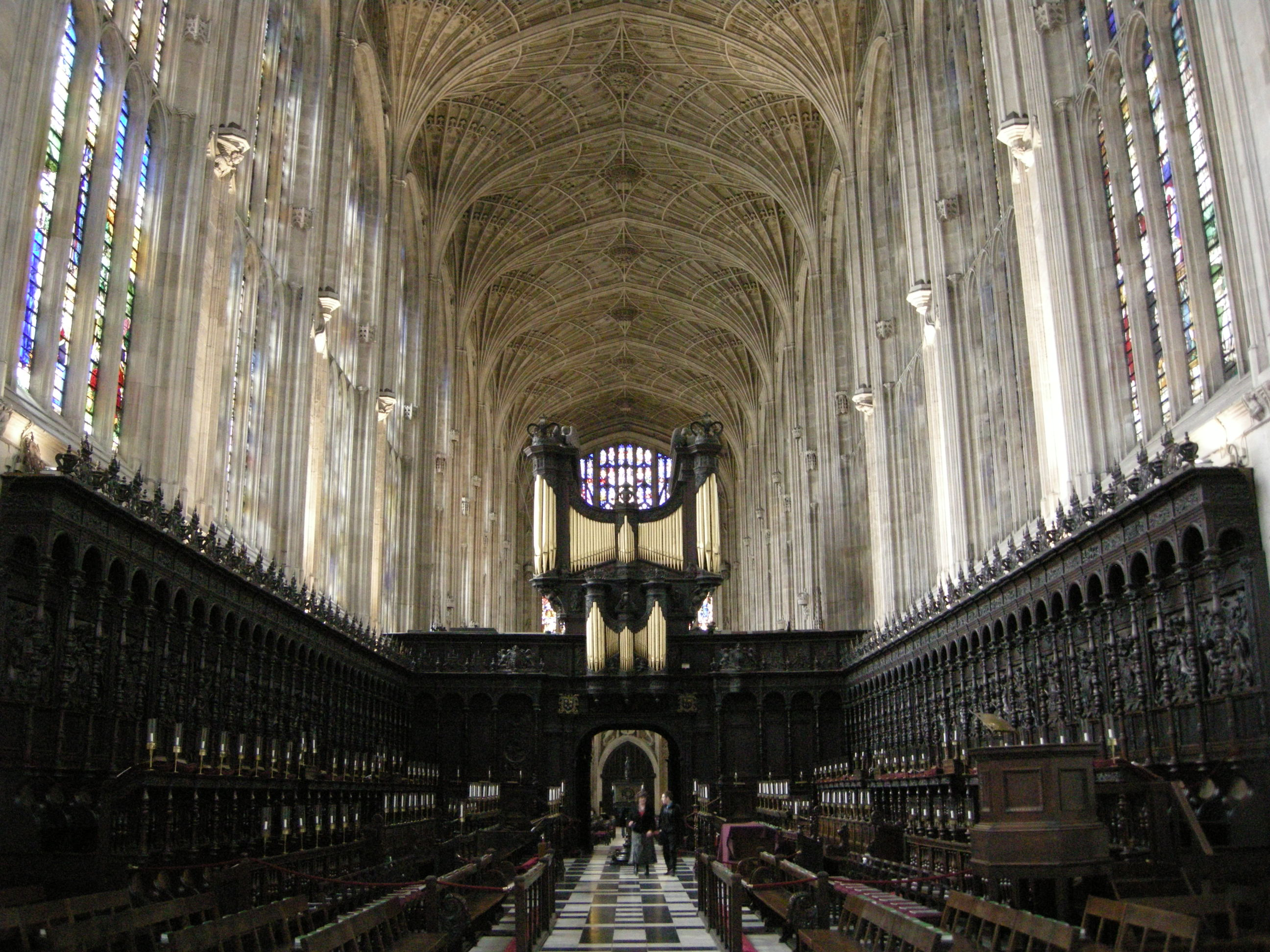
The interior of King's College Chapel, Cambridge (pictured February 2011), where Ord was organist from 1929 to 1957

Ord spent a year working at the Cologne Opera in 1928, before returning to Cambridge as a conductor. In 1936, Ord became director of the Cambridge University Musical Society.

In 1929, Boris Ord took the position of organist of King's College, Cambridge, a role which placed him in charge of the chapel choir. He was assisted by an organ scholar, a role held from 1939 by David Willcocks.

During his tenure at King's, Ord began to introduce more 16th-century music into the choral repertoire, replacing much of the Victorian music favoured by his predecessor, Arthur Henry Mann. Ord became well acquainted with the dean of the college, Rev Eric Milner-White, who originally devised the service of Nine Lessons and Carols in 1918. When the Nine Lessons was first televised in 1954 by BBC Television, the choir was conducted by Ord.

After the outbreak of World War II, both Ord and Willcocks left King's to join the armed forces. Ord served in an administrative role in the Royal Air Force, now being considered too old to fly. The composer Harold Darke deputised for Ord during that period.

In August and September 1948, Ord conducted the University Madrigal Society in the ruins of Berlin, as part of a Foreign Office soft-power tour in support of the Berlin Airlift.

In the mid 1950s, Ord began to suffer from disseminated sclerosis, and it was decided to split Ord's role into two new positions. Ord took on the new title of "director of music", while Willcocks was appointed to the role of organist. Ord retired in 1957, and Willcocks took over his role under the title "organist and director of music", a title which has since been held by all his successors.

== Personal life ==
Ord was widely known within the music profession to be homosexual, and he never married.

== Death ==
Ord died on 30 December 1961, aged 64, and was cremated on 5 January 1962 at Cambridge Crematorium. His ashes were interred in King's College Chapel.

== Composition ==
Ord is known for his only published piece of music, a choral setting of a medieval text, Adam lay ybounden, written in 1957. Ord's carol is frequently performed at the popular annual service Festival of Nine Lessons and Carols at King's, sometimes alternating with the other settings by Peter Warlock and Philip Ledger.

Cultural offices
Preceded by Arthur Henry Mann	Director of Music, King's College, Cambridge; 1929–1957	Succeeded by Sir David Willcocks
