= Arthur Henry Mann =

English organist and composer

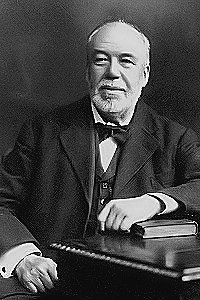
Arthur Henry Mann

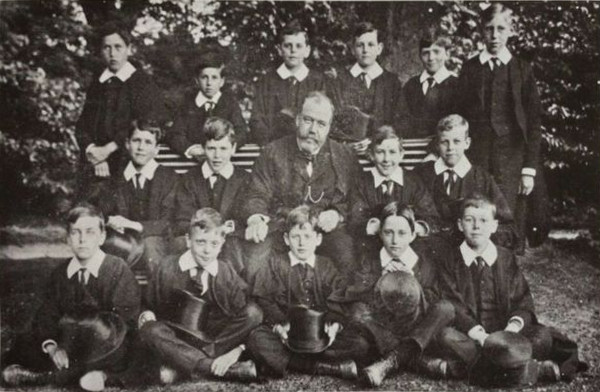
Dr A.H. Mann with his choir, c. 1914

Dr. Arthur Henry Mann (16 May 1850 – 19 November 1929), known affectionately as "Daddy Mann", was an English organist, choirmaster, teacher, and composer who served as Director of Music at King's College Chapel, Cambridge, for more than 50 years.

== Family and education ==
Born to Henry James Mann (1809–1860) and Ann Couzens Jubey (1811–1891) in Norwich, Norfolk, Mann was a chorister at Norwich Cathedral, where he studied as an articled pupil to the cathedral organist and renowned voice trainer Zechariah Buck.

In January 1864, at the age of 13, he appeared with the Bury St. Edmunds Athaenaem Choral Society in its production of Handel's Judas Maccabaeus, the Norfolk Chronicle noting the "strength in the voice of the young chorister from Norwich Cathedral (Master A. Mann), whose delightful and judicious singing surprised the audience".

Mann later attended New College, Oxford, and was awarded a Bachelor of Music degree in 1874 and a Doctor of Music degree in 1882.

In 1874 he married Sarah Ann Rainsford (1854–1918).

== Career ==
Early in his career Mann served as organist of St. Peter's Collegiate Church, Wolverhampton (1870–1871), St. Michael's Church, Tettenhall (1871–1875), and Beverley Minster (1875–1876) before being appointed Director of Music at King's College Chapel, Cambridge, in 1876, a position he held for over 50 years until his death in 1929. During that time was also music master and organist at The Leys School in Cambridge from 1894 to 1922.

Mann did much to raise the reputation of the Choir of King's College to the position of excellence it continues to enjoy today, and was renowned as a vocal trainer whose methods helped to enhance the quality of singing at English cathedrals and choral foundations generally. In 1918 the new Dean of the College, Eric Milner-White, introduced the service of Nine Lessons and Carols on Christmas Eve, and the following year Mann initiated the tradition of using his arrangement of "Once in Royal David's City" as the processional hymn for the service.

In 1888 he published his own edition of "Spem in alium" by Thomas Tallis, which was the first publication ever made of the forty-part motet. He also revised and edited a Psalter with psalm settings pointed for chanting in the Anglican style, which was published in 1912.

He composed several hymn tunes, including "Angel's Story", which was originally written for the hymn "I Love to Hear the Story" but is also sung to the words of "O Jesus, I have promised".

He died in Cambridge in 1929 and is buried in the churchyard at Grantchester. His memoir was published by the Council of King's College the following year.

Cultural offices
Preceded by William Amps	Director of the Music, King's College Cambridge; 1876–1929	Succeeded by Boris Ord
