= Choir of King's College, Cambridge =

English Anglican choir

- Choir
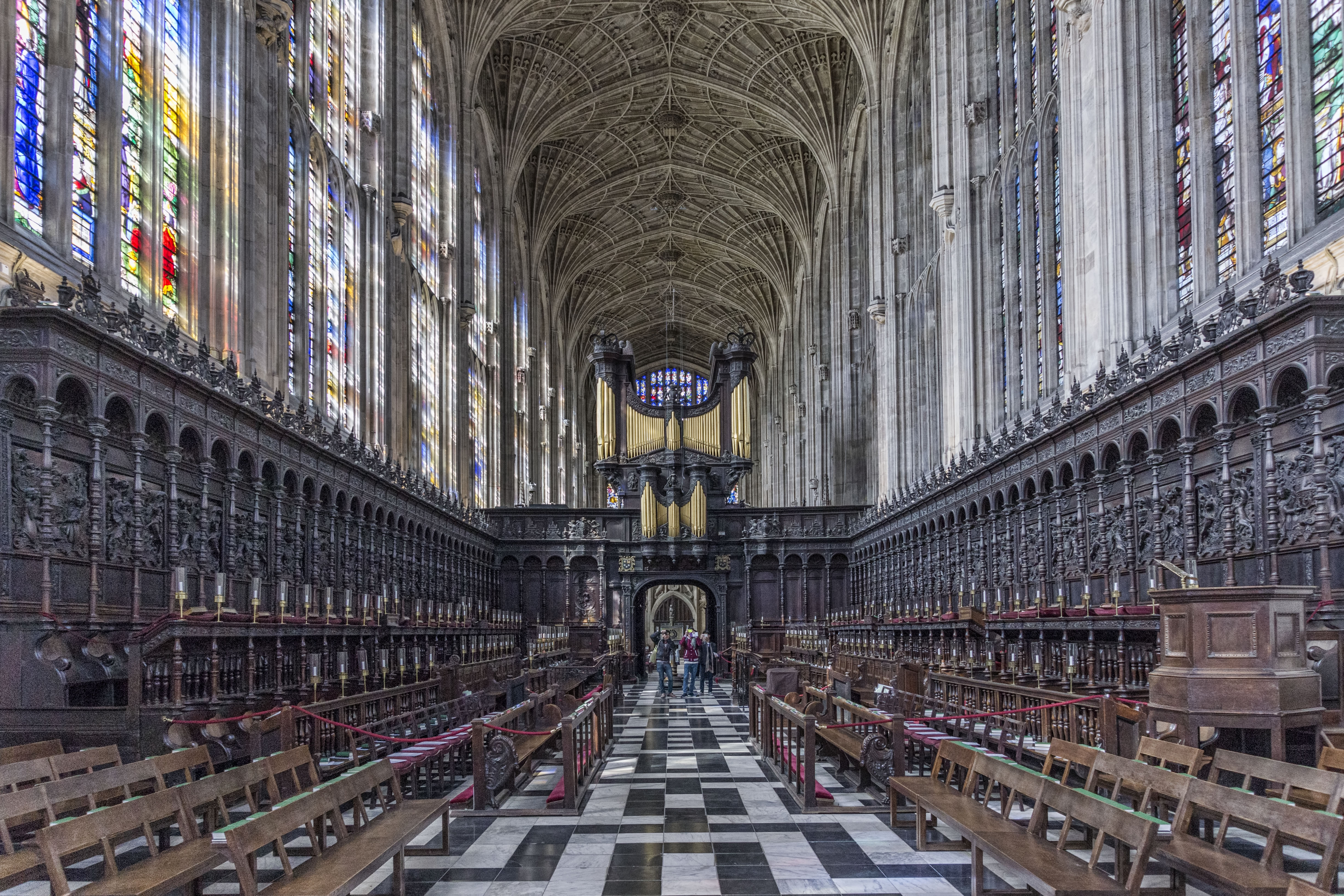
- King's College Chapel, Cambridge
- Founded: 1441; 585 years ago
- Founder: Henry VI of England
- Members: 16 boy choristers aged 7–13; 14 adult choral scholars
- Music director: Daniel Hyde
- Website: www.kings.cam.ac.uk/choir

The Choir of King's College, Cambridge is an English Anglican choir. It was created by King Henry VI, who founded King's College, Cambridge, in 1441, to provide daily singing in his Chapel, which remains the main task of the choir to this day.

Today the choir is directed by Daniel Hyde and derives much of its fame from the Festival of Nine Lessons and Carols, broadcast worldwide to millions on Christmas Eve every year, and the TV service Carols from King's which accompanies it. The choir commissions a carol from a contemporary composer for each year's festival.

== History ==
=== Early history ===
The original statutes specified that the choir should consist of ten chaplains, six clerks (lay singers) and 16 choristers who were to be "poor and needy boys, of sound condition and honest conversation ... knowing competently how to read and sing". Perhaps recognising the workload placed upon the choristers who were to sing Matins, Mass and Vespers daily, the statutes also stated that "they should be doubly occupied with their prescribed duties and with their education".

By 1449 recruitment had resulted in this full choir being in place singing daily services. The choir sang High Mass, Lady Mass and from daybreak, the eight services of the Liturgy of the Hours. In addition the boys alone sang daily "in the finest manner they know" the Little Office of the Blessed Virgin Mary and also the evening votive antiphon.

When Henry VI was deposed during the Wars of the Roses in 1461, a period of brief instability resulted in reduced numbers for a while due to lack of funds. However, in 1479 with the appointment of provost Walter Field the choir came to fulfil the full potential of Henry VI's vision. Field oversaw the acquisition of innovative polyphonic music in the Eton Choirbook style, and appointed a new precentor with expertise in the complicated Salisbury Liturgy.

A peak of splendour was reached under Robert Hacumblen, provost from 1509. This was maintained until the succession of Protestant Edward VI in 1547, when a deterioration in choral music at King's began which lasted until the late Victorian period.

During this time the choir were singing in a temporary chapel, with the main King's College Chapel still under construction. In 1506 Henry VII visited Cambridge and attended evensong, and afterwards resolved to fund continued construction. This was continued by his successor Henry VIII with choral services commencing in the completed chapel in 1544.

Elizabeth I visited the chapel in 1564, and attended evensong on 5 August and again the following night, although she turned up late, causing the service to be restarted. It is recorded that pricksong was sung (an early form of polyphony with a melody performed as a counterpoint to a plainsong) as it likely had been since the foundation of the college.

During Oliver Cromwell's rule the number of choral services was reduced, and departing choristers were not replaced. By 1651 there was only one chorister left and by 1654 there were none. Lay clerks were still retained during this time; it is likely that they sang secular anthems, including on Guy Fawkes Night. Upon the restoration of the monarchy in 1660, ten choristers were appointed immediately; the choir was at full strength by 1666.

In 1827 a survey of choir schools in England noted of King's:

the Choristers attend service in the Chapel once a day in the afternoon on common days; on Sundays and Saints' days twice, morning and evening. They are also permitted to sing at the Chapels of other Colleges, and at St. Mary's Church. They are instructed in singing by the organist, and in reading, writing, and arithmetic by a master appointed by the College. The Statutes prescribe that they should be under 12 years of age at their admission. They are generally admitted about eight years of age, and leave the Choir when the voice breaks.

=== Reform during the nineteenth century ===
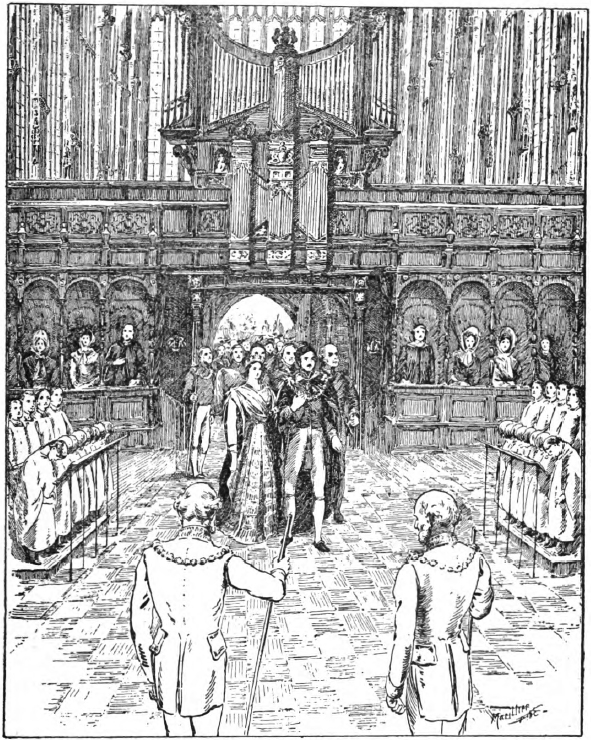
Queen Victoria and Prince Albert in King's College Chapel (1843)

By the 1860s it was recognised that musical standards in the choir needed improvement. John Jebb's 1843 enquiry into Anglican choirs found that

in Cambridge, the Choral Service has suffered mutilation in every place where it is retained. King's College has reduced the original number of its Conduct Chaplains from three to one; and though retaining its sixteen Choristers (which evidently were intended to be proportionate to a more numerous body of adult singers), there are but a small number of Clerks, too weak for the magnificent organ which accompanies them, and for the unrivalled Chapel where they minister. The Choir indeed attends twice daily; but the prayers are not chanted (a very modern innovation), and at the Sunday morning service the Nicene Creed is not sung.

Amongst the lay clerks, whose duties were at this time divided by also singing at Trinity, indiscipline and absenteeism were common.

Reform began after the passing of the Cambridge University Act 1856, which enabled the statutes and governance of the college to be altered. Two chaplains and twelve lay clerks were specified, and sharing duties with Trinity was ended in 1871. The same year a new Master over the Choristers was appointed, who was tasked with being "watchful of their moral conduct" and "maintaining discipline without undue severity at all times". Conditions for choristers were improved with the intention of recruiting boys from a higher social background. They were given instruction in instrumental music and financial assistance upon leaving.

To further widen the field for selection it was decided to open a boarding school instead of paying for choristers to be lodged with local families. From 1876 it was decreed that choristerships should be open to all candidates "whether resident in Cambridge or elsewhere" with those resident outside the city lodged at the expense of the college, and a purpose-built King's College School was opened two years later. Also in 1876 it was decided that choral scholarships were to be awarded, with students replacing the permanently employed lay clerks. Existing contracts meant this was a slow process, with the last clerk leaving in 1928.

1876 also saw the appointment of a new organist on an increased salary, Arthur Henry Mann. There was little if any formal training of choir instructors at this time in England – most were organists who taught the choir following whatever technique they themselves had been subjected to as former choristers. Mann was fortunate in this regard having been a chorister at Norwich Cathedral under the renowned Zechariah Buck. Mann was therefore an outstanding choir trainer himself and greatly improved the reputation of King's College Choir. He worked on improving the diction and timing of the choir to allow them to work with the acoustic of the chapel and its particularly lengthy reverb. He also opened up services to the public, where previously visitors needed written permission to attend.

== Membership of the Choir ==
=== Choristers ===
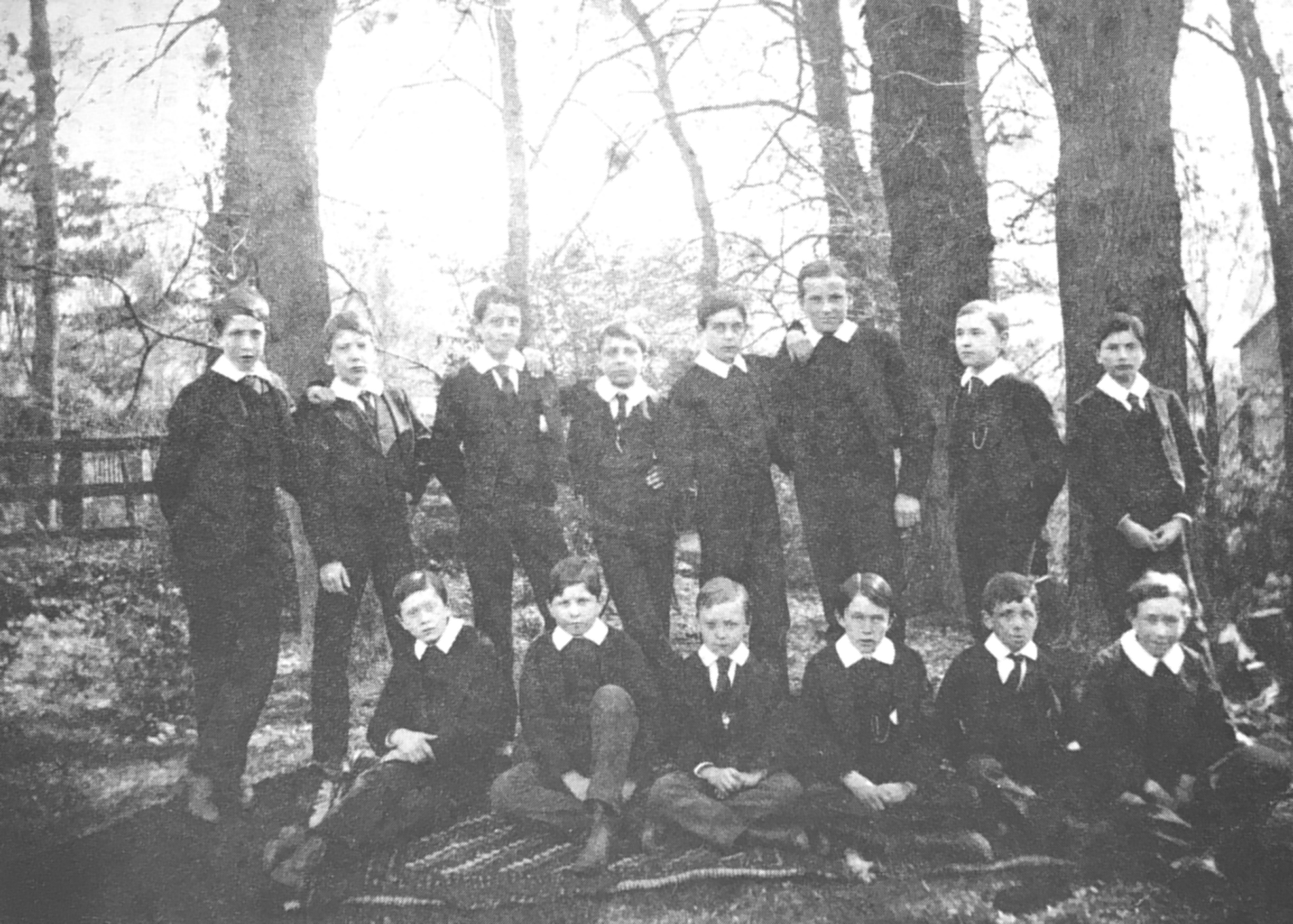
Kings College Choristers 1882

The statutes of the college provide for 16 choristers. These are boys who are educated at King's College School. They come from a variety of backgrounds with bursaries being available to families unable to afford the subsidised school fees. Boys usually join the choir as probationers aged eight following a successful audition at age six or seven. After two years as probationers, they enter the choir as full choristers, departing three years later or earlier if their voice changes.

=== Choral scholars ===
From the beginning of the 20th century, the 14 lower voices of the choir have been provided by undergraduates who sing as choral scholars. These students must gain an academic place at Cambridge University as well as successfully obtaining a choral award at King's College through an audition process. They remain in the choir throughout their typically three-year degree. Although some will study for a degree in music, many study other subjects, with only medicine and architecture being incompatible.

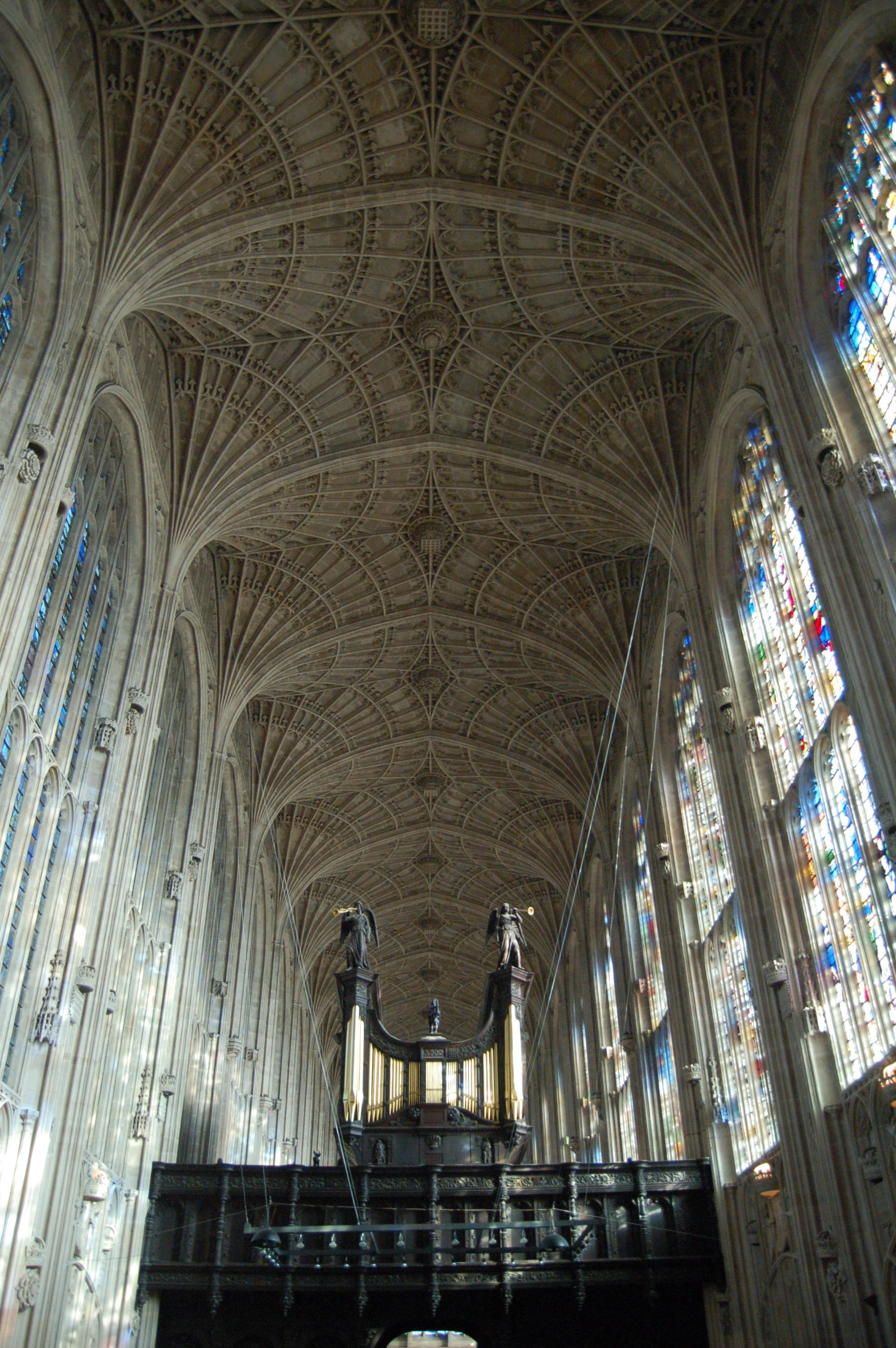
Fan Vault

Very occasionally, a lay clerk may be appointed in place of a choral scholar, usually if a vacancy arises unexpectedly: for example, when a student, having gained a conditional place at the college (subject to A-level grades being achieved) fails to meet the conditions. Such lay clerks have, to all intents and purposes, the same status as a choral scholar. The few lay clerks that have existed (since the establishment of choral scholars) have often been choral scholars agreeing to remain for an additional year.

The choral scholars form collectively, in their spare time, a separate group, The King's Men, singing a wide range of music written for men's voices, from early music through to barbershop arrangements (many of the latter having been written exclusively for the group by present/former Choral Scholars).

==== Groups spawned from the choral scholars ====
Various singing groups have been spawned from groups of Choral Scholars:

- The King's Men, formerly known as Collegium Regale, made up of the current Choral Scholars
- The King's Singers (1968–present)
- The Scholars (1968-2010) and The Scholars Baroque Ensemble
- The Light Blues
- Pange Lingua, directed by Berty Rice (1990s)
- Polyphony (1986–present)

=== Organ Scholars ===
The organ is played by two organ scholars, who, like the choral scholars, are students (typically undergraduates) at the college. An organ Scholarship is awarded as necessary to ensure that there are always two undergraduate organists in the college - a new scholar is appointed to arrive when the previous one graduates. If the director of music is not present for any reason, an organ scholar takes responsibility for conducting the choir.

== Performing and recording activities ==
The choir maintains a strong recording and touring schedule, in addition to its duties at King's College Chapel, in Cambridge.

=== Tours and performances ===
The choir first toured in 1936, visiting Netherlands, Germany, Denmark and Sweden. In recent years, the choir has toured throughout Europe, the US, South America, Australia and Asia.

The choir regularly performs in the United Kingdom, giving concerts in the major London concert halls, as well as at numerous festivals around the country. In 2013, the choir sang at the Prime Minister's Easter reception held at 10 Downing Street. The choir also performs with symphony orchestras, such as the BBC Symphony Orchestra at the BBC Proms in 2005 and 2009, the London Symphony Orchestra, and performs an annual Christmas concert with the Philharmonia Orchestra.

=== Recordings ===
External audio
- You may listen to the Choir of King's College Cambridge conducted by Arthur Henry Mann performing Johann Sebastian Bach's God Liveth Still and Up, Up, My Soul, with Gladness in 1929 here on archive.org

The choir's first commercial release was a 1929 recording of Bach's 'God liveth still' and 'Up, up my heart with gladness' on the His Master's Voice label, released in 1931. In 1963 the choir released a landmark recording of Allegri's Miserere featuring treble soloist Roy Goodman. A little-known work at the time, this release led to it becoming one of the most popular a capella choral works.

The choir has recorded more than 100 albums, on the EMI and Decca labels. In 2013 the choir launched its own label, King's College Recordings, which would allow it to gain more artistic freedom over its releases. Releases on this label include 100 Years of Nine Lessons and Carols which remained at number 1 in the classical charts for nine weeks. The choir has been innovative in its release of recordings, as apart from standard CDs they have offered Super Audio CD, Dolby Atmos, audio Blu-ray, and 24-bit FLAC download versions of albums.

In 2013 the choir began making available recordings of its choral services. These can be listened to on the choir's website. In 2017 for the first time they made the Carols From King's televised Christmas service available as a video download.

== Directors of music and organists ==
The choir is conducted by the director of music, a fellow of the college. Prior to 1876 the choir was conducted by the organist.

- 1606–1619?: John Tomkins
- 1622–1623: Matthew Barton
- 1624–1626: Giles Tomkins
- 1627–1670: Henry Loosemore
- 1670–1726: Thomas Tudway
- 1726–1742: Robert Fuller
- 1742–1799: John Randall
- 1799–1855: John Henry Pratt
- 1855–1876: William Amps
- 1876–1929: Arthur Henry Mann
- 1929–1957: Boris Ord
- 1940–1945: Harold Darke (Boris Ord's substitute during World War II)
- 1957–1973: Sir David Willcocks
- 1974–1982: Sir Philip Ledger
- 1982–2019: Sir Stephen Cleobury
- 2019–present: Daniel Hyde

== Notable musicians who are former members ==
- James Adcock (lay clerk) – Master over the Choristers, composer
- Ralph Allwood (lay clerk) – choral director
- John Angel (lay clerk) – Gentleman of the Chapel Royal
- Benjamin Bayl (organ scholar) – conductor
- Christopher Bowers-Broadbent (chorister) – organist and composer
- David Briggs (organ scholar) – organist
- Timothy Byram-Wigfield (chorister) – organist
- Timothy Brown (choral scholar) – conductor
- Grayston Burgess (choral scholar) – countertenor
- John Carol Case (choral scholar) – baritone
- Clive Carey (chorister) – baritone and composer
- Michael Chance (choral scholar) – countertenor
- Bob Chilcott (chorister and choral scholar) – composer
- David Cordier (chorister) – countertenor
- Robert Cowper (lay clerk) – composer
- Sir Andrew Davis (organ scholar) – conductor
- Richard Farnes (chorister and organ scholar) – conductor
- Gerald Finley (choral scholar) – baritone
- Edward Gardner (choral scholar) – Director of Music, English National Opera
- Orlando Gibbons (chorister) – composer
- James Gilchrist (choral scholar) – tenor
- Peter Godfrey (chorister and choral scholar) - choral conductor
- Roy Goodman (chorister) – conductor
- Francis Grier (organ scholar) – composer
- Ashley Grote (chorister and organ scholar) – organist and conductor
- David Goode (organ scholar) – organist
- Simon Halsey (choral scholar) - choral conductor
- Daniel Hyde (organ scholar) – organist and conductor, returning as Director of Music
- Guy Johnston (chorister) – cellist
- Brian Kay (choral scholar) – bass and radio presenter
- Andrew Kennedy (choral scholar) – tenor
- Stephen Layton (organ scholar) – conductor, director of Polyphony
- Tim Mead (choral scholar) – countertenor
- Mark Padmore (choral scholar) - tenor
- Ben Parry (musician) (choral volunteer) - composer and conductor
- Julian Perkins (choral scholar) – conductor and keyboard player
- Quentin Poole (chorister) – oboist and conductor
- John Potter (chorister) – tenor and academic
- Simon Preston (chorister and organ scholar) – organist and conductor
- Christopher Purves (chorister) – bass-baritone
- Robert Quinney (organ scholar) – choral director and organist
- Ashley Riches (choral scholar) – baritone
- Nigel Rogers (choral scholar) – tenor
- Richard Salter (choral scholar) – baritone
- Mark Stone (choral scholar) – baritone
- Robin Tyson (choral scholar) – countertenor
- Robert Tear (choral scholar) – tenor
- Fred Tomlinson (chorister) – singer and songwriter for Monty Python
- Thomas Trotter (organ scholar) – organist
- Christopher Tye (chorister and lay clerk) – composer
- Stephen Varcoe (choral scholar) – bass-baritone
- James Vivian (organ scholar) – organist
- Sir David Willcocks (organ scholar) – conductor
- Jonathan Willcocks (chorister) – composer and conductor.
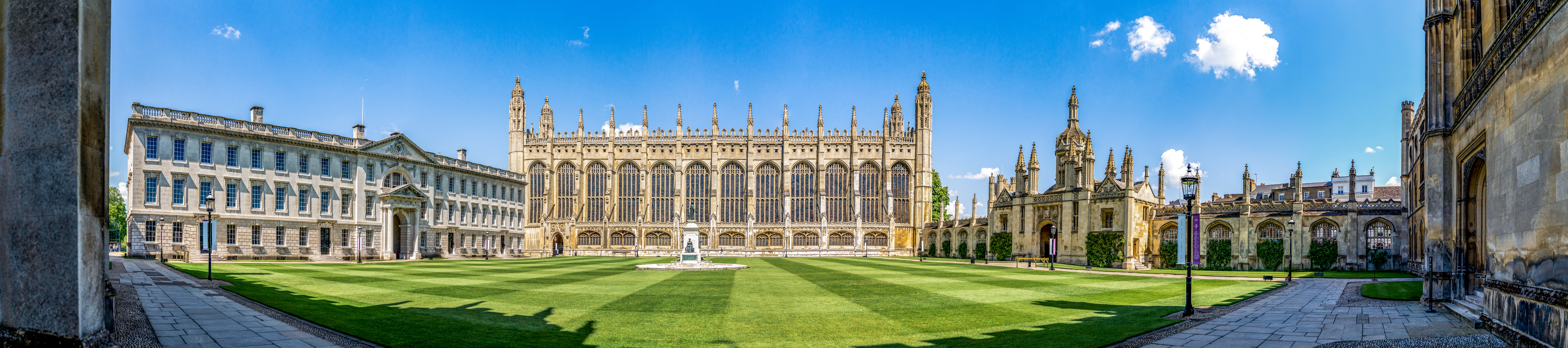
Great Court of King's College
