= Carl Rütti =

Swiss composer (born 1949)

Carl Rütti (born March 24, 1949, in Fribourg) is a notable Swiss composer, who has written much choral music.

== Life ==
Rütti grew up in Zug, Switzerland. He took his A levels at the monastery school in Engelberg, then studied music at the Zürich Conservatoire, finishing in 1975 with a Solisten-diploma in piano and organ. In 1976 he studied under Kendall Taylor and Richard Latham in London. Some of his compositions for a cappella choir were recorded by the choir of Brompton Oratory, London (1978), and the BBC Singers, and broadcast by the BBC (1982). Since then he has composed a steady output of largely religious choral works, including Alpha et Omega, a Magnificat and Nunc dimittis, the 11-part Missa Angelorum and a setting of O magnum mysterium. His compositions also include a setting, with a new tune, of the carol I Wonder as I Wander, which has been performed several times in recent years as part of King's College Cambridge's Festival of Nine Lessons and Carols.

Rütti's music blends the English choral tradition with other genres including jazz and the blues. His work has been performed all over the world. Many of his works have been recorded on CD.

In 2005, Rütti was commissioned by the Bach Choir to write a Requiem. This was completed in 2007.

In 2013 he composed a Symphony for soprano, organ, percussion and orchestra entitled "The Visions of Niklaus von Flüe".

He teaches piano at Zürich Conservatoire, gives concerts and recitals as a pianist and organist, and is the organist of the local church in Oberägeri, Zug.

== Selected recordings ==
- Requiem Olivia Robinson, Edward Price, The Bach Choir, Southern Sinfonia, David Hill Naxos, DDD, 2009
