= James Adcock =

English choral singer and director

James Adcock (1778 – 30 April 1860) was an English choral singer and director.

He was a native of Eton, Berkshire, England. In 1786, he joined the choir of St. George's Chapel, Windsor, under Edward Webb and then Theodore Aylward Sr., and in Eton College Chapel under William Sexton. In 1797, he was appointed lay clerk in St. George's Chapel, and obtained a similar appointment at Eton two years later.

Soon afterwards, he resigned those places and went to Cambridge, where he was admitted a member of the choirs of Trinity, St. John's, and King's Colleges. Afterwards, he became master of the choristers of King's College.

He published several glees of his own composition, and The Rudiments of Singing, with about thirty solfeggi to assist persons wishing to sing at sight.
