= Daniel Hyde (organist) =

English choral conductor and organist (born 1980)

Daniel Hyde (born 1980) is a choral conductor and organist. In 2019 he became director of music for the Choir of King's College, Cambridge, having previously served as organist and director of music at Saint Thomas Church in New York.

== Early life and education ==
Hyde sang as a chorister in the choir of Durham Cathedral, attending the Chorister School from the age of 7. When his voice broke a year before he was due to leave the choir, his attention turned to the organ. He became a Fellow of the Royal College of Organists at the age of 17, whilst a boy at Oakham School, and was later an organ scholar at Durham Cathedral during a gap year.

== Career ==
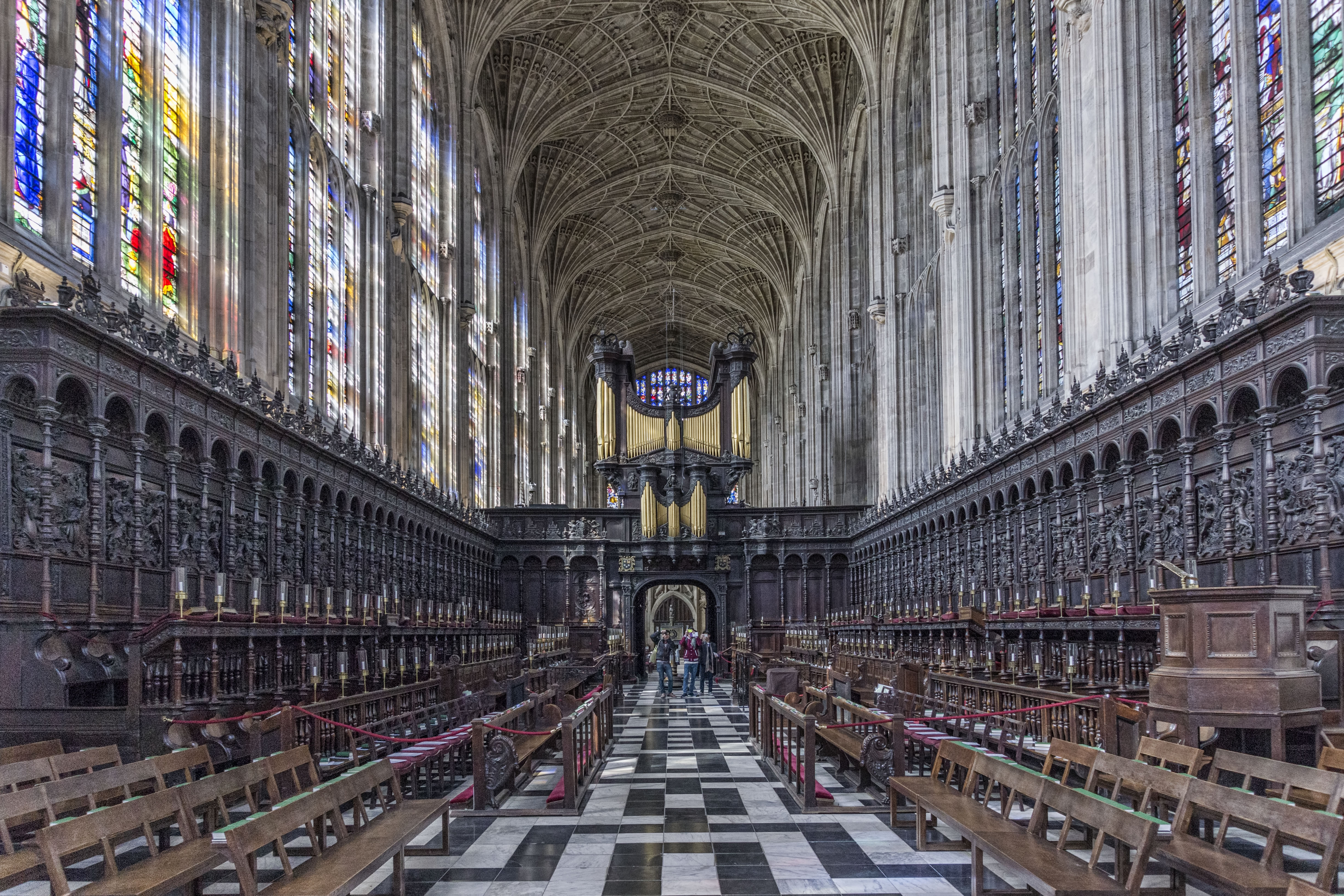
The choir stalls and great organ of King's College Chapel, Cambridge, where Hyde has served as Director of Music since 2019.

After Durham, Hyde spent a year as assistant organist at St George's Cathedral in Perth, Western Australia, from 1998 to 1999. He was awarded an organ scholarship at King's College, Cambridge, which he commenced in 2000.

Upon graduation from King's College, Cambridge, he served as the director of music at Jesus College, Cambridge. From 2009 to 2016 he held the position of informator choristarum, organist and tutorial fellow in music at Magdalen College, Oxford, where he was the University Lecturer in the Faculty of Music.

From 2016 to 2019 he served as organist and director of music at Saint Thomas Church in New York before succeeding Stephen Cleobury as director of music for the Choir of King's College, Cambridge, in 2019.

With King's College Choir, Hyde undertakes an extensive touring schedule, with recent destinations including The Netherlands, Germany, Estonia, USA, Canada and Australia.

As a conductor, Hyde has also worked with ensembles such as the BBC Singers, the Britten Sinfonia, the Orchestra of the Age of Enlightenment and the Academy of St Martin in the Fields. He has recorded a number of CDs, and has played at the BBC Proms on numerous occasions.

In September 2024, he was appointed musical director and principal conductor of the City of London Choir.

Preceded by John Scott	Organist and Director of Music, Saint Thomas Church, New York; 2016–2019	Succeeded by Jeremy Filsell
Preceded by Stephen Cleobury	Director of Music, King's College, Cambridge; 2019–	Succeeded by Incumbent
