= King's College Chapel, Cambridge =

Church at King's College, Cambridge

King's College Chapel
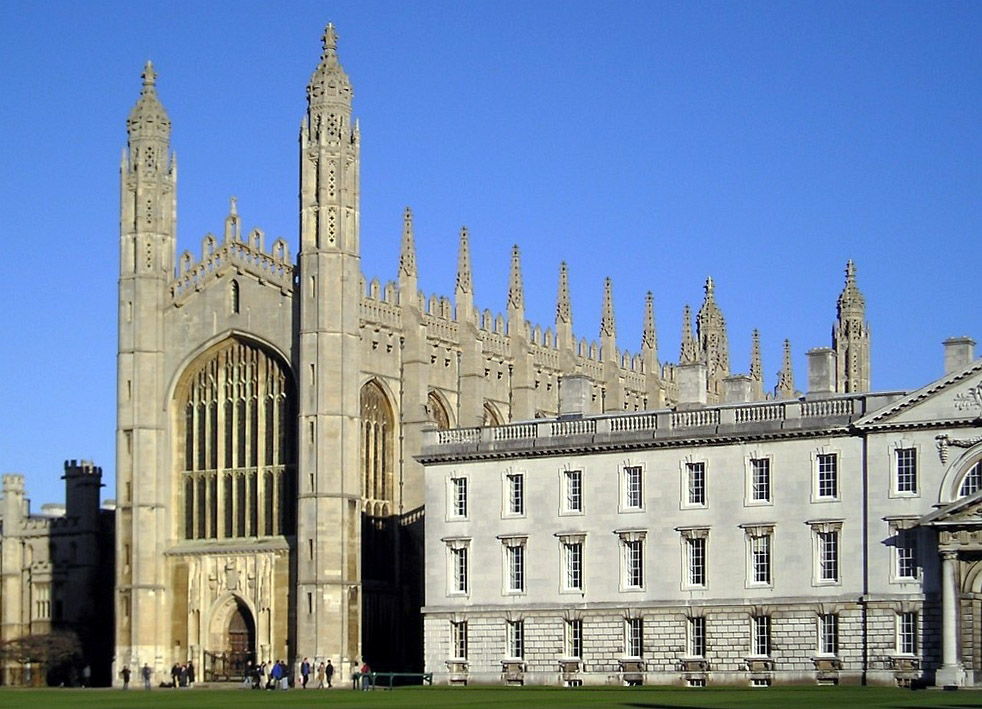
- King's College Chapel (partly obscured by the Gibbs' Building) seen from The Backs
- King's College Chapel
- 52.2048°N 0.1165°E
- Location: Cambridge
- Country: England
- Denomination: Church of England
- Previous denomination: Roman Catholic

History
- Status: Collegiate chapel
- Founder: Henry VI of England
- Dedication: Our Lady and Saint Nicholas

Architecture
- Functional status: Active
- Heritage designation: Grade I listed
- Designated: 26 April 1950
- Architect(s): Reginald Ely (1448-c.1471), John Wolryche (c.1471-1477), Simon Clerk (1477-1489), John Wastell (1508-1515)
- Architectural type: Church
- Style: Perpendicular Gothic
- Years built: 1448–1515

Specifications
- Length: 289 feet (88 m)
- Width: Vault: 40 feet (12 m)
- Height: Interior: 80 feet (24 m); Exterior: 94 feet (29 m)

Clergy
- Dean: The Revd Canon Dr Hueston Finlay

King's College Chapel is the chapel of King's College in the University of Cambridge. It is considered one of the finest examples of Perpendicular Gothic architecture and features the world's largest fan vault. The Chapel was built in phases by a succession of kings of England from 1448 to 1515, a period which spanned the Wars of the Roses and three subsequent decades. The Chapel's large stained glass windows were completed by 1531, and its early Renaissance pulpitum was erected in 1532–36. The Chapel is an active place of worship, and home of the King's College Choir. It is a landmark and a commonly used symbol of the city of Cambridge.

== History ==
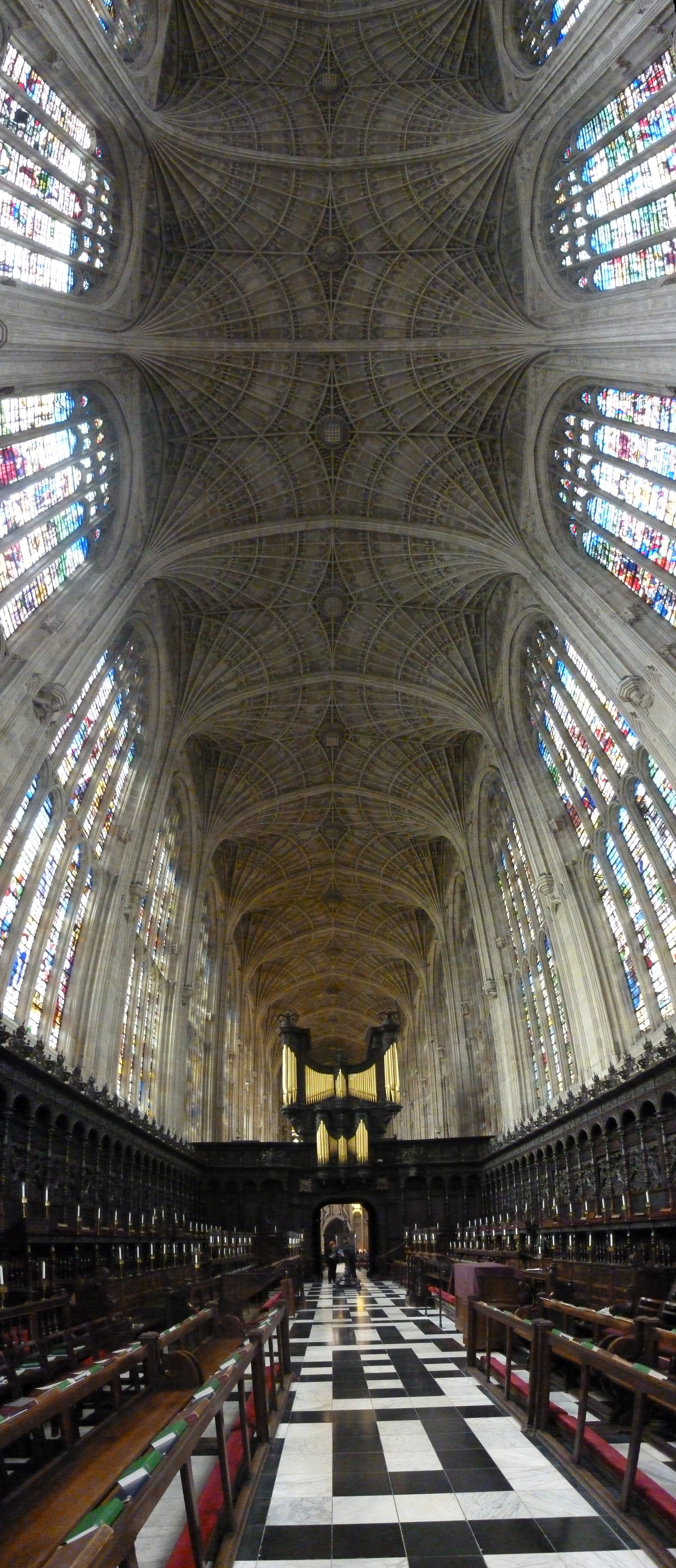
The fan vault, looking west

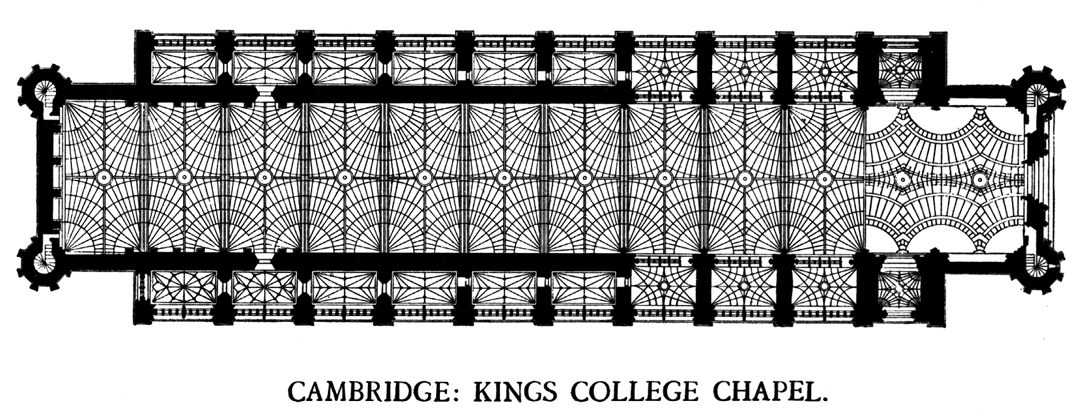
Fan vaulting diagram

Henry VI planned a university counterpart to Eton College (whose chapel is very similar, but not on the scale intended by Henry). This foundation was begun 1441 on a small site, now the Old Schools. It had a small chapel, which was begun in 1444. However, Henry soon greatly expanded his scheme, demolishing a large swathe of the town to begin a large court and chapel, the dimensions of which were specified in his Will and Intent of 12 March 1448. The first stone of the Chapel was laid, by Henry himself, on the Feast of St James the Apostle, 25 July 1446. Reginald Ely was most likely the architect and worked on the site from 1446, initially as part of the original, smaller, scheme. Two years earlier he was charged with sourcing craftsmen for the chapel's construction. He continued to work on the site until his death in 1471, having designed the general form of the chapel and completed the eastern parts up to the transoms of the windows. The original plans called for lierne vaulting, and the piers of the choir were built to conform with them. Ely probably designed the window tracery at the extreme east of the church's north side: the east window of the easternmost side chapel, which unlike the Perpendicular style of the others is in curvilinear Gothic style. The priest and later bishop Nicholas Close (or Cloos) was recorded as the "surveyor", having been the curate of St John Zachary, a church demolished to make way for the Chapel.

The pace of building was greatly reduced after the fall of Henry VI in 1461 - the new king, Edward IV, starved the Lancastrian projects at King's and Eton of funds. As a consequence, the expensive stone vault was abandoned, with a timber roof being substituted, and the grand scheme for the whole college was shelved, not to be taken up again until the 18th century. After Ely's death, he was followed as master mason by John Wolryche, who raised the eastern parts to the heads of the windows, and Simon Clerk, who completed and roofed the eastern five bays. Henry VII visited in 1506, paying for the work to resume and leaving money so that the work could continue after his death. In 1515, under Henry VIII, the shell of the building was completed. The Chapel features the world's largest fan vault, constructed between 1512 and 1515 by master mason John Wastell. It also features fine medieval stained glass.

Many religious sites suffered damage during the English Civil War as Puritans sought to remove or deface iconography they considered inappropriate. Although Parliamentarian troops stationed in Cambridge used the chapel as a training ground, the building was largely untouched. Some sources suggest that Oliver Cromwell, who had studied at Cambridge, ordered its protection. Near the altar, on the north and south walls, there is still graffiti left by the soldiers. During the Second World War, most of the chapel's stained glass was placed in storage as a precautionary measure, but the chapel again avoided damage.

== Rubens painting ==
Above the altar is The Adoration of the Magi by Rubens, painted in 1634 for the Convent of the White Nuns at Louvain in Belgium. The painting was installed in the Chapel in 1968 amid national controversy; this involved the lowering of the Sanctuary floor leading up to the High Altar. It had been believed that gradations were created in 1774 by James Essex, when Essex had in fact lowered the floor by 5 1/2 inches, but at the demolition of these steps, it was found that the floor instead rested on Tudor brick arches.

During the removal of these Tudor steps, built at the Founder's specific request that the high altar should be 3 ft above the choir floor, human remains in intact lead coffins with brass plaques were discovered, dating from the 15th to 18th centuries, and were disinterred.

The eventual installation of the Rubens was also not without problems: once seen beneath the east window, a conflict was felt between the picture's swirling colours and those of the stained glass. The Rubens was also a similar shape to the window, which "dwarfed it and made it look rather like a dependent postage stamp". Plain shutters were proposed, one on each side, to give it a triptych shape (although the picture was never part of a triptych) and lend it independence of form, which is how one sees the Rubens today. The installation was designed by architect Sir Martyn Beckett, who was "philosophical about the furore this inevitably occasioned - which quickly became acceptance of a solution to a difficult problem."

== Stained glass windows ==
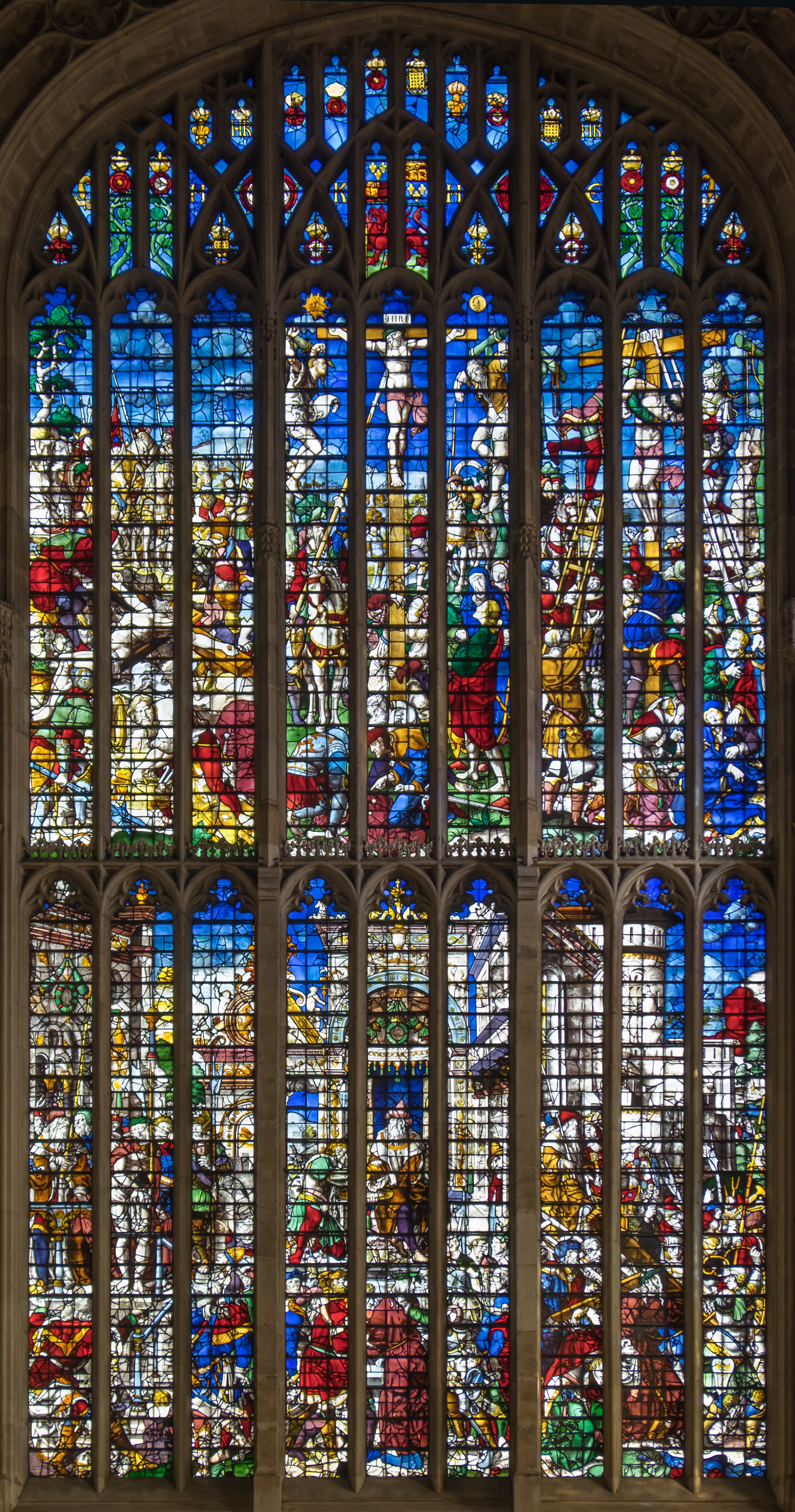
The Great East Window

The windows of King's College Chapel are some of the finest in the world from their era. There are 12 large windows on each side of the Chapel, and larger windows at the east and west ends. With the exception of the west window, they are by Flemish hands and date from 1515 to 1531. Barnard Flower, the first non-Englishman appointed as the King's Glazier, completed four windows. Galyon Hone and three partners (two English and one Flemish) are responsible for the east window and 16 others between 1526 and 1531. The final four were made by Francis Williamson and Symon Symondes. The one modern window is that in the west wall, which was donated by King's alumnus Francis Stacey and is by the Clayton and Bell company and dates from 1879.

== Pulpitum ==
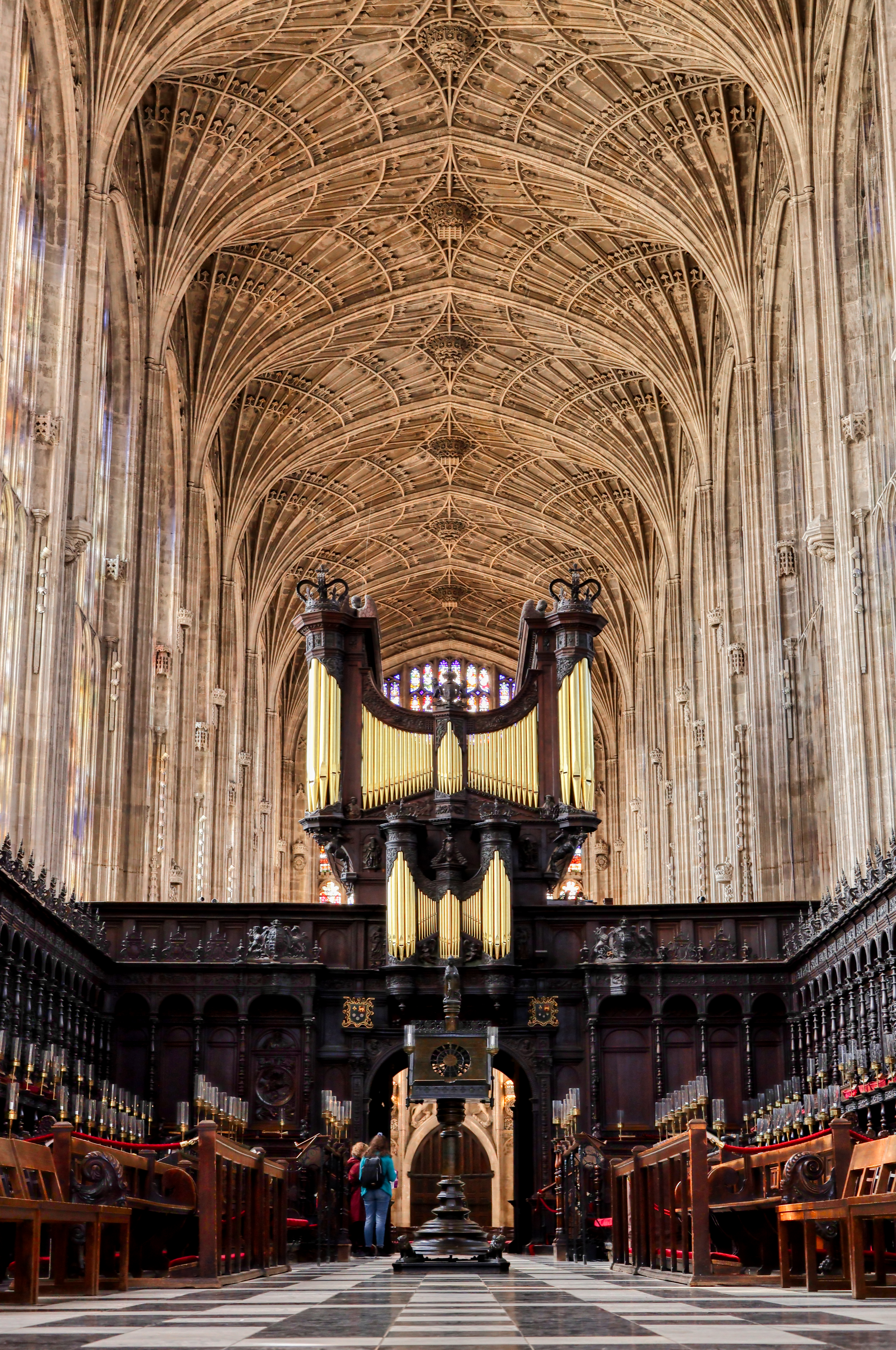
The rood screen, organ, and fan vault

This large wooden screen, which separates the ante-chapel from the choir and supports the organ, was erected in 1532–36 by Henry VIII in celebration of his marriage to Anne Boleyn. The screen is an example of early Renaissance architecture: a striking contrast to the Perpendicular Gothic Chapel; Sir Nikolaus Pevsner said it is "the most exquisite piece of Italian decoration surviving in England".

== Current use ==
The Chapel is actively used as a place of worship and also for some concerts and college events. Notable college events include the annual King's College Music Society May Week Concert, held on the Monday of May Week. The event is popular with students, alumni, and visitors to the city.

The Chapel is noted for its splendid acoustics. The world-famous Choir of King's College, Cambridge, consists of choral scholars, organ scholars (male students at the college), and choristers (boys educated at the nearby King's College School). From 1982 until shortly before his death on 22 November 2019 the director of music for the choir was Sir Stephen Cleobury. It is currently Daniel Hyde. The choir sings services on most days in term-time, and also performs concerts and makes recordings and broadcasts.

The BBC has broadcast the Choir's Nine Lessons and Carols from the chapel on Christmas Eve, during which a solo treble sings the first verse of Once in Royal David's City. There is also a chapel choir of male and female students, King's Voices, which sings Evensong on Mondays during term-time.

The chapel is widely seen as a symbol of Cambridge (for example in the logo of Cambridge City Council).

== Dean of the Chapel ==
The Dean of the Chapel is responsible to the College Council and the Governing Body for the conduct of services within the Chapel. King's College Chapel, like other Cambridge colleges, is not formally part of the structure of the Church of England, but the Dean is customarily licensed by the Bishop of Ely. Both he and the Chaplain take a regular part in chapel services: each is normally present at services six days a week during Full Term, and each preaches once or twice a term. The Chapel is run by a Chapel Committee chaired by the Dean. A Use of Choirs Committee, also chaired by the Dean, organises the engagements of the Chapel choir.

The current Chaplain is Revd Mary Kells, who has been in the post since September 2021. She was preceded in the post by Revd Ayla Lepine (2020–2021). Revd Tom McLean served as Interim Chaplain in 2020. He followed the Revd Andrew Hammond, who held the role of Chaplain from 2015 to 2019, after the Revd Richard Lloyd Morgan who served from 2003 to 2014.

=== Recent deans ===
- 1890 to 1893 – The Revd Dr Alfred Hands Cooke
- 1894 to 1918 – The Revd Dr Alan England Brooke
- 1918 to 1941 – The Very Revd Eric Milner-White
- 1942 to 1948 – The Rt Revd Archibald Rollo Graham Campbell
- 1949 to 1956 – The Revd Ivor Erskine St Clair Ramsay
- 1956 to 1966 – The Revd Dr Alexander Roper Vidler
- 1966 to 1970 – The Very Revd Dr David Lawrence Edwards
- 1970 to 1981 – The Very Revd Michael Stanley Till
- 1981 to 1991 – The Very Revd John Henry Drury
- 1991 to 2001 – The Revd Canon Prof. George Pattison
- January to September 2002 – The Revd Canon Martin Shaw (temporary Dean)
- 2002 to 2004 – The Revd Prof. Christopher John Ryan
- 2005 to 2009 – The Revd Ian Malcolm Thompson
- 2010 to 2014 – The Revd Dr Jeremy Morris
- 2014 to 2026 – The Revd Dr Stephen Cherry
- 2026 to present – The Revd Canon Dr Hueston Finlay

== Gallery ==
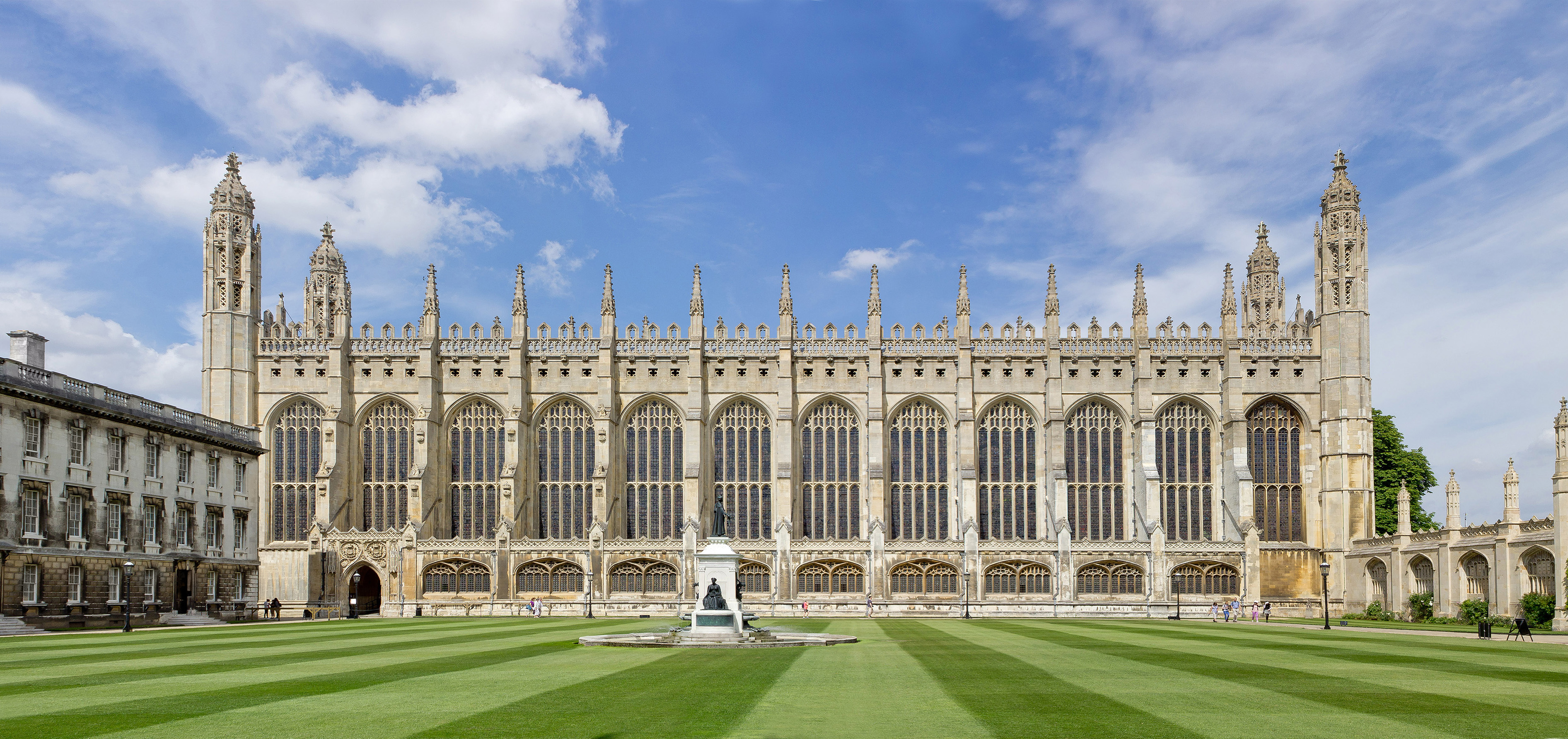
Side view of the Chapel

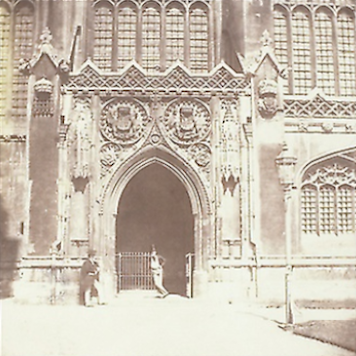
King's College Chapel, Cambridge, South Entrance, by Henry Fox Talbot, c. 1845

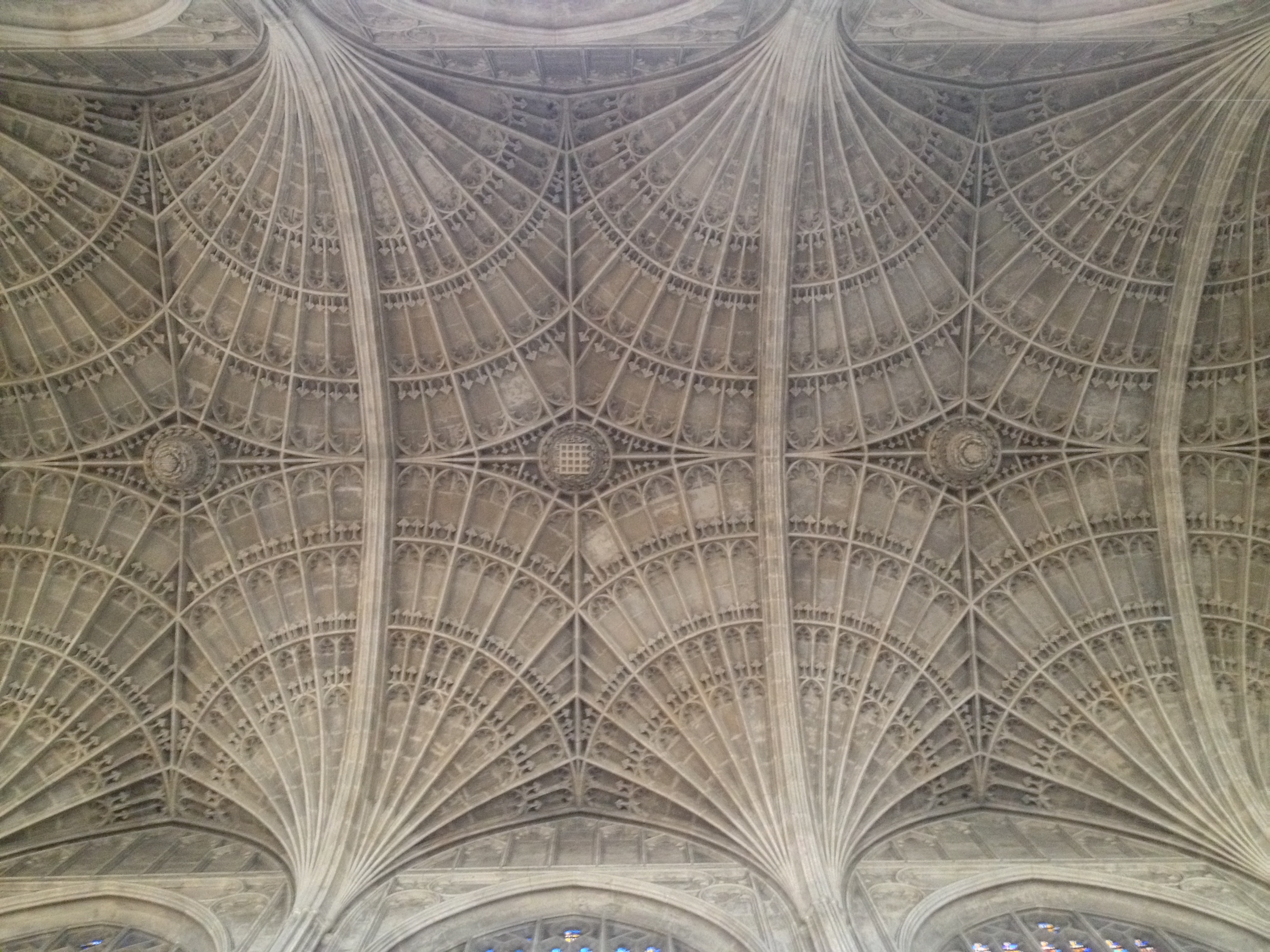
The vault of King's College Chapel

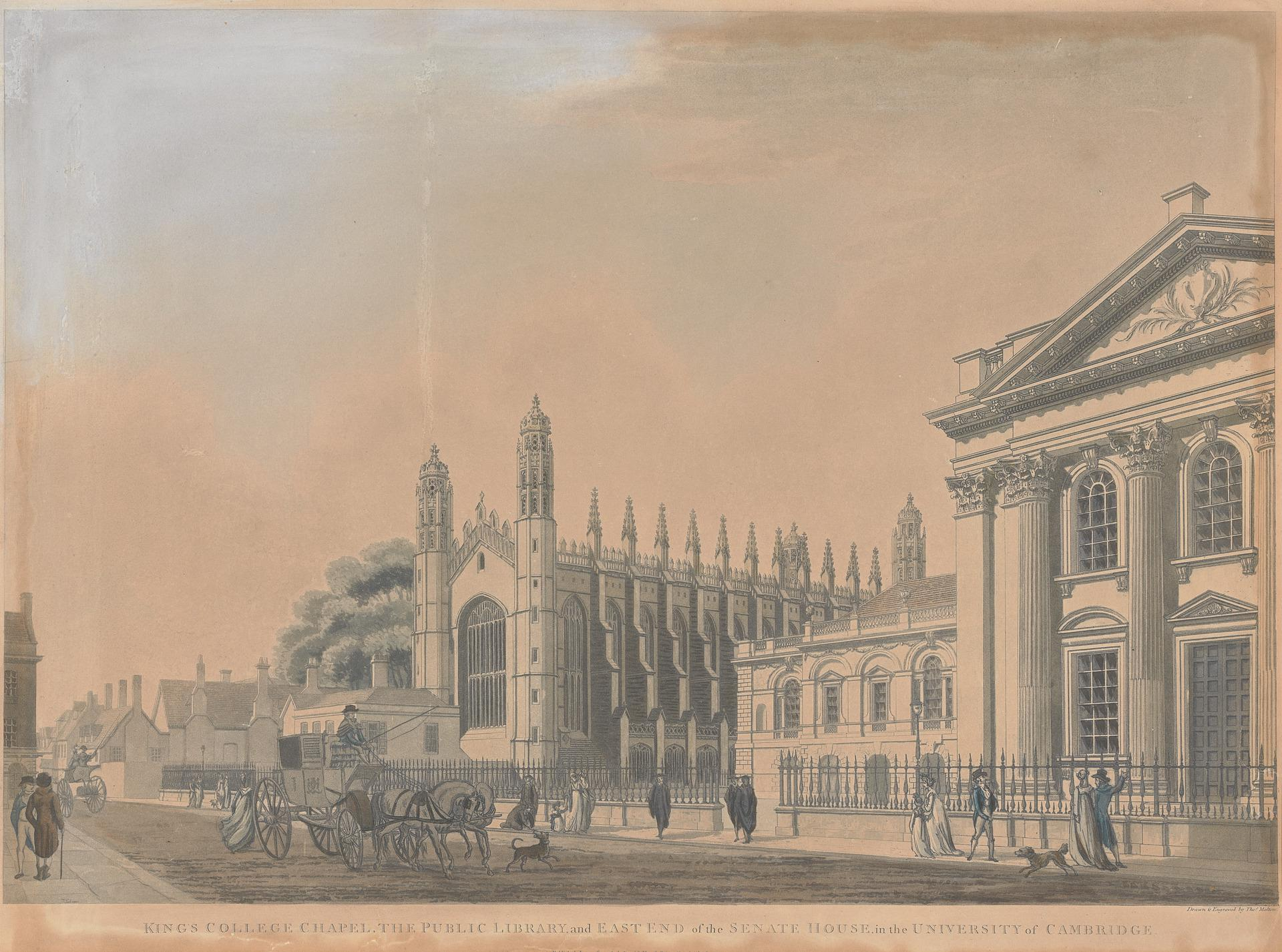
Landscape painting of the Chapel by Thomas Malton, dated 1798

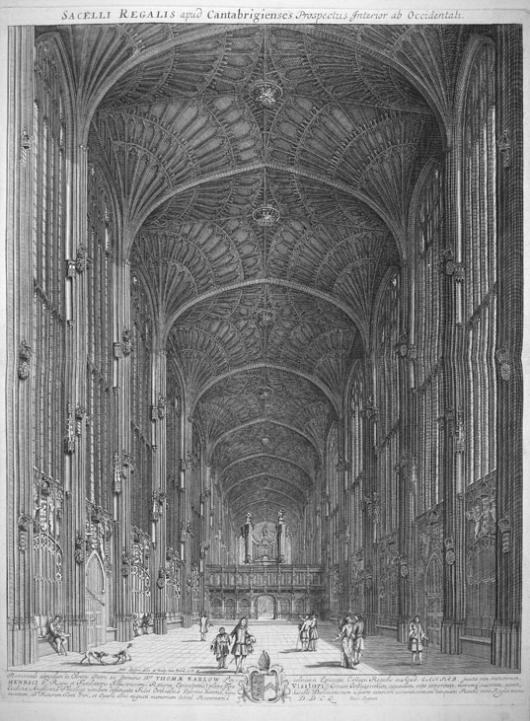
Engraving of the interior of the Chapel by David Loggan, published 1690

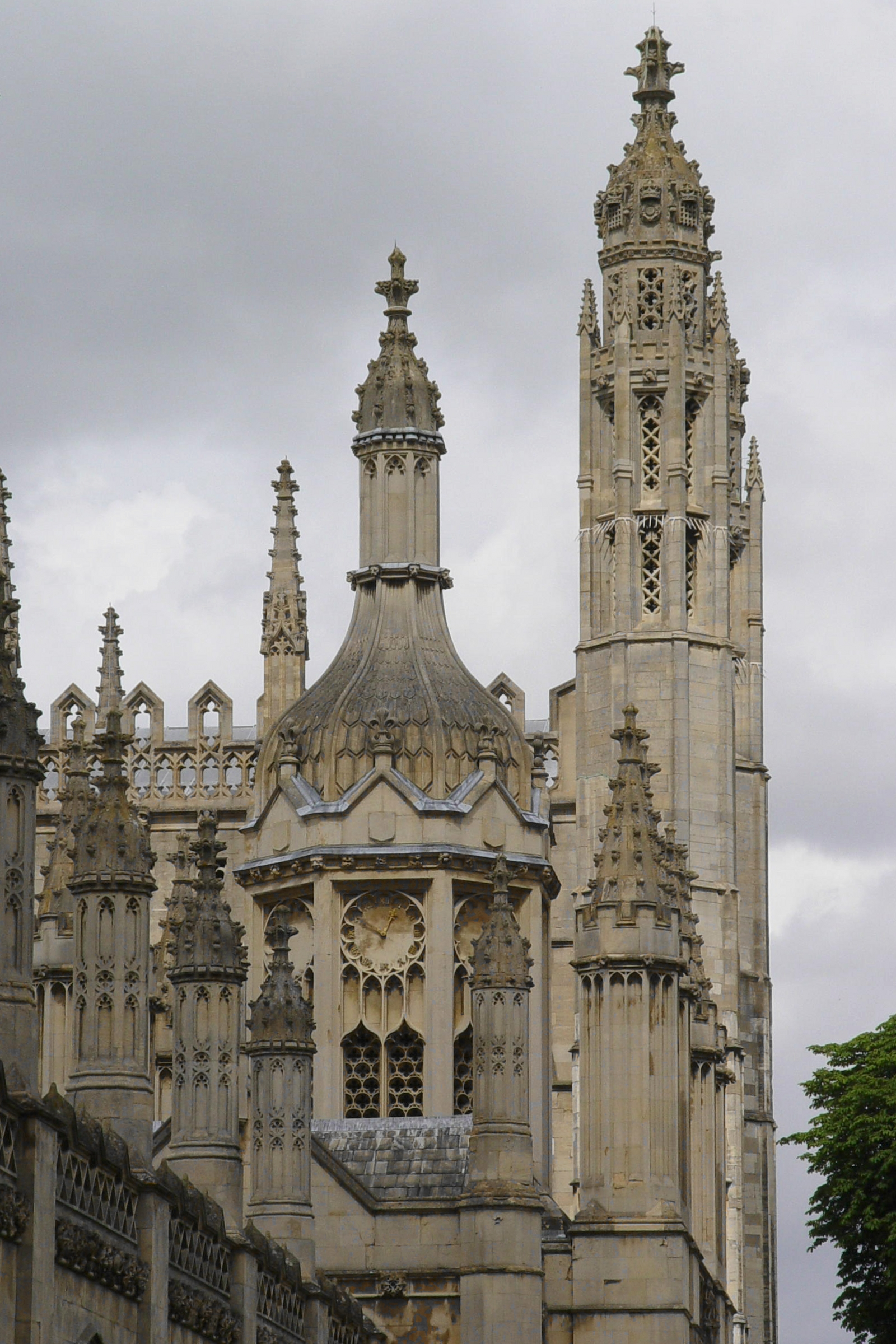
The Chapel towers

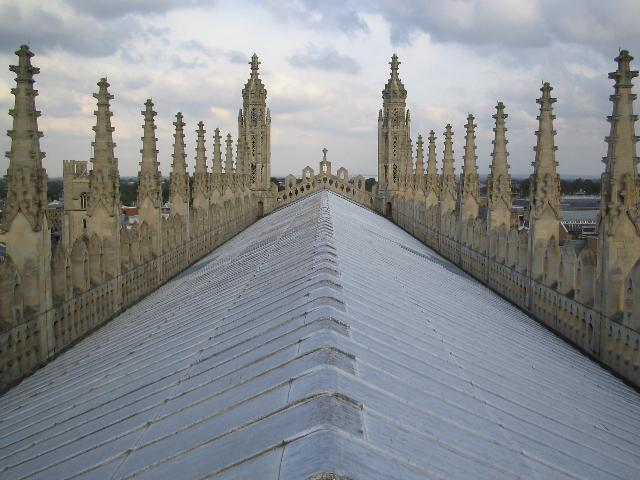
The Chapel roof

== Bibliography ==
- Hicks, Carola (2007). The King's Glass: A Story of Tudor Power and Secret Art. London: Chatto & Windus. ISBN 978-0-701-17992-2.
- Warrior, Josephine (1994). A Guide to King's College Chapel, Cambridge. Cambridge: King's College.
- Woodman, Francis (1986). The Architectural History of King's College Chapel, and its Place in the Development of Late Gothic Architecture in England and France. London: Routledge & Kegan Paul. ISBN 0-7100-9871-5.
