= Jonathan Rennert =

British musician

Jonathan Rennert (born 17 March 1952) is an English organist, conductor and writer. He gave his debut broadcast organ recital at the age of 19 in Westminster Cathedral, having become a Fellow of the Royal College of Organists at 18.

Rennert studied at the Royal College of Music under Richard Popplewell, John Barstow and William Lloyd Webber, and at Cambridge (where he was organ scholar of St John's College) under George Guest and Gillian Weir. Awards included Cambridge University's John Stewart of Rannoch Scholarship in Sacred Music and 'Greater London Arts Association Young Musician 1975'. Short periods based in London and at St Matthew's, Ottawa were followed by his appointment in 1979 as Director of Music of St Michael's Cornhill, the church which has been his base for over 45 years. Here he has given more than 400 of the weekly lunchtime organ recitals, and continued the musical traditions of such predecessors as William Boyce (the 18th-century composer) and Harold Darke.

He has tended to specialise in the music of J S Bach and romantic English composers, though he also gives first performances of new music. He has given organ recitals in many countries, and in 'celebrity' series at the Royal Festival Hall, St Paul's Cathedral and Westminster Abbey, and was Musician-in-Residence at Grace Cathedral, San Francisco. There are several CDs, including a choral disc of music by George Dyson in which Rennert conducted St Michael's Singers and the Royal Philharmonic Orchestra. Other choirs of which he has been chief conductor include the Elizabethan Singers and St Cecilia Chorus.

His writings include biographies of the infant prodigy and composer William Crotch (1975) and of the organist George Thalben-Ball (1979). He has served as President of The Organ Club, Warden of the Incorporated Society of Musicians and Master of the Worshipful Company of Musicians. He is a senior moderating examiner for the Associated Board of the Royal Schools of Music.
