= Obadiah Shuttleworth =

English composer, violinist and organist

Obadiah Shuttleworth (died 1734), English composer, violinist and organist, was the son of Thomas Shuttleworth of Spitalfields in London. Thomas was a professional music copyist and harpsichord player.

The exact date of Shuttleworth's birth is uncertain.

Shuttleworth was an excellent violinist and in the early 18th century he took part in the influential public concerts arranged by the London coal merchant Thomas Britton (known as 'the musical small coal man') at his business premises in Clerkenwell to which musical professionals and amateurs from all ranks of London society were drawn. Shuttleworth also led concerts that were later established about 1728 at the Swan Tavern, Cornhill. The 18th-century musical historian, Sir John Hawkins, wrote of him that he 'played the violin to such a degree of perfection, as gave him a rank among the first masters of his time'.

In January 1724, according to the newspaper the British Journal (11 January 1724), Shuttleworth was made organist at the church of St Michael, Cornhill, having previously been the organist at St Mary's, Whitechapel. On 4 May 1729 the London newspaper The London Evening Post announced his appointment as organist of the Temple Church. According to Hawkins, Shuttleworth was 'celebrated for his fine finger on the organ, and drew numbers to hear him, especially at the Temple Church where he would frequently play near an hour after evening service'. He retained both organist appointments until his death on 2 May 1734. A widow and two daughters survived him.

While several works by Shuttleworth (concertos, sonatas, solos, and cantatas) are known from various sources, the only extant works by him are two concerti grossi, for two solo violins and string orchestra, arranged from the opus 5 solo sonatas by Arcangelo Corelli (1653–1713), that were published in London in 1726. If, as some leading scholars now believe, Francesco Geminiani's 1726 concerto arrangements from the same set of Corelli sonatas were probably the first to be published in England that required two violin soloists, then Obadiah Shuttleworth has the distinction of being the first Englishman to publish such concertos, in a form that would come to dominate English string concertos of the early 18th century.

Cultural offices
| Preceded by Philip Hart | Organist of St Michael, Cornhill; 1723-1734 | Succeeded by Joseph Kelway |
