= Thomas Britton =

English charcoal merchant, chemist and concert promoter

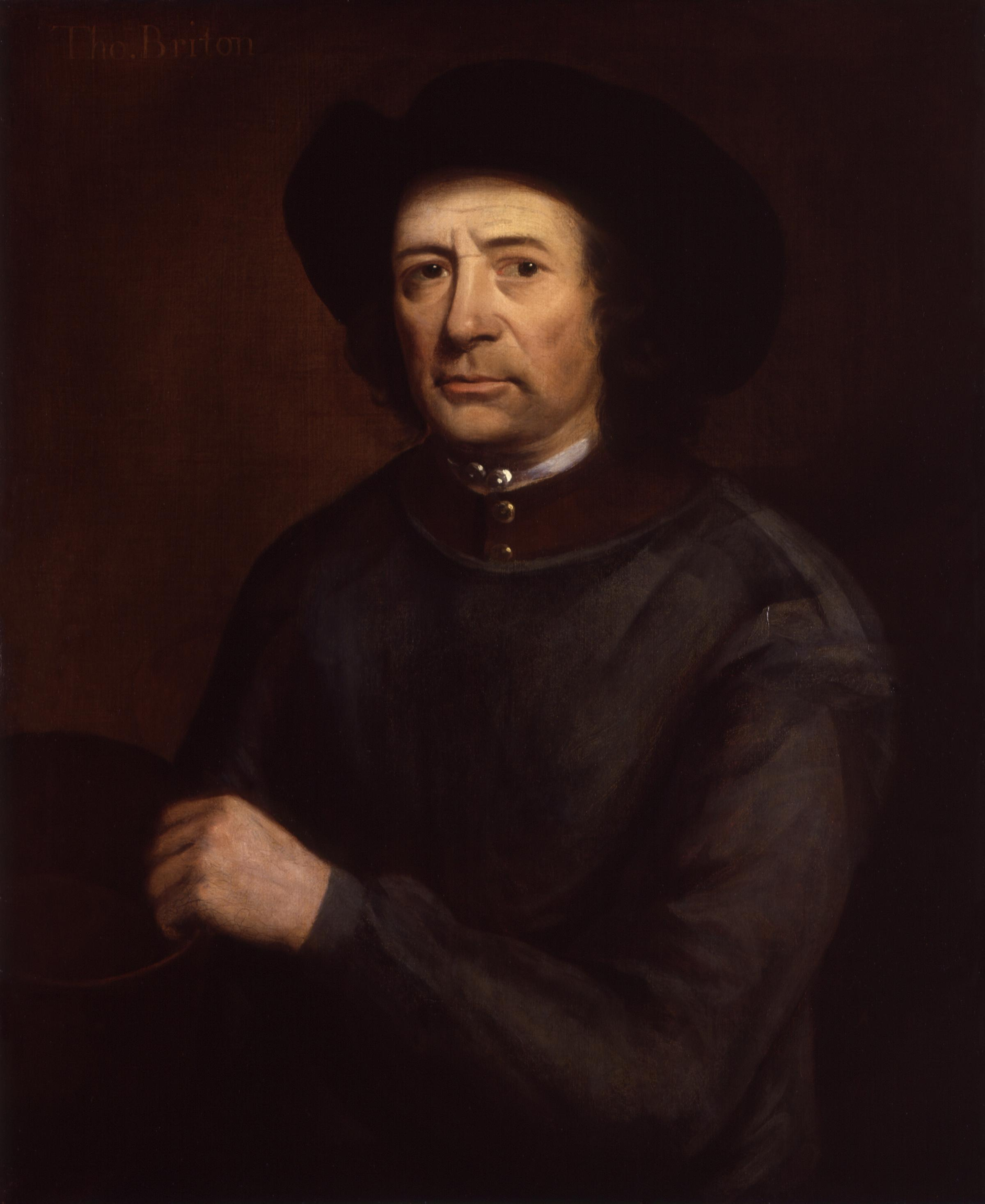
- Born: 14 January 1644; Rushden, Northamptonshire
- Died: 27 September 1714 (aged 70); Clerkenwell, Middlesex
- Occupations: Charcoal merchant and concert promoter

Thomas Britton (14 January 1644 – 27 September 1714) was an English charcoal merchant best known as a concert promoter.

== Biography ==
Born in Rushden, Northamptonshire, Britton moved to London at a young age and apprenticed himself to a small coal-man (a charcoal merchant) in Clerkenwell. He learnt the trade and returned to his home village, but soon returned to London in search of better opportunities. Setting up a business to rival that of his former master, he turned a stable off Aylesbury Street into his store and home.

In London, Britton became known for his singing voice. His business proved successful, and he spent much of his spare income on building up a library. Through this activity, he became known to other book collectors, and was able to meet and discuss literature with various nobles.

Britton also studied chemistry under the tutelage of his neighbour Theophilus Garencières. He constructed a moving laboratory for Garencières, and a Welsh friend of the scientist paid Britton to construct a similar building for him. Garencières and Britton became friends, and also shared a love of esoteric ideas, Britton having an interest in Rosicrucianism.

In 1678, Britton fitted the loft of his Clerkenwell house out as a tiny concert hall, fitting a harpsichord and an organ with only five stops. Despite the unglamorous venue, accessible only by an external staircase, the relative novelty of a series of concerts, coupled with the support of Roger L'Estrange, who inaugurated the venue with a performance on the viol, attracted a considerable audience.

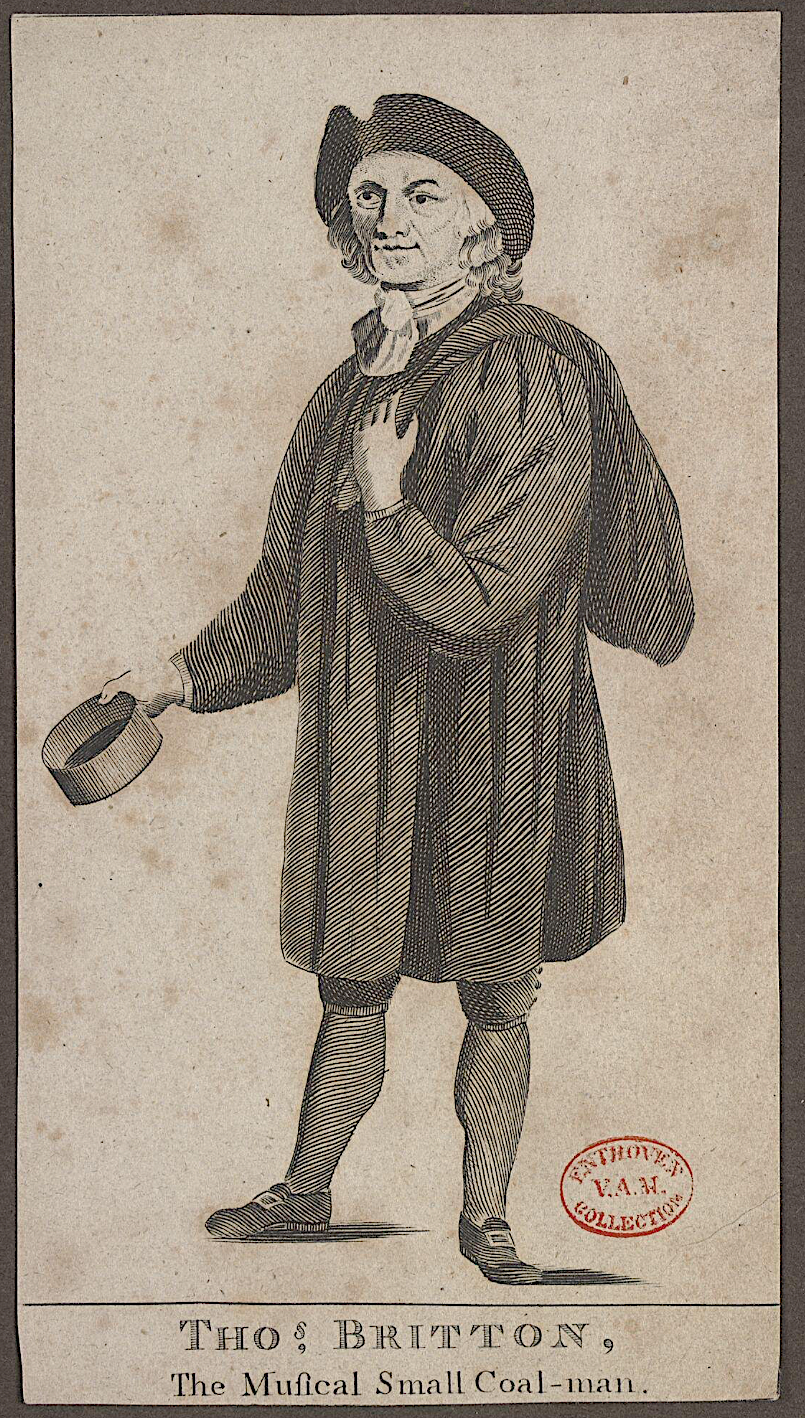
Thos Britton the Musical Small Coal-man (unknown artist, c.1800: Victoria and Albert Museum)

Britton's knowledge of literature and the arts became well known, and his modest and honest nature and acceptance of his social position was often noted. These were qualities appreciated by contemporaries who considered themselves socially superior. His concerts became regarded as the premier venue for chamber music in London, with an audience drawn from a wide social strata. At first, concerts were free, but Britton later requested an annual subscription of ten shillings, considered exceptionally low even at the time. By 1712, Ralph Thoresby was able to note: "In our way home called at Mr. Britton's, the noted small-coal man, where we heard a noble concert of music, vocal and instrumental, the best in town, which for many years past he has had weekly for his own entertainment, and of the gentry, &c., gratis, to which most foreigners of distinction, for the fancy of it, occasionally resort."

Britton's social successes sparked some jealousy, and his concerts were alleged to be meeting places for religious dissenters, atheists, or forums for political intrigue. However, their accessibility and the popularity of Britton gradually put paid to these rumours.

The most highly regarded musicians in the nation came to play at Britton's house, including J. C. Pepusch, John Banister, Philip Hart, Abel Whichelo and it is generally held even George Frideric Handel, as did amateurs including John Hughes, Henry Needler and J. Woolaston. Matthew Dubourg played in public for the first time at Britton's, while Obadiah Shuttleworth is said to have learnt the organ specifically to be accepted as part of Britton's crowd. Britton himself played the viol de gamba and the recorder, and began to compose short pieces. Samuel Pepys regarded Britton as an expert on Tudor liturgical music. He amassed a large music collection and selection of musical instruments for the gatherings, and designed his own programmes.

In 1694, Britton auctioned a substantial part of his library. Despite his social successes and considerable income, he continued to work as a small coal-man all his life.

In September 1714, Justice Robe, a Middlesex magistrate, decided to play a practical joke on the superstitious Britton. He employed a ventriloquist named Honeyman to project his voice and tell Britton that his end was near and that he should fall to his knees and repeat the Lord's Prayer. The elderly Britton did so, and was so affected that he died within a couple of days. He was buried at St James's Church, Clerkenwell on 1 October 1714, his funeral attracting a large crowd.

== Legacy ==
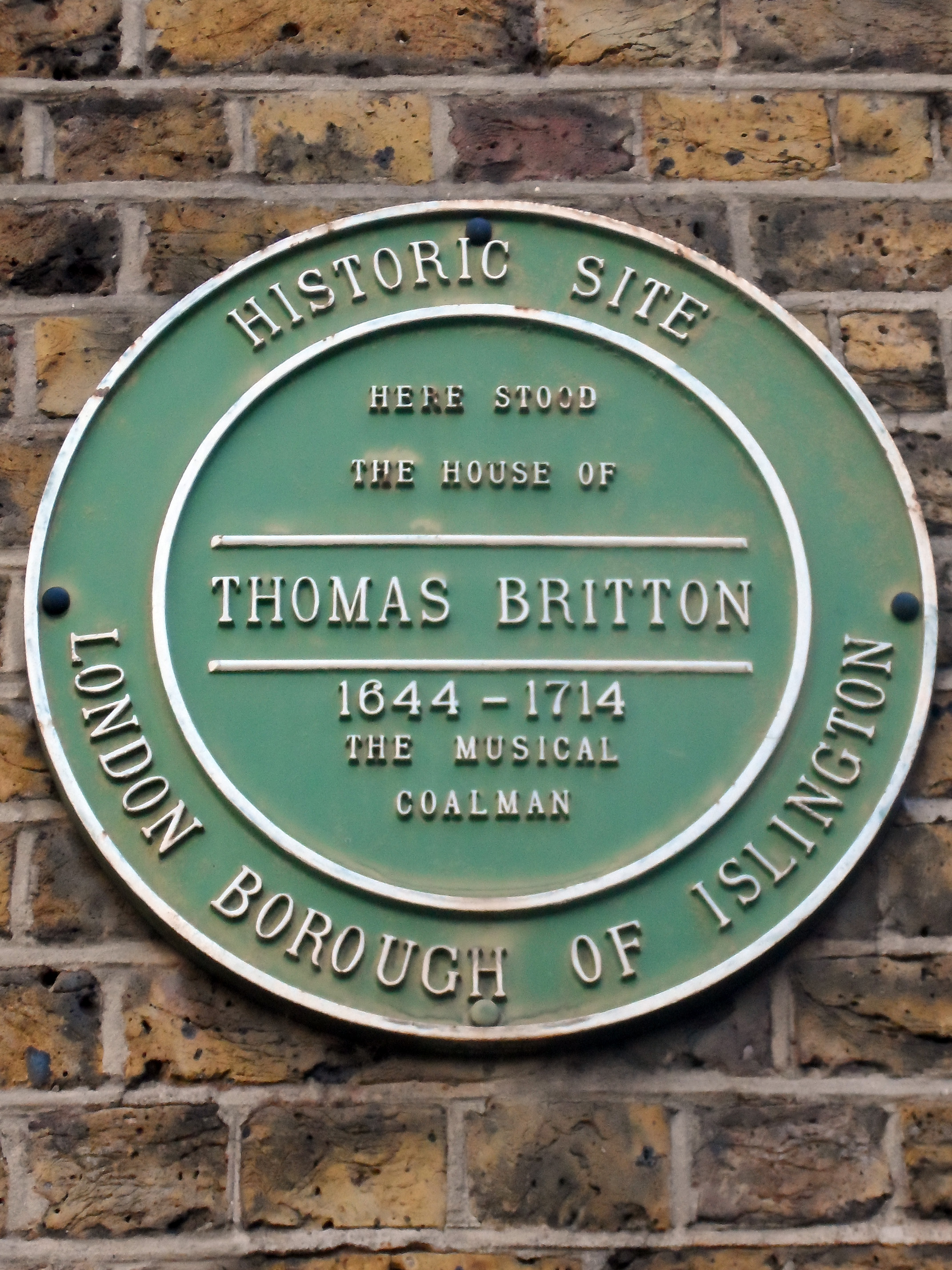
Green plaque at the site of Britten's house.

Following his death, Britton's widow sold his collection of music, which was mostly purchased by Hans Sloane.

A green plaque placed by the London Borough of Islington commemorates the site of his house in Jerusalem Passage, London EC1.
