= Deirdre McKay =

Irish composer (born 1972)

- Born: 1972 (age 53–54); County Down, Northern Ireland
- Occupation: Composer

Deirdre McKay (born 1972) is a composer from Northern Ireland.

== Biography ==
Deirdre McKay was born in County Down. She started violin lessons at an early age and later began to compose with the encouragement of her teacher, Bob Leonard. Following music studies at Queen’s University, Belfast and at the University of Manchester, she studied privately with Kevin Volans in Dublin. Returning to Queen’s on a Department of Education of Northern Ireland scholarship in 2003, she received a doctorate under the tutelage of Piers Hellawell.

== Performances and commissions ==
She has collaborated on work with the Belfast artist Jean Duncan including "A pale yellow sky" and "The Fly". Her piece "Comendo spiritum meum", which incorporates the last words of St Oliver Plunkett, was premiered by the Latvian State Choir in 2007. "Dieppe" a setting of the poem by Samuel Beckett, was selected for the 12th International Review of Composers in Belgrade and also by James MacMillan for a BBC Singers workshop.

Her opera, Driven, with a libretto by Richard Dormer, was commissioned by Northern Ireland Opera and was premiered during the 2012 Cultural Olympiad.

== Awards ==
- British Academy Award to study at the University of Manchester.
- Director’s Choice Award in Boston Metro Opera’s 2013 International Composers’ Competition
- Major Individual Artist Award from the Arts Council of Northern Ireland in 2016
