= Jean Duncan =

Jean Duncan may refer to:

- Jean Duncan (umpire)
- Jean Duncan (artist)
