= Harold Darke =

English composer and organist (1888–1976)

- Born: Harold Edwin Darke; 29 October 1888; London, England
- Died: 28 November 1976 (aged 88); Cambridge, England
- Occupations: Organist, composer
- Era: 20th-century
- Spouse: Dora Garland

Harold Edwin Darke CBE (29 October 1888 – 28 November 1976) was an English composer and organist. He is particularly known for his choral compositions, which are an established part of the repertoire of Anglican church music. Darke had a fifty-year association with the church of St Michael, Cornhill, in the City of London.

== Life before Cornhill ==
Darke was born in Highbury, north London, the youngest son of Samuel Darke and Arundel Bourne. He attended Dame Alice Owen's School in Islington. His initial teachers were Arthur Berridge and Fountain Meen.

In 1903 he gained a scholarship to the Royal College of Music where his teachers were Frank Bridge, Walter Parratt, Hubert Parry, Charles Villiers Stanford, Charles Wood, and Herbert Sharpe.

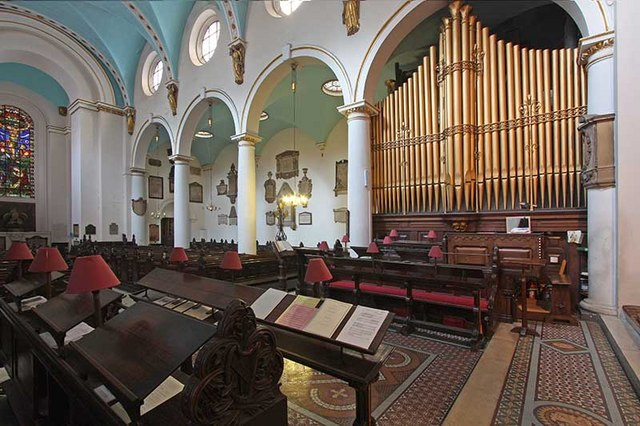
Darke served for 50 years at St Michael's Church, Cornhill, London

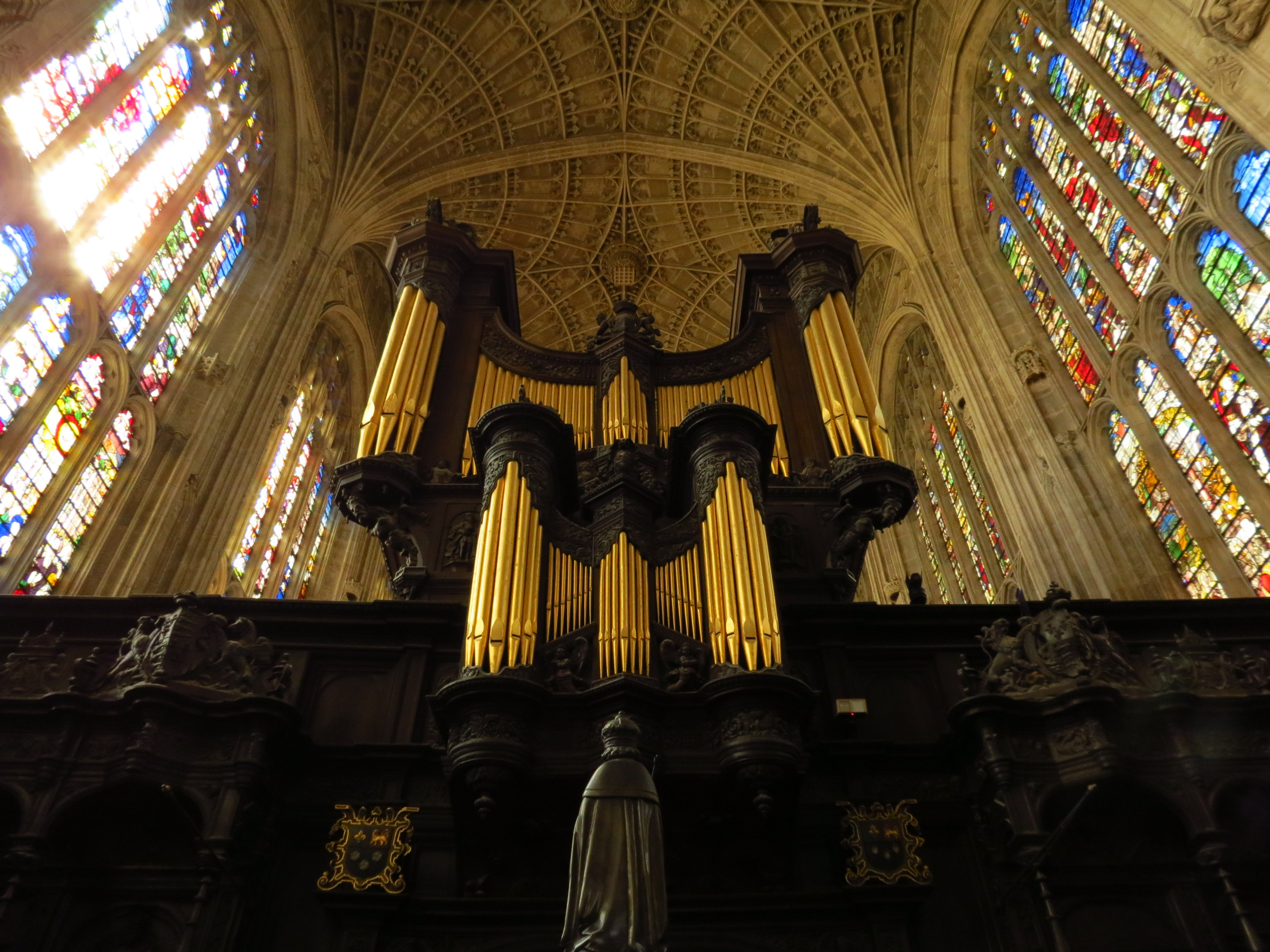
Darke served as acting Director of Music at King's College, Cambridge during World War II

His first organist post came in 1904 at the Stoke Newington Presbyterian Church. From 1906 to 1911 he was the organist at Emmanuel Church, West Hampstead. He became a Fellow of the Royal College of Organists (FRCO) in 1907. Between 1911 and 1916 he was the organist at St James's Church, Paddington.

He served in the Royal Air Force during World War I.

== Life at Cornhill ==
He became organist at St Michael Cornhill in 1916, and in 1917 was awarded a Mus.Doc. degree from Oxford University. He married Dora Garland, at St Michaels Church, Cornhill, on 25 July 1918. Dora was a violinist and was the first woman to lead the Queen's Hall Orchestra. He remained at St Michael Cornhill until 1966, except for a brief war-time interregnum in 1941 to deputise for Boris Ord as Director of Music at King's College, Cambridge.

It is widely accepted that the Cornhill Lunchtime Organ Recitals series begun by Darke in 1916 is the longest-running lunchtime organ concert series in the world. His midday recitals each Monday, playing Bach in the legato style of Schweitzer, made him a City institution. The series has flourished under his successors Richard Popplewell 1966–1979 and the present organist, Jonathan Rennert, from 1979. Darke also served as organ professor at the Royal College of Music from 1919 to 1969.

Darke's work as Conductor of St Michael's Singers was crowned in 1956 (on the occasion of the Choir's 40th Anniversary) with first performances of a number of now well-established works composed especially for the occasion – notably An English Mass by Herbert Howells, Hierusalem by George Dyson, and A Vision of Aeroplanes by Ralph Vaughan Williams.

== Life after Cornhill ==
Darke continued to be active in his later years. He recorded Elgar's Organ Sonata in his early 70s and gave recitals at the Royal Festival Hall to mark his 75th, 80th and 85th birthdays. He died in Cambridge, UK, aged 88 on 28 November 1976.

== Compositions ==
His 1909 setting of Christina Rossetti's "In the Bleak Midwinter" is often sung at the service of Nine Lessons and Carols at King's College, Cambridge, and at similar services around the world.

In a poll of choral experts and choirmasters that was published in BBC Music Magazine on 7 December 2008, "In the Bleak Midwinter" was voted the greatest Christmas carol of all time. Comparing Darke's setting to another popular setting by Gustav Holst, Deputy Editor Jeremy Pound expressed the view that "While Gustav Holst's charming setting of 1909 is rightly loved by millions worldwide, it is the less well known but infinitely more stylish setting by Harold Darke from two years later that convincingly won the day in our poll." Together with ‘Cradle Hymn’ and ‘A Christmas Carmen’, it is dedicated to Margaret Agnes Calkin.

Most of Darke's other compositions that are still performed are settings of the Anglican liturgy, especially his three Communion Services in E minor, F, and A minor; and his Magnificat and Nunc Dimittis in F. The short cantata As the Leaves Fall, (1917), setting words by the soldier poet Joseph Courtney (1891-1973), has been recorded by the Guildford Cathedral Choir, along with a later cantata, The Kingdom of God (1921), setting Francis Thompson.

Organ

- Suite in D minor: Prelude, Pastorale, Toccata
- Prelude and Fugue on "Heinlein"
- Rhapsody in E, Op. 4
- Prelude on "Windsor"
- Prelude in Memory of Parry
- Three Hymn Preludes, Op. 20: St. Peter, Darwall's 148th, On a Theme of Tallis
- Fantasy in E, Op. 39
- Meditation on Brother James' Air
- Retrospection
- Bridal Procession

Choir

- As the Leaves Fall, Op. 26 (1917), soprano solo, SATB choir and orchestra
- Be strong and of good courage (1964)
- Blessed is the man that endureth temptation (1916)
- A Christmas Carmen (1916) SATB
- Communion Service in E minor
- Communion Service in F
- Communion Service in A minor
- Cradle Hymn Solo/unison
- Evening Service in F
- Evening Service in A minor
- Harvest Cantata "The Sower" for Solo Quartet, Choir and Organ. Published (1929) by OUP
- In the Bleak Midwinter
- Jubilate for chorus & organ in F major
- The Kingdom of God, Op. 31 (1921), soprano solo, SATB choir and orchestra
- Love came down at Christmas SATB
- O Brother Man (1935)
- O gladsome light, Op. 38 No 2 (1929)
- Psalm 10
- Te Deum for chorus & organ in F major

Church of England titles
Preceded by George Frederick Vincent	Organist of St Michael, Cornhill; 1916–1966	Succeeded by Richard Popplewell
