= John Malchair =

- Born: Johannes Baptiste Malchair baptised January 1730; Cologne, Germany
- Died: November 1812; Oxford, England
- Known for: Landscape drawing and painting
- Movement: Early Romanticism
- Patrons: Robert Price

John Baptist Malchair (ca. 1730 – 1812) was a German-born watercolour-artist, violinist, drawing master, and collector of traditional European music. He is described as “one of the most distinctive figures of eighteenth century Oxford”, and is recognised as having been an influence on later landscape artists, including John Constable.

== Life and work ==
John Malchair was baptised as Johannes Baptist Malscher on 15 January 1730, in St Peter's Church, Cologne. He was the son of Elizabetta Roggieri and Joannes Malchair, a watchmaker. He became a chorister at Cologne Cathedral in 1744, which began his career in music. At the age of twenty-four, he moved to Nancy, where he worked as a musician and teacher, and began painting landscapes. In 1750 he came to England, where he was to spend the rest of his life. After initially working in London as a violinist and drawing master, he moved to Lewes, where he met and came under the patronage of the artist Robert Price. In the next decade, he spent time in Bristol, Sussex, Hereford and Wales.

In 1760, perhaps assisted by Price's brother-in-law, Shute Barrington, John Malchair was appointed as the leader of the Oxford Music Room (later to become the Holywell Music Room). On 24 October 1760 he was described as being of Holywell parish in Oxford when he married Elizabeth Jenner at her parish church of St George's Church, Hanover Square, London. and the couple settled in Oxford. Malchair worked as a drawing teacher, musician, and collector of music, becoming a respected figure in the city. He lived at the present 12 Broad Street in St Michael's parish. He resigned from the Music Room in 1792 following an incident in which his violin was broken by an orange thrown during a concert.
In his later life, Malchair became blind. He continued collecting and composing music, which was notated by his friend William Crotch, the organist at Christ Church.
Malchair died in Oxford in 1812 and was buried inside St Michael's Church in Cornmarket.

=== Music collection and composition ===
Alongside his work at the Music Room, Malchair took an interest in traditional ‘National’ music. He recorded the melodies that he heard in Oxford: including the music of military bands, the popular airs whistled by the townspeople, and the melodies of the singers and musicians in the streets of the city. He produced at least three volumes of collected music, one of which is in the collection of The English Folk Dance and Song Society.
Malchair's work provided the foundation for William Crotch's 1808 work Specimens of Various Styles of Music. Some of Malchair's own original violin and piano compositions survive in Crotch's manuscripts, and owe much to the folk tradition. However, his most enduring musical work was a clock-chime composed for Gloucester Cathedral, where it can still be heard.

=== Visual art and teaching ===
Malchair was a talented watercolour artist, producing hundreds of paintings of English landscapes. His legacy is the collection of hundreds of sketches and watercolours of historical, architectural and topographical interest. His work features many of the mediaeval Oxford buildings which were destroyed following the passing of the 1771 'Mileways Act', and these paintings often provide a unique record of this architecture.
Malchair was one of the most influential drawing masters active in Britain in the last two decades of the eighteenth century, with notable pupils including Sir George Beaumont, Heneage Finch, William Crotch, and John Austen, brother of Jane Austen.
