= Jean Duncan (artist) =

British artist (1933–2018)

- Born: 1933; Edinburgh, Scotland
- Died: 2018 (aged 84–85); York, England
- Education: Edinburgh College of Art; Moray House School of Education; Ulster Polytechnic
- Known for: Painting, printmaking
- Website: https://jeaniduncan.com/

Jean Duncan (1933 – 2 October 2018) was a British artist known as a painter, printmaker and video artist. Although born in Scotland, Duncan's career was largely based in Northern Ireland. She founded Seacourt Print Workshop in Bangor, County Down. She held a number of solo exhibitions in Belfast and Manchester, and also worked with composers Piers Hellawell and Deirdre McKay to produce images inspired by their music, for exhibitions or to accompany their musical performances. Duncan participated in the 2001 International Biennial in Portugal and the 2005 Tokyo International mini-print Triennial.

== Biography ==
Duncan was born in Edinburgh and, from 1951 to 1955, studied at the Edinburgh College of Art and then spent a year at the Moray House School of Education. Duncan settled in Belfast and, in 1980, took a post-graduate diploma in printmaking at the Ulster Polytechnic and then co-founded the Seacourt Print Workshop based in Bangor, County Down.

Duncan was elected a member of the Royal Ulster Academy in 1994 and was a member of the Artists' Association of Ireland. She had a number of solo exhibitions and gallery shows throughout her career. In 1986 her exhibition Sense and Symbols was held at the Octagon Gallery in Belfast, a solo show was held at One Oxford Street, Belfast in 1993 and her series of etchings inspired by John Tavener's The Protecting Veil was exhibited at the Royal Northern College of Music in Manchester during 1993.

Duncan also worked with the composers Piers Hellawell and Deirdre McKay to produce images inspired by their music, for exhibitions or to accompany their musical performances. Internationally, Duncan participated in the 2001 International Biennial in Portugal and the 2005 Tokyo International mini-print Triennial. Dundee Contemporary Arts, University College Dublin and the Arts Council of Northern Ireland hold examples of her work.
