= Richard Feld =

Richard Feld (also Atfeld; died 1401) was a Canon of Windsor from 1390 to 1401.

== Career ==
He was appointed:

- King's Almoner
- Rector of St Michael, Cornhill 1371 - 1393
- Rector of Bishop's Clyve, Worcester

He was appointed to the eleventh stall in St George's Chapel, Windsor Castle in 1390 and held the canonry until 1401.
