= Peter Renshaw =

https://www.gresham.ac.uk/speakers/professor-peter-renshawFile:Ambox+important.svgThis+biography+of+a+living+person+needs+additional+citations+for+verification.+Please+help+by+adding+reliable+sources.+Contentious+material+about+living+persons+that+is+unsourced+or+poorly+sourced+must+be+removed+immediately+from+the+article+and+its+talk+page,+especially+if+potentially+libelous.Find+sources: %22Peter+Renshaw%22 – news ·+newspapers ·+books ·+scholar ·+JSTOR++(February+2020)+(Learn+how+and+when+to+remove+this+message) Peter Renshaw (born 1936) is a British creative learning consultant and researcher with a special interest in institutional change and lifelong learning.

== Biography ==
Peter Renshaw was lecturer in Philosophy of Education at the University of Leeds Institute of Education (1970–75) and Principal of the Yehudi Menuhin School (1975–84). He became the Head of Research and Development at the Guildhall School of Music and Drama in 1984, a position which he held until his retirement in 2001. During his time at Guildhall, together with Peter Wiegold, Renshaw created a masters' programme in music performance and communication skills at the school, which is now known as the Masters in Leadership.

He was also the Gresham Professor of Music between 1986 and 1993, and a moderator for Sound Links, an EU Socrates project on cultural diversity in music education. In 2006, he became a mentor at the Practitioner Development Programme at The Sage Gateshead in North East England.

He is a board member of the Yehudi Mehuhin School and London International Festival of Theatre.

== Publications ==
- Renshaw, P. Management of Creativity in schools, colleges and arts organisations (1993)
- Renshaw, P and van den Linden, Jos. Dialogic Learning: Shifting Perspectives to Learning, Instruction, and Teaching (2004)
- Renshaw, P. Lifelong Learning for Musicians: The Place of Mentoring (2006)
- Renshaw, P. Engaged Passions: Searching for Quality in Community Contexts (2010)
- Renshaw, P. Working Together: An Enquiry into Creative Collaborative Learning Across the Barbican - Guildhall Campus (2011)
- Renshaw, P. Collaboration: Myth or Reality? Through the Eyes of the Barbican and Guildhall School (2017)
