= Theodore Aylward Sr. =

English organist

Theodore Aylward (1730 – 27 February, 1801) was an English composer and organist. Born in Chichester, he was the son of Henry Aylward. He may have sung as a boy at the Drury Lane Theatre in London. He was organist successively of Oxford Chapel, London (c1760-1768), St Lawrence Jewry (1762-88), St Michael, Cornhill (1768–1781), and (until his death) of St. George's Chapel, Windsor (1788–1801). As well as these appointments, he was the Gresham Professor of Music (1771–1801). Aylwood was also an assistant director at the Handel Commemoration of 1784. He was elected a member of the Royal Society of Musicians in 1763, and took the Oxford degree of DMus in 1791.

During his lifetime he composed musical dramas, songs, canzonets and glees. From around 1780 he directed the Friendly Harmonists, a glee club which met at Anderton's Coffee House in Fleet Street. He won a Catch Club medal in 1769. His Six Lessons for the Harpsichord, Organ or Piano Forte (c1784) were, according to John Harley, "virtually Handelian Suites". But Aylward's compositions also reflect his knowledge of the music of Domenico Scarlatti and J.C. Bach.

Having died in London on 27 February, 1801, Aylward was buried in St George's Chapel, leaving behind a family line of musicians. The composer is sometimes confused with his namesake and great-great nephew, Theodore Aylward Jr., sometime Organist & Master of the Choristers of Chichester Cathedral.

== Works ==
- Welcome sun and southern show'rs; a New Song (c1750)
- Ode on the Dawn of Peace (c1763)
- Six Songs in Harlequin's Invasion, Cymbeline, and Midsummer Night's Dream, (1765)
- Come nymphs and fauns, glee, (c1769)
- Six Lessons, for harpsichord, organ or piano, op.1 (c1784)
- Oft have I seen at early morn: a Favourite Sonnet (c1785)
- Eight Canzonets for two voices (c1790)
- Elegies and Glees, op.2 (c1790)
- Six Quartettos, 2 violins, viola, cello, op.4 (c1795)
- Morning Services, D, E♭
- Five anthems

== Notes ==
Cultural offices
Preceded by William Boyce	Organist of St Michael, Cornhill; 1769–1781	Succeeded by Richard John Samuel Stevens
