= St Michael, Cornhill =

Coordinates: 51°30′47.50″N 0°5′7.68″W

- Parish Church of Saint Michael upon Cornhill
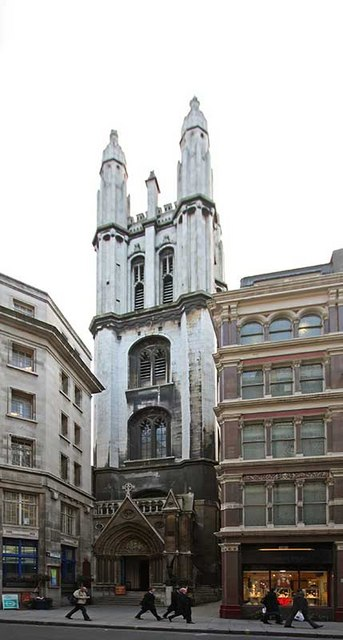
- View of church from Cornhill

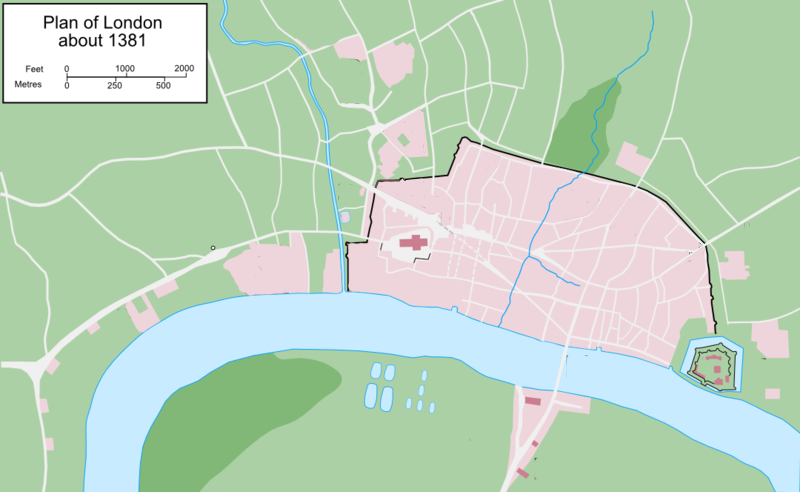
- Location within City of London Location within City of London in 1300
- Location: St Michael's Alley, City of London, EC3
- Country: England
- Language: English
- Denomination: Church of England
- Previous denomination: Roman Catholic (to 1536)
- Churchmanship: Book of Common Prayer
- Website: st-michaels.org.uk

History
- Founded: Before 1055
- Dedication: Saint Michael

Architecture
- Heritage designation: Grade I listed building
- Architect(s): Sir Christopher Wren, Nicholas Hawksmoor
- Style: Gothic Revival
- Years built: 1670

Administration
- Diocese: London
- Deanery: The City
- Parish: Michael upon Cornhill

Clergy
- Bishop: The Rt Revd Rod Thomas (AEO)
- Priest: The Revd Henry Eatock-Taylor

St Michael, Cornhill is a medieval parish church in the City of London with pre-Norman Conquest parochial foundation. It lies in the ward of Cornhill. The medieval structure was lost in the Great Fire of London, and replaced by the present building, traditionally attributed to Sir Christopher Wren. The upper parts of the tower are by Nicholas Hawksmoor. The church was embellished by Sir George Gilbert Scott and Herbert Williams in the nineteenth century.

== Early history ==
The church of St Michael, Cornhill is sited directly above the location of the western apse of the former Londinium Roman basilica (built c. AD 90–120). Although its walls are not aligned with the basilica, some of the church's foundations still sit directly on top of the Roman foundations.

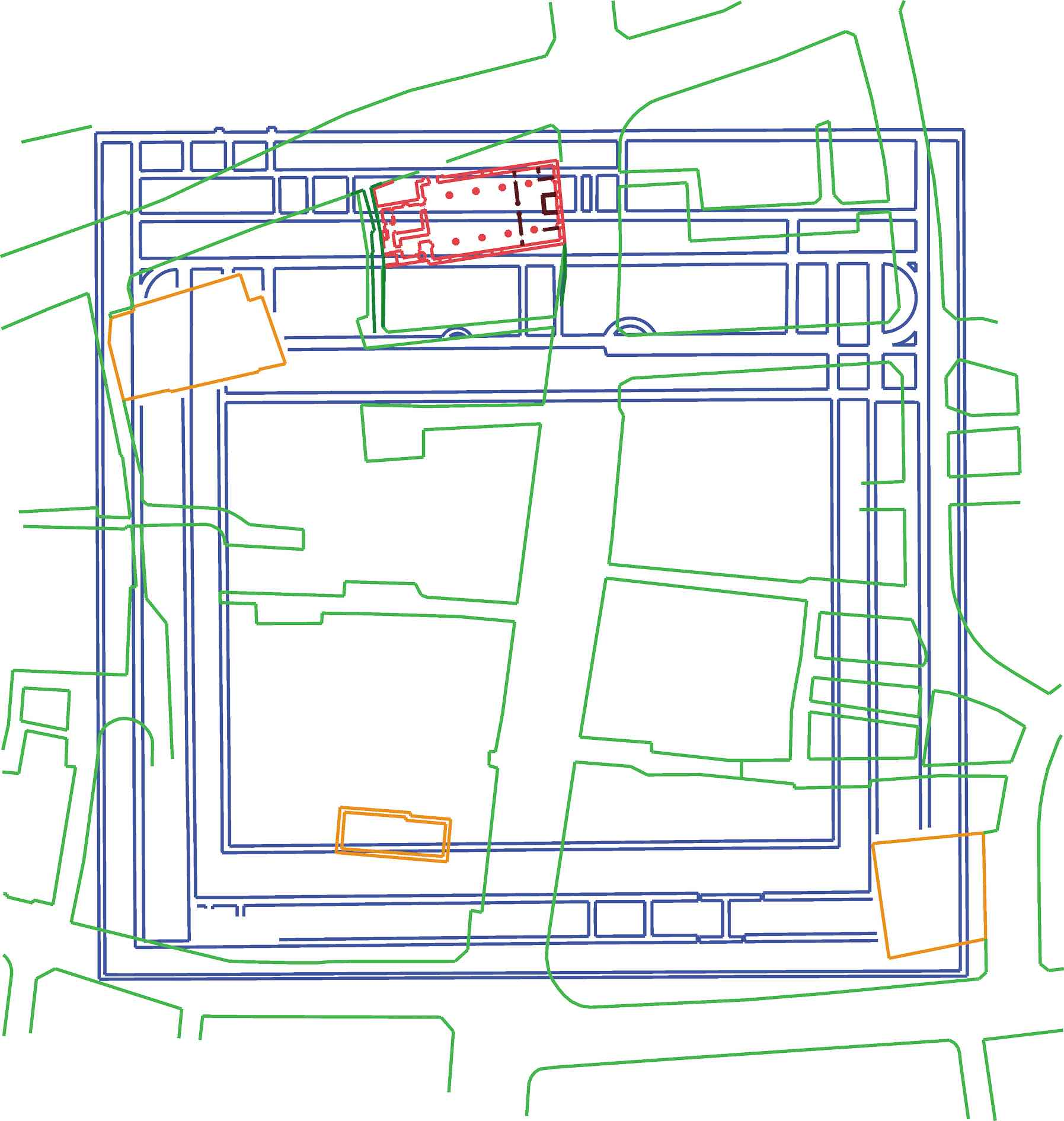
St Michael's Cornhill church (in orange, top left) and location above western end of London Roman Basilica

The first reference to the church was in 1055, when Alnod the priest gifted it to the Abbey of Evesham, "Alnod sacerdos dedit ecclesiam, beati Michaelis in Cornhulle, London".

The patronage remained in the possession of the Abbot and convent of Evesham until 1503, when it was settled on the Drapers' Company. A new tower was built in 1421, possibly after a fire. John Stow described the church as "fair and beautiful, but since the surrender of their lands to Edward VI, greatly blemished by the building of four tenements on the north side thereof, in the place of a green church-yard". On the south side of the church was a churchyard with what Stow calls a "proper cloister", with lodgings for choristers, and a pulpit cross, at which sermons were preached. These were maintained by Sir John Rudstone, after whose death in 1530 the choir was dissolved and the cross fell into decay. Churchwardens' accounts and other memoranda of the medieval and Tudor church are in print, and the parish registers from 1546 to 1754 are published by the Harleian Society.

A folk tale, dating from the early 16th century, tells of a team of bellringers who once saw 'an ugly shapen sight' appear as they were ringing the bells during a storm. They fell unconscious, but later discovered scratch marks in the masonry. For years afterward these were pointed out as the 'Devil's clawmarks'.

== Rebuilding after the Great Fire ==
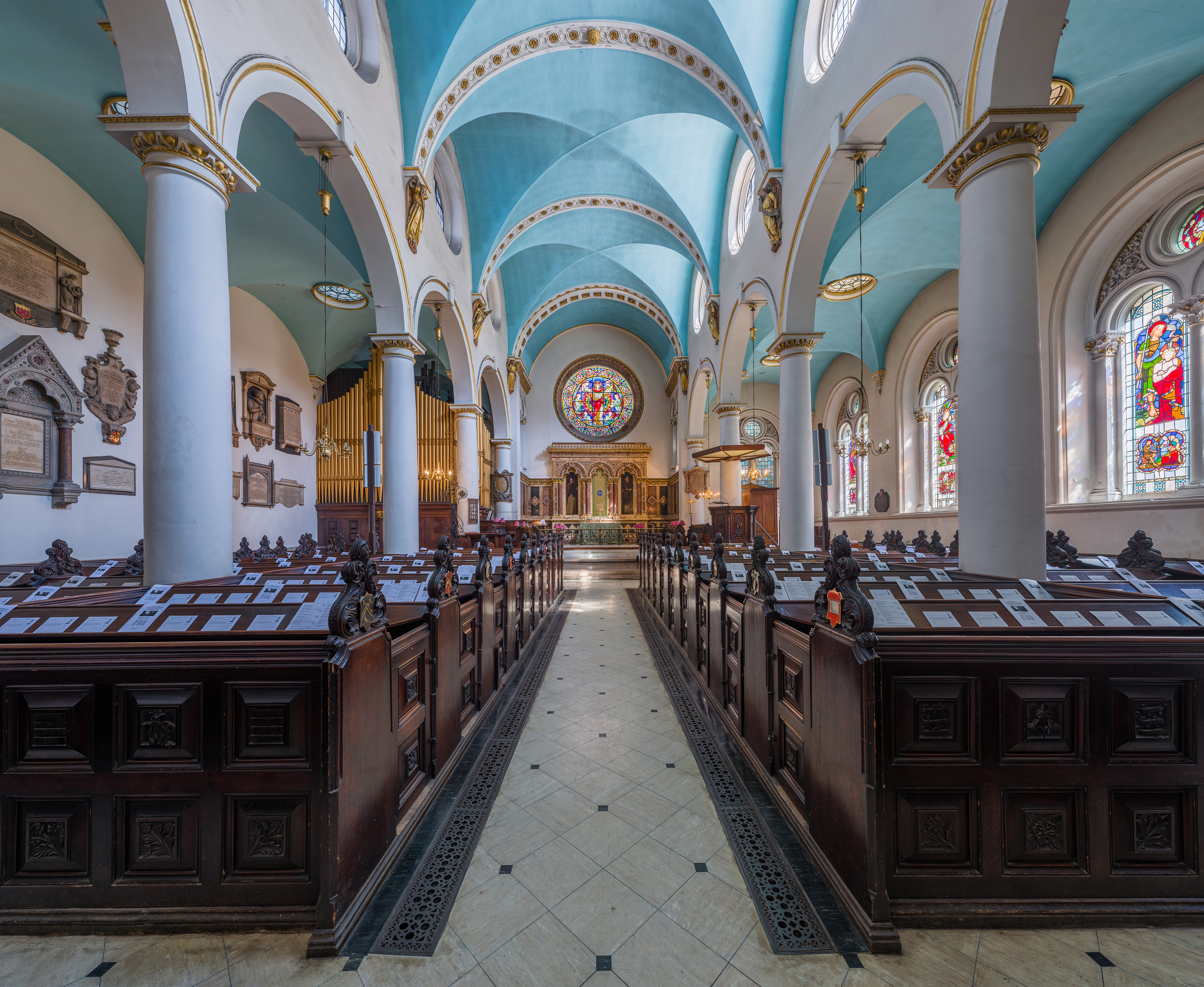
The interior from the entrance looking down the aisle

The medieval church, except for the tower, was destroyed in the Great Fire of London in 1666; the present building was begun in 1672. The design is traditionally attributed to Sir Christopher Wren. However, the authors of the Buildings of England guide to the City churches believe Wren's office had no involvement with the rebuilding of the body of the church, the parish having dealt directly with the builders. The new church was 83 feet long and 67 feet wide, divided into nave and aisles by Doric columns, with a groined ceiling. There was an organ at the west end, and a reredos with paintings of Moses and Aaron at the east. The walls, George Godwin noted, did not form right angles, indicating the re-use of the medieval foundations.

The fifteenth-century tower, having proved unstable, was demolished in 1704 by order of the archbishop. A replacement, 130 feet high, was completed in 1721. In contrast to the main body of the church it was built in a Gothic style, in imitation of that of Magdalen College, Oxford. Construction had begun in 1715, with money from the coal fund. The designer of the lower stages was probably William Dickinson, working in Christopher Wren's office. Funds proved inadequate, and work stopped in 1717 with the tower half-completed. The tower was eventually completed in 1722 with the aid of a grant from the Commission for Building Fifty New Churches, the upper stages being to the designs of its surveyor, Nicholas Hawksmoor. The tower terminates in four elaborately panelled turrets, resembling those of King's College Chapel, Cambridge.

Repairs were made to the church in 1751, 1775, and 1790, the last two of which were done under the survey of George Wyatt. In the 1790 repairs, the south aisle windows and the east window were made circular; as well, a new pulpit, desk, altar rail, east window glass, and 12 new brass branches were added.

== Victorian alterations ==
In the late 1850s, the Drapers' Company, motivated by legislation that would have forced them to hand certain funds over to the Ecclesiastical Commissioners if they were not spent on St Michael's, decided to fund a lavish scheme of embellishment, and asked George Gilbert Scott to carry out the work.

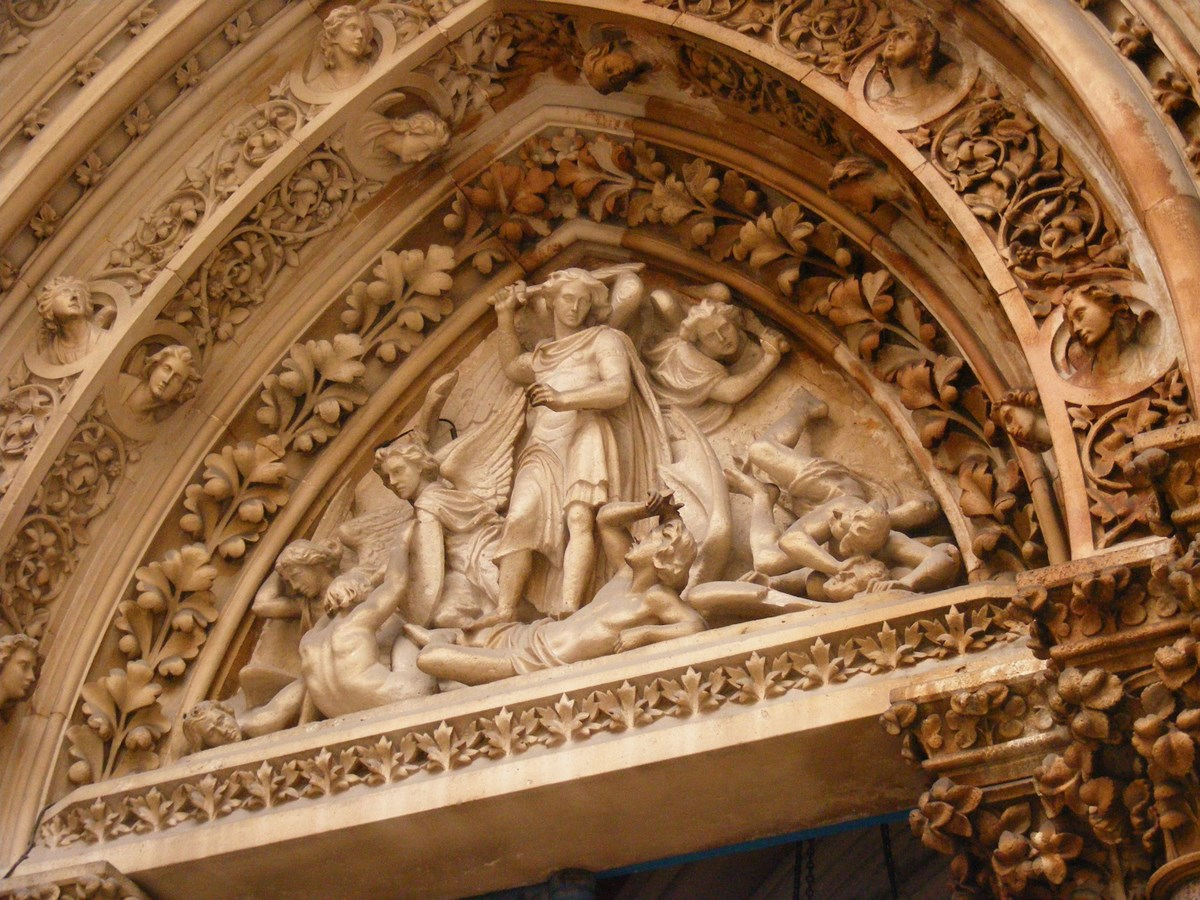
J. B. Philip's tympanum sculpture St Michael disputing with Satan

Scott demolished a house that had stood against the tower, replacing it with an elaborate porch, built in the "Franco-Italian Gothic" style (1858–1860), facing towards Cornhill. It is decorated with carving by John Birnie Philip, including a high-relief tympanum sculpture depicting "St Michael disputing with Satan". Scott inserted Gothic tracery into the circular clerestory windows, and into the plain round-headed windows on the south side of the church. New side windows were created in the chancel, and an elaborate stone reredos, incorporating the paintings of Moses and Aaron by Robert Streater from its predecessor, was constructed in an Italian Gothic style. A contemporary account of the work explained that this was appropriate since "the classical feeling which pervades the Italian school of Gothic art enabled the architect to bring the classical features of the building into harmony with the Gothic treatment which our present sympathies demand". The chancel walls were lined with panels of coloured marble, up to the level of the top of the reredos columns, and richly painted above this point. It was said that Scott "proposes to brighten all the roof with colour... and he fuses the vaulting into something transitional between Pointed and Italian. And he inserts tracery in all the round-headed windows, and the great ugly stable-like circles of the clerestory become roses under his plastic hand."

Stained glass by Clayton and Bell was installed, with a representation of Christ in Glory in the large circular east window. Its splays were enriched with inlaid and carved marble, with four heads in high relief enclosed in medallions. The other windows contained a series of stained glass images illustrating the life of Christ, with the crucifixion at the west end.

The pews also date from this time, and are an impressive complete set of victorian church furnishings, with elaborately carved finials at the bench ends, each with a different design. They were executed by a certain Mr Rogers to the designs of Gilbert Scott, and represent a rare survival of a complete set of Gilbert-Scott church furnishings, his other great set at Bath Abbey being removed and dispersed in the latest renovations. They were described in The Building News in 1861 as being of "oak of beautiful colour and texture, effectively rendered by the veteran Rogers, who is one of the most successful imitators of the renowned Grinling Gibbons. Gilbert Scott and Rogers are also responsible for the fine hexagonal pulpit, as well as the highly embellished royal pew. The church also has special pews called the Diocesan and Corporation pews, as well as the pew of the Worshipful Company of Drapers, which is the patron of the church.

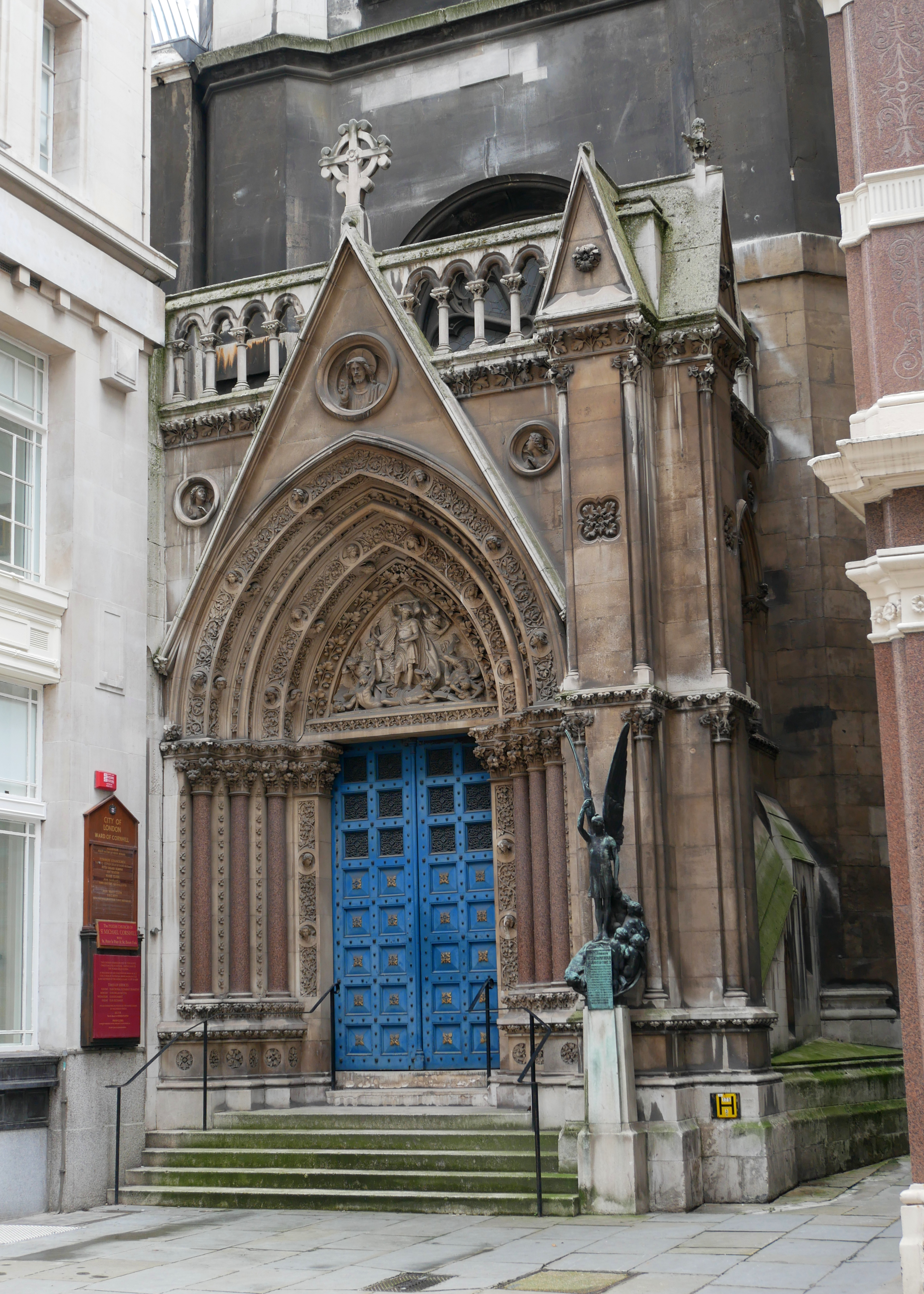
Entrance to St Michael, Cornhill, with war memorial to the right

A further campaign of medievalising decoration was carried out in the late 1860s by Herbert Williams, who had worked with Scott on the earlier scheme. Williams built a three-bay cloister-like passage, with plaster vaults, on the south side of the building, and in the body of the church added richly painted decoration to Wren's columns and capitals. The reredos was enriched with inlaid marble, and the chancel was given new white marble steps and a mosaic floor of Minton's tesserae and tiles. In what the Building News described as a "startling novelty", a circular opening was cut in the vault of each aisle bay and filled with stained glass, and skylights installed above.

Few original furnishings were retained in its Victorian re-imagining, but the 1672 font given by James Paul survived, although a new balustrade was added.

== Recent history ==
A First World War memorial was unveiled beside the entrance to the church in 1920, featuring a bronze statue of St Michael by Richard Reginald Goulden. The memorial became a Grade II* listed building in December 2016.

The church escaped serious damage during the Second World War, and was designated a Grade I listed building on 4 January 1950. In 1960, the Victorian polychrome paintwork was replaced with a more restrained colour scheme of blue, gold and white.

A new ring of twelve bells, cast by Taylors of Loughborough, was installed in the tower in April 2011.

The church has one of the oldest sets of churchwarden's records in the City of London, which are now kept in the Guildhall Library.

The Book of Common Prayer, the King James Bible and the English Hymnal continue to be used in services. The church is a corporate member of the Prayer Book Society.

The church vestry hosts the annual ward mote and polling station for the City of London ward of Cornhill.

In 2016, the parish was forced to dissolve its parochial church council due to insolvency, and services were halted. The Sunday services were replaced by weekday choral evensong - which continues to features the robed choir and organ.

As a traditionalist parish that rejects the ordination/leadership of women, the church receives alternative episcopal oversight from the Bishop of Ebbsfleet.

== Rectors ==
- Sperling the Priest, 1133
- John de Merham, 1287
- William de Wyholakesford, 1321–1322
- Henry de Makeseye, 1330–1331
- John de Wendland, ????–1345
- Thomas de Wallingford 1345
- Richard Savage, 1351–1357/8
- Hugh de Denton, 1366–1368
- Richard Mitford, ????–1371
- Richard Atfelde, 1371–1393
- John Haseley, 1393–1400
- Thomas Whithede, 1400–1407
- William Bright, 1407–1414
- Peter Heynewick, 1421–1426
- Henry Woodchurch, 1426–1432
- Thomas Lisieux, 1432–1447
- William Lyeff, 1447–1454
- William Wytham, 1454
- Thomas Bolton, 1472–1474
- Henry Best, 1474–1477
- Peter Hussye, 1477–1482
- Martin Joynour, 1482–1485
- John Moore, 1485–1503
- John Wardroper, 1503–1515
- Peter Drayton, 1515–1517
- Rowland Phillips, 1517–1538
- Edward Stepham, 1538–1545
- John Willoughby, 1545–1554
- John Philpot, 1562/3–1567
- Richard Mathew, 1567–1587
- William Ashbold, 1587–1622
- George Carew, 1622–1624/5
- William Brough, 1625–1642
- Thomas Holl, 1642/3–1645
- Anthony Harford, 1645–1646
- John Wall, 1646–1652
- Peter Vincke, 1652–1660
- William Brough, 1660–1664
- John Meriton, 1664–1704
- Samuel Baker, 1705–1749
- Arnold King, 1749–1771
- Robert Poole Finch, 1771–1784
- Arthur Dawes, 1784–1793
- Thomas Robert Wrench, 1793–1836
- Thomas William Wrench, 1836–1875
- William Hunt, 1875–1887
- Alfred Earle, 1888–1896
- George Charles Bell, 1896–1913
- John Henry Joshua Ellison, 1913–1945
- George Frederick Saywell, 1945–1956
- Norman Charles Stanley Motley, 1956–1980
- John Scott, 1981–1985
- David Burton Evans, 1986–1996
- Gordon Reid, 1997–1998
- Peter Mullen, 1998–2012
- Stephen Platten, 2014–2017
- Charles Skrine, 2017–2021
- Henry Eatock-Taylor, 2022-

The patrons of the living are (and have been since 1503) the Worshipful Company of Drapers.

== Notable parishioners ==
- John Stow, author of A Survey of London (1598)
- Thomas Gray, the poet famous for his Elegy Written in a Country Churchyard, was born in a milliner's shop adjacent to St Michael's in 1716, and was baptised in the church.
- Martin Neary, later organist of Westminster Abbey, was baptised in St Michael's.
- Sir George Thalben-Ball, leading organist and choir director.
- Sir Derek Pattinson, former general secretary to the General Synod of the Church of England.
- Fay Weldon, a feminist writer, was a member of the congregation for some years.
- Douglas Murray, media personality.

== Organ ==
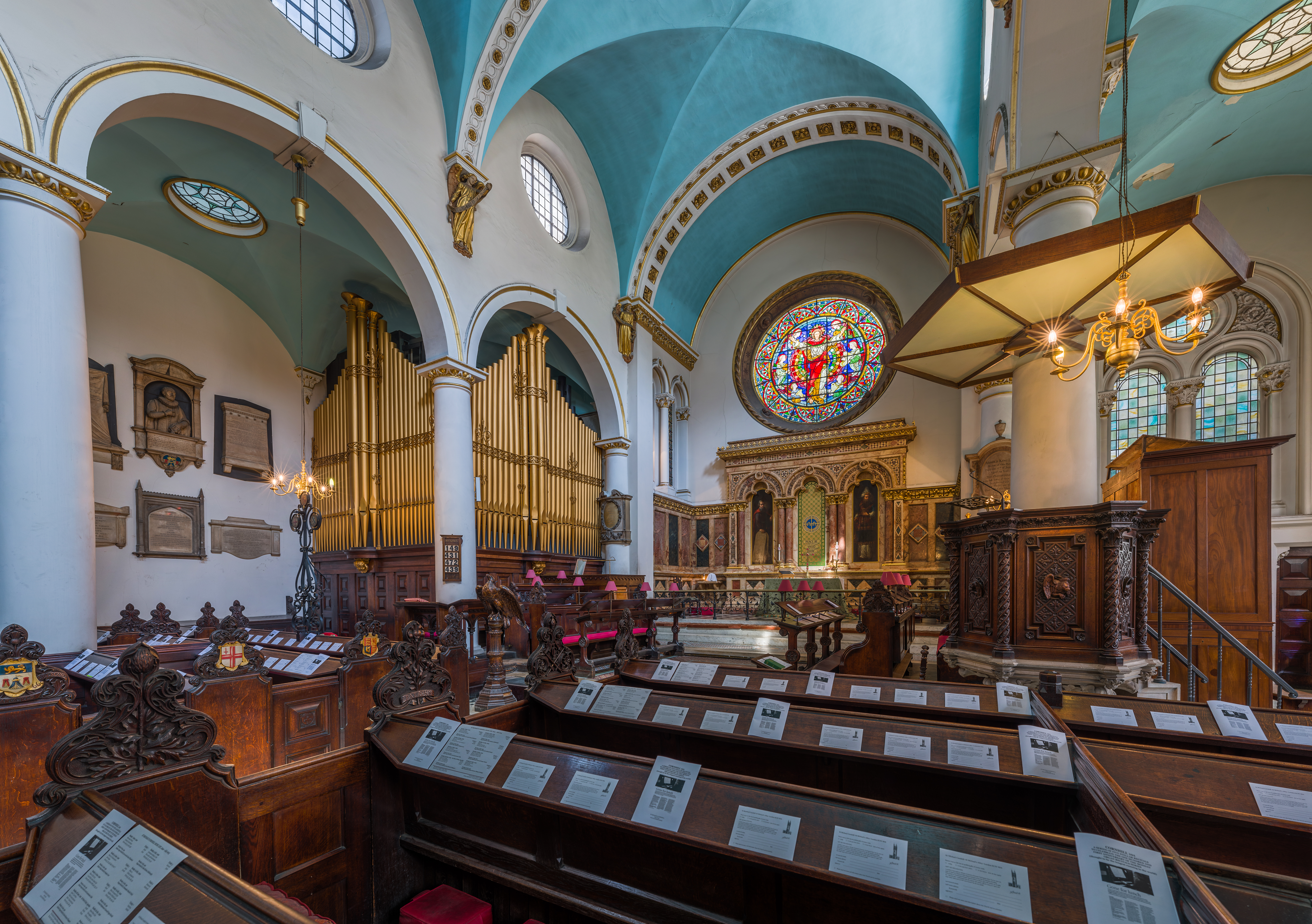
Interior showing the organ and skylights cut in the aisle vaults in the late 1860s

The organ, which includes historic pipework by Renatus Harris, Green, Robson, Bryceson, Hill and Rushworth and Dreaper, and was in 2010 restored by Nicholson & Co (Worcester) Ltd, has been awarded a Historic Organ Certificate of Recognition by the British Institute of Organ Studies.

=== List of organists ===
- Isaac Blackwell, 1684–1699
- Walter Holt, 1699–1704
- Philip Hart, 1704–1723
- Obadiah Shuttleworth, 1723–1734
- Joseph Kelway, 1734–1736 (afterward, organist of St Martin-in-the-Fields)
- William Boyce, 1736–1768 (also appointed Master of the King's Musick in 1755 and organist at the Chapel Royal in 1758)
- Theodore Aylward Sr., 1769–1781 (Gresham Professor of Music 1771, and organist of St. George's Chapel, Windsor 1788)
- Richard John Samuel Stevens, 1781–1810
- George William Arnull, 1810–1849
- Richard Davidge Limpus, 1849–1875
- Edward Henry Thorne, 1875–1891
- Williamson John Reynolds, 1891–1900 (afterward, organist of St Martin in the Bull Ring, Birmingham)
- George Frederick Vincent, 1900–1916
- Harold Darke, 1916–1966
- Richard Popplewell, 1966–1979
- Jonathan Rennert, 1979–current

== See also ==
- List of churches and cathedrals of London
- List of Christopher Wren churches in London
