= Robert Finch (priest) =

English divine (1724-1803)

Robert Poole Finch (1724-1803) was an English divine.

== Life ==
Finch was the son of the Rev. Richard Finch. He was born at Greenwich 3 March 1723–4, entered Merchant Taylors' School in 1736, and was admitted a member of Peterhouse, Cambridge, whence he graduated B.A. in 1743, M.A. in 1747 and D.D. in 1772. He was ordained as a deacon in 1744, and appointed a curate at Greenwich in 1748. On becoming a priest he was chosen to be chaplain of Guy's Hospital, a position he held for 37 years. In 1755 he was appointed to the lectureship of St Bartholomew-by-the-Exchange, which he continued to hold to the time of his death.

He was a preacher of some eminence. He published numerous sermons, and, in 1788, a treatise entitled Considerations upon the Use and Abuse of Oaths judicially taken, which passed through many editions and became a standard work among the publications of the Society for Promoting Christian Knowledge. In it he insisted that oaths should be administered with solemnity, condemned common swearing, and advocated the death sentence for the crime of perjury.

In 1771 he was appointed rector of St. Michael's, Cornhill, but resigned in 1784, on becoming rector of St. John the Evangelist, Westminster. Between 1775 and 1802 he was one of the four treasurers of the Society for Promoting Christian Knowledge. In 1781 he was made prebendary of Westminster, and retaining this appointment until his death, 18 May 1803, was buried in the abbey.
