= R. J. S. Stevens =

English composer and organist

Richard John Samuel Stevens (27 March 1757 – 23 September 1837) was an English composer and organist. He composed some highly regarded English glees, and wrote a number of volumes of recollections, diaries and other literary material that provides valuable background on the musical life of late 18th century and early 19th century England. He bridges the gap between old Handel and Queen Victoria.

== Biography ==
Stevens was born at Little Bell Alley, just off Coleman Street in London, and was apprenticed to William Savage, Master of the Boys at St Paul's Cathedral until his voice broke in 1773. He took up various organ and technig jobs until his first official appointment, as organist of St Michael's Cornhill in May 1781. In 1786 he succeeded John Stanley as organist at Temple Church, and in 1796 succeeded John Jones as organist of Charterhouse. Many of these positions were held simultaneously.

In 1801, he was appointed Gresham Professor of Music. In 1808 he received yet another appointment, as music master at Christ's Hospital. Besides being valuable in themselves, these appointments helped him to attract the wealthy pupils on whom his living substantially depended.

In 1810 Stevens married Anna Jeffery, after a long courtship; in 1811 they had a son, Richard George, who entered Gray's Inn in 1834. He embarked on the life of a gentleman of leisure, made possible by a substantial bequest from one of his father’s friends in 1817. He died, aged 80, at his wife's old home at Peckham, and was buried in the cloisters at London Charterhouse.

Stevens's chief claim to attention is as a composer of glees. He was not prolific, considering the length of his life; the bulk of his composing was done between 1780 and 1800. Stevens was more careful than many contemporaries in his choice of texts, and devoted special attention to Shakespeare. Of his 15 Shakespearean glees, composed between 1782 and 1807, five are among his best-known pieces: "Ye spotted snakes" (1782, rev. 1791), "Sigh no more, ladies" (1787), "Crabbed age and youth" (1790), "Blow, blow, thou winter wind" (1793) and "The cloud-cap't towers"(1795).

Among Stevens’s compositions that did not outlive him were some anthems, including several for Christ's Hospital; three keyboard sonatas; an opera entitled Emma; and a few songs and hymn tunes. Stevens was a professional member of the Anacreontic Society and it is through his journal accounts that we know that John Stafford Smith wrote their club song "The Anacreontic Song", which, considerably altered and with new words, is now the national anthem of the USA, "The Star-Spangled Banner".

His writings are housed in the Pendlebury Library of Music, Cambridge, and his manuscripts in the nearby Fitzwilliam Museum, bequeathed by Professor J B Trend, a descendant of the family.

Cultural offices
Preceded by Theodore Aylward, Sr.	Organist of St Michael, Cornhill; 1781-1810	Succeeded by George William Arnull
Preceded by John Stanley	Organist of Temple Church; 1786-1810	Succeeded by George Price
Preceded by John Jones	Organist of Charterhouse London; 1796-1837	Succeeded by William Horsley
Preceded by Theodore Aylward, Sr.	Gresham Professor of Music; 1801-1837	Succeeded by Edward Taylor
Preceded by Robert Hudson	Organist of Christ's Hospital; 1808-1810	Succeeded by Robert Glenn

== See also ==
- Argent, Mark (ed.). Recollections of R.J.S. Stevens: an organist in Georgian London. London: Macmillan, 1992. 314 p.
