= Abiell Whichello =

English composer and organist (1683–1747)

Abiell Whichello (sometimes given as Abel Wichelow or Wichello) (born 1 March 1683 – buried 16 August 1747, London) was an English composer and organist. He was the organist at St Edmund, King and Martyr from 1712 to 1747. He frequently attended Thomas Britton's concerts and was a founding member of the Royal Society of Musicians. His compositions included works for organ, harpsichord, and voice.
