= William Crotch =

British composer and organist (1755-1847)

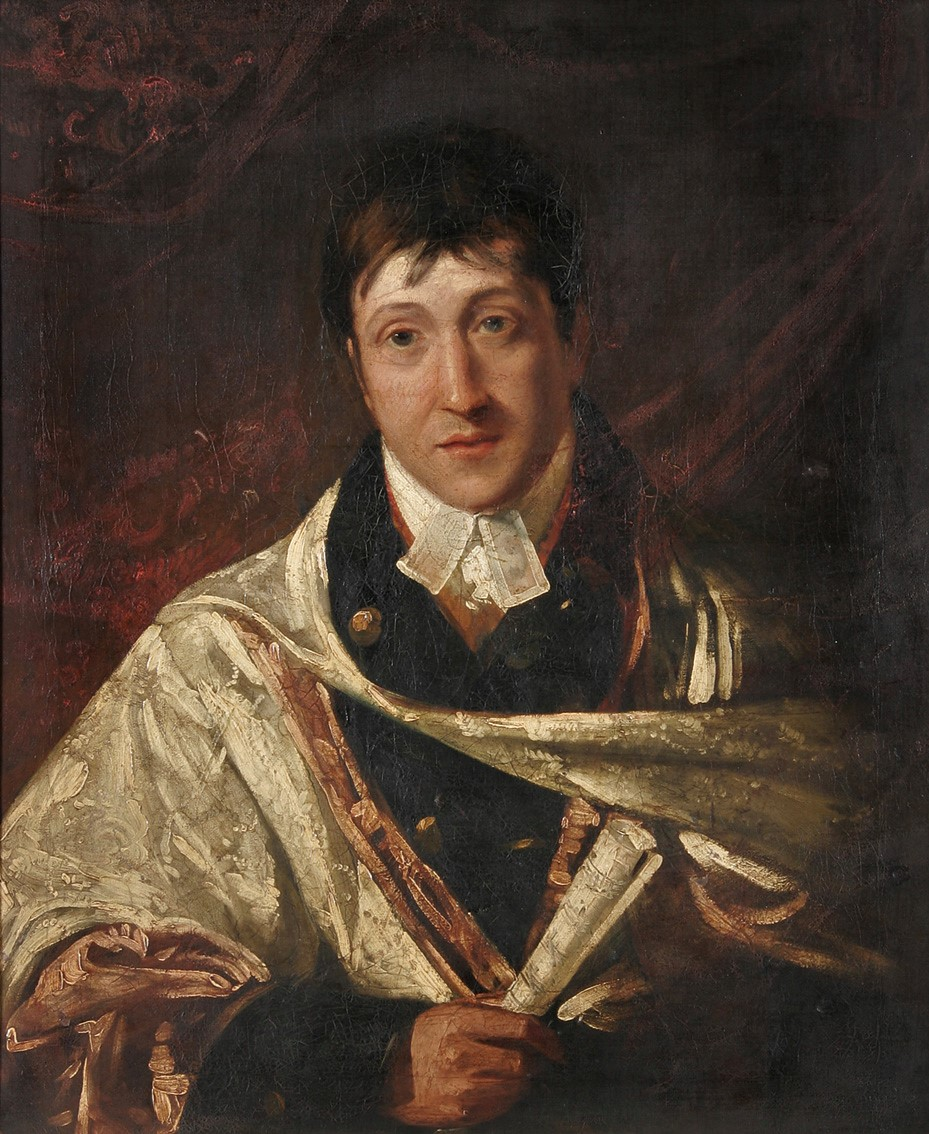

Background information
- Born: 5 July 1775
- Died: 29 December 1847 (aged 72)
- Occupations: Composer & Organist

William Crotch (5 July 1775 – 29 December 1847) was an English composer and organist. According to the British musicologist Nicholas Temperley, Crotch was "a child prodigy without parallel in the history of music", and was certainly the most distinguished English musician in his day.

== Life ==
=== Childhood ===
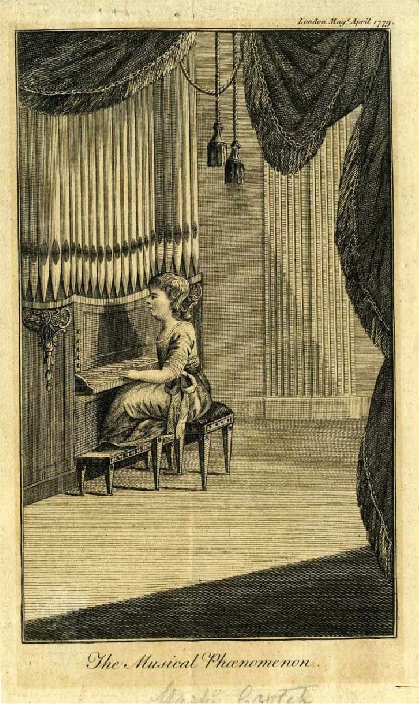
William Crotch playing the organ, aged 3½, in an illustration from The London Magazine, April 1779

William Crotch was born in Norwich, Norfolk, to a master carpenter. Like Mozart, he was a child prodigy, playing the organ his father had built. At the age of two he became a local celebrity by performing for visitors, among them the musician Charles Burney, who wrote an account of his visits for the Royal Society. The three-year-old Crotch was taken to London by his ambitious mother, where he not only played on the organ of the Chapel Royal in St James's Palace, but performed for King George III. The London Magazine of April 1779 recorded:

He appears to be fondest of solemn tunes and church musick, particularly the 104th Psalm. As soon as he has finished a regular tune, or part of a tune, or played some little fancy notes of his own, he stops, and has some of the pranks of a wanton boy; some of the company then generally give him a cake, an apple, or an orange, to induce him to play again...

Crotch was later to observe that this experience led him to become a rather spoiled child, excessively indulged so that he would perform.

=== Adult life ===
Crotch was for a time organist at Christ Church, Oxford, from which he was later to graduate with a Bachelor of Music degree. His first attempt at an oratorio, The Captivity of Judah, was played at Trinity Hall, Cambridge on 4 June 1789 when he was 14. His most successful—and largest scale—composition was the oratorio Palestine (1812), after which he mainly returned to smaller scale works. He may have composed the Westminster Chimes in 1793, which are played by Big Ben each time it strikes the hour.

In 1797, Crotch became Heather Professor of Music at Oxford University, and in 1799 he acquired a doctorate in music. While at Oxford, he became acquainted with the musician and artist John Malchair, and took up sketching. He followed Malchair's style in recording the exact time and date of each of his pictures, and when he met the artist John Constable in London in 1805, he passed the habit along to the more famous artist.

He was the first principal of the Royal Academy of Music, serving for ten years from 1822. Among his notable pupils were William Sterndale Bennett, Lucy Anderson, Stephen Codman, George Job Elvey, Cipriani Potter, and Charles Kensington Salaman. In 1834, to commemorate the installation of the Duke of Wellington as chancellor of the University of Oxford. Crotch composed his oratorio The Captivity of Judah. This 1834 work bears little resemblance to the oratorio of the same title he wrote as a child, in 1789. It was set to the same text as the earlier version, but is otherwise completely different. It received two complete performances during the composer's lifetime and was never published.

Crotch spent his last years at his son's house in Taunton, Somerset, where he died in 1847. He was buried in the churchyard of St Peter and St Paul in Bishop's Hull, just outside Taunton.

Two grandsons of William Crotch became eminent entomologists: George Robert Crotch and his brother William Duppa Crotch.

== Selected compositions ==
- Captivity of Judah (1789), oratorio.
- Three piano sonatas, published on subscription in 1793.
- Overture in A (1795), the first of three orchestral "sinfonias". No 2 in Eb was composed in 1808 and revised in 1817; No 3 in F was composed in 1814-15.
- Ten Anthems (1798, revised 1804). Among them are 'Sing we merrily', 'How Dear are Thy Counsels', 'Oh Lord God of hosts', and 'Be merciful unto me'.
- Ode to Fancy (1799, text Joseph Wharton), for two four-part choruses, three soloists and small orchestra, written as an exercise for his Mus.Doc degree.
- Three organ concertos (circa 1804), played often in concerts during Crotch's time in Oxford. In a similar style to near-contemporary organ concertos by Charles Wesley, Samuel Wesley and William Felton, all influenced by Handel.
- 12 Fugues, the subjects taken from chants (1835-7) for organ or piano (this instruction presumably written in an effort to increase sales)
- Palestine, oratorio (1812), text Reginald Heber. First performed at the Hanover Square Rooms on 21 April 1812 and repeated due to popular demand on 26 May. Two and a half hours of music, by far his most popular work, and typically judged his best. The Epiphany anthem 'Lo! star-led chiefs' still receives independent performances and recordings today.
- Symphony in F major (1814)
- Symphony in Eb (1817, unfinished)
- Ode on the King's Accession (1820) for chorus and orchestra. George IV became king in January 1820. First performed in Oxford, 1821.
- The Joy of our Heart is Ceased (1827), choral anthem, written on the death of the Duke of York.
- Captivity of Judah (1834), oratorio.
- The Lord is King (1838), choral anthem, his last large-scale work, first performed in 1843.

== Sources ==
- Burney, Charles (1779). "Account of an Infant Musician". Philosophical Transactions of the Royal Society of London. 69 (1779): 183–206. doi:10.1098/rstl.1779.0018. JSTOR 106418.
- Rennert, Jonathan (1975). "William Crotch, 1775–1847: Composer, Artist, Teacher". The Musical Times. 116 (1589): 622–623. doi:10.2307/960437. ISSN 2397-5318. JSTOR 960437.
