= Concert =

Live performance of music in front of an audience

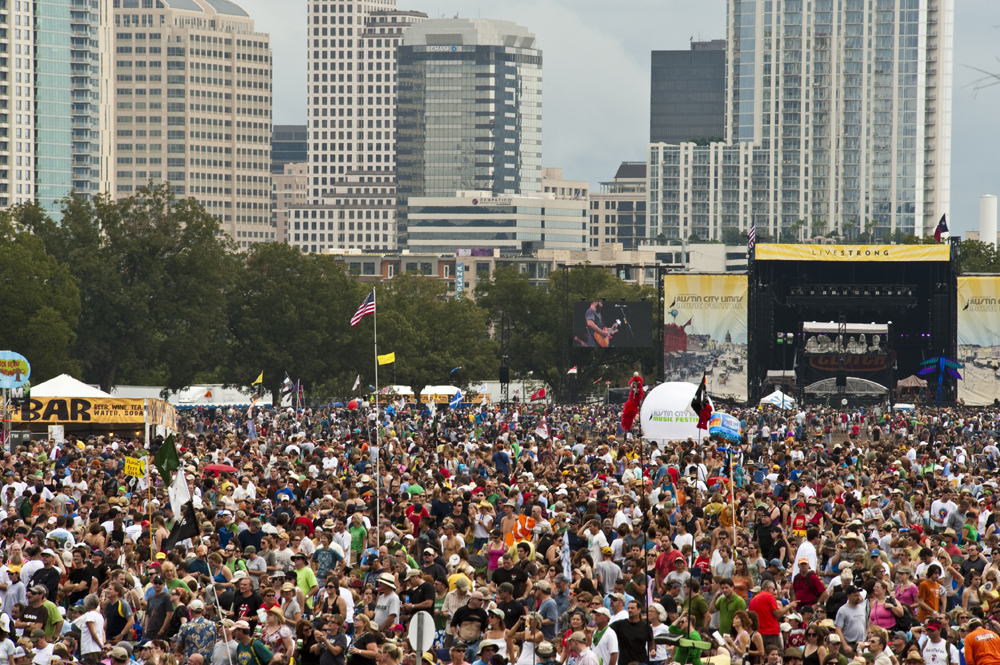
A show at the Austin City Limits Music Festival in 2009. Austin, Texas has been referred to as the "Live Music Capital of the World", particularly for country music in the United States.

A concert, known informally as a gig or show, is a live performance of music in front of an audience. The performance may be carried by a single musician, in which case it is sometimes called a recital, or by a musical ensemble such as an orchestra, choir, or band. Concerts are held in a wide variety of settings and sizes, spanning from venues such as private houses and small nightclubs to mid-sized concert halls and finally to large arenas and stadiums, as well as outdoor venues such as amphitheatres and parks. Indoor concerts held in the largest venues are sometimes called arena concerts or amphitheatre concerts.

Regardless of the venue, musicians usually perform on a stage (if not an actual stage, then an area of the floor designated as such). Concerts often require live event support with professional audio equipment. Before recorded music, concerts provided the main opportunity to hear musicians play. For large concerts or concert tours, the challenging logistics of arranging the musicians, venue, equipment, audience, and tickets are handled by professional tour promoters.

== History ==
While the first concerts did not officially appear until the late 17th century, similar gatherings had been around throughout the early 17th century at several European universities, such as Oxford and Cambridge. Officially, though, the first public concerts that required an admission were created by the English violinist John Banister. Over the next few centuries, concerts began to gain larger audiences, and classical symphonies were very popular. Finally, after World War 2, these events changed into the modern concerts that take place today. An example of an early, post-WW2 concert is the Moondog Coronation Ball.

=== 17th century ===
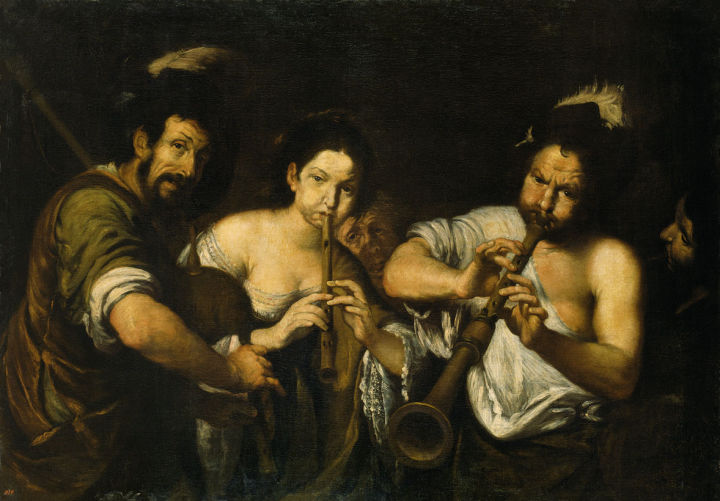
Concert, by Italian baroque artist Bernardo Strozzi, c. 1630–1631

The first known occurrence of concerts where people are charged admission took place at violinist John Banister's home in Whitefriars, London in 1672. 6 years later in 1678, a man by the name of Thomas Britton held weekly concerts in Clerkenwell. However, these concerts were different. Before, there was an admission that people paid upon entering the building where the concert was held, but at Britton's concerts, patrons purchased a yearly subscription to come to the concerts. At 10 shillings a year, people could see as many concerts they wanted to.

In addition to holding concerts at certain venues, concerts also went to the people. In 17th century France, concerts were performed in the homes of the nobility, for only the nobility. Organized by Anne Danican Philidor, the first public concerts in France, and arguably the world, were the Concerts Spirituels. These concerts were held on religious holidays when the Opera was closed and served as a model for concert societies all over the world.

=== 18th century ===
In the late 18th century, music from the likes of Haydn and Mozart was brought and performed in English concerts. One notable work from Haydn performed at these concerts was his set of 12 symphonies, also referred to as the London Symphonies. Concerts reflecting the elegance of England during the time period were held at the gardens of Vauxhall, Ranelagh, and Marylebone. The musical repertoire performed at these events ranged from works composed by young Mozart, to songs that were popular in that time period.

== Types ==
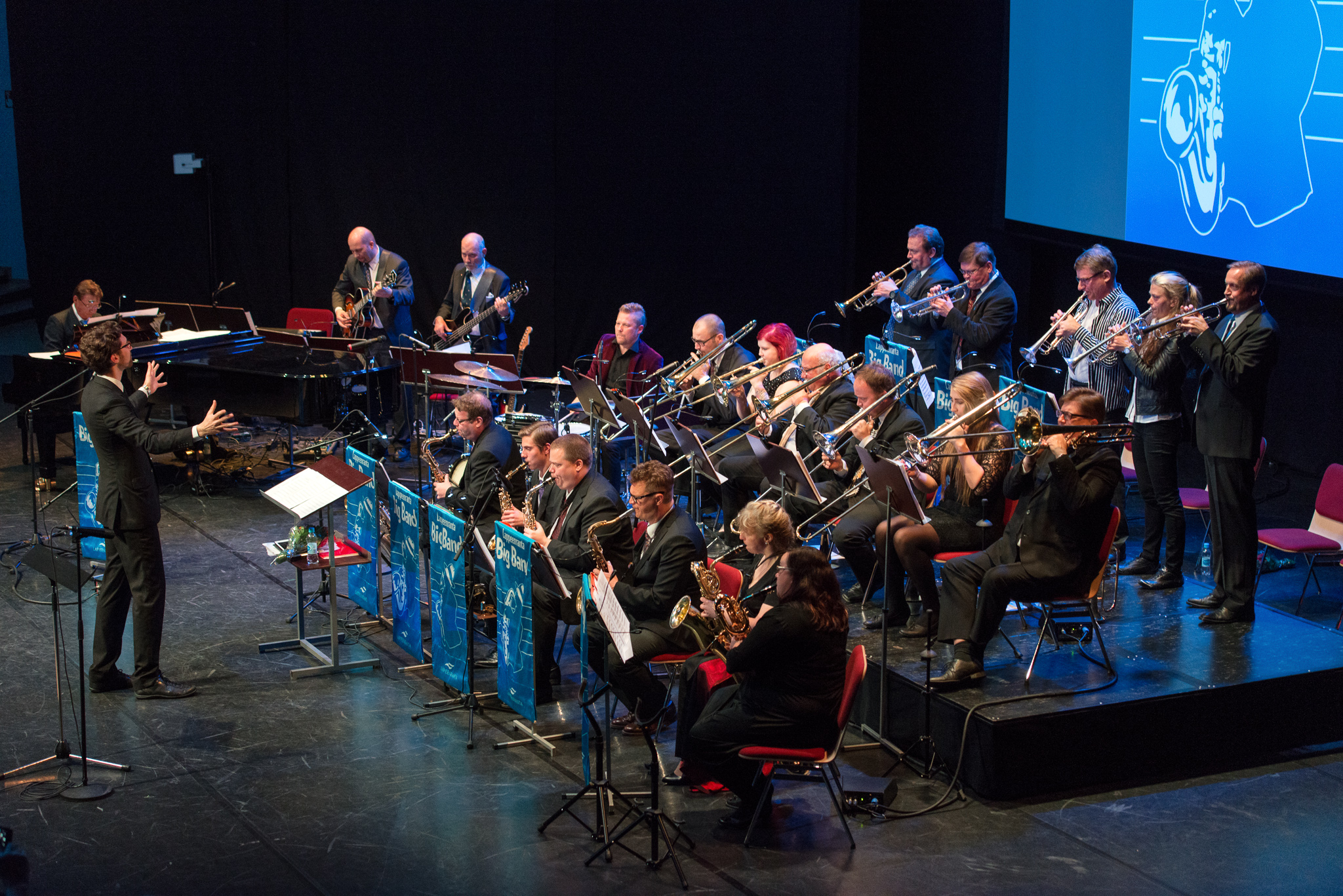
A big band concert in Lappeenranta, Finland

The nature of a concert varies by musical genre, individual performers, and the venue. Concerts by a small jazz combo or small bluegrass band may have the same order of program, mood, and volume—but vary in music and dress. In a similar way, a particular musician, band, or genre of music might attract concert attendees with similar dress, hairstyle, and behavior. In the 1960s, rock concerts became associated with countercultural fashion and attitudes, often linked to the hippie movement.

=== Recital ===
A recital is a solo concerto, i.e. a concert by a soloist or small group which follows a program. It can highlight a single performer, sometimes accompanied by piano, or a performance of the works of a single composer, or a single instrument (organ recital). The invention of the solo piano recital has been attributed to Franz Liszt. Also, a recital may have many participants, as for a dance recital. A dance recital is a presentation of choreographed moves for an audience, usually in an established performing arts venue, possibly competitively. Some dance recitals are seasonal.

=== Theatrical ===
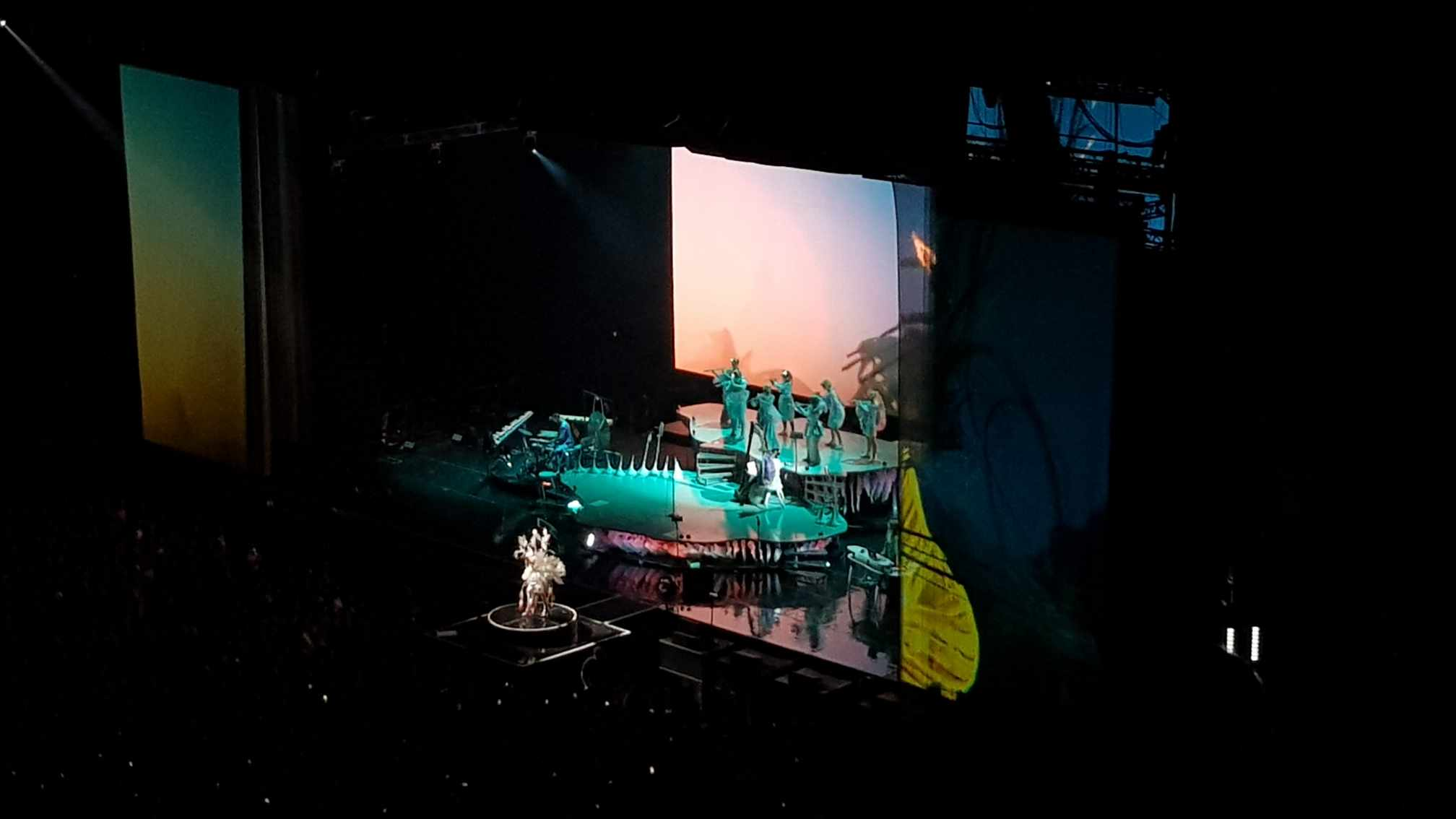
A theatrical concert in Paris in 2023

Some performers or groups put on very elaborate and expensive shows. To create a memorable and exciting atmosphere and increase the spectacle, performers frequently include additional entertainment devices. These can include elaborate stage lighting, electronic imagery via (IMAG) system and/or pre-recorded video, inflatable sets, artwork or other set pieces, various special effects such as theatrical smoke and fog and pyrotechnics, and unusual costumes or wardrobe. Some singers, especially popular music, augment concert sound with pre-recorded accompaniment, back-up dancers, and even broadcast vocal tracks of the singer's own voice. Activities during these concerts can include dancing, sing-alongs, and moshing.

=== Classical ===
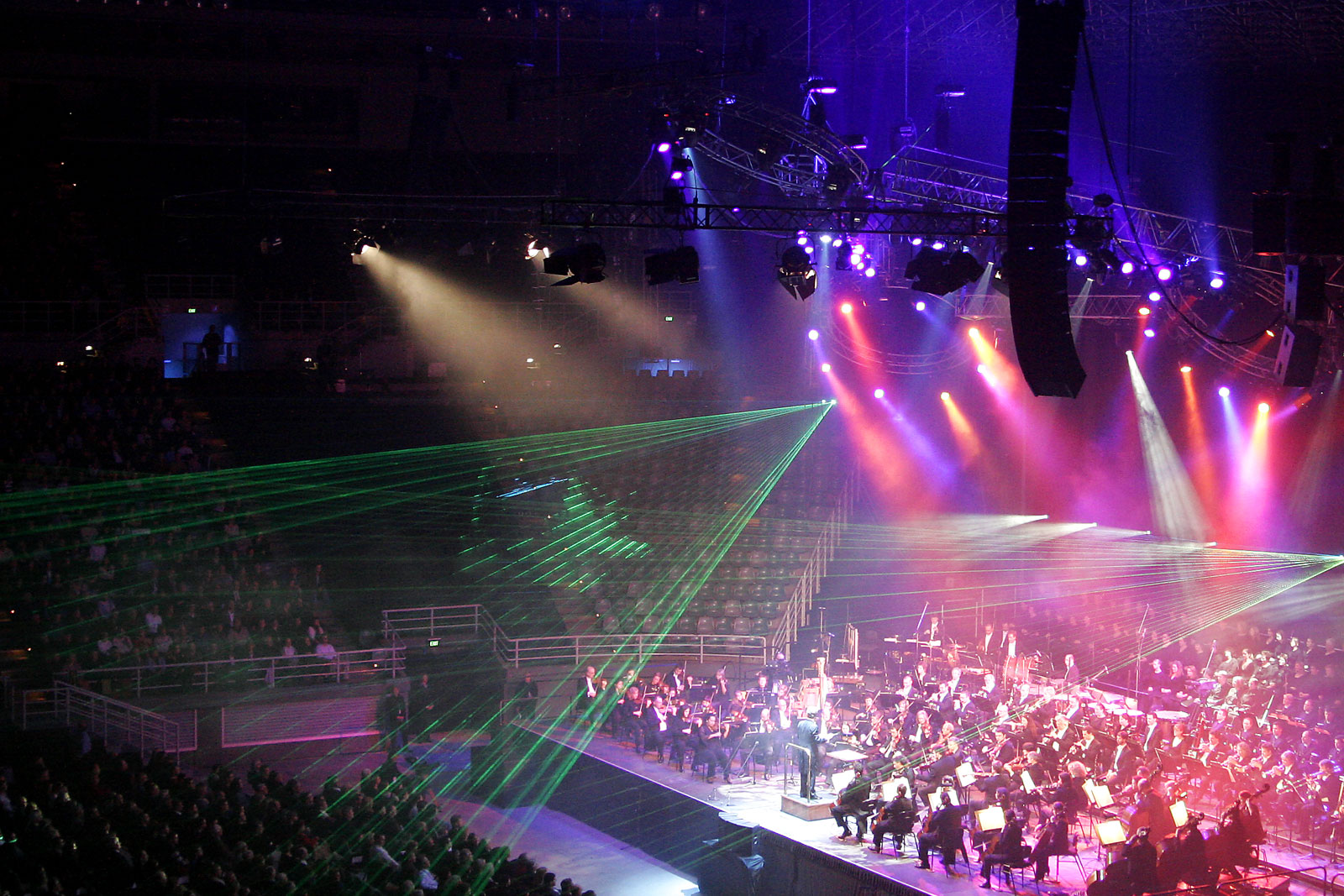
A classical music concert in the Rod Laver Arena in Melbourne, Australia, in 2005

Classical concerts embody two different styles of classical music — orchestral and choral. They are performed by a plethora of different groups in concert halls or other performing art venues. For orchestra, depending on the number of performers and the instruments used, concerts include chamber music, chamber orchestra, or symphony orchestra. Chamber orchestra is a small-scale orchestra containing between ten and forty members, mostly string instruments, and likely led by a conductor. Symphony orchestra, on the other hand, is a large-scale orchestra that can have up to eighty or more members, which is led by a conductor and is performed with instruments such as strings, woodwinds, brass instruments, and percussion. For choral style pieces, concerts include Choral music, Opera, and musical theater. Each encompassing a variety of singers who are organized by a conductor or director.

=== Rock ===
Rock concerts are those where rock musicians perform in front of audiences which may vary from small to huge stadium concerts. Mosh pits are often a feature of modern rock concerts. Rock concerts are often conducted at extremely high volume levels, near the threshold of hearing loss.

== Venues ==
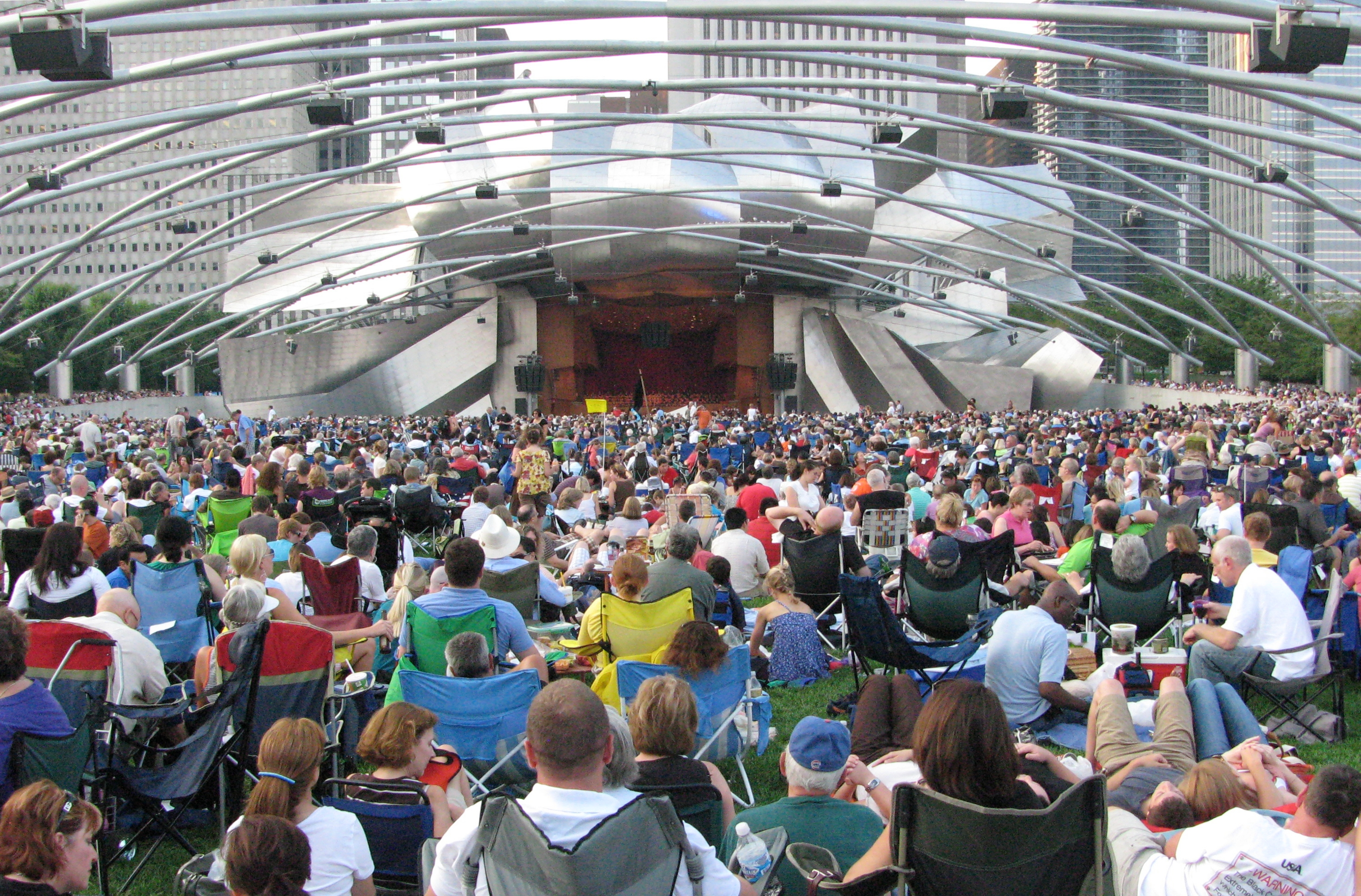
Jay Pritzker Pavilion, a bandshell at Millennium Park in Chicago

There are a wide variety of concert venues that can range in size, location, and the type of music that is hosted at that particular venue. A concert hall is a concert venue which hosts mainly classical music such as a symphony, and they are often a part of a larger performing arts center. One of the most famous concert halls is Royal Albert Hall located in the United Kingdom. This venue hosts a wide variety of genres of music from classical concerts to pop concerts. An amphitheater is an uncovered circular or oval-shaped venue with tiers of seats surrounding the stage. Amphitheaters such as the well-known Red Rocks Amphitheatre, located in Colorado, hosts mainly rock and pop concerts. Rock and pop concerts, however, are mainly held in sports stadiums and arenas such as Madison Square Garden because of the tendency for these stadiums to have a larger capacity.

== Concert series ==
=== Tour ===
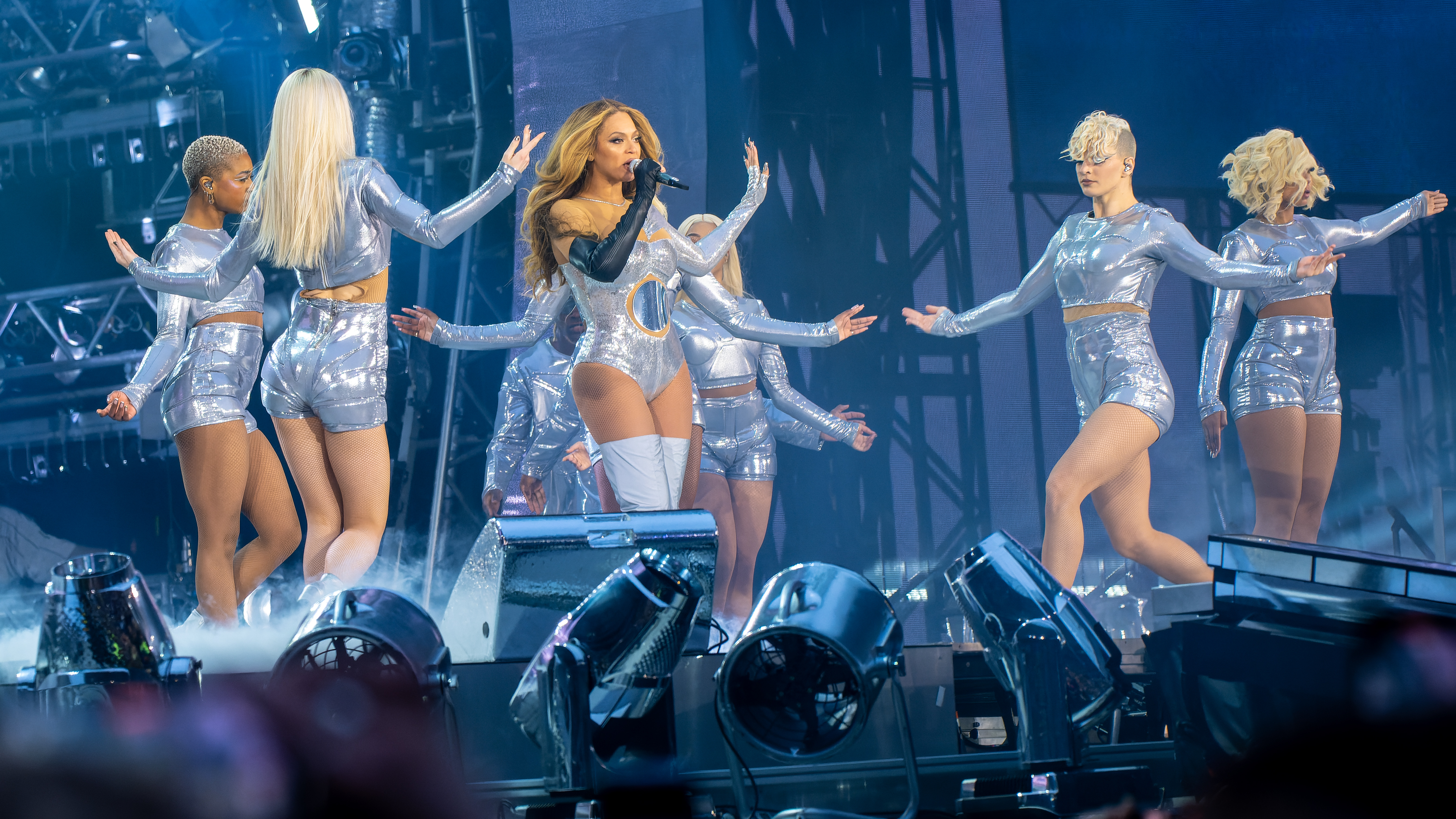
Beyoncé on her Renaissance World Tour at Tottenham Hotspur Stadium in London in 2023

A concert tour is a series of concerts by an artist or group of artists in different cities, countries, or locations. Often concert tours are named, to differentiate different tours by the same artist and associate a specific tour with a particular album or product. Especially in the popular music world, such tours can become large-scale enterprises that last for several months or even years, are seen by hundreds of thousands or millions of people, and bring in millions of dollars, or the equivalent, in ticket revenues.

=== Residency ===
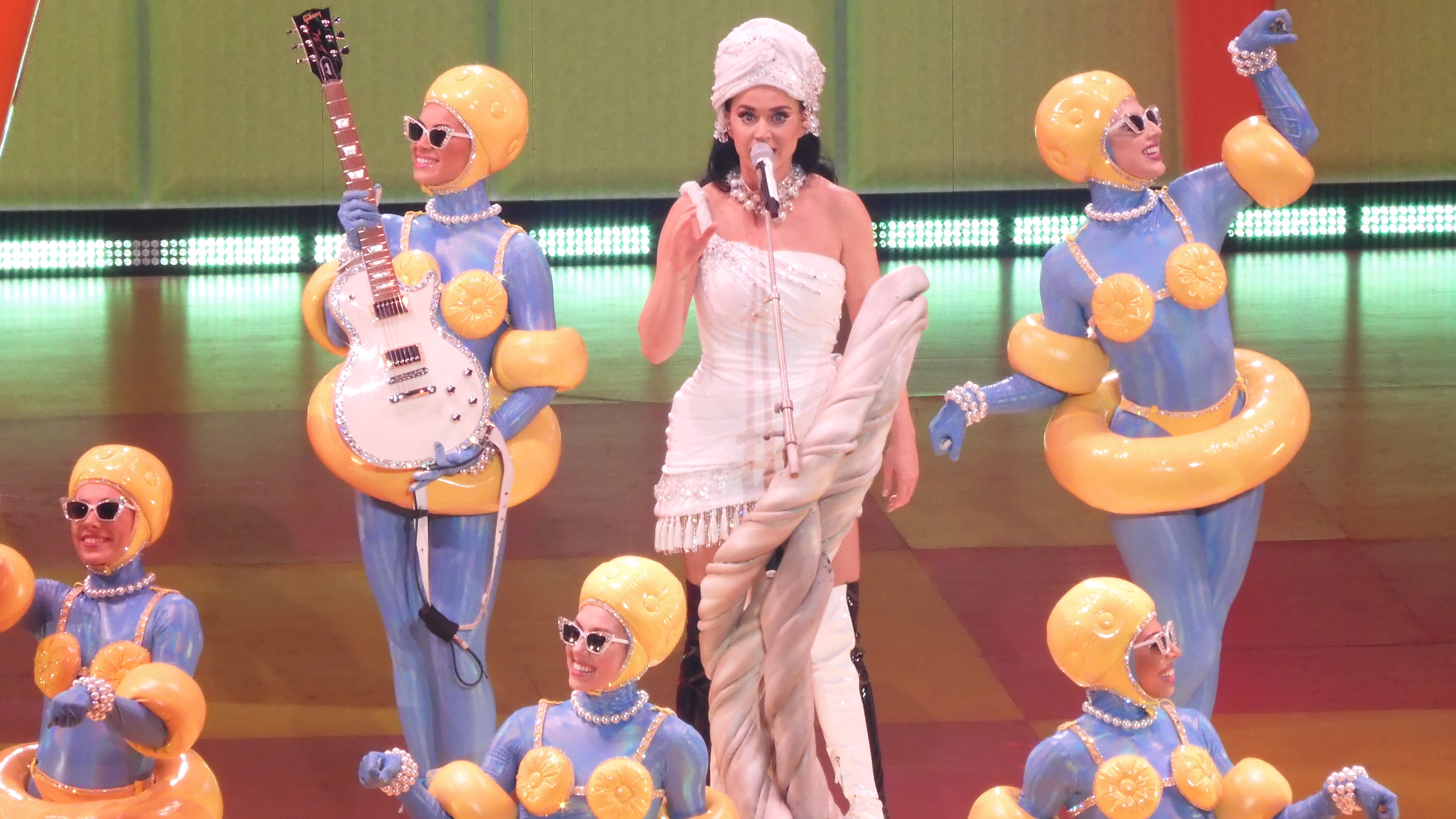
Katy Perry performing during Play

A concert residency or musical residency is a series of live music concerts similar to a concert tour, but only performed at one location. One will have fewer shows than a concert tour. Theaters generally serve as the venues for them. Concert residencies are usually associated with the city of Las Vegas. Bands and individuals might embark on one since it is easier than touring. Examples of concert residencies are Britney: Piece of Me and Play by Britney Spears and Katy Perry, respectively.

=== Festivals ===
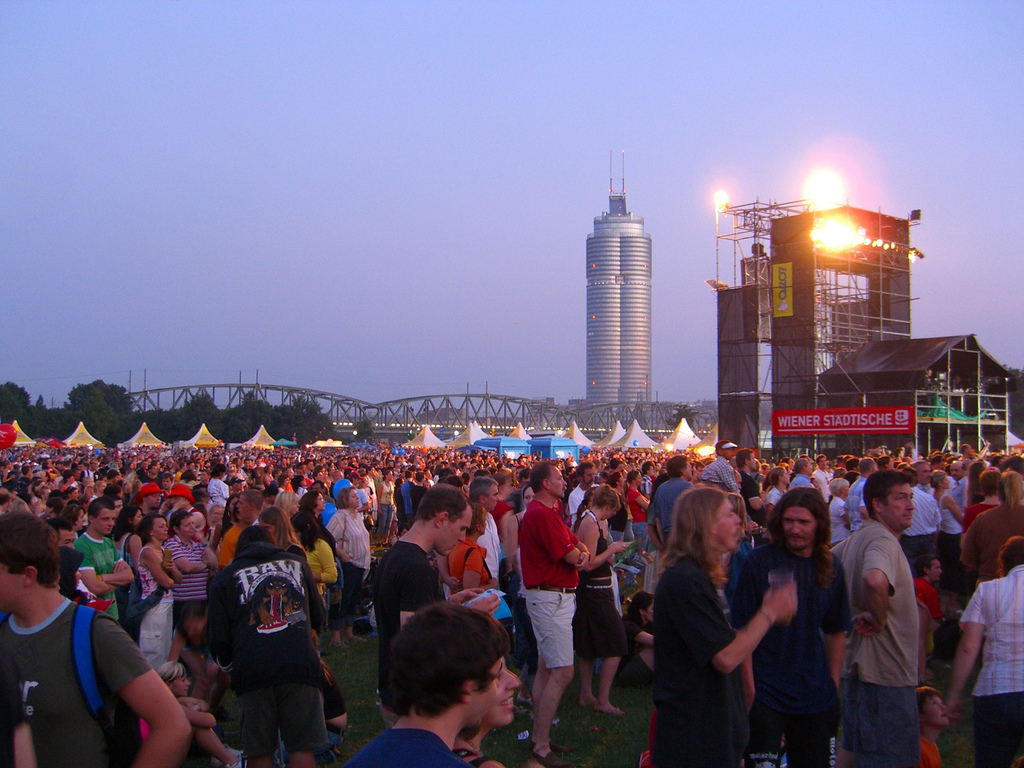
Donauinselfest is the world's largest music festival according to Guinness World Records

Concerts involving a greater number of artists, especially those that last for multiple days, are known as music festivals. Unlike other concerts, which typically remain in a single genre of music or work of a particular artist, festivals often cover a broad scope of music and arts. Due to their size, festivals are almost exclusively held outdoors. New platforms for festivals are becoming increasingly popular such as Jam Cruise, which is a festival held on a cruise ship, as well as Mayan Holidaze, which is a destination festival held in Tulum.

== Revenue ==
While admission to some concerts is free, it is common practice to charge money for concerts by selling admission tickets. Before the advent of recorded-music sales and mechanical royalties in the early 20th century, concerts were the primary source of revenue for musicians. Revenue from ticket sales typically goes to the performing artists, producers, venue, organizers and the brokers. In the case of benefit concerts, a portion of profits often go towards a charitable organization.

Additional revenue is also often raised through in-concert advertising, from free local concerts for local sponsorships to sponsorships from corporations during major tours e.g. 2009's "Vans' Warped Tour Presented by AT&T". Both Vans and AT&T would have paid significant amounts to have their company names included at the forefront in all marketing material for the Warped Tour.

Concessions and merchandise are also often sold during and after concerts; often by the venue in the case of the former, and by the performing band or artist in the case of the latter.

The global live music industry revenue stood at 28.6 billion U.S. dollars in 2023. Taylor Swift's The Eras Tour in 2023 was record-breaking, generating $1.04 billion in revenue, averaging $17.3 million per show.

== Legal ==
In September 2026 Iran Islamic Republic banned any and all form of live music performance along with serving of hukkah globally in cafes as well as public places.

== Attendance ==
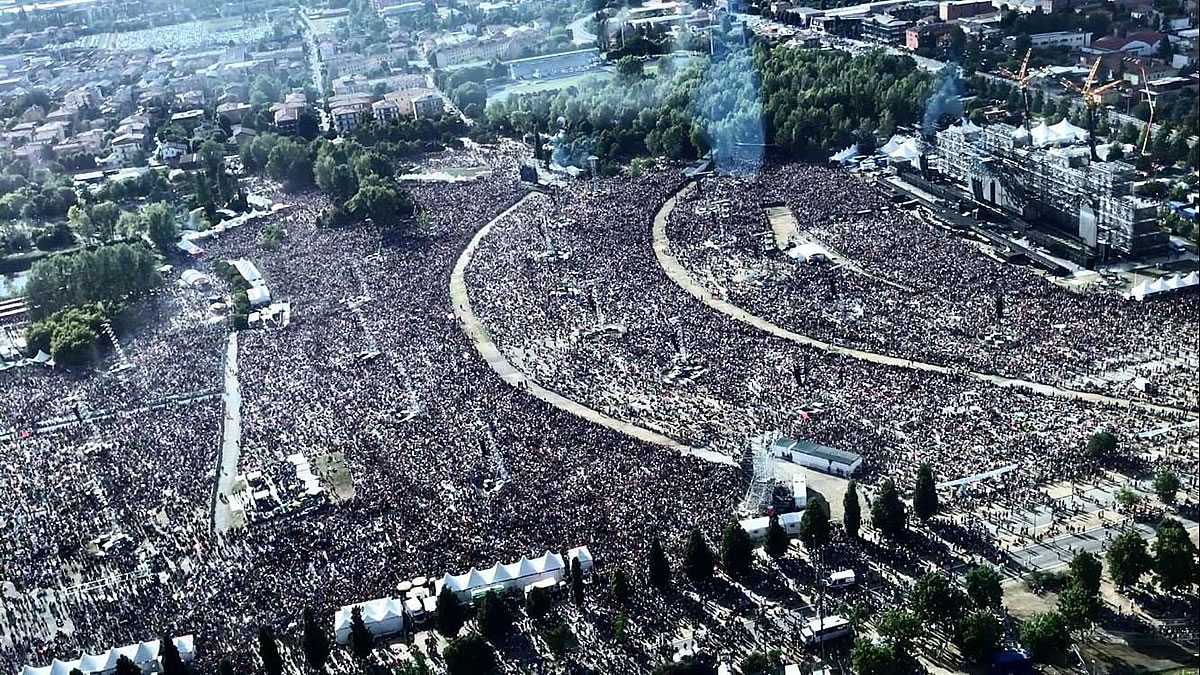
Vasco Rossi's show at Enzo Ferrari Park in Modena, Italy, which set a new world attendance record in 2017

The term "full house" is used to designate full occupancy by the audience of every seat or place at a venue. It also applies to theatrical productions and cinemas.

As of 2017, Italian singer Vasco Rossi holds the record for the biggest attendance of a ticketed concert with a total of 220,000 tickets sold for his show at Enzo Ferrari Park, Modena, Italy on 1 July 2017. The record was previously held by Paul McCartney's 1990 concert with a paying audience of 185,000 in Maracanã Stadium, Rio de Janeiro. Rod Stewart also holds the record for the biggest attendance in a free concert, with an estimated audience of 3.5 million during his 1994 New Year's Eve concert in Copacabana Beach, Rio de Janeiro.

== Concert psychology ==
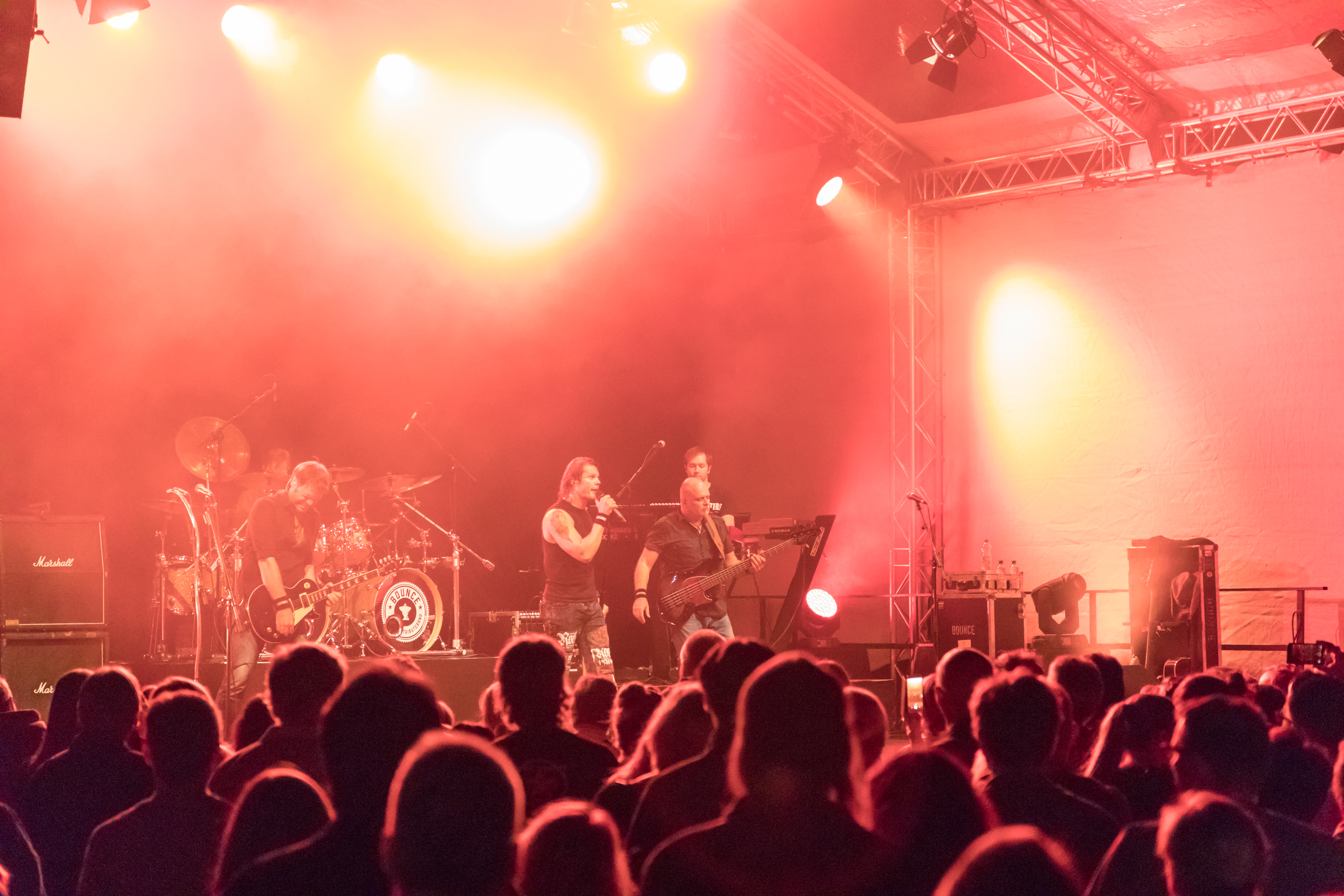
A music group performing at the open-air Dülmener Sommer concert in Germany in 2018

Many musicians performing in large venues or to a mass audience through electronic media experience stage fright or performance anxiety. The psychological stress of maintaining performance at a high level over a long concert tour is associated with depression and substance abuse.

In some concert settings, such as classical music, the audience participates passively. In other concert settings, especially folk or rock concerts, the performers encourage and engage with an active audience response. The intensity of the sound environment and the crush of the mass audience can induce a trance-like psychological state in some audience members, and beyond the music itself, functions as an entry point to achieve an altered state of consciousness. It has been proven that live music stimulates the left amygdala more than recorded music does. Vocalists and other musicians (if their instrument permits this) will often dance or strut on stage as they perform, and the audience will often dance or sway in response (space permitting); this can also be considered a manifestation of crowd psychology.

== See also ==
- Concerto
- Concert version
- Environmental impact of live music
