= Richard Popplewell =

English organist and composer (1935–2016)

Richard Popplewell LVO (18 October 1935 – 22 March 2016) was an English organist and composer who served at the Chapel Royal and St Michael's, Cornhill. Popplewell died on 22 March 2016, at the age of 80.

== Works ==
His music was published by Banks.

=== Choral ===
- A vast cloud of love (words by Madeline Chase)
- I will lift up mine eyes (Psalm 121)
- Magnificat and Nunc Dimittis in D-flat
- O how amiable (Psalm 84)
- There is no rose (Medieval words)
- Two Final Amens

=== Organ ===
- Elegy (in memory of Harold Darke)
- Puck's Shadow
- Triumphal March
- Organ Concerto 1
- Organ Concerto 2

Church of England titles
Preceded by Harold Darke 1916–1966	Organist of St Michael, Cornhill; 1966–1979	Succeeded by Jonathan Rennert
