= Gresham Professor of Music =

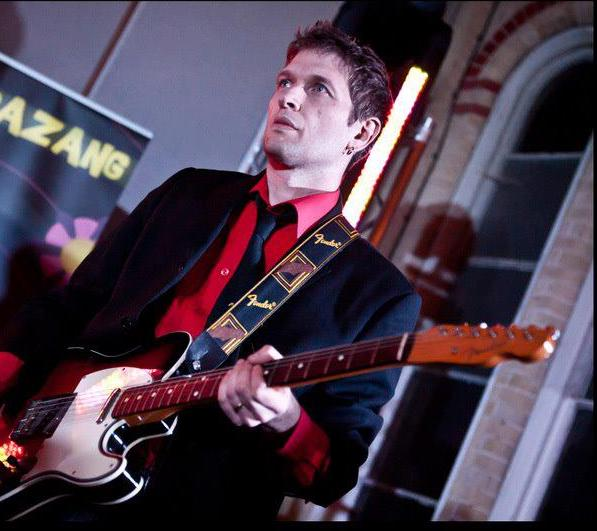
Milton Mermikides, appointed Gresham Professor of Music in 2023

The Professor of Music at Gresham College, London, gives free educational lectures to the general public. The college was founded for this purpose in 1597, when it created seven professorships; this was later increased to ten. Music is one of the original professorships as set out by the will of Thomas Gresham in 1575.

The Professor of Music is appointed in partnership with the City of London Corporation.

== List of Gresham Professors of Music ==
Note, years given as, say, 1596 / 7 refer to Old Style and New Style dates.

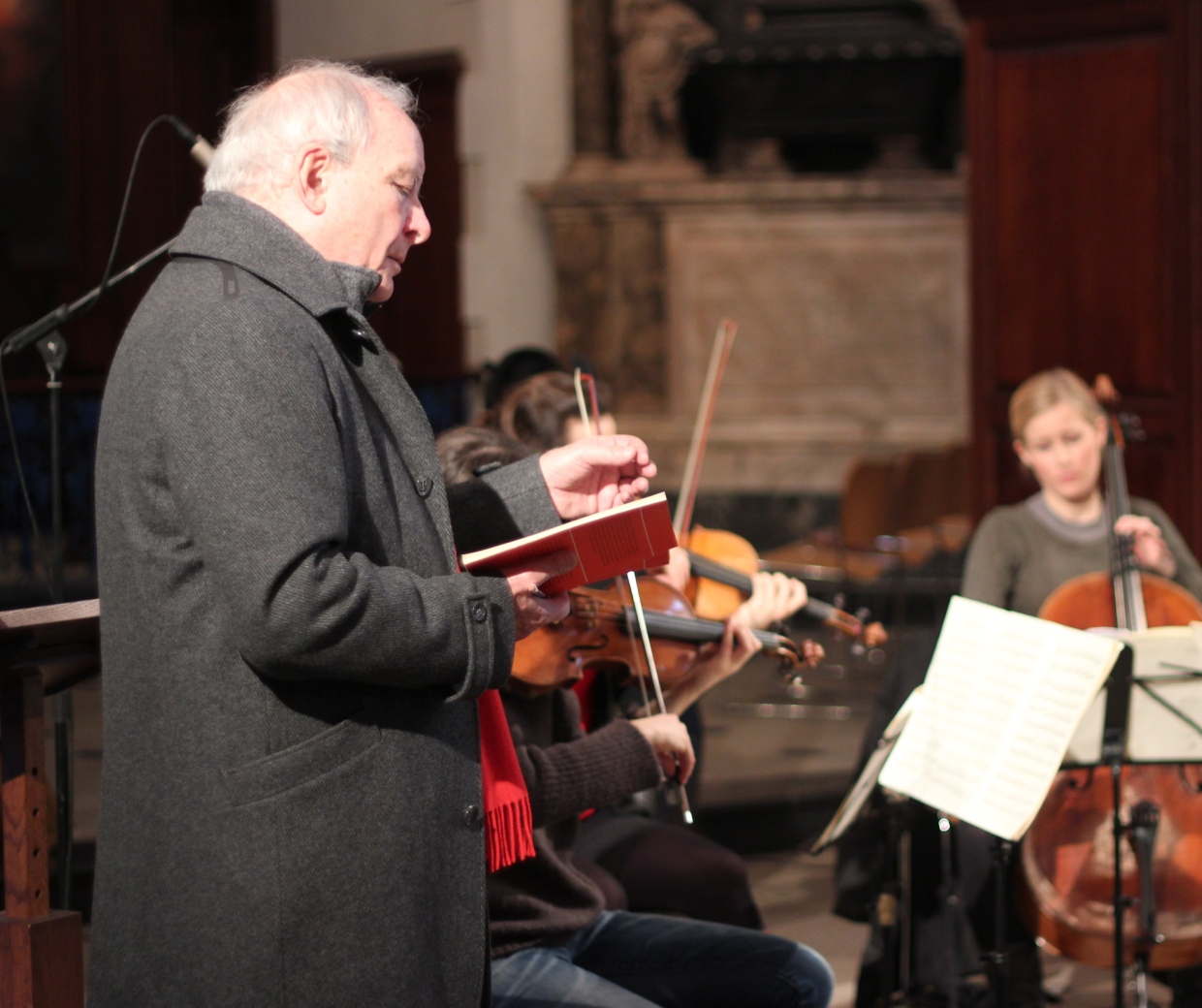
Former Gresham Professor of Music, Christopher Hogwood, leads a rehearsal ahead of his lecture on Schubert, January 2013

	Name	Started
1	John Bull	March 1596 / 7
2	Thomas Clayton	20 December 1607
3	John Taverner	17 November 1610
4	Richard Knight	28 August 1638
5	William Petty	7 February 1650 / 1
6	Thomas Baynes	8 March 1660 / 1
7	William Perry	9 August 1681
8	John Newey	9 October 1696
9	Robert Shippen	4 December 1705
10	Edward Shippen	7 October 1710
11	John Gordon	16 January 1723 / 4
12	Thomas Brome	12 March 1739 / 40
13	Charles Gardner	6 December 1745
14	Thomas Griffin	11 January 1763
15	Theodore Aylward Sr.	5 June 1771
16	R. J. S. Stevens	17 March 1801
17	Edward Taylor	24 October 1837
18	Henry Wylde	10 July 1863
19	Frederick Bridge	30 April 1890
20	Henry Walford Davies	11 July 1924
1939–45 Lectures in abeyance
21	Peter Latham	29 May 1946
22	Antony Hopkins	1963
23	Brian Trowell	1971
24	Iannis Xenakis	1975
	– vacant –	1978-79
25	A Percival	1980
	– vacant –	1983
26	John Dankworth	1984
27	Peter Renshaw	1986
28	David Owen Norris	1 September 1993
29	Stephen Pratt / Joanna MacGregor	1 September 1997
30	Piers Hellawell	1 September 2000
31	Adrian Thomas	1 September 2003
32	Roger Parker FBA	1 September 2006
33	Christopher Hogwood CBE	1 September 2010
34	Christopher Page FBA	1 September 2014
35	Tom Service	2018
36	Marina Frolova-Walker	2019
37	Milton Mermikides	2023

== Sources ==
- List of professors, Gresham College old website, Internet Archive, 2004.
