= Philip Hart (organist) =

English organist and composer (1674 or 1676 – 1749

- Born: 1674 or 1676
- Died: 18 July 1749
- Occupations: Organist, composer
- Instrument: Church organ

Philip Hart (1674 or 1676 – 18 July 1749) was an English organist and composer.

== Life ==
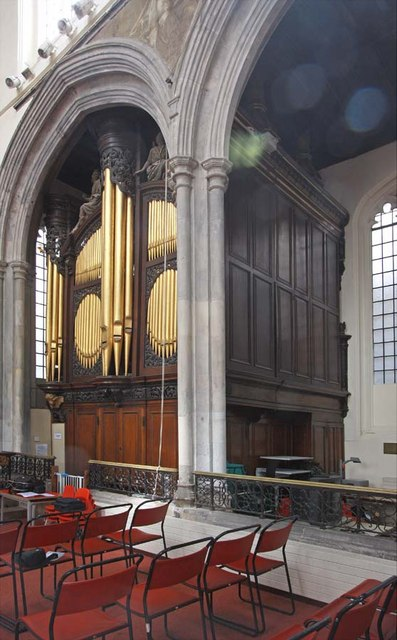
The organ of St Andrew Undershaft

His father, James Hart (1647–1718), was a gentleman of the Chapel Royal, chorister of Westminster Abbey, and a composer.

Philip Hart was for many years organist of churches in London: he became assistant organist of St Andrew Undershaft in 1696, sole organist from 1697 until his death; he was organist of St Michael, Cornhill from 1704 to 1723. On 28 May 1724 he was elected the first organist of St Dionis Backchurch. He died, at an advanced age, on 17 July 1749, and was buried at St Andrew Undershaft on 22 July.

Hart was said by the writer John Hawkins to have been a sound musician, but to have "entertained little relish" for innovations. Hawkins also described Hart's frequent use of the "shake" in playing, and recorded how he was wont to discourse on music at Thomas Britton's house in the company of Handel, Pepusch and others.

== Compositions ==
- "An Ode to Harmony", his setting of John Hughes's "Ode in Praise of Musick", performed on Saint Cecilia's day 1703
- Fugues for the Organ or Harpsichord
- Anthems: "I will give thanks", and "Praise the Lord, ye Servants"
- Many songs, including "A Song upon the Safe Return of His Majesty King William", written about 1700, "Sound the Trumpet", which was written in 1734 to celebrate the wedding of the Prince of Orange and the Princess Royal, and others, like "Ye Curious Winds", in Handelian style.
- The hymn tune "Hilderstone"; it was later included in Church Hymns (1874) and in Hymns Ancient and Modern (Standard Edition, 1916)
