= John Banister (composer) =

English composer and violinist

John Banister (1630 – 3 October 1679) was an English musical composer and violinist.

== Early life ==
Banister was the son of one of the waits (municipal musicians) of the parish of St. Giles-in-the-Fields, and that profession he at first followed. His father was his first instructor, and he arrived at such proficiency on the violin that Charles II became interested in him and sent him for further education to France. On his return, Charles appointed him to the post of leader of his own band, vacated by the death of Thomas Baltzar in 1663.

== Court life ==
About 1666–1667 he is said to have been dismissed by the king for an impertinent remark concerning the appointment of French musicians to the royal band. This seems to be referred to in Pepys's Diary, dated 20 February 1666 – 1667, although Banister's name occurs in a list of the King's Chapel in 1668.

When we come to the Duke of York here ... they talk also how the King’s viallin, Bannister, is mad that the King hath a Frenchman come to be chief of some part of the King’s musique, at which the Duke of York made great mirth.

— Samuel Pepys, 20 February 1666, The diary of Samuel Pepys

== Concerts ==
On 30 December 1672, he inaugurated a series of concerts at his own house, which are remarkable as being the first lucrative concerts given in London. One peculiarity of the arrangements was that the audience, on payment of one shilling, were entitled to demand what music they wished to be performed. These entertainments continued to be given by him, as we learn from advertisements in the London Gazette of the period, until within a short time of his death, which took place on 3 October 1679. He was buried in the cloisters of Westminster Abbey.

== Compositions ==
His most important composition is the music to the tragedy of Circe by Dr. C. Davenant, which was performed at the Duke of York's Theatre in 1676. Manuscript copies of the first act are preserved in the library of the Royal College of Music, and in the Fitzwilliam Museum at Cambridge. In the same year he wrote music to The Tempest in conjunction with Pelham Humphrey.

Several songs by Banister, some of them belonging to some classic tragedy of which the name is unknown, and written jointly with Dr. Blow, are in a manuscript in the Christ Church Library, Oxford. In the contemporary collections of printed music his name occurs frequently. Besides his vocal compositions, he wrote a great many short pieces for one, two, and three violins, and also for the lute. He was especially skilled in writing upon a ground bass.

== Family ==
His son, John Banister the Younger, was a pupil of his father's, and became, like him, a violinist in the royal band. He performed under Charles II, James II, William III and Mary II, and Anne. When the first Italian operas were given in England at the Theatre Royal, Drury Lane, he played the first violin. He died in 1735. There is a portrait of John in the National Portrait Gallery in London.
