= Piers Hellawell =

British composer and professor of composition

Piers Hellawell (born 14 July 1956) is a British composer and professor of composition, currently residing in The Western Isles of Scotland.

== Biography ==
Hellawell grew up in England and studied composition with James Wood and later Nicholas Maw at the University of Oxford. At the age of 24, he was appointed as Composer-in-Residence at Queens University, Belfast where, in 2002, he was made Professor of Composition. His music is published by Edition Peters Ltd, based in London. From 2000 to 2003, Hellawell held the Gresham Chair of Music in the City of London. Hellawell's works are represented by the ECM (New Series), NMC and Metier labels and on Metronome Label.

== Musical works ==
In 1999, Hellawell wrote Inside Story, which was premiered at the Proms and led to a CD featuring the piece alongside other recent major works on the Metronome Label in 2002. This CD was named BBC Music Magazine CD of the Month. In the same year, the Hilliard Ensemble and the Ostrobothnian Chamber Orchestra also premiered his piece The Pear Tree of Nicostratus at the Kaustinen Festival in Finland.

Two years later, his piece Cors de chasse was premiered by the Philharmonia Orchestra with Håkan Hardenberger and Jonas Bylund at the Brighton Festival. Following his work with the Hilliard Ensemble, he wrote a set of pieces The Hilliard Songbook which referenced their ECM records album from 1996. In the same year, the songbook played a part in their 30th Anniversary celebrations which was given at the Wigmore Hall in London. In the same year, his piece Degrees of Separation was composed for the opening of The Sage Gateshead. Sound Carvings from the Bell Foundry was premiered by Stockholm Chamber Brass in Norway and Ireland in 2006, which marked Hellawell's 50th birthday

In 2008, Hellawell worked with the BBC National Orchestra of Wales and the clarinettist Robert Plane in creating a piece Agricolas, premiered at the Vale of Glamorgan Festival that year. Two years following this, his piano piece Syzygy was performed by William Howard at the Spitalfields Festival in London. In 2013, he was commissioned by the Swedish Chamber Orchestra and the Stockholm Kammarbrass Syzygy which was premiered in the spring of that year and supported the Leverhulme Fellowship.

In 2015, his work Wild Flow (for orchestra) became a major commission for the 2016 BBC Proms based in London. To mark his 60th birthday in 2016, he was appointed a residency at the Great Lakes Festival in Detroit in June of that year. He also had works performed at the Cheltenham International Festival the following month.

== Awards ==
Piers Hellawell has been commissioned by many leading international ensembles such as the Hilliard Ensemble, the Philharmonia Orchestra, Stockholm Chamber Brass, Swedish Chamber Orchestra, Hard Rain SoloistEnsemble and the Schubert Ensemble. His music has been performed around the world and has also encountered regular collaborations and engagements with the BBC Proms.

== List of works ==
=== Orchestral ===
- Quadruple Elegy (in the time of freedom) (1990)
- Memorial Cairns (1992) – Commissioned by Ulster Orchestra Society for the Ulster Orchestra Sinfonia with funds provided by the Arts Council of Northern Ireland
- Sound Carvings Without Words (1997)
- Drum of the Nåjd (1997) – Commissioned by Northern Sinfonia
- Inside Story (1999) for violin, viola and orchestra – Commissioned by BBC for the 1999 BBC Promenade Concerts
- Cors de chasse (2003) – Commissioned by the Philharmonia Orchestra and the Brighton Festival
- Degrees of Separation (2003–04) – Commissioned by The Sage, Gateshead with funds from North Music Trust
- Dogs and Wolves (2005) – Commissioned by BBC Radio 3
- Agricolas (2008) – Commissioned by Robert Plane with funds from the Britten-Pears Foundation and Vaughan-Williams Trust
- Syzygy (2012) – Commissioned by Swedish CO and Stockholm Chamber Brass
- Wild Flow (2016) – Commissioned by the BBC for the 2016 Proms

=== Ensemble ===
- Huckbard's Delight by Huckbard the One legged. (c1974) written for a school inter house competition, and so for a limited ensemble of Oboe, two Flutes, Double Bass and Harp.
- Dance Paragraphs (1983) – Commissioned by Richard Hosford.
- How Should I Your True Love Know? (1984)
- Sound Carvings from Rano Raraku (1988 rev. 1992) – Commissioned by Newry and Mourne Arts Centre with funds provided by the Arts Council of Northern Ireland
- O Whistle And I'll Come To You (1988)
- The Erratic Aviator's Dance (1989)
- Truth or Consequences (1991) – Commissioned by Association for Business Sponsorship of the Arts with funds provided by British Telecom
- The Still Dancers (1992) – Commissioned by Britten String Quartet with funds provided by the Arts Council of Great Britain
- Victory Boogie-Woogie (1993) – Commissioned by the Riga Piano Duo with funds provided by the Arts Council of Great Britain
- High Citadels (1994) – Commissioned by Jörg Vogel with funds provided by the Arts Council of Northern Ireland
- Sound Carvings from the Ice Wall (1994) – Commissioned by BBC Radio 3
- Sound Carvings from the Water's Edge (1996) – Commissioned by The Highland Festival with funds provided by the Arts Council of Northern Ireland
- Hall of Mirrors (1998) – Commissioned by Chamber Music 2000
- The Building of Curves (1998) – Commissioned by the Schubert Ensemble of London with funds provided by the Schubert Ensemble Trust
- A White Room (1999) – Commissioned by Chamber Music 2000
- Litholatry (2001) – Commissioned by Bournemouth Orchestras with funds provided by the David James Trust
- Driftwood on Sand (2001) – Commissioned by the Londonderry Music Society with funds from the National Lottery
- Weaver of Grass (2002) – Commissioned by the Brighton International Festival, the Schubert Ensemble Trust and the Steel Foundation
- Landscape with Portraits (2004) – Commissioned by Chamber Domaine.
- Degrees of Separation (2003–04) – Commissioned by The Sage, Gateshead with funds from North Music Trust
- Tidy Your Room (2005) – Commissioned by Chamber Music 2000
- Maquette (2005) – Commissioned by COMA.
- Sound Carvings from the Bell Foundry (2006) – Commissioned by Kristiansand Festival and Belfast Festival at Queen's
- Etruscan Games (2007) – Commissioned by Gerry Mattock and Beryl Calver-Jones for the Da Vinci Trio
- Hide In The Attic (2009) – Commissioned by Chamber Music 2000
- Minnesang (2011) – Commissioned by Sarah Watts with funds provided by the Vaughan Williams Trust
- atria (2013) – Commissioned by Belfast Music Society (BMS)
- Sound Carvings, Strange Tryst (2014)- Commissioned by Moving On Music with funds from the PRS Foundation for Music New Music Biennial 2014
- Fictions (2015) – Commissioned by Stony Brook Contemporary
- Up By The Roots (2016) – Commissioned by Fidelio Trio for PRS for Music
- Russian Doll (2017) – Commissioned by Brant Tilds with funds from RV-W Trust
- Ground Truthing (2018) - Commissioned by Hard Rain SoloistEnsemble with funds provided by Arts Council of Northern Ireland.

=== Solo instrumental ===
- Improvise! Improvise! (1985)
- Seal Songs (1986)
- Squam Songs (1988)
- Das Leonora Notenbuch (1988) – Commissioned by Buxton Festival for William Howard with funds provided by North West Arts
- Camera Obscura (1994) – Commissioned by Philip Mead with funds from South West Arts
- Airs, Waters and Floating Islands (1995) – Commissioned by The Holst Foundation
- Takla Makan (1995) – Commissioned by Cheltenham International Festival with funds from South West Arts
- Basho (1996)
- Let's Dance (1996) – Commissioned by Daniella Ganeva
- Piani, Latebre (2010) – Commissioned by Landmark Chambers for William Howard
- Balcony Scenes (2014) – Commissioned by Fenella Humphreys for her 'Bach To The Future' project
- Love On The Escalator (2016) – Commissioned by William Howard for his ‘Love Songs' project
- Ali Dorate (2016)

=== Vocal and choral ===
- The Fairies (1981) – Commissioned by Queen's University Children's Choir for BBC ‘Let The Peoples Sing'
- River and Shadow (1993) – Commissioned by the Hilliard Ensemble with funds provided by the Arts Council of Great Britain
- Fatal Harmony (1993)
- The Hilliard Songbook (1995) – Commissioned by the 1995 Hilliard Summer Festival
- Quem Quaeritis (1995 rev. 1998) – Commissioned by Sinfonia 21
- Do Not Disturb (1997) – Commissioned by the London Symphony Orchestra
- Four Delays (1997) – Commissioned for 70th Birthday of Sir John Manduell
- The Pear Tree of Nicostratus (2001) – Commissioned by Kaustinen Chamber Music Days, Finland
- Inventing You (2005) – Commissioned by Karl Renner
- Four Delays (2007)
- Isabella's Banquet (2010) – Commissioned by Beryl Calver-Jones and Gerry Mattock
- Philautia (2014) – Commissioned by South Bank Centre for Juice at 2014 ‘Love Songs' Festival, SBC, London

Two Madrigals and a Motet (2015) – Commissioned by Singer Pur Ensemble, Germany
