= John Gerrish =

American composer of the 20th century

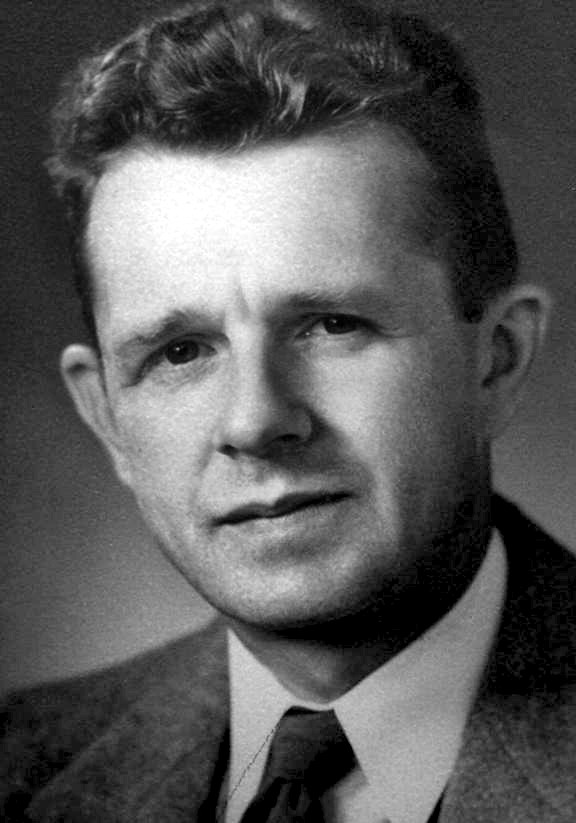
John O. Gerrish c.1950

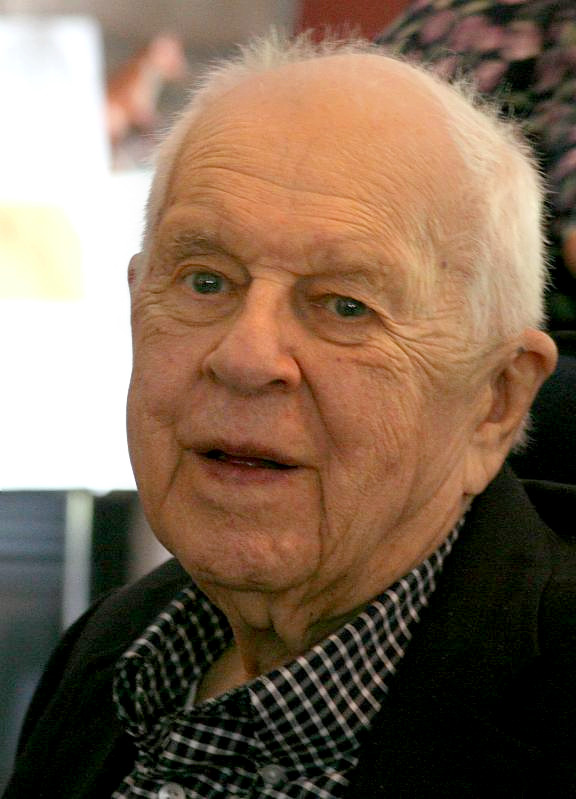
John O. Gerrish 2010

John O'Neill Gerrish (August 14, 1910 – November 29, 2010) was an American composer of the 20th century, best known for The Falcon, a cappella piece for SATB based on the Middle or Early Modern English Corpus Christi Carol.

== Early life ==
Gerrish was the son of Charles Percy Gerrish and Mary Elizabeth O'Neill of Potsdam, New York. He graduated from Crane School of Music in 1930, and led a dance band during the 1930s. He taught for ten years at Franklin Academy in Malone, New York and was a professor of music at Kean University in New Jersey for most of his career.

== Music ==
In addition to The Falcon, Gerrish's better-known works include Variations on a Burgundian Carol for 3 Recorders, based on the carol Patapan, published in New York by Associated Music Publishers in 1957. Reviewer, Joel Newman, called the work "neatly-constructed, fun-to-play, but merely-cute variations." Other published compositions include Why do the Bells of Christmas Ring? (1952) a cappella choir, I Sing A Maiden (1953), Fifteen Christmas melodies for soprano recorder and piano (1954), and the piano solos Country Dance, Mountain Climbing and South Wind (1954).

The Music Educators Journal published a detailed article and interview "A Family Program for Voices, Recorders, and Viols: The Gerrish Family" in 1962. The New York State Teachers Association, Northern Zone, lists John Gerrish as Chairman of Music Section in Malone, New York, September 29, 1939.

== Personal life ==
Gerrish married twice. After the death of his first wife, Marion Benham of Saranac Lake, he married Claire Stackpole of Winooski. Following his retirement, Gerrish was the organist at the Winooski United Methodist Church for twenty years. He died on November 29, 2010, and is buried at St. Mary's Cemetery, Potsdam.
