= Kevin Siegfried =

American composer (born 1969)

- Born: 1969 (age 56–57)
- Occupation: Composer

Kevin Siegfried (born 1969) is an American composer. He has been composer-in-residence with the Capitol Hill Chorale since 2014, and teaches at the Boston Conservatory at Berklee.

== Life and career ==
Siegfried earned his bachelor's degree at Antioch College. He then attended the University of Iowa, where he received a master's degree in theory and composition; among his professors was Donald Martin Jenni. He completed a doctorate in composition at the New England Conservatory of Music, where his instructors included Lee Hyla, Michael Gandolfi, and Daniel Pinkham. He also studied in France and in India, where he received a Stanley Fellowship to study South Indian classical music with Sriram Parasuram. He has received grants and awards from ASCAP, the National Endowment for the Arts, and the New Hampshire State Council on the Arts, among other organizations. He currently lives in Andover, Massachusetts. At the Boston Conservatory at Berklee, he is a Professor of Theater, and Coordinator of Theory and New Works. In 2017, he was the winner of Berklee's Distinguished Faculty Award.

Siegfried is especially noted for his work with the music of the Shakers, which he first encountered in 1995 during a visit to the Shaker village at Pleasant Hill, Kentucky. He has since produced many choral arrangements of Shaker songs, and has composed a cantata, Angel of Light, for which they served as a basis. He has been associated for some time with Canterbury Shaker Village in New Hampshire, and Sabbathday Lake Shaker Village in Maine, as of 2017 the home of the last living Shakers. Siegfried's arrangements of Shaker music have been recorded by the Tudor Choir and the Dale Warland Singers. He has also written works for the Nashua Symphony Orchestra in Nashua, New Hampshire.

Siegfried's music is published by G. Schirmer, E. C. Schirmer, Earthsongs, MorningStar, and Trinitas.

== Works ==
Siegfried's works include:

=== Selected choral works ===
- Shaker Songs (1998) for SATB choir
- Media Vita (2000) for SSATB choir
- At the Water's Edge (2004) for SATB choir and harp
- Three English Carols (2007) for SATB choir ("There is no rose", "I syng of a mayden", "Adam lay ybounden")
- Songs for the Journey (2010) for soprano, SATB choir, 2 horns, harp, organ, and low strings
- Three Horizons (2010) for SATB choir and piano
- Child of Earth (2011) cantata in 5 movements for mezzo-soprano, SATB choir, harp, and string orchestra
- Annunciation (2012) for SATB choir
- Conditor alme siderum (2014) for SATB choir
- Angel of Light (2015) cantata in 7 movements for soprano and SATB choir
- Vidimus Stellam (2016) Christmas cantata in 5 movements for SATB choir and brass quintet
- Music of the Spheres (2017) for SATB choir and glass armonica
- Appalachian Carols (2017) for SATB choir (based on the music of Jean Ritchie)

=== Selected chamber music ===
- Square One (2002) for 4 marimbas
- Arcs and Circles (2003) for piano
- Tracing a Wheel on Water (2003) for guitar
- Musica Sacra (2004) 3 movements for string orchestra
- Cradle Song (2007) for guitar
- Land of Pure Delight (2014) – Shaker songs and dances for string quartet
