= Nowell Sing We =

Nowell Sing We may refer to:

- "Nowel syng we now", a song on the 15th-century Trinity Carol Roll
- "Nowell sing we, both all and some", a 1972 arrangement of carols by Raymond Monelle
- Nowell Sing We! Advent and Christmas at New College, a 2016 album with Robert Quinney, Director of the Choir of New College, Oxford
- "Masters in This Hall", or "Nowell, Sing We Clear", a Christmas carol by William Morris

== See also ==
- "The First Noel"
- List of carols at the Nine Lessons and Carols, King's College Chapel
- Nowell Sing We Clear, a musical group
