= List of carols at the Nine Lessons and Carols, King's College Chapel =

List of Christmas songs

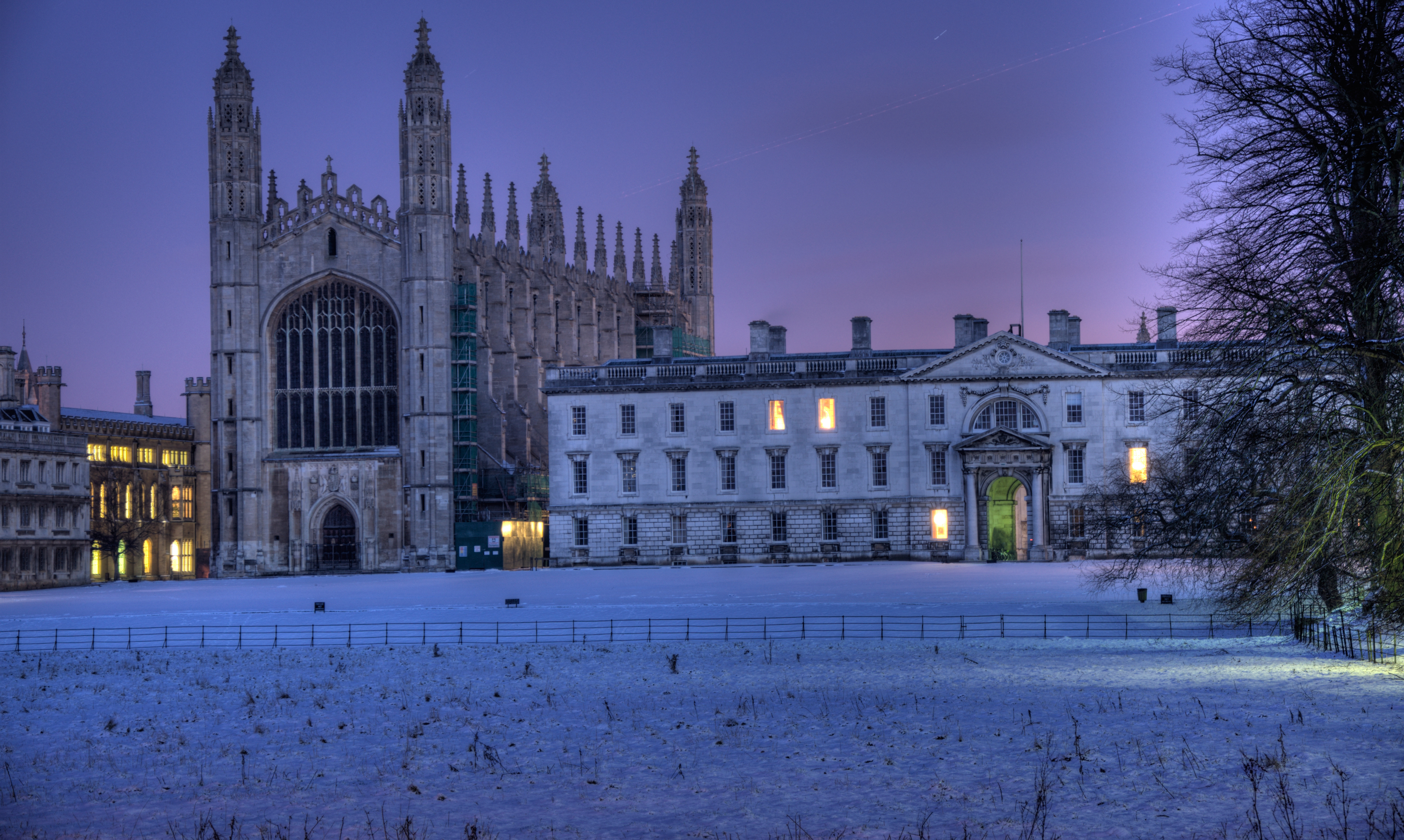
The west end of King's College Chapel seen from The Backs, with Clare College Old Court on the left and the Gibbs' Building of King's College on the right.

This is a list of carols performed at the Festival of Nine Lessons and Carols at King's College Chapel, Cambridge. The Festival is an annual church service held on Christmas Eve (24 December) at King's College Chapel in Cambridge, United Kingdom. The Nine Lessons, which are the same every year, are read by representatives of the college and of the City of Cambridge from the 1611 Authorized King James Version of the Bible.

The service is broadcast live in the United Kingdom on BBC Radio 4, and abroad on the BBC's overseas programmes as well; it is estimated that each year there are millions of listeners worldwide who listen to it live on the BBC World Service. In the UK, a recorded broadcast is also made on Christmas Day on BBC Radio 3. A television programme entitled Carols from King's which is pre-recorded in early or mid-December is shown on Christmas Eve in the UK on BBC Two and BBC Four.

== Carols ==
In the table below, carols specially commissioned for the Choir of King's College Chapel are highlighted in green. To rearrange the table alphabetically or numerically by a particular column, click on the arrow symbol in the column heading.

Title	Year of first performance	Lyricist	Composer	Notes
Adam Lay Ybounden	1955	15th century	Ord, Boris	
Adam Lay Ybounden	2023	15th century	Martin, Matthew	
Alleluia! A New Work is Come on Hand	1966	15th century	Wishart, Peter Charles Arthur	
The Angel Gabriel	2019	From a Basque original	Moore, Philip	
The Angel Gabriel Descended to a Virgin	2002	15th–17th century	Holloway, Robin	
The Angels (Should you hear them singing among stars)	1994	Taylor, John V.	Harvey, Jonathan	
Angels from the Realms of Glory	1978	Montgomery, James	Old French tune, arranged by Philip Ledger	
Angelus ad Virginem	2022	13th century	Martin, Matthew	
Away in a Manger	2005	19th century	Tavener, John	
The Birthday of thy King (Awake, glad heart, get up, and sing!)	1988	Vaughan, Henry (adapted)	Sculthorpe, Peter	
Carol of St. Steven	1989	W. Sandys' Christmas Carols (adapted)	Goehr, Alexander	
A Child is Born in Bethlehem	1966	14th century Benedictine processional, translated by G.R. Woodward and others	Scheidt, Samuel	
Christo Paremus Cantica	1993	15th century	Burrell, Diana	
The Cradle	2023	Anonymous, 17th century Austrian, translated by Robert Graves	Frances-Hoad, Cheryl	
The Fayrfax Carol	1997	Early Tudor	Adès, Thomas	
Frohlocket, ihr Völker auf Erden (Rejoice, O Ye Peoples of the Earth)	[Unknown]	Anonymous	Mendelssohn, Felix	
A Gathering	1991	Andrewes, Lancelot	Casken, John	
The Gleam (Not yet shepherds the gilded kings)	2003	Plaice, Stephen	Birtwistle, Harrison	
Glory, Alleluia to the Christ Child! (Out of the Orient Crystal Skies)	[Unknown, sung 2008]	17th century	Bullard, Alan	
God Rest You Merry, Gentlemen	1919	English traditional	English traditional, arranged by David V. Willcocks	
God would be Born in Thee (Lo, in the Silent Night a Child in God is Born)	2004	Silesius, Angelus	Bingham, Judith	
Hark! The Herald Angels Sing	1918 and every year since	Wesley, Charles, and Whitefield, George	Mendelssohn-Bartholdy, Jakob Ludwig Felix; descant by Stephen J. Cleobury	
A Hymn to the Mother of God	[Unknown]	Liturgy of Saint Basil	Tavener, John	
I Saw Three Ships	[Unknown]	Traditional English	Traditional English, arranged by Simon Preston	
I Sing of a Maiden	1965	15th century	Berkeley, Lennox (also sung in a version by Patrick Hadley)	
If Ye would Hear the Angels Sing	[Unknown, sung 2008]	Greenwell, Dora	Tranchell, Peter	
Illuminare Jerusalem	1985	Bannatyne manuscript in John MacQueen; Winifred MacQueen (1972), A Choice of Scottish Verse, 1470–1570, London: Faber and Faber, ISBN 0-571-09532-1 (adapted).	Weir, Judith	
In Dulci Jubilo (In Sweet Rejoicing)	1918	14th-century German	de Pearsall, Robert Lucas; edited by Reginald Jacques	
In Dulci Jubilo (In Sweet Rejoicing)	1988	14th-century German	Praetorius, Hieronymous	
In the Bleak Midwinter	[Unknown]	Rossetti, Christina	Darke, Harold Edwin	
In Wintertime (When Thou wast born in wintertime)	1983	Askwith, Betty	Berkeley, Lennox	
Infant Holy, Infant Lowly	[Unknown, sung 2008]	Polish traditional, translated by Edith M.G. Reed	Polish traditional, arranged by Stephen J. Cleobury	
King Herod and the Cock (There was a star in David's land)	1977	[Unknown]	Walton, William	
The Lamb (Little lamb, who made thee?)	1982	Blake, William	Tavener, John	Although the carol was first performed at the Festival in 1982, its première performance was given by the Winchester Cathedral Choir a few days before.
Misere' Nobis (Jesu of a Maiden Thou wast Born)	2006	Medieval English carol (adapted)	Turnage, Mark-Anthony	
The Night when She First Gave Birth (Mary)	2008	Brecht, Bertolt, translated by Michael Hamburger	Muldowney, Dominic	
Noël (Now comes the dawn) (Stardust and vaporous light)	2007	Gilder, Richard Watson	Dean, Brett	
Nowel, Nowel, Holly Dark	1986	de la Mare, Walter	Bennett, Richard Rodney	
Nowell Sing We Now All and Some	1984	Medieval	Medieval, edited by John Stevens	
O Come, All Ye Faithful	1918 and every year since	18th-century Latin, translated by Frederick Oakeley	Wade, John Francis	Traditionally the arrangement by David Willcocks is used.
O Mercy Divine	2018	Wesley, Charles	Weir, Judith	Written to mark the centennial service in 2018.
On Christmas Day to My Heart	1999	Paman, Clement	Bennett, Richard Rodney	
Once in Royal David's City	1918 and every year since	Alexander, Mrs. Cecil Frances	Gauntlett, Henry J.; arr. A. H. Mann, David Willcocks, Stephen Cleobury, et al.	Since 1919 this carol has always been the processional carol, with verse 1 sung unaccompanied by a boy soloist.
O radiant dawn	2023	Isaiah 9.2	MacMillan, James	
Out of youre slepe	2023	15th-century	Nelson, Robin	
One Star, at Last (Fix on one star)	1984	Brown, George Mackay	Davies, Peter Maxwell	
The Oxen (Christmas Eve and twelve of the clock)	1982	Hardy, Thomas	Radcliffe, Philip	Radcliffe was a longtime Fellow in Music of King's College.
Pilgrim Jesus (Iesus! Christus! In the manger of my body)	1996	Crossley-Holland, Kevin	Paulus, Stephen	
Remember, O Thou Man	[Unknown, sung 2008]	16th century	Ravenscroft, Thomas	
Seinte Marie Moder Milde	1995	13th-century manuscript in the Library of Trinity College, Cambridge	MacMillan, James	
A Spotless Rose is Blowing	2002	14th-century German, translated by Catherine Winkworth	Ledger, Philip	
A Spotless Rose is Blowing	1929	15th-century German, translated by C. Winkworth	Howells, Herbert	
Spring in Winter	2001	Smart, C., from Hymn &c: The Nativity of Our Lord and Saviour Jesus Christ	Woolrich, John	
Starry Night o'er Bethlehem	2004	Willcocks, Anne	Willcocks, David	
Sweet Baby, Sleep! What Ails My Dear? (Wither's Rocking Hymn)	1933	Wither, George	Vaughan Williams, Ralph	
Swetë Jesu	1992	13th century	Maw, Nicholas	
There is No Rose	[Unknown]	15th-century English	Joubert, John	
There is No Rose	2021	15th-century English	McDowall, Cecilia	
The Three Kings	1932	Cornelius, Carl August Peter and Nicolai, P.; translated by H.N. Bate	Cornelius, Carl August Peter; arranged by Ivor Atkins	
The Three Kings	2000	Sayers, Dorothy L., from The Three Kings (1916)	Dove, Jonathan	
Tomorrow Shall Be My Dancing Day	[Unknown]	Traditional English	Gardner, John	
Unto Us is Born a Son	[Unknown, sung 2008]	15th-century Latin, translated by G.R. Woodward	Piae Cantiones (Devout Songs), arranged by David V. Willcocks	
Up Good Christen Folk	1918	Woodward, George Ratcliffe	Piae Cantiones (Devout Songs), arranged by G.R. Woodward	In the first service in 1918, this was the invitatory carol followed by "Once in Royal David's City"
Verbum Caro Factum Est (The Word was Made Flesh)	[Unknown]	John 1:14	Hassler, Leo	
Wassail Carol (Wassail sing we in worship of Christ's Nativity)	1967	[Unknown]	Mathias, William	
What Sweeter Music Can We Bring	1987	Herrick, Robert	Rutter, John	
Winter Solstice Carol	1998	Swayne, Giles (English words); Magnificat antiphon for Christmas Day (Latin words)	Swayne, Giles	
Богородиџе Дево радуйся, Благодатная Марие, Господь с Тобою (Bogoroditse Dyevo – Rejoice, O Virgin Mary, Full of Grace, the Lord is with Thee)	1990	Orthodox Liturgy (in Russian)	Pärt, Arvo	

== See also ==
- Anglican church music
- Christmas carol
