= LeClair Avenue Historic District =

Historic district in Vermont, United States

- U.S. National Register of Historic Places
- U.S. Historic district
- Location within Vermont Location within the United States
- Location: 6, 7, 8, 11, 14 LeClair Ave., 11-13, 12, 20 North St., Winooski, Vermont
- Coordinates: 44°29′39″N 73°11′23″W
- Area: less than one acre
- NRHP reference No.: 11000831
- Added to NRHP: April 2, 2012

The LeClair Avenue Historic District encompasses a small residential development on LeClair Avenue and North Street in Winooski, Vermont. Subdivided and developed by Francis LeClair, a prominent local businessman, the well-preserved working-class residences typify development of the period catering to the area's growing French-Canadian immigrant community. The district was listed on the National Register of Historic Places in 1992.

== Description and history ==
LeClair Avenue is a short dead-end street on the west side of North Street between Union and West Spring Streets, in a residential area northwest of downtown Winooski. The street is lined with a small number of wood-frame and brick single and multi-family residences. Also included in the historic district are several buildings facing North Street, which formed part of the original development of LeClair Street. The buildings were all built between about 1880 and 1905, and are basically vernacular in style, with modest hints of popular architectural styles of the period. Most of the buildings have had some alterations made, from the construction of additions to the replacement of porches and the application of vinyl siding.

Francis LeClair was a successful businessman and real estate developer in Winooski, which was part of Colchester until 1921. The Winooski mills, lining the northern bank of the Winooski River, were a major economic success beginning in the 1860s, drawing French-speaking immigrant workers from neighboring Quebec. LeClair was known in the community for building moderately-priced housing suitable for occupation by the families of mill workers. The LeClair Avenue development was one of the last he began before his death in 1889. He subdivided a large parcel of land about 1880, and sold the smaller parcels off to immigrants or local residents of French-Canadian heritage, who then built on them. Most of the property owners and tenants of the time are described in census records as workers in the area mills.

== See also ==
- National Register of Historic Places listings in Chittenden County, Vermont
