= Porter Screen Company =

- U.S. National Register of Historic Places
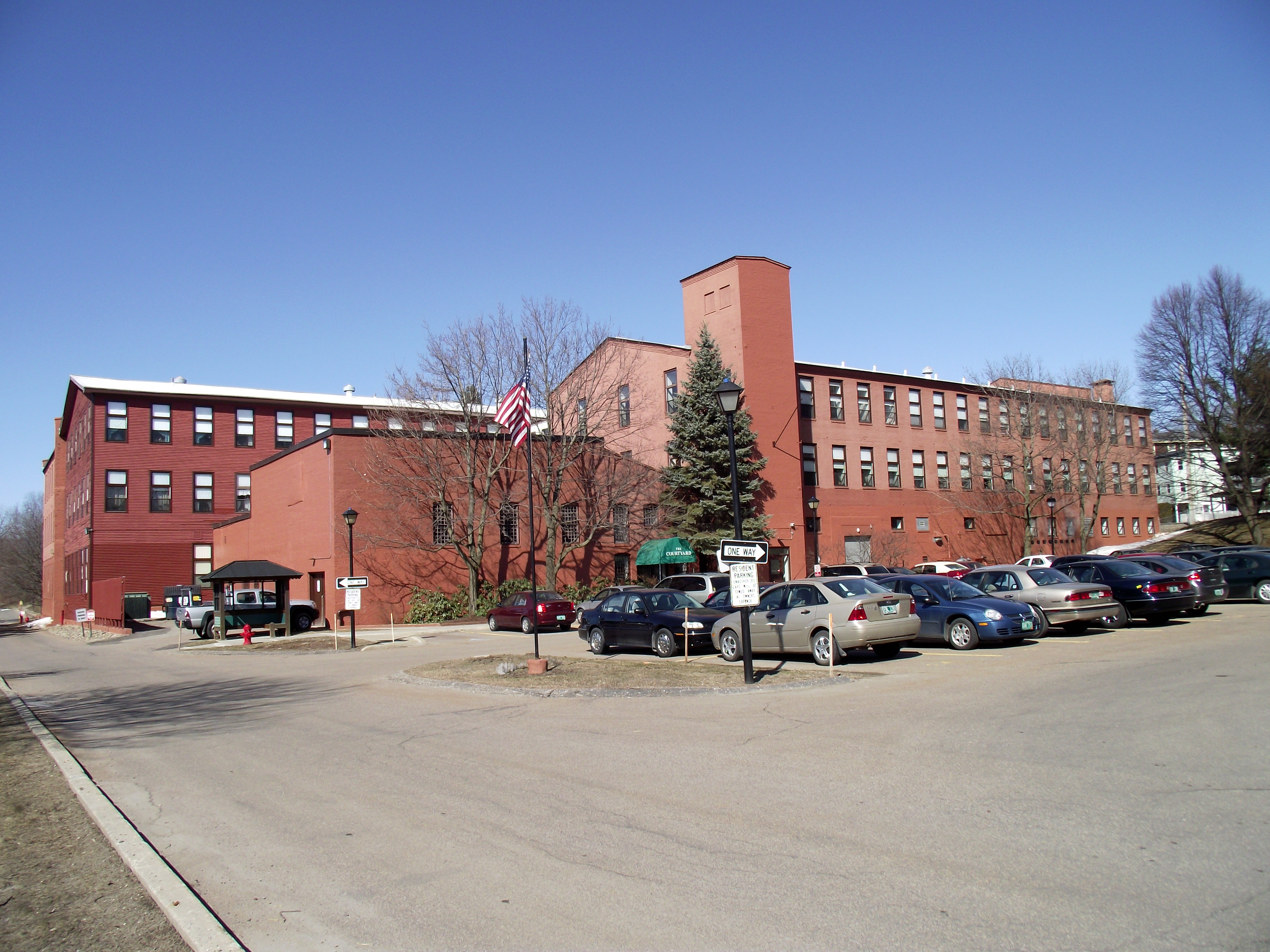

- Location within Vermont Location within the United States
- Location: 110 E. Spring St., Winooski, Vermont
- Coordinates: 44°29′37″N 73°10′54″W
- Area: 4 acres (1.6 ha)
- Built: 1901
- Architectural style: Greek Revival
- NRHP reference No.: 79000219
- Added to NRHP: November 15, 1979

The Porter Screen Company is a historic former industrial facility at 110 East Spring Street in Winooski, Vermont. Developed beginning 1910–11, this mill complex was an important secondary industrial employer in the city, shipping window screens and other housing parts nationwide. The facility, now converted to senior housing, was listed on the National Register of Historic Places in 1979.

== Description and history ==
The former Porter Screen Company mill is located northeast of downtown Winooski, on a triangular parcel of land bounded on the northeast by East Spring Street, and on the south by a railroad right-of-way. The complex consists of a series of interconnected brick and timber-frame buildings, the largest of which are set perpendicular to the railroad and at an angle to the street. The larger elements are either two or three stories in height, with vernacular industrial style, and the largest is clad in novelty siding.

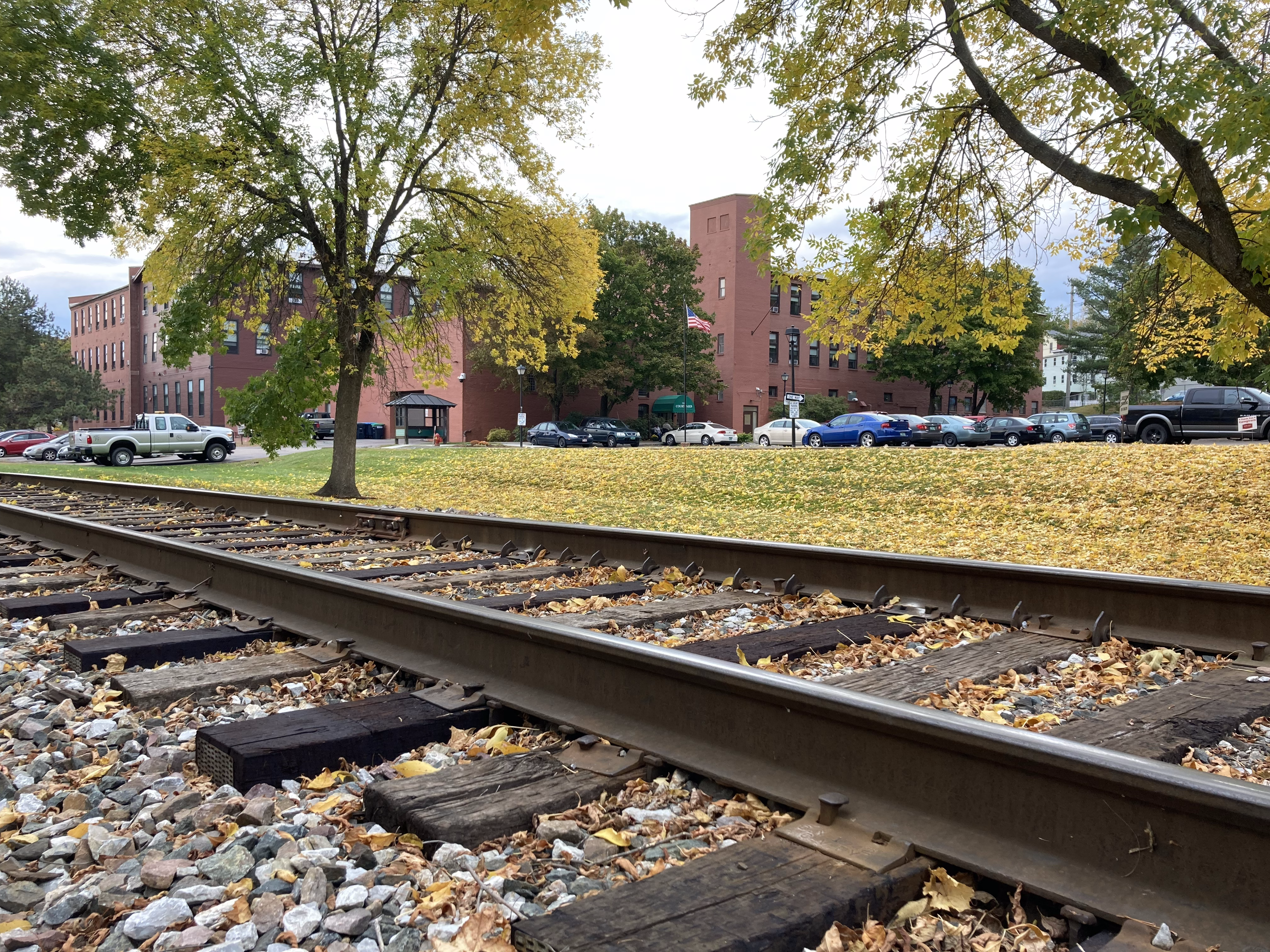
Porter Screen Company from the tracks to the south, October 2020

The Porter Screen Company was founded in 1881 by E.N. Porter of Hardwick, Vermont, and at first established operations in Burlington. In 1893 the company relocated to Winooski, in facilities on Barlow Street that burned in 1900. The present complex of buildings was built by the company, mostly between 1901 and 1910, to house its operations. The company at first produced a variety of architectural parts, including doors, windows, and adjustable window screens with wooden frames. The latter product came to dominate its production, but fell out of favor with respect to the more popular aluminum-framed screens, and the business was closed in 1952. The building complex served for many years as a warehouse, until its conversion into senior housing.

== See also ==
- National Register of Historic Places listings in Chittenden County, Vermont
