= A Ceremony of Carols =

Choral composition

- by Benjamin Britten
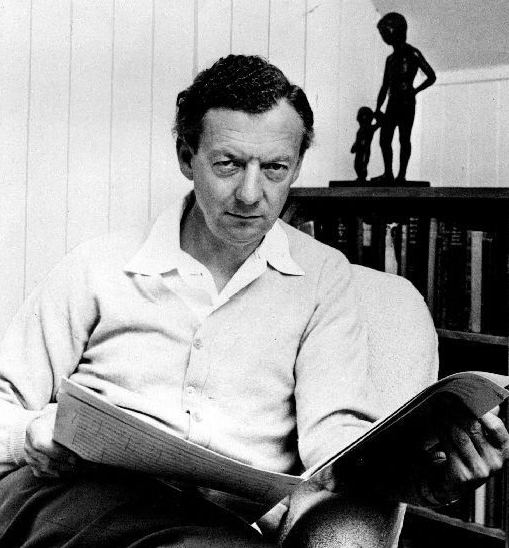
- Benjamin Britten, 1968
- Opus: 28
- Genre: cantata
- Occasion: Christmas
- Text: excerpts from The English Galaxy of Shorter Poems, ed. Gerald Bullett
- Language: Middle English, Early Modern English, Latin
- Composed: 1942
- Movements: 11
- Scoring: Originally for three-part treble chorus, solo voices, and harp. Later arranged for soprano, alto, tenor, bass

A Ceremony of Carols, Op. 28 is an extended choral composition for Christmas by Benjamin Britten scored for three-part treble chorus, solo voices, and harp. The text, structured in eleven movements, is taken from The English Galaxy of Shorter Poems, edited by Gerald Bullett. It is principally in Middle English, with some Latin and Early Modern English. It was composed in 1942 on Britten's sea voyage from the United States to England.

Britten composed the music at the same time as the Hymn to St. Cecilia and in similar style. Originally conceived as a series of unrelated songs, it was later unified into one piece with the framing processional and recessional chant in unison based on the Gregorian antiphon "Hodie Christus natus est". A harp solo based on the chant, along with a few other motifs from "Wolcum Yole", also serves to unify the composition. In addition, the movements "This Little Babe" and "Deo Gracias" have the choir reflecting harp-like effects by employing a canon at the first in stretto.

The original 1942 publication was written for SSA (soprano, soprano, alto) children's choir. In 1943, a SATB (soprano, alto, tenor, bass) arrangement was published for a mixed choir. Many of the movements are written as rounds or call-and-response pieces – lyrically simple for the sake of the children performing. There are three-part divisi in both the tenor and bass parts. Each of these lines individually mirrors a line in either the soprano or alto parts, as though the tenor and bass sections are a men's choir singing the original SSA composition with an SSA choir.

== Movements ==
=== 1. Procession "Hodie Christus natus est" ===
"Hodie Christus natus est" is a Gregorian antiphon to the Magnificat at Second Vespers of Christmas. It is sung exclusively by the sopranos and is patterned on a traditional processional in Christian church service. It has no time signature and can be sung in flexible tempo. The last several measures can be repeated to allow the whole ensemble to take their places.

Text:
Hodie Christus natus est:
hodie Salvator apparuit:
hodie in terra canunt angeli:
laetantur archangeli:
hodie exsultant justi, dicentes:
Gloria in excelsis Deo.
Alleluia!

=== 2. Wolcum Yole! ===
The second movement is an upbeat and festive piece intended to welcome the important days of the coming period: Yule (25th), Saint Stephen's Day (26th), St John's Day (27th), Day of the Innocents (28th), Thomas Becket (29th), New Year, Twelfth Day, Candlemas (2nd Feb). The text is written in Middle English.

Wolcum, Wolcum,
Wolcum be thou hevenè king,
Wolcum Yole!
Wolcum, born in one morning,
Wolcum for whom we sall sing!

Wolcum be ye, Stevene and Jon,
Wolcum, Innocentes every one,
Wolcum, Thomas marter one,
Wolcum be ye, good Newe Yere,
Wolcum, Twelfthe Day both in fere,
Wolcum, seintes lefe and dare,
Wolcum Yole, Wolcum Yole, Wolcum!

Candelmesse, Quene of Bliss,
Wolcum bothe to more and lesse.
Wolcum, Wolcum,
Wolcum be ye that are here, Wolcum Yole,
Wolcum alle and make good cheer.
Wolcum alle another yere,
Wolcum Yole. Wolcum!

=== 3. There is no rose ===
The text of "There is no Rose" is kept at Trinity College (MS 0.3.58) and dates to the early 15th century. It presents a more reverent tone than the previous movement, as the choir admires the beauty of the birth of Jesus. The sopranos and altos sing the melody in a soft, prayerful manner, while the rest of the ensemble occasionally joins them to sing in unison. This is a macaronic piece, meaning the text is in both a vernacular language (English, in this case) and Latin.

There is no rose of such vertu
As is the rose that bare Jesu.
Alleluia, Alleluia,
For in this rose conteinèd was
Heaven and earth in litel space,
Res miranda, Res miranda.

By that rose we may well see
There be one God in persons three,
Pares forma, pares forma.
The aungels sungen the shepherds to:
Gloria in excelsis, gloria in excelsis Deo!
Gaudeamus, gaudeamus.

Leave we all this werldly mirth,
and follow we this joyful birth.
Transeamus, Transeamus, Transeamus.
Alleluia, Res miranda, Pares forma, Gaudeamus,
Transeamus.

=== 4(a). That yongë child ===
"That yongë child" consists of a soprano solo with harp accompaniment. The reverent tone from the previous piece carries over into this one, except this piece is more recitative.

That yongë child when it gan weep
With song she lulled him asleep:
That was so sweet a melody
It passèd alle minstrelsy.

The nightingalë sang also:
Her song is hoarse and nought thereto:
Whoso attendeth to her song
And leaveth the first then doth he wrong.

=== 4(b). Balulalow ===
The text of "Balulalow" is found written by the brothers Wedderburn around 1548. It includes the rest of the ensemble and acts as a contrast to the first part. It has a different keys, rhythm, and an overall more jubilant tone than "That yongë child". "Balulalow" is meant to be a lullaby for the baby Jesus, and the soprano solo at the beginning of the movement paints an image of The Virgin Mary singing a lullaby to her newborn child.

O my deare hert, young Jesu sweit,
Prepare thy creddil in my spreit,
And I sall rock thee to my hert,
And never mair from thee depart.

But I sall praise thee evermoir
with sangës sweit unto thy gloir;
The knees of my hert sall I bow,
And sing that richt Balulalow!

=== 5. "As Dew in Aprille" ===
"As Dew in Aprille" was written by Sloane in the first quarter of the 15th century. It switches the focus from the baby to the Virgin Mary in gentle, soothing music which progressively grows softer until the very end. Throughout this movement, the different voice parts overlap to create an echoing effect. The volume of the choir abruptly shifts at the end from pianissississimo (very, very, very softly) to forte (loudly).

I sing of a maiden
That is makèles:
King of all kings
To her son she ches.

He came al so stille
There his moder was,
As dew in Aprille
That falleth on the grass.

He came al so stille.
To his moder’s bour,
As dew in Aprille
That falleth on the flour.

He came al so stille
There his moder lay,
As dew in Aprille
That falleth on the spray.

Moder and mayden
was never none but she;
Well may such a lady
Goddes mother be.

=== 6. This Little Babe ===
"This Little Babe", using the last four stanzas from Robert Southwell's Newe Heaven, Newe Warre from 1595, contrasts with every other movement, in a darker approach and often using imagery of hell. It depicts a battle between the baby and Satan (good and evil). The "little Babe" has tears as weapons, a "naked breast" instead of a shield, "babish cries" as cannon-balls, "weeping eyes" as arrows, battle flags ("martial ensigns") of Cold and Need, and "feeble flesh" as his warhorse. His camp is a stall in a barn; his crib his defensive trench, a broken wall is his "bulwark", with haystalks as pointed stakes in the ground, and his troops are shepherds. This is conveyed in its swift tempo, polyrhythms, overlapping segments between the voices, and the fact that the song grows progressively louder over the duration of the movement. The music reaches its climax with an intense key change and conflicting rhythm from the rest of the piece.

This little Babe so few days old,
Is come to rifle Satan’s fold;
All hell doth at his presence quake,
Though he himself for cold do shake;
For in this weak unarmèd wise
The gates of hell he will surprise.

With tears he fights and wins the field,
His naked breast stands for a shield;
His battering shot are babish cries,
His arrows looks of weeping eyes,
His martial ensigns Cold and Need,
And feeble Flesh his warrior’s steed.

His camp is pitchèd in a stall,
His bulwark but a broken wall;
The crib his trench, haystalks his stakes;
Of shepherds he his muster [gathering of troops] makes;
And thus, as sure his foe to wound,
The angels’ trumps alarum sound.

My soul, with Christ join thou in fight;
Stick to the tents that he hath pight [pitches].
Within his crib is surest ward;
This little Babe will be thy guard.
If thou wilt foil thy foes with joy;
Then flit not from this heavenly Boy!

=== 7. Interlude ===
This instrumental movement is a harp solo, creating a sense of angelic bliss with its slow tempo, shifting rhythm, and progressively soft nature. Its structure is a fairly faithful reharmonization of the Procession and Recession movement over the Wolcum Yole opening motif, and recast in 12/8 time.

=== 8. In Freezing Winter Night ===
"In Freezing Winter Night" is another text by Southwell. This movement calls out to the circumstances of the birth of Jesus and employs the choir to sing in a round to create an echoing effect. The choir and harp progress through the movement at contrasting paces and, over the duration of the piece, gradually synchronize until they both move at the same pace just before the ending when the music fades out. This is meant to symbolize the discord on earth before and during the birth of Christ and the hope of the future and the harmony he brings.

Behold, a silly tender babe,
in freezing winter night,
In homely manger trembling lies
Alas, a piteous sight!

The inns are full; no man will yield
This little pilgrim bed.
But forced he is with silly beasts
In crib to shroud his head.

This stable is a Prince’s court,
This crib his chair of State;
The beasts are parcel of his pomp,
The wooden dish his plate.

The persons in that poor attire
His royal liveries wear;
The Prince himself is come from heav’n;
This pomp is prizèd there.

With joy approach, O Christian wight,
Do homage to thy King,
And highly praise his humble pomp,
wich he from Heav’n doth bring.

=== 9. Spring Carol ===
"Spring Carol" is on a text which was also set by William Cornysh in the 16th century. Britten set it as a duet between two sopranos that depicts the signs of spring. This movement ends with a call to thank God, which transitions appropriately to the next movement.

Pleasure it is to hear iwis the Birdès sing,
The deer in the dale, the sheep in the vale,
the corn springing.

God’s purvayance For sustenance.
It is for man.

Then we always to him give praise,
And thank him than.

=== 10. Deo gracias – Adam lay i-bounden ===
"Deo gracias" (Thanks be to God) is based on a macaronic poem from the 15th century. "Adam lay i-bounden" tells of the events that happened in Chapter 3 of Genesis, the "Fall of Man" as Eve is tricked into eating the fruit of sin. Note the idea of Adam's sin as a 'happy fault,' emphasized by the last stanza - "Blessèd be the time That appil takè was" - introduced by St. Ambrose and St. Augustine and further developed by Thomas Aquinas in the thirteenth century. At the end of the piece, a cross can be displayed in the text to signify the crucifixion of Christ as well as the redemption of mankind. Britten has set the choir in such a way that the choir becomes emphatic in its thanks to God. Use of syncopated (emphasis of the off-beat to create a displacement of rhythm) and staccato (short and detached) rhythms emphasise this energetic thankfulness, while only a small section very quietly recounts the plight of humanity. The harp and choir both gradually grow more resounding until the very last chord.

Deo gracias! Deo gracias!
Adam lay i-bounden, bounden in a bond;
Four thousand winter thought he not too long.

Deo gracias! Deo gracias!
And all was for an appil, an appil that he tok,
As clerkès finden written in their book.

Deo gracias! Deo gracias!
Ne had the appil takè ben, the appil takè ben
Ne haddè never our lady a ben hevenè quene.

Blessèd be the time that appil takè was.
Therefore we moun singen.
Deo gracias!

=== 11. "Recession" ("Hodie Christus natus est") ===
This movement is a near mirror of the Procession and the ensemble, typically, performs this piece as they exit the stage. Its melody gradually fades as the ensemble retreats outside of the venue.

Hodie Christus natus est,
hodie Salvator apparuit,
hodie in terra canunt angeli,
laetantur archangeli:
hodie exsultant justi, dicentes:
Gloria in excelsis Deo.
Alleluia!

== Discography ==
Recordings of the complete work include:

- RCA Victor Chorale of women's voices, Robert Shaw conductor, Laura Newell harpist (1952)
- Choir of St John's College, Cambridge, George Guest, Marisa Robles (1965)
- Choir of King's College, Cambridge, David Willcocks, Osian Ellis (1972)
- Texas Boys Choir, George Bragg, director (1973)
- Wandsworth School Boys' Choir (1972), Susan Drake harpist
- Christ Church Cathedral Choir, Oxford (1982)
- Westminster Cathedral Choir (1986)
- New London Children's Choir (1995), Ronald Corp, Skaila Kanga (harp)
- Cincinnati Boychoir (1996)
- Robert Shaw Chamber Singers (1997)
- College of Notre Dame of Maryland (now Notre Dame of Maryland University) women’s concert choir (1999)
- Australian Boys Choir (2013)
- Choir of New College, Oxford, Edward Higginbottom (2013)
- Czech Philharmonic Children's Choir (2017)
- Mädchenchor Hannover (2015)
