= Winooski Block =

- U.S. National Register of Historic Places
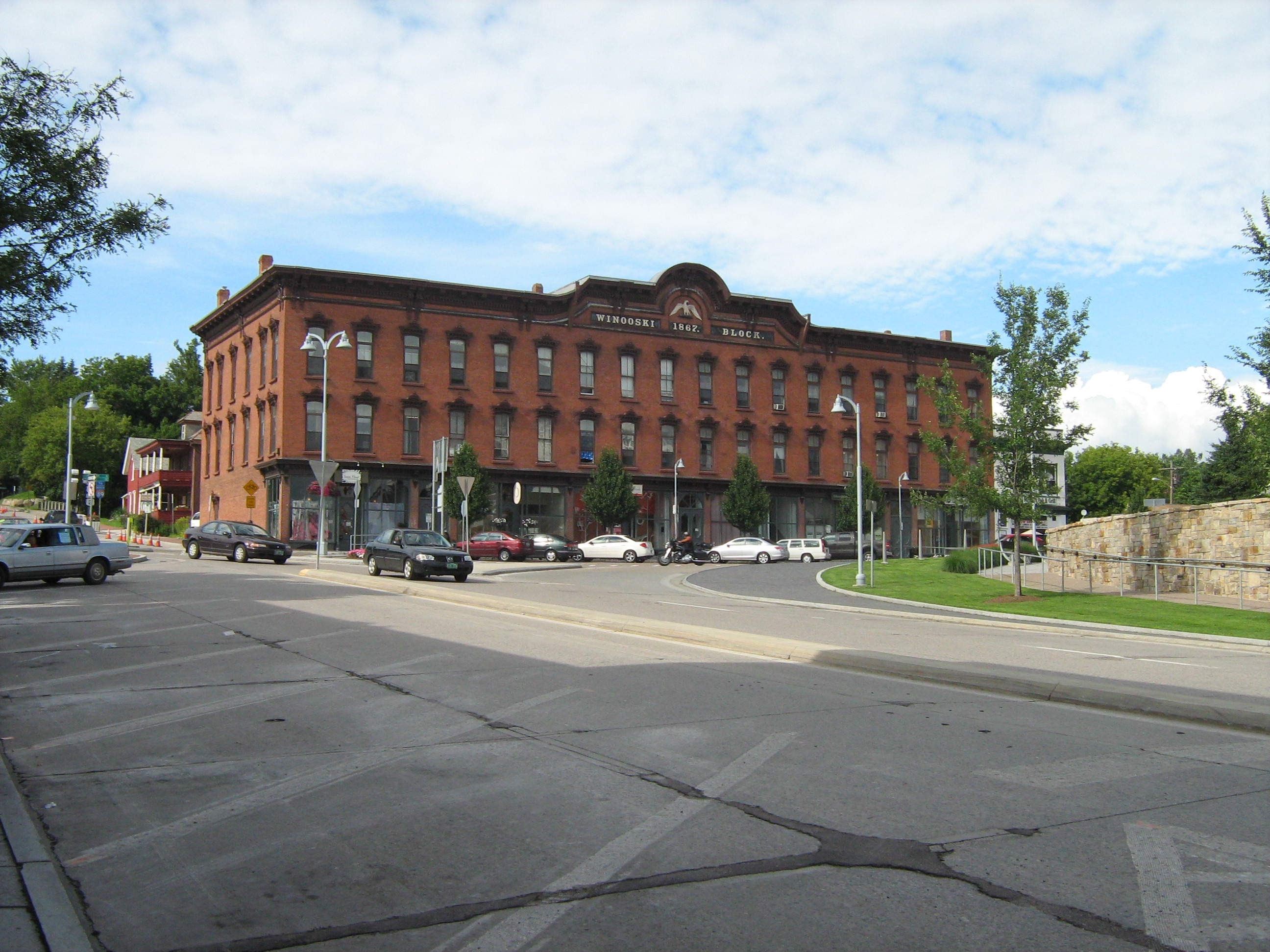

- Location within Vermont Location within the United States
- Location: E. Allen and Main Sts., Winooski, Vermont
- Coordinates: 44°29′30″N 73°11′11″W
- Area: less than one acre
- Built: 1867
- Architect: Thayer, Warren
- NRHP reference No.: 74000210
- Added to NRHP: November 20, 1974

The Winooski Block is a historic commercial building at 1 through 17 East Allen Street (corner of Main Street) in downtown Winooski, Vermont. Built in 1867, it is the only major building to survive the city's urban renewal activities of the 1970s, and is a fine example of post-Civil War commercial architecture. It was listed on the National Register of Historic Places in 1974.

== Description and history ==
The Winooski Block is prominently situated in downtown Winooski, on the north side of East Allen Street facing Rotary Park to the south. It occupies most of a city block bounded by East Allen and Main Streets, and Newell's and Weaver Lanes. It is three stories in height, eighteen window bays wide and six deep, and is built out of red brick. It is covered by a flat roof with an elaborate projecting cornice. Windows on the upper floors are set in rectangular openings with cast iron sills and lintel caps. The ground floor storefronts have largely been modernized, although some period details remain.

The block was built in 1867, during a post-Civil War building boom in the city. It was designed by Warren Thayer, an architect based in Burlington, for three merchants whose retail establishments occupied its ground floor. The third floor housed a large meeting space that was used for a variety of social purposes, including religious services, musical groups, and film screenings. Currently, there are 24 apartments in the block, with eight each (four on each floor) in the addresses of 3, 11 and 15.

== See also ==
- National Register of Historic Places listings in Chittenden County, Vermont
