= Capitol Hill Chorale =

Choir in the Washington, DC, US area

- Also known as: CHC
- Origin: Washington, D.C., United States
- Genres: Choral, Classical
- Occupation: Choir
- Instrument: ~100 voices
- Years active: 1993–present
- Members: Artistic Director; Frederick Binkholder Accompanist; Raymond Rinaldo President; Samuel Holliday
- Website: Official Website

The Capitol Hill Chorale is a 100-voice volunteer mixed choir with members throughout the Capitol Hill and Washington, D.C., metropolitan area. Founded in 1993, the Chorale performs a principally classical repertoire with an emphasis on Eastern European liturgical works and early American song.

In 2010, the chorale performed Zakaria Paliashvili's Liturgy of St. John Chrysostom. The Liturgy, though written by a major Georgian composer, was suppressed under both the Tsarist and Soviet governments and largely lost. Its performance by the Capitol Hill Chorale was likely the first since the Bolshevik Revolution as well as its North American premiere, and this prompted Georgian Ambassador to the United States Batu Kutelia to invite the Chorale to perform the piece in Tbilisi.

In 2014, the Chorale appointed Massachusetts-based choral composer Kevin Siegfried its first composer-in-residence. This collaboration resulted in several new works drawing on the American tradition, including settings of traditional Shaker songs and Sioux texts.

In 2019, the Chorale toured to Tbilisi and Kutaisi, Georgia, performing Paliashvili's masterwork Liturgy along with a program of American music.
