= Methodist Episcopal Church of Winooski =

Historic church in Vermont, United States

- U.S. National Register of Historic Places
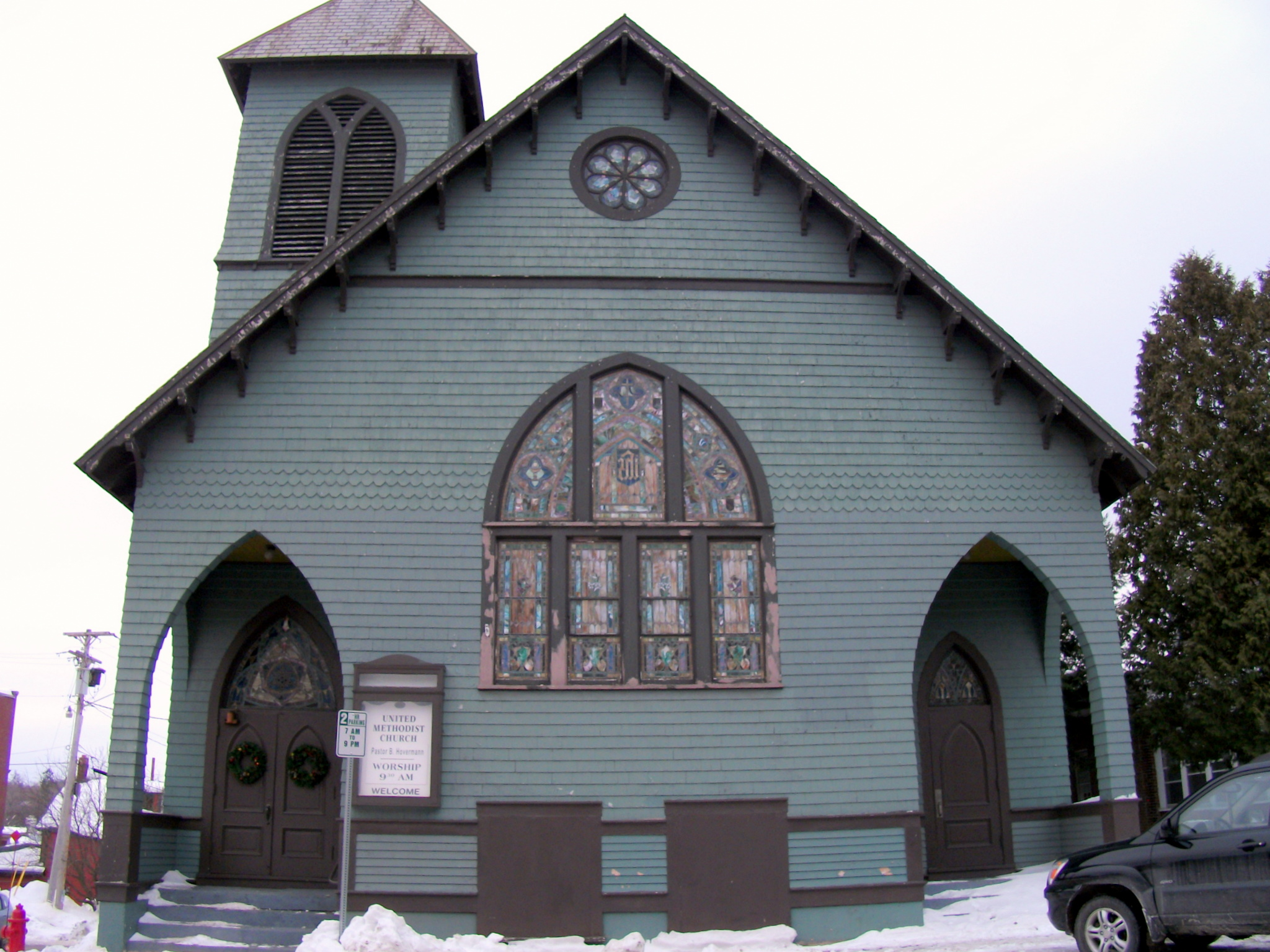
- Winooski United Methodist Church, February 2011

- Location within Vermont Location within the United States
- Location: 24 W Allen St., Winooski, Vermont
- Coordinates: 44°29′28″N 73°11′16″W
- Area: less than one acre
- Built: 1918
- Architectural style: Carpenter Gothic
- MPS: Religious Buildings, Sites and Structures in Vermont MPS
- NRHP reference No.: 01000216
- Added to NRHP: March 2, 2001

The Methodist Episcopal Church of Winooski, also known as the Winooski United Methodist Church, is a historic Methodist church building located at 24 West Allen Street in Winooski, Vermont, United States. It was built in 1918, and is a significant local example of vernacular Carpenter Gothic architecture. On March 2, 2001, it was added to the National Register of Historic Places.

== Architecture and history ==
The Winooski United Methodist Church stands in downtown Winooski, at the southwest corner of West Allen and Follett Streets. It is a large, single-story wood-frame structure, with a gabled roof. Its exterior is clad in a combination of wooden clapboards and shingles, some of the latter cut in decorative patterns. A square tower rises through the left side of the roof, with tripart louvered openings in the belfry stage and a truncated hip roof at the top. The main facade is roughly symmetrical, with recessed lancet-arched porches at the corners and a large lancet stained-glass window at the center. The left porch houses the main entrance, which is a double door topped by a lancet stained-glass window, while the right porch houses a smaller secondary entrance.

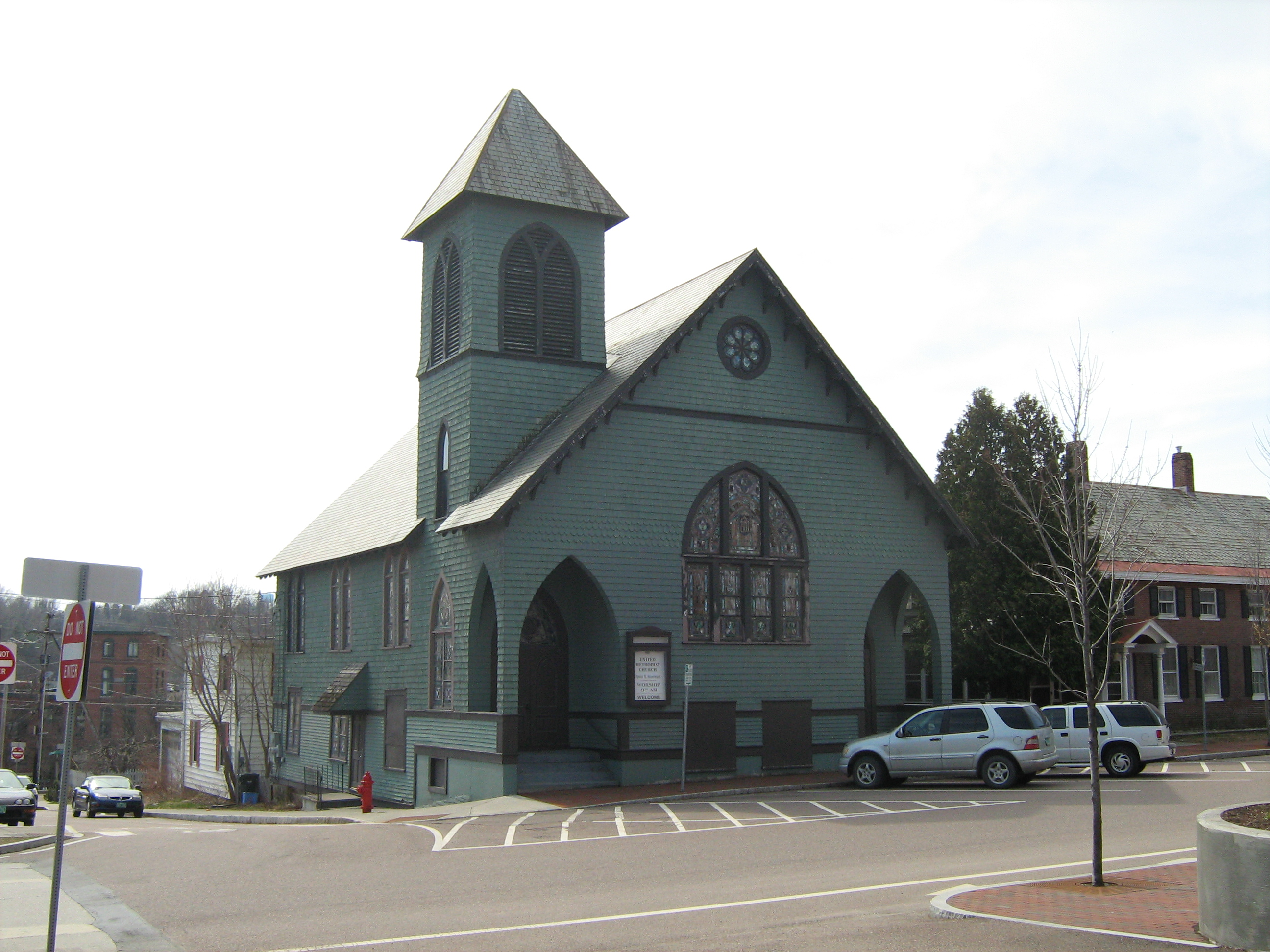
Winooski United Methodist Church, April 2010

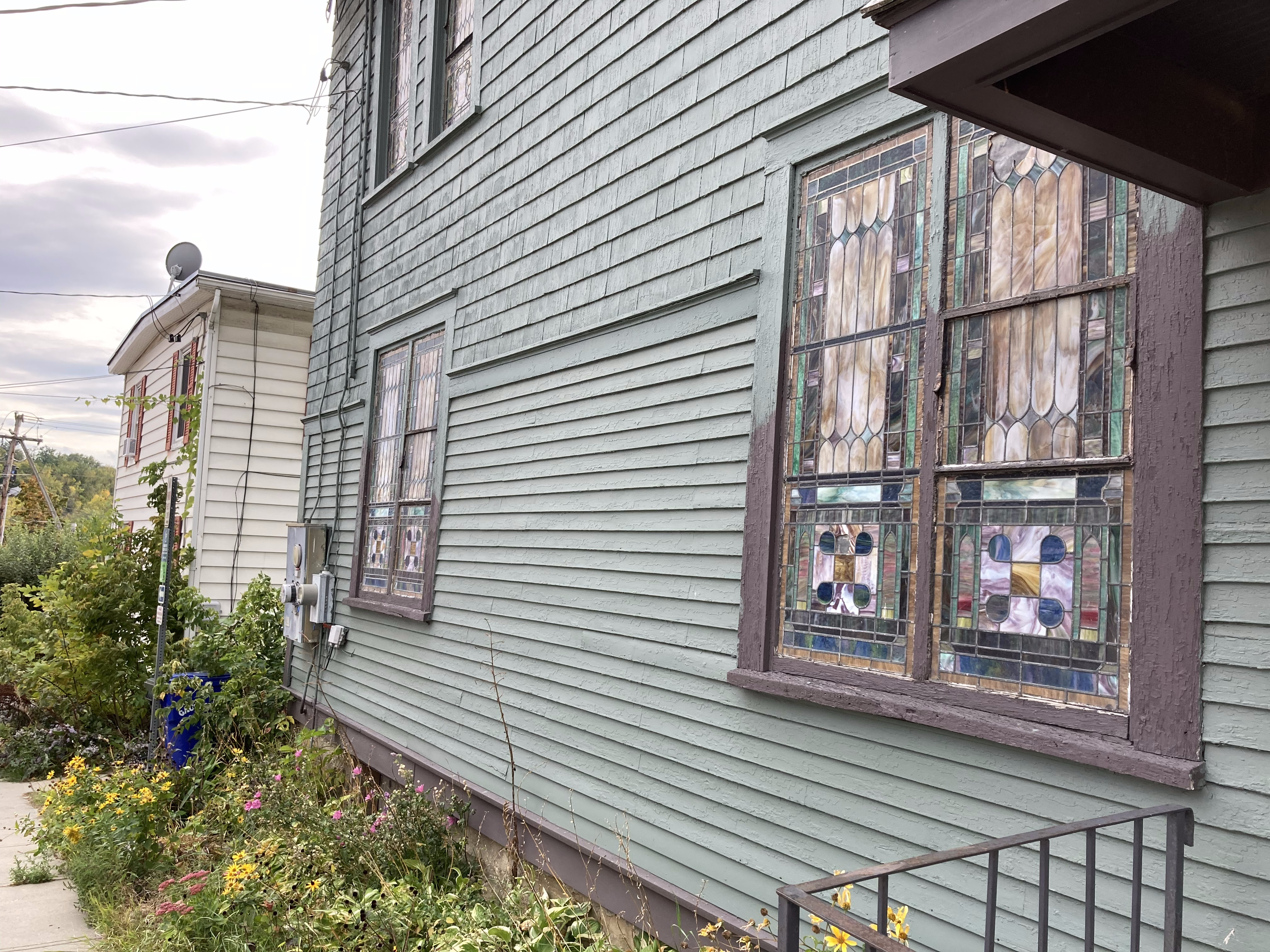
Stained glass windows, October 2020

Winooski's Methodist congregation was formally organized in 1847, having been affiliated with the church's Burlington chapter since early Methodist preaching began in the area in the 1830s. The congregation had by 1860 raised sufficient funds for a church, which was built on the present site. That church burned down in 1917, and the present church was built the following year.

== See also ==
- National Register of Historic Places listings in Chittenden County, Vermont
