= Adam lay ybounden =

15th-century English Christian text

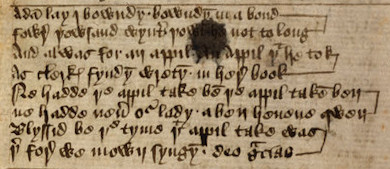
Single surviving manuscript source of "Adam lay ybounden" in Sloane MS 2593 held by the British Library.

"Adam lay ybounden", originally titled "Adam lay i-bowndyn", is a 15th-century English Christian text of unknown authorship. It takes as its theme the Fall of Man, as described in the Book of Genesis.

Originally a song text, no contemporary musical settings survive, although there are many notable modern choral settings of the text, such as that by Benjamin Britten (A Ceremony of Carols) and Boris Ord.

== Origins ==
The manuscript in which the poem is found (Sloane MS 2593, ff. 10v-11) is held by the British Library, which dates the work to c.1400 and speculates that the lyrics may have belonged to a wandering minstrel. Other poems included on the same page in the manuscript include "I have a gentil cok", the famous lyric poem "I syng of a mayden" and two riddle songs – "A minstrel's begging song" and "I have a yong suster".

Analysis of their dialect by K.R. Palti (2008) places them within the song tradition of East Anglia and more specifically Norfolk; two further carol manuscripts from the county contain songs from Sloane MS 2593. The texts of the songs were first printed by Victorian antiquarian Thomas Wright in 1836, who speculated that a number of the songs were intended for use in mystery plays.

== Analysis ==
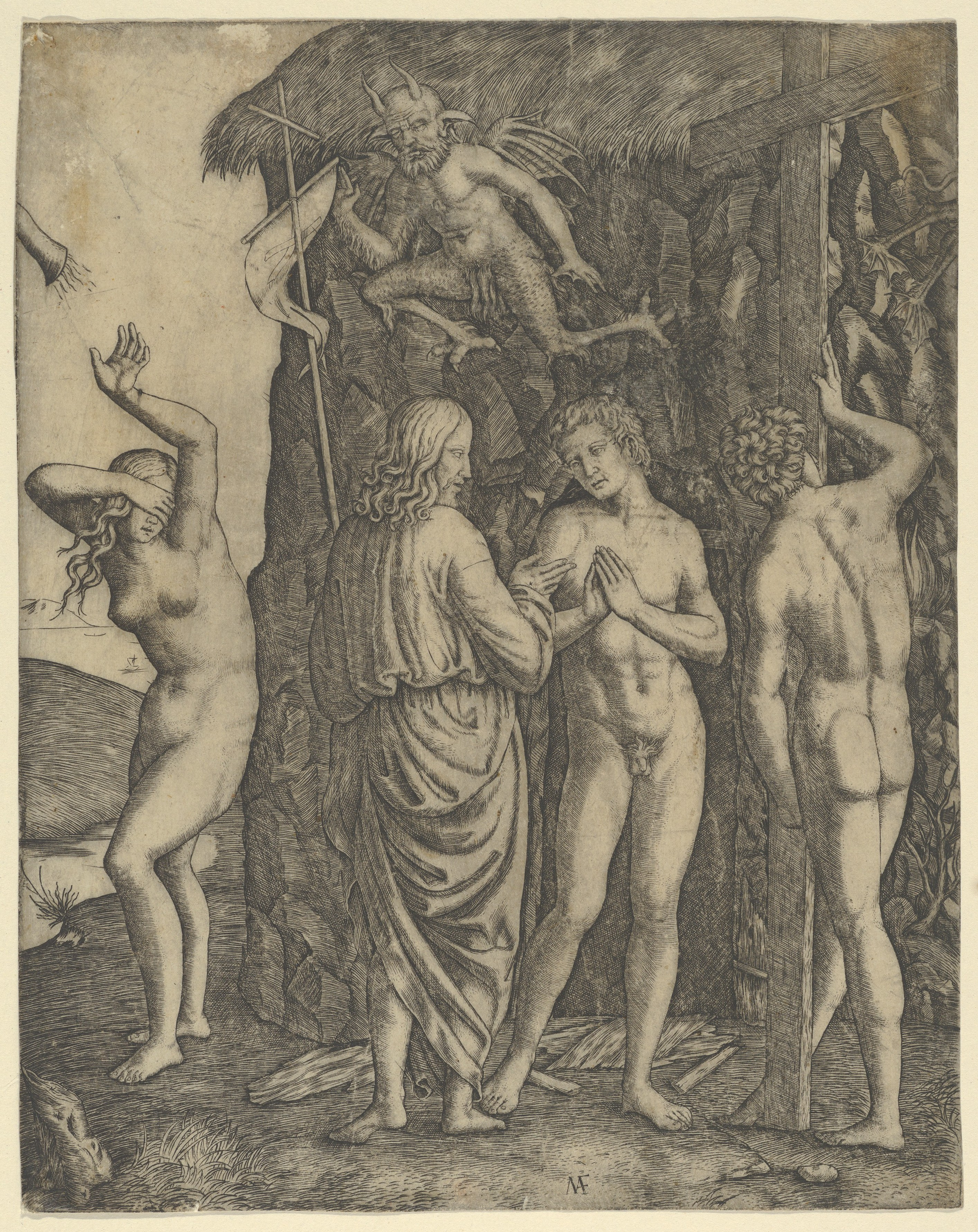
The text relates a medieval idea that Adam was imprisoned in Limbo until the Harrowing of Hell released his soul

Adam lay ybounden relates the events of Genesis, Chapter 3. In medieval theology, Adam was supposed to have remained in bonds with the other patriarchs in the limbus patrum from the time of his death until the crucifixion of Christ (the "4000 winters"). The second verse narrates the Fall of Man following Adam's temptation by Eve and the serpent. John Speirs suggests that there is a tone of astonishment, almost incredulity in the phrase "and all was for an apple", noting "an apple, such as a boy might steal from an orchard, seems such a little thing to produce such overwhelming consequences. Yet so it must be because clerks say so. It is in their book (probably meaning the Vulgate itself)."

The third verse suggests the subsequent redemption of man by the birth of Jesus Christ by Mary, who was to become the Queen of Heaven as a result, and thus the song concludes on a positive note hinting at Thomas Aquinas' concept of the "felix culpa" (blessed fault). Paul Morris suggests that the text's evocation of Genesis implies a "fall upwards". Speirs suggests that the lyric retells the story in a particularly human way: "The doctrine of the song is perfectly orthodox...but here is expressed very individually and humanly. The movement of the song reproduces very surely the movements of a human mind."

== Text ==
Middle English original spelling	Middle English converted (Edith Rickert)
Adam lay i-bowndyn, bowndyn in a bond, Fowre thowsand wynter thowt he not to long;	Adam lay ybounden, Bounden in a bond; Four thousand winter Thought he not too long.
And al was for an appil, an appil that he tok, As clerkes fyndyn wretyn in here book.	And all was for an apple, An apple that he took. As clerkës finden written In their book.
Ne hadde the appil take ben, the appil taken ben, Ne hadde never our lady a ben hevene quen.	Nor had one apple taken been, The apple taken been, Then had never Our Lady, A-been heaven's queen.
Blyssid be the tyme that appil take was! Therfore we mown syngyn Deo gratias.	Blessed be the time That apple taken was! Therefore we may singen Deo gratias!

== Settings ==
Peter Warlock version (Vallejo Drive Christmas Concert, December 18, 2010)

The text was originally meant to be a song text, although no music survives. However, there are many notable modern choral settings of the text, with diverse interpretations by composers such as Peter Warlock, John Ireland, Boris Ord, Philip Ledger, Howard Skempton and Benjamin Britten (titled Deo Gracias in his Ceremony of Carols). A new setting by Giles Swayne was commissioned for and first performed in 2009 by the Choir of St John's College, Cambridge and their annual broadcast of the Advent carol service on BBC Radio 3. The Connecticut composer Robert Edward Smith wrote a setting of the text that was premiered in December 2018 in Hartford at Trinity College's annual Lessons and Carols. The piece featured the College's Chapel Singers, directed by Christopher Houlihan.

=== Boris Ord ===
Boris Ord's 1957 setting is probably the best-known version as a result of its traditional performance following the First Lesson at the annual Festival of Nine Lessons and Carols at the chapel of King's College, Cambridge, where Ord was organist from 1929 to 1957.

== See also ==
- List of Christmas carols
