= I syng of a mayden =

Middle English lyric poem or carol

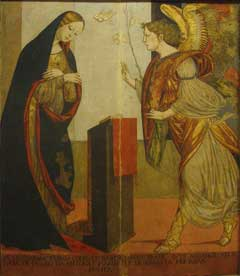
The Annunciation depicted by Bernardino di Mariotto, c.1514

"I syng of a mayden" (sometimes titled "As Dewe in Aprille") is a Middle English lyric poem or carol of the 15th century celebrating the Annunciation and the Virgin Birth of Jesus. It has been described as one of the most admired short vernacular English poems of the late Middle Ages.

Written by an anonymous hand, the text is now only to be found in British Library Sloane MS 2593, a collection of medieval lyrics now held in the British Library, although contemporary sources suggest it was well known in its day. Originally intended to be sung, no evidence of the work's musical setting survives, and since its rediscovery and popularisation it has formed the basis for a number of modern choral and vocal works.

== Analysis ==
The work has been described by Laura Saetveit Miles, a University of Bergen Professor of medieval literature, as "one of the most admired fifteenth-century Middle English lyrics [which] offers, within a deceptively simple form, an extremely delicate and haunting presentation of Mary (the 'mayden / þat is makeles') and her conception of Christ ('here sone')". Primarily, the text celebrates the Annunciation of Mary as described in Luke 1:26, but also widely references concepts from the Old Testament. Michael Steffes of University of Wisconsin–Stevens Point notes that "'I syng of a mayden' is a very quiet and very beautiful meditation on the inward aspects of the Annunciation, on the immediate consequences of Mary's acceptance of Gabriel's message." The concept of the choice of Mary is an important subtlety in the text. Derek Pearsall writes:

A brain and a subtle ear has gone into the making of this poem...celebrating the mystery of Christ's conception. Dew falling on grass, flower and spray (traditional imagery, deriving from OT texts such as Psalm 72:6) suggests ease, grace and delicacy generally (not progressive stages of insemination). The emphasis on Mary's freedom of choice, at the moment of the annunciation, is theologically strictly proper.

According to Miles, despite a celebratory opening, "Mary's physical stillness as proof of her virginity remains the poet's priority." As a result, the poet repeats the phrase "He cam also stylle" in three of the five verses. "Stylle" had several implications – the stillness of the conception of Mary and of the birth of Jesus Christ.

The poem is written from a first person point of view, and contains five quatrains. Below is the text in both its original Middle English, with spelling intact, and a modern translation.

Middle English original	English modernisation
I syng of a mayden þat is makeles, kyng of alle kynges to here sone che ches.	I sing of a maiden That is immaculate, King of all kings For her son she chose.
He came also stylle þer his moder was as dew in aprylle, þat fallyt on þe gras.	He came as still Where his mother was As dew in April; That falls on the grass.
He cam also stylle to his moderes bowr as dew in aprille, þat fallyt on þe flour.	He came as still To his mother's bower As dew in April; That falls on the flower.
He cam also stylle þer his moder lay as dew in Aprille, þat fallyt on þe spray.	He came as still Where his mother lay As dew in April; That falls on the spray.
Moder & mayden was neuer non but che – wel may swych a lady Godes moder be.	Mother and maiden There was never, ever one but she; Well may such a lady God's mother be.

== Origin ==
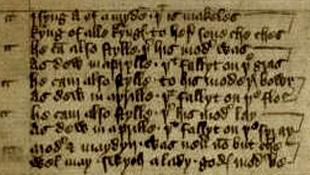
Single surviving manuscript source of "I syng of a mayden" in Sloane MS 2593. Note how the two-verse structure in the manuscript differs from most transcribed versions.

The manuscript in which the poem is found, (Sloane MS 2593, ff.10v-11) is held by the British Library, who date the work to c.1400 and speculate that the lyrics may have belonged to a wandering minstrel; other poems included in the manuscript include "I have a gentil cok", "Adam lay i-bowndyn" and two riddle songs – "A minstrel's begging song" and "I have a yong suster". The Chaucer scholar Joseph Glaser notes that 2593 contains the only surviving copies of several "indispensable" poems. These include the aforementioned poem "Adam lay i-bowndyn", "A Babe is born al of a may", "Benedicamus Domino" and "Lullay, myn lykyng".

In 1836, Thomas Wright suggested that, although his fellow antiquarian Joseph Ritson had dated the manuscript from the reign of Henry V of England (1387–1422), he personally felt that although "its greatest antiquity must be included within the fifteenth century", some lyrics contained within may be of an earlier origin. Wright speculated, on the basis of the dialect of Middle English, that the lyrics probably originated in Warwickshire, and suggested that a number of the songs were intended for use in mystery plays. More recent analysis of the manuscript places the dialect as being of East Anglian origin and more specifically Norfolk; two further carol MSS from the county contain duplicates from Sloane MS 2593. However, "I syng of a mayden" is a unique instance of this lyric.

Although the Sloane Manuscript is the only surviving textual source, the bibliographer and Shakespearean scholar W. W. Greg proposed that the poem's similarity to a much earlier 13th-century poem held at Trinity College, Cambridge (MS. B. 13. 49) was unlikely to be accidental. Alan J. Fletcher, a specialist in Latin liturgical drama and the late Middle Ages, noted in 1978 that a set of contemporary sermons compiled by a writer called Selk (Bodleian MS Barlow 24) quote the final phrases of the poem in such a way to suggest the poem was more widely disseminated and known in its time:

Mayde, Wyff and Moder whas neure but ye
Wel may swych a ladye Goddys modyr be.

== Musical setting ==
As most explicitly noted by the first quatrain, the poem was originally intended to be sung. Indeed, as noted by Stephen Medcalf, Emeritus Reader in English at the University of Sussex, the text itself seems to imply melody and verse. However, due to the oral tradition of the time, the original melody of the song was not notated and over the course of time was forgotten.

Since the rediscovery of the text, many composers have set the text to music, amongst them diverse choral or vocal interpretations by Martin Shaw, Patrick Hadley, Roger Quilter, John Gerrish, Gustav Holst, Arnold Bax Peter Warlock, R. R. Terry, Lennox Berkeley, Benjamin Britten ("As Dewe in Aprille" in his Ceremony of Carols), Mario Castelnuovo-Tedesco, Ronald Corp (1975), Philip Lawson a setting published by Walton Music, John Adams (as the chorus "I Sing of a Maiden" in his opera-oratorio El Niño), and Bob Chilcott (in his Salisbury Vespers). The work is also regularly performed by the Mediæval Bæbes. The setting composed by Miklós Rózsa is also included in the 1953 Knights of the Round Table film score.

== See also ==
- List of Christmas carols
