= Winooski, Vermont =

City in Vermont, United States

- City
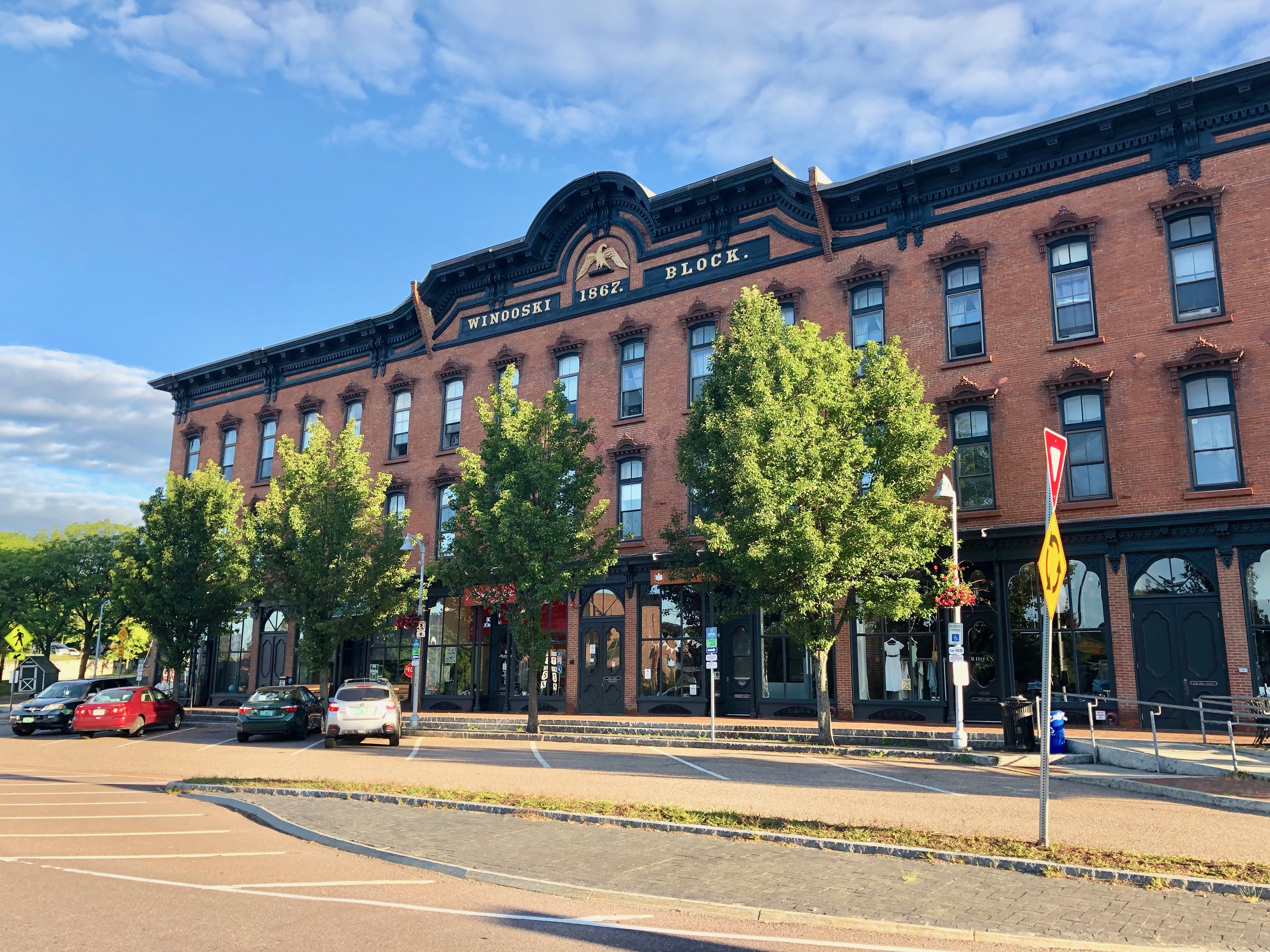
- The Winooski Block (1867) in downtown Winooski

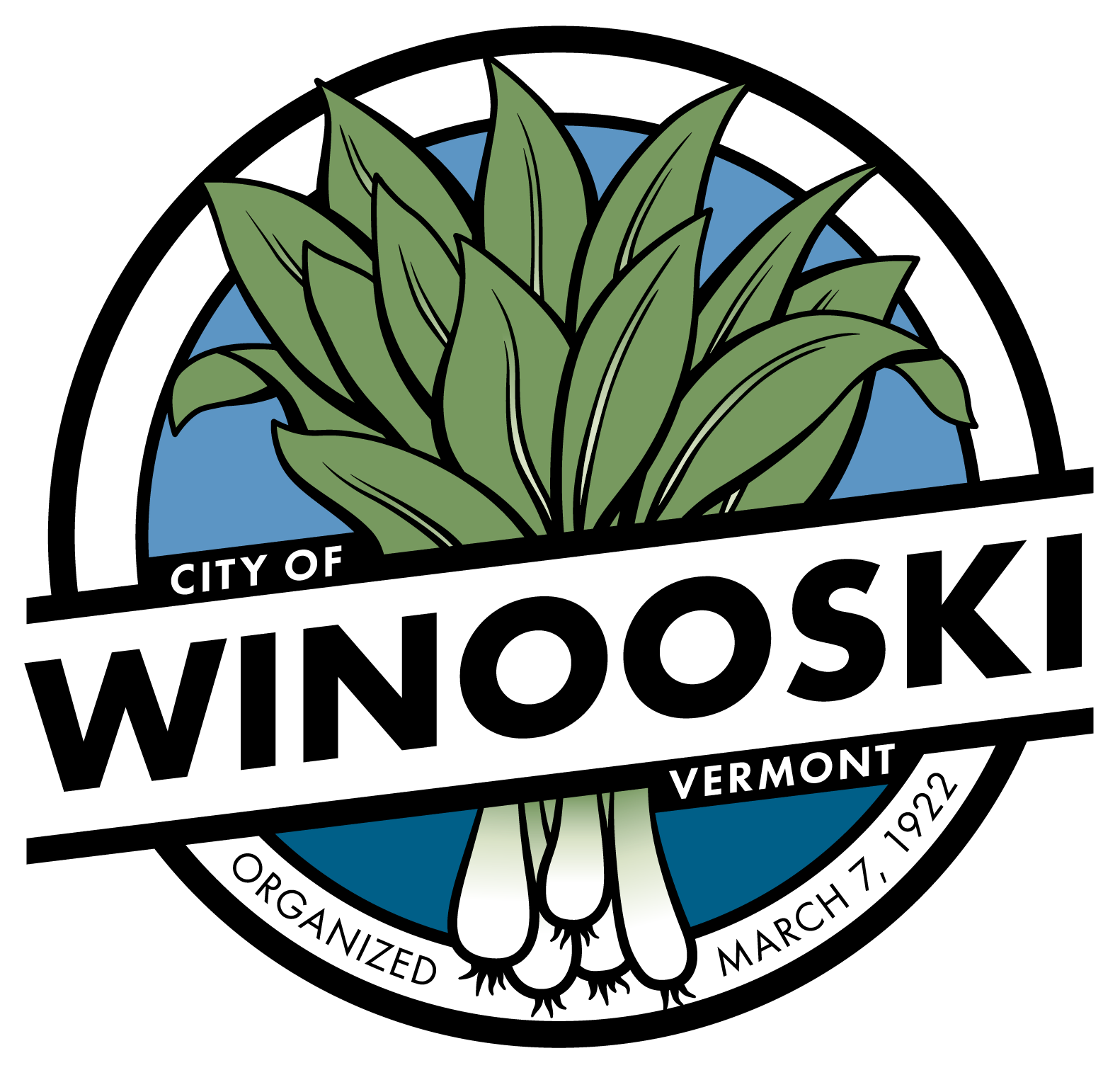
- Seal
- Nickname: Onion City
- Location in Chittenden County and the state of Vermont
- Coordinates: 44°29′53″N 73°11′08″W
- Country: United States
- State: Vermont
- County: Chittenden

Area
  - Total: 1.51 sq mi (3.92 km^{2})
  - Land: 1.43 sq mi (3.71 km^{2})
  - Water: 0.081 sq mi (0.21 km^{2})
- Elevation: 249 ft (76 m)

Population (2020)
  - Total: 7,997
  - Density: 5,582.8/sq mi (2,155.52/km^{2})
- Time zone: UTC−5 (Eastern (EST))
  - Summer (DST): UTC−4 (EDT)
- ZIP code: 05404
- Area code: 802
- FIPS code: 50-85150
- GNIS feature ID: 1462268
- Website: Winooski, VT Official City Website

Winooski /wɪˈnuːski/ is a city in Chittenden County, Vermont, United States. Located on the Winooski River, as of the 2020 U.S. census the municipal population was 7,997. The city is the most densely populated municipality in northern New England, an area comprising the states of Maine, New Hampshire, and Vermont. It is the smallest of Vermont's 10 cities by area, though the city of Vergennes has the smallest population. As part of the Burlington metropolitan area, Vermont, it is bordered by Burlington, Colchester, and South Burlington.

== Geography ==
According to the United States Census Bureau, the city has a total area of 1.5 square miles (3.9 km^{2}), of which 0.1 sq mi (0.2 km^{2}) (5.30%) is covered by water.

=== Etymology ===
As early as 750 CE, the Abenaki tribe lived along the shores of a cascading waterfall in a fertile river valley they called Winoskitegw, meaning “land of the wild onion". Winooski's southern border is formed by the Winooski River, which is alternatively known as the Onion River.

== History ==
=== Pre-Columbian ===
About 5000 years ago, a single family of Paleolithic Native Americans came to what is now the city. The prehistoric campground for this transient group is one of Vermont's significant archaeological sites. Other native people came to Winooski in the years that followed.

=== Colonial ===
Situated on a main road, Winooski most likely started as a rest stop for travelers. With a set of waterfalls to assist the growth of industry, however, it soon also became a center for wool processing.

In the early 1770s, Ira Allen constructed a blockhouse on the Winooski (then "Onion") River, which served both as a fort and as general store and office for the land-speculating Onion River Company. Fort Frederick was never used for defense, but its presence increased the value of Onion River property and promoted settlement.

=== Post-colonial ===
After the Revolutionary War, Ira Allen built a dam across the river with a sawmill at each end.

In the late 1830s, the Burlington Mill Company used the river's power for the manufacture of yarns and cloth.

In 1846, James and Lucinda Stone from Winooski settled in Sheboygan County in the Wisconsin Territory and named their new settlement Winooski, Wisconsin.

=== Modern times ===
Textile mill in Winooski, 1937

The American Woolen Company purchased the failing Burlington Mills in 1901, restoring a measure of economic growth to the area. This success eventually led Winooski to incorporate as a city in 1922, breaking away from the town of Colchester.

The mills closed in 1954, resulting in two decades of economic problems for the city. In the 1980s, two old mills were converted into commercial, office, and apartment space, helping to revitalize the area.

In 1979, the city researched the construction of a dome over the entire city of Winooski, to reduce heating costs during the winter. The proposed dome would have been 200 feet (61 m) at the center, and internal combustion engines would have been banned. Though the dome was never built, in 2009 the city's planner defended the concept, insisting, "Economically, it's a slam dunk," and adding, "You could have had year-round fly-fishing."

In 2008, the city dismissed their city manager of 11 months, while he was still an at-will employee. His contract had been scheduled for three years.

== Government ==
The current mayor of the city is Thomas Renner, who is Vermont's first black mayor. He was appointed, and subsequently elected, mayor of the city after the previous mayor, Kristine Lott, stepped down.

Kristine Lott was the first elected female mayor in Winooski's history.

| Position | Name | Party | First elected |
|---|---|---|---|
| Mayor | Thomas Renner | Democratic | 2025 (appointed) |
| Deputy Mayor | None | | |
| Manager | Elaine Wang | Independent | 2021 (appointed) |
| Councillor | Bryn Oakleaf | Democratic | 2021 |
| Councillor | Aurora Hurd | Democratic | 2022 |
| Councillor | Charles Judge | Democratic | 2023 |

== Demographics ==
Historical population
| Census | Pop. | Note | %± |
|---|---|---|---|
| 1880 | 2,833 | | — |
| 1890 | 3,659 | | 29.2% |
| 1900 | 3,659 | | 0.0% |
| 1910 | 4,520 | | 23.5% |
| 1920 | 4,932 | | 9.1% |
| 1930 | 5,308 | | 7.6% |
| 1940 | 6,036 | | 13.7% |
| 1950 | 6,734 | | 11.6% |
| 1960 | 7,420 | | 10.2% |
| 1970 | 7,309 | | −1.5% |
| 1980 | 6,318 | | −13.6% |
| 1990 | 6,649 | | 5.2% |
| 2000 | 6,561 | | −1.3% |
| 2010 | 7,267 | | 10.8% |
| 2020 | 7,997 | | 10.0% |
U.S. Decennial Census

=== 2020 census ===
As of the 2020 census, Winooski had a population of 7,997. The median age was 33.1 years, 15.6% of residents were under the age of 18, 11.8% of residents were 65 years of age or older, for every 100 females there were 99.3 males, and for every 100 females age 18 and over there were 98.2 males age 18 and over.

100.0% of residents lived in urban areas, while 0.0% lived in rural areas.

There were 3,844 households in Winooski, of which 17.3% had children under the age of 18 living in them. Of all households, 25.7% were married-couple households, 28.4% were households with a male householder and no spouse or partner present, and 32.6% were households with a female householder and no spouse or partner present. About 41.6% of all households were made up of individuals and 11.2% had someone living alone who was 65 years of age or older.

There were 4,027 housing units, of which 4.5% were vacant. The homeowner vacancy rate was 0.9% and the rental vacancy rate was 2.7%.

Racial composition as of the 2020 census
| Race | Number | Percent |
|---|---|---|
| White | 5,711 | 71.4% |
| Black or African American | 730 | 9.1% |
| American Indian and Alaska Native | 41 | 0.5% |
| Asian | 902 | 11.3% |
| Native Hawaiian and Other Pacific Islander | 4 | 0.1% |
| Some other race | 77 | 1.0% |
| Two or more races | 532 | 6.7% |
| Hispanic or Latino (of any race) | 247 | 3.1% |

=== 2010 census ===
As of the 2010 census, 7,267 people and 3,252 households were residing in the city. The population density was 5,191 people per square mile (1,964.1/km^{2}). The 3,393 housing units had an average density of 2,107.5 per square mile (814.1/km^{2}). The racial makeup of the city was 82.5% White (81.5% non-Hispanic White alone), 6.9% African American, 0.3% Native American, 6.2% Asian, 0.58% from other races, and 3.3% from two or more races. Hispanics or Latinos of any race were 2.2% of the population. About 36% of the population are of French and French-Canadian ancestry, 13% are Irish, 8% are English, and 5% each are Italian or German.

Of the 3,252 households, 24.2% had children under 18 living with them, 34.4% were couples living together and either married or in a civil union, 11.2% had a female householder with no husband present, and 50.2% were not families. About 36.8% of all households were made up of individuals, and 12.2% had someone living alone who was 65 older. The average household size was 2.21, and the average family size was 2.98; 14.4% of the city's total population was born outside of the United States.

In the city, the age distribution was 21.5% under 18, 12.3% from 18 to 24, 34.8% from 25 to 44, 17.8% from 45 to 64, and 13.5% who were 65 or older. The median age was 33 years. For every 100 females, there were 94.5 males. For every 100 females 18 and over, there were 91.4 males.

== Economy ==
=== Personal income ===
The median income for a household in the city was $30,592, and for a family was $38,551. Males had a median income of $30,257 versus $21,168 for females. The per capita income for the city was $17,208. About 10.2% of families and 15.2% of the population were below the poverty line, including 19.8% of those under age 18 and 13.1% of those age 65 or over.

== Transportation ==
Bus service is provided by Green Mountain Transit.

The city is served by Interstate 89, and US Routes 2 and 7.

== Notable people ==
- Jan Backus, a former Vermont state senator, lives in Winooski.
- Peter Clavelle, former mayor of Burlington, was born in Winooski.
- David E. Demag, US Marshal for Vermont, raised and educated in Winooski

== Gallery ==
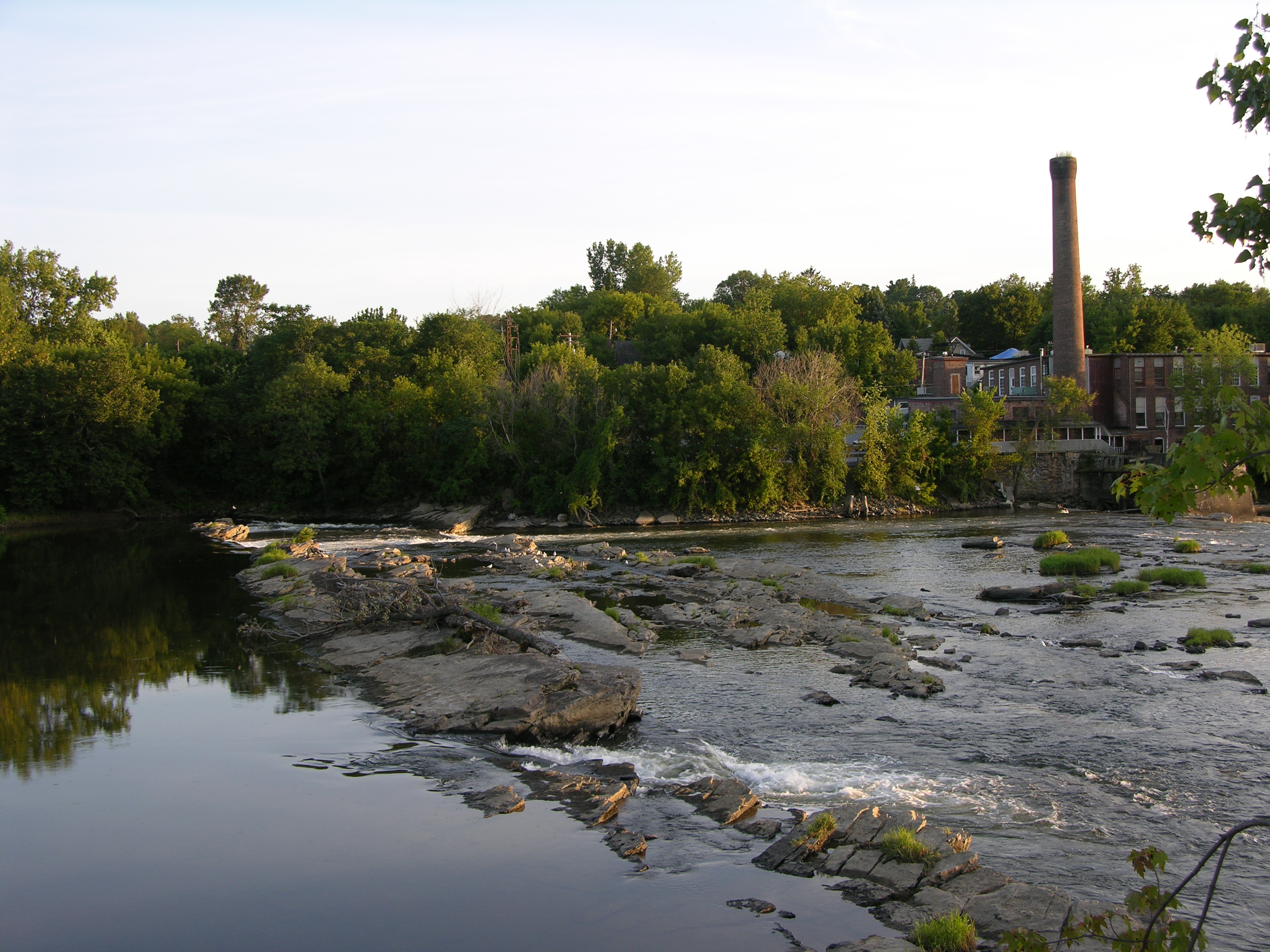
Mill and falls in Winooski

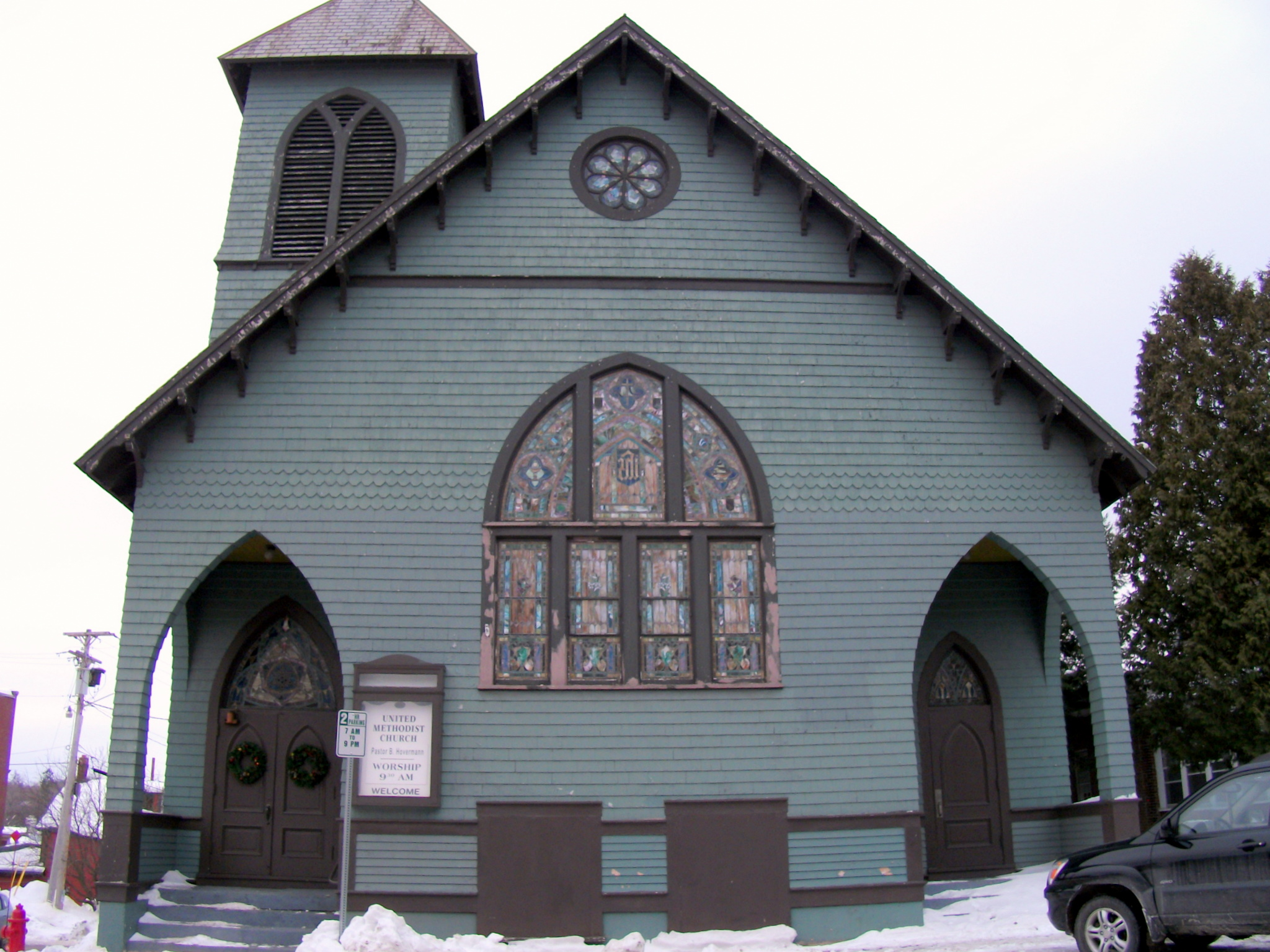
Methodist Episcopal Church of Winooski

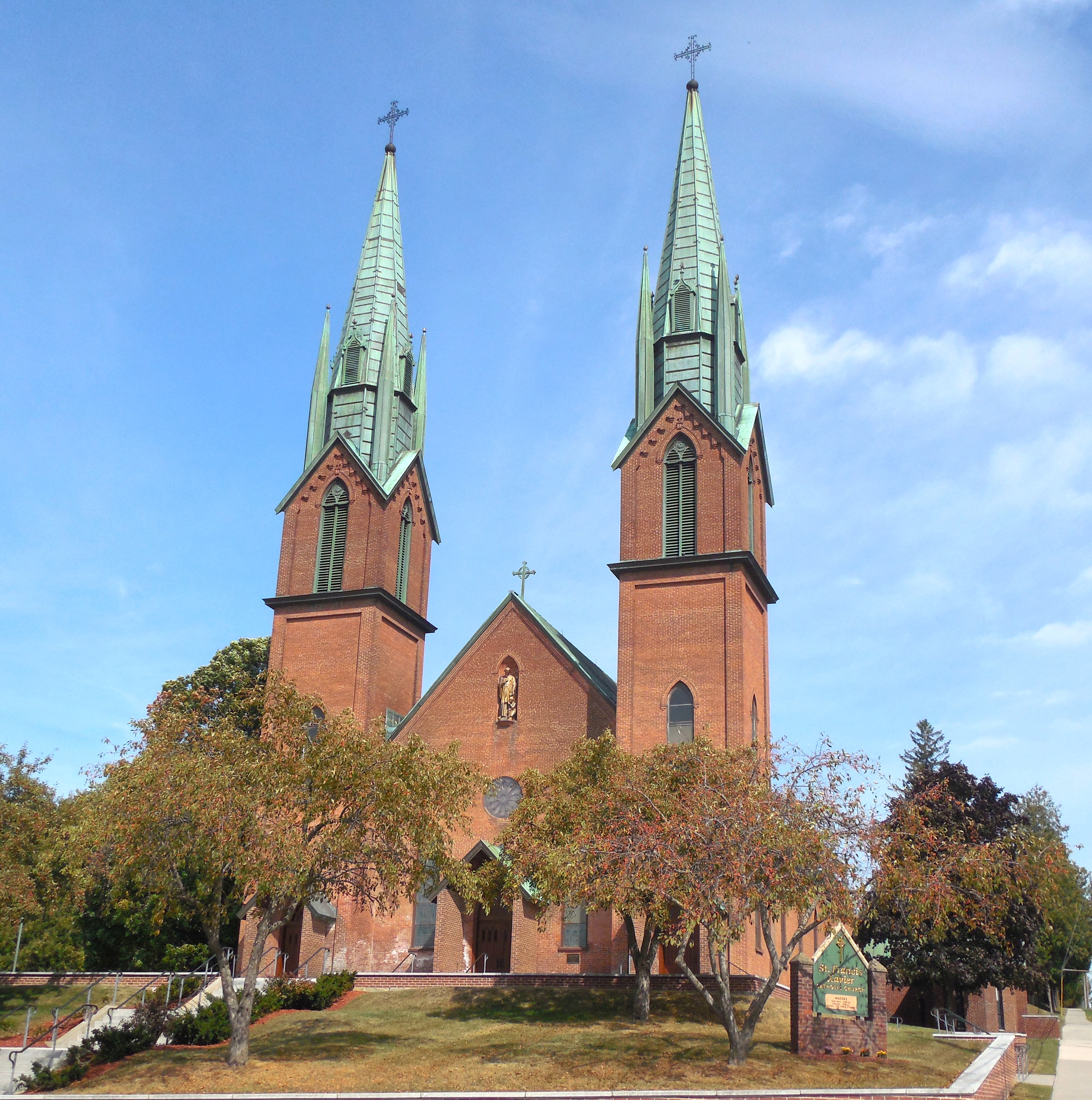
St. Francis Xavier Church on St. Peter Street

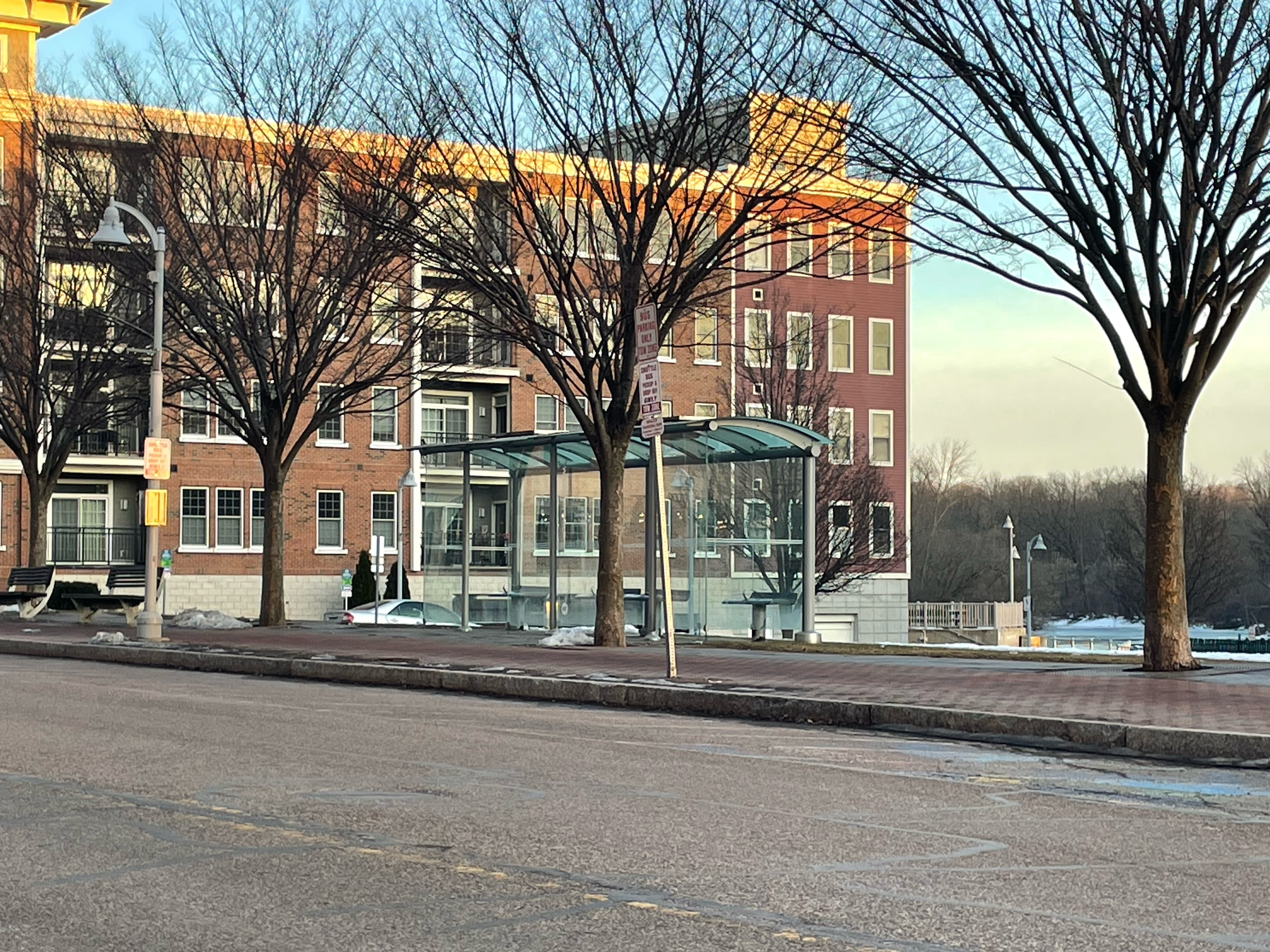
Winooski Falls bus stop on a clear winter day

Dam for the hydroelectric plant
