= Simon Brown =

Simon Brown may refer to:

- Simon Brome (died 1603), or Brown, MP for Canterbury
- Simon Brown (author) (born 1956), Australian science fiction writer
- Simon Brown (basketball) (born 1986), British wheelchair basketball player
- Simon Brown (cricketer) (born 1969), English cricketer
- Simon Brown (footballer, born 1976), English footballer
- Simon Brown (footballer, born 1983), English footballer
- Simon Brown (boxer) (born 1963), Jamaican boxer
- Simon Brown (musician), British composer, singer and conductor
- Simon Brown (Massachusetts politician) (1802–1873), Lieutenant Governor for Massachusetts
- Simon Brown (skier) (1942–2017), Australian Olympic skier
- Simon Brown, Baron Brown of Eaton-under-Heywood (1937–2023), British judge, Law Lord and member of the British Privy Council
- Simon P. Brown (born 1963), English golfer
- Simon Brown (rugby league) (born 1989), English rugby league footballer

== See also ==
- Simon Browne (1680–1732), English dissenting minister and theologian
