= King's College, Cambridge =

College of the University of Cambridge

King's College
- University of Cambridge
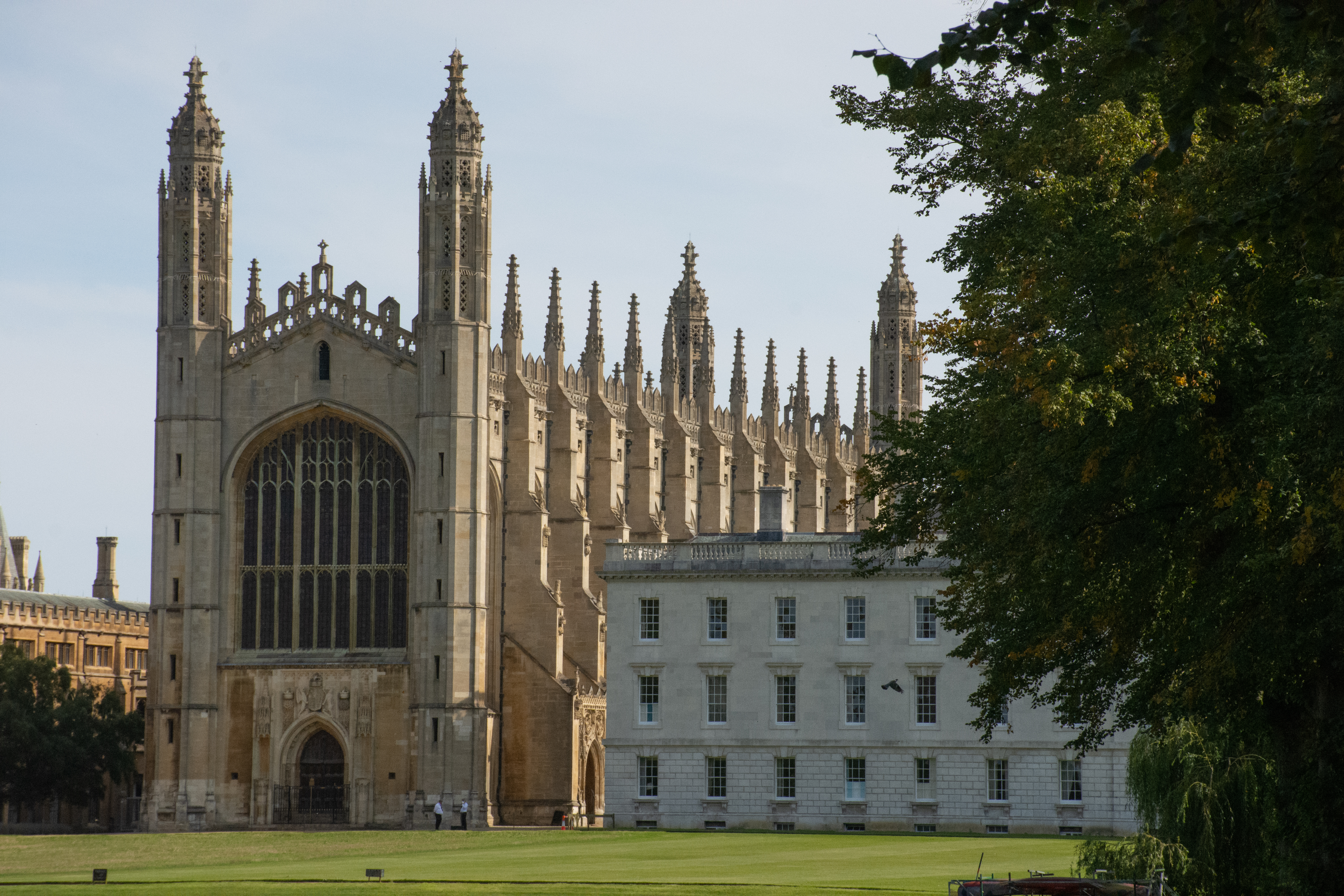
- King's College Chapel and the Gibbs' Building

- Arms of King's College; Arms: Sable, three roses argent, a chief per pale azure and gules charged on the dexter side with a fleur-de-lis and on the sinister with a lion passant gardant or
Scarf colours: royal purple, with two equally-spaced narrow white stripes
- Location: King's Parade, Cambridge CB2 1ST (map)
- Coordinates: 52.2043°N 0.1162°E
- Full name: The King's College of Our Lady and Saint Nicholas in Cambridge
- Latin name: Collegium Regale beate Marie et sancti Nicholai Cantebrigie
- Abbreviation: K
- Founder: Henry VI
- Established: 1441; 585 years ago
- Named after: Our Lady, patron saint of Eton College; Nicholas, natal saint of Henry VI
- Sister colleges: Eton College; New College, Oxford
- Provost: Gillian Tett
- Undergraduates: 463 (2022–23)
- Postgraduates: 326 (2022–23)
- Endowment: £340M (2024)
- Visitor: Stephen Conway (Bishops of Lincoln ex officio)
- Website: www.kings.cam.ac.uk
- KCSU: www.kcsu.org.uk
- KCGU: www.kcgu.org.uk
- Boat club: King's College Boat Club

Map
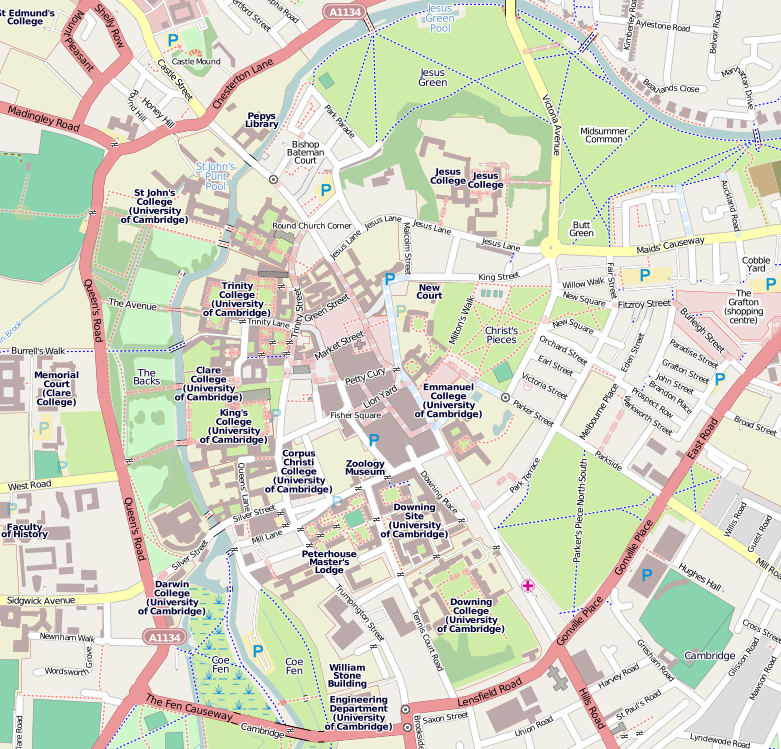
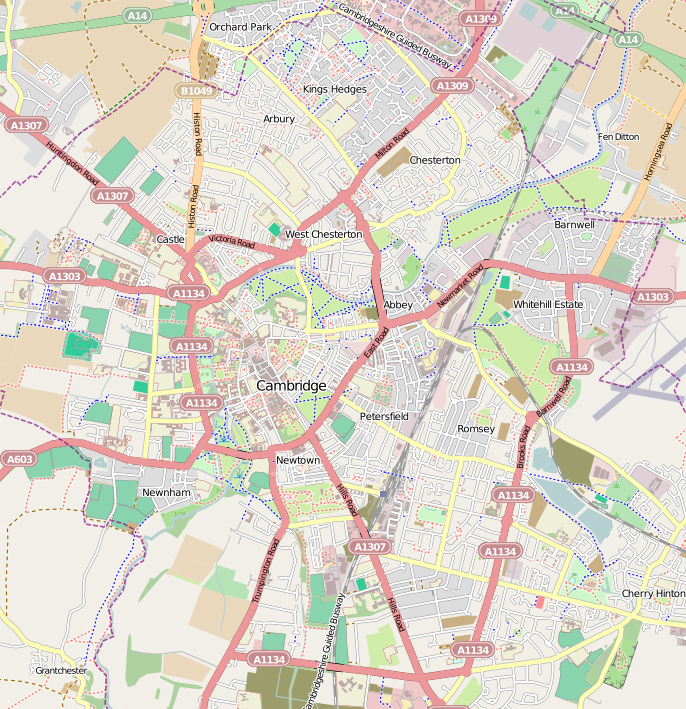
- Location within Central Cambridge Location within Cambridge

King's College, formally The King's College of Our Lady and Saint Nicholas in Cambridge, is a constituent college of the University of Cambridge. The college lies beside the River Cam and faces out onto King's Parade in the centre of the city.

King's was founded in 1441 by King Henry VI soon after founding its sister institution, Eton College. Initially, King's accepted only students from Eton College. However, the king's plans for King's College were disrupted by the Wars of the Roses and the resultant scarcity of funds, and then his eventual deposition. Little progress was made on the project until 1508, when King Henry VII began to take an interest in the college, probably as a political move to legitimise his new position. The building of the college's chapel began in 1446, and was finished in 1544 during the reign of Henry VIII.

King's College Chapel is regarded as one of the finest examples of late English Gothic architecture. It has the world's largest fan vault, while its stained-glass windows and wooden chancel screen are considered some of the finest from their era. The building is seen as emblematic of Cambridge. It houses the Choir of King's College, Cambridge. Every year on Christmas Eve, the Festival of Nine Lessons and Carols (a service originally devised for Truro Cathedral by Edward White Benson in 1880, adapted by the college dean Eric Milner-White in 1918) is broadcast from the chapel to millions of listeners worldwide.

== History ==
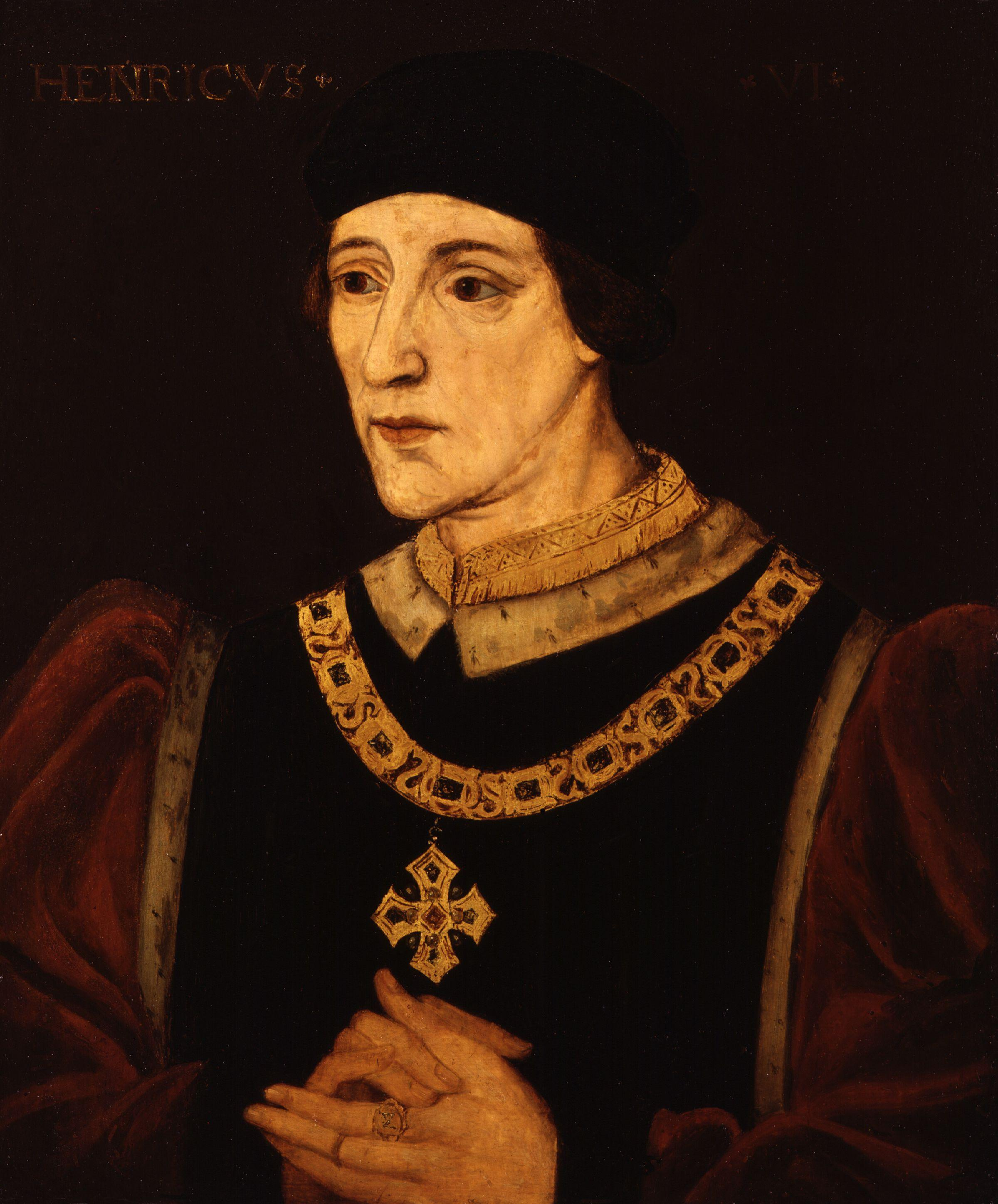
Henry VI, the college's founder

=== Foundation ===
On 12 February 1441, King Henry VI issued letters patent founding a college at Cambridge for a rector and 12 poor scholars. This college was to be named after Saint Nicholas upon whose feast day Henry had been born. The first stone of the college's Old Court was laid by the King on Passion Sunday, 2 April 1441 on a site which lies directly north of the modern college and which was formerly a garden belonging to Trinity Hall. William Millington, a fellow of Clare College (then called Clare Hall) was installed as the rector.

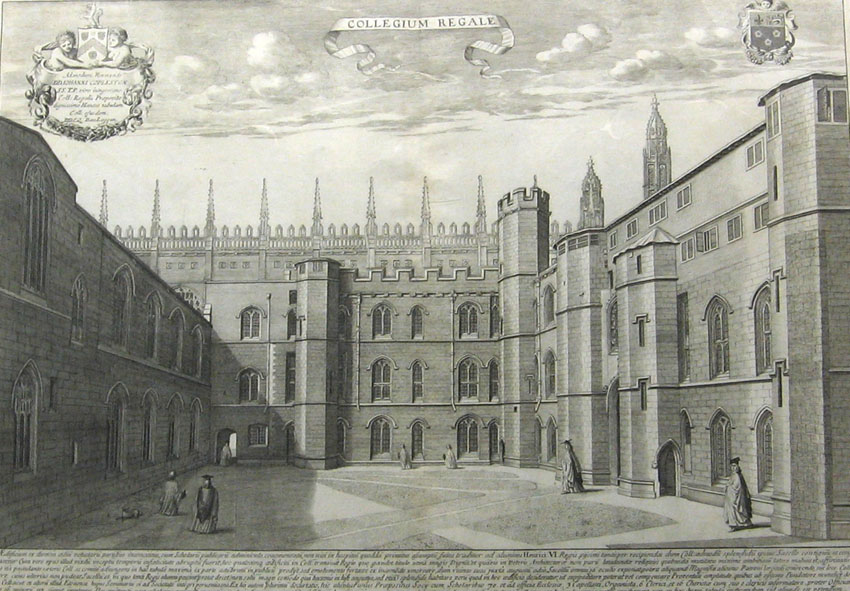
Old Court

Henry directed the publication of the college's first governing statutes in 1443. His original modest plan for the college was abandoned, and provision was instead made for a community of 70 fellows and scholars headed by a provost. Henry had belatedly learned of William of Wykeham's 1379 twin foundations of New College, Oxford and Winchester College, and wanted his own achievements to surpass those of Wykeham. The King had founded Eton College on 11 October 1440 but, up until 1443, King's and Eton had been unconnected. However, that year the relationship between the two was remodelled upon Wykeham's successful institutions and the original sizes of the colleges scaled up to surpass Wykeham's. A second royal charter which re-founded the now much larger King's College was issued on 12 July 1443. On 1 September 1444, the Provosts of King's and Eton and the Wardens of Winchester and New College formally signed the Amicabilis Concordia ("friendly agreement") in which they bound their colleges to support one another legally and financially.

Members of King's were to be recruited entirely from Eton. Each year, the provost and two fellows travelled to Eton to impartially select the worthiest boys to fill any vacancies at the college, always maintaining the total number of scholars and fellows at exactly 70. Membership of King's was a vocation for life. Scholars were eligible for election to the fellowship after three years of probation, irrespective of whether they had achieved a degree or not. Undergraduates at King's – unlike those from other colleges – did not have to pass university examinations to achieve their BA degree and instead had only to satisfy the college. Every fellow was to study theology, save for two who were to study astronomy, two civil law, four canon law, and two medicine; all fellows save those studying secular subjects were obliged to take Holy Orders and become priests, on pain of expulsion. In 1445, a Papal Bull from Eugenius IV exempted college members from parish duties, and in 1457, an agreement between the provost and chancellor of the university limited the chancellor's authority and gave the college full jurisdiction over internal matters.

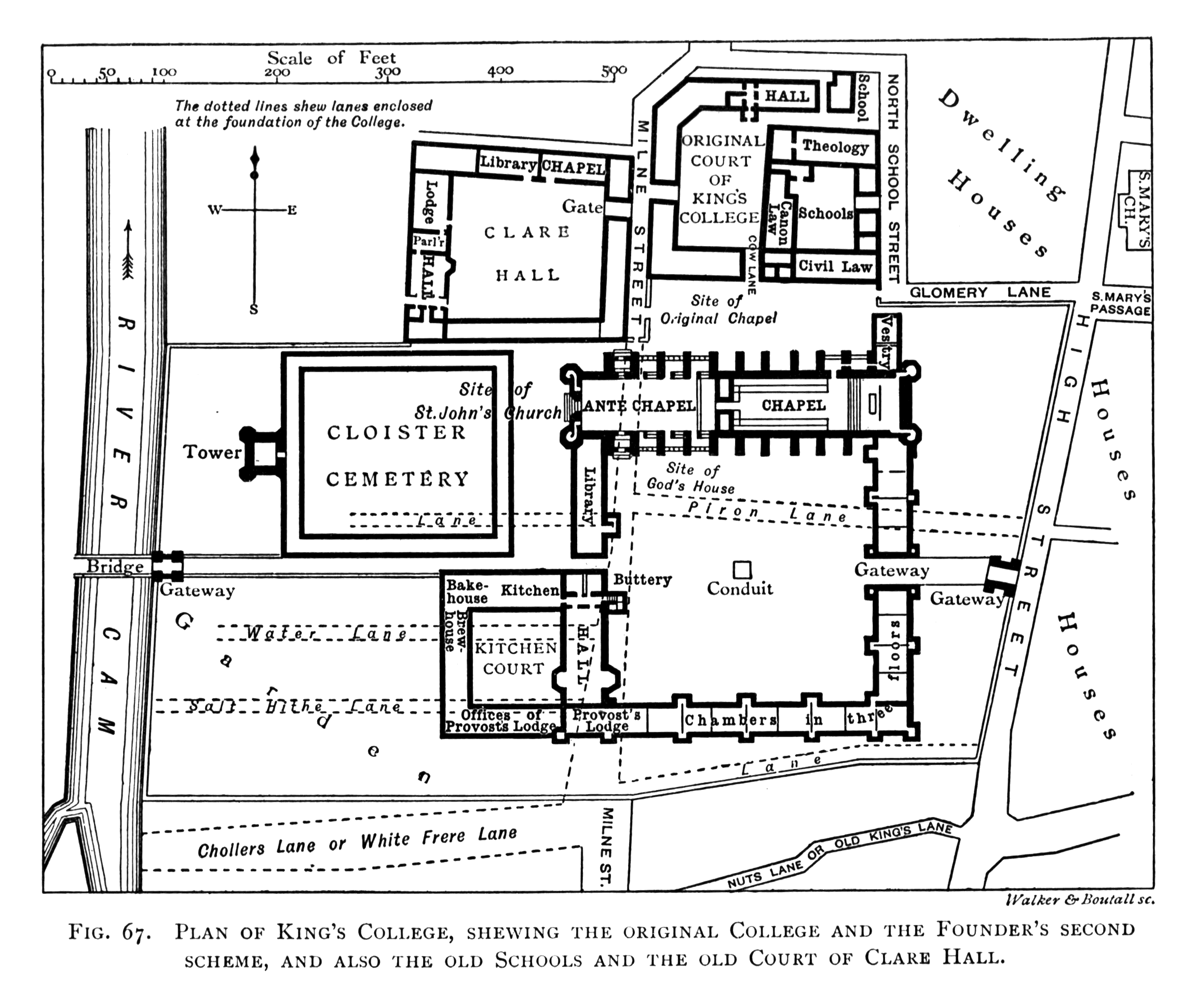
Henry VI's revised plan for the college

=== Henry VI, Henry VII and Henry VIII ===
The original plans for Old Court were too small to comfortably accommodate the larger college community of the second foundation, and so in 1443 Henry VI began to purchase the land upon which the modern college now stands. The gateway and south range of Old Court had already been built, but the rest was completed in a temporary fashion to serve until the new court was ready. The new college site was itself left unfinished and the "temporary" Old Court buildings, arranged to accommodate 70, served as the permanent residential fabric of the college until the beginning of the 19th century. Henry's grand design for the new college buildings survives in the 1448 Founder's Will, which describes his vision in detail. The new college site was to be centred on a great courtyard, bordered on all sides by adjoining buildings: a chapel to the north; accommodation and the entrance gate to the east; further accommodation and the provost's lodge to the south; and a library, hall and buttery to the west. Behind the hall and buttery was to be another courtyard, and behind the library a cloistered cemetery including a magnificent bell tower.

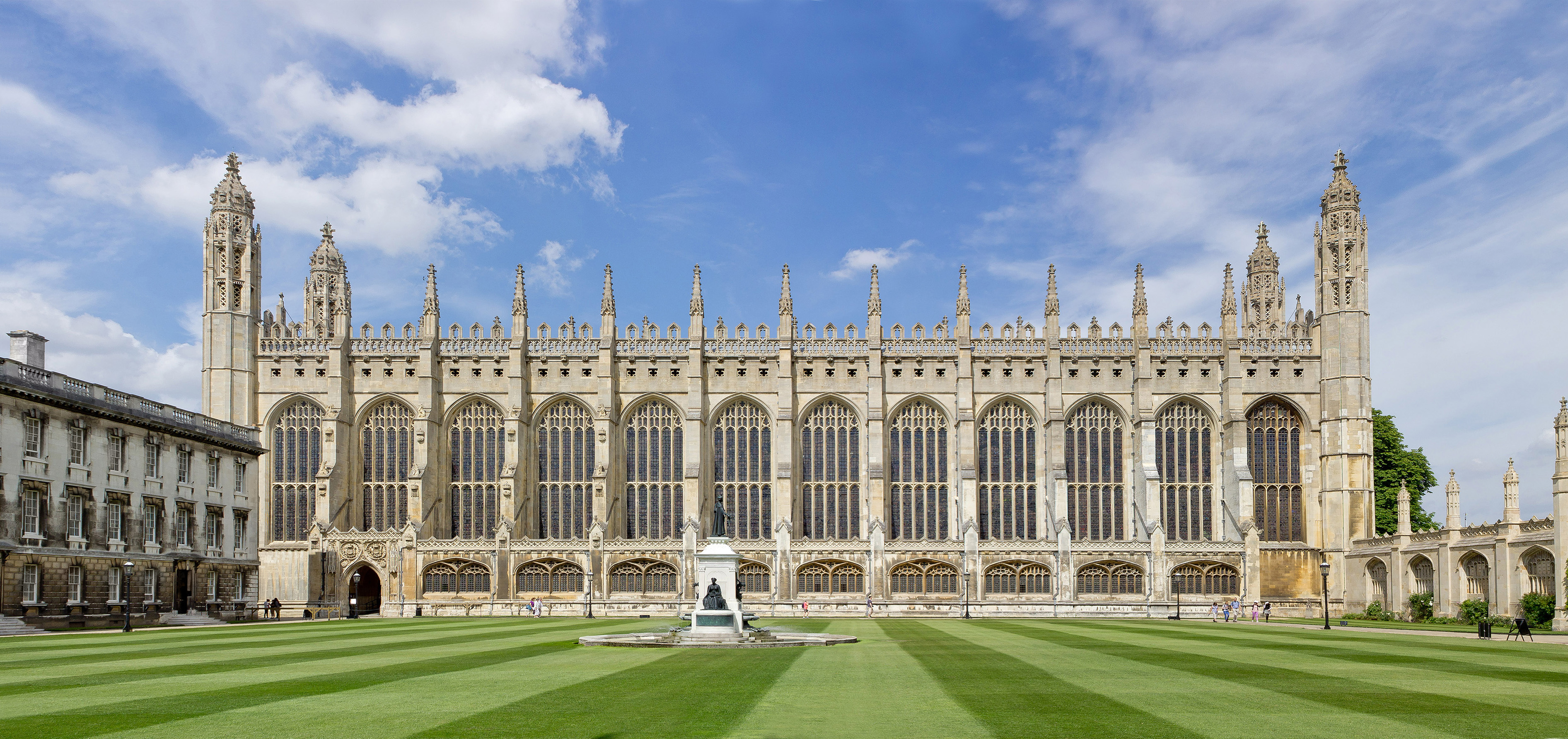
The College Chapel, as first planned by Henry VI. The building line between light and dark stone can be seen on the chapel's side.

The first stone of the chapel was laid by the King on St James's Day, 25 July 1446. The King encouraged support for the college. In 1448, John Conches, former prior of Wootton Wawen gave the priory's lands to "John Chedworth provost of the king's college of St. Mary and St. Nicholas Cantebrigge and the scholars thereof, and to their successors." Within a decade Henry's engagement in the Wars of the Roses meant that funds began to dry up. By the time of Henry's deposition in 1461, the chapel walls had been raised 60 ft high at the east end but only 8 ft at the west; a building line which can still be seen today as the boundary between the lighter stone below and the darker above. Work proceeded sporadically until a generation later in 1508 when the Founder's nephew Henry VII was prevailed upon to finish the shell of the building. The interior had to wait a further generation until completion by 1544 with the aid of Henry VIII. The chapel was the only part of Henry VI's Founder's Will to be realised.

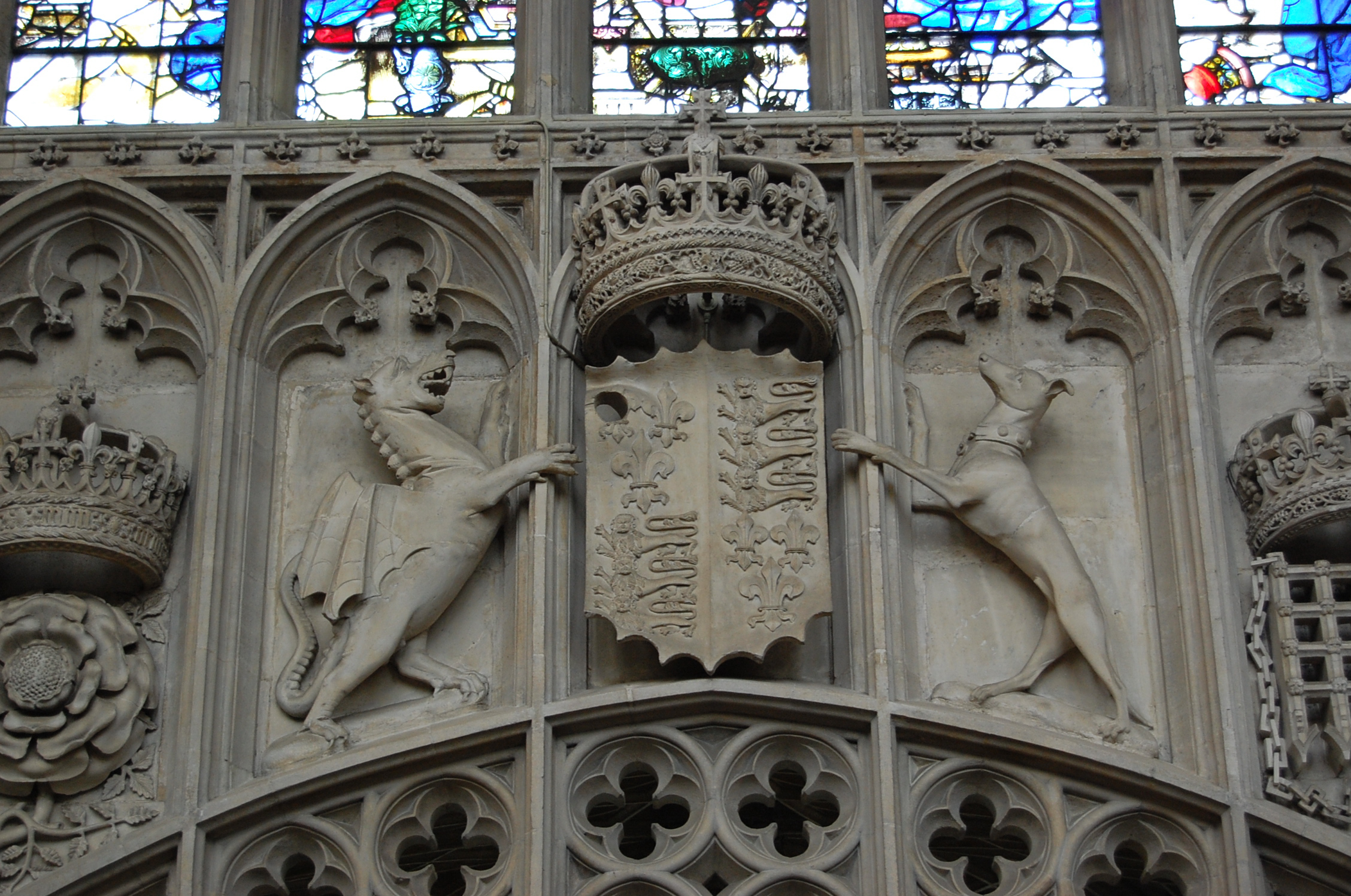
Coat of arms of King Henry VII, interior stonework of the chapel's west end

It has been speculated that the choice of the college as a beneficiary by the two later Henrys was a political one, with Henry VII in particular concerned to legitimate a new, post-civil war Tudor regime by demonstrating patronage of what was by definition the King's College. Later building work on the chapel is marked by an uninhibited branding with the Tudor rose and other symbols of the new establishment, quite against the precise instructions of the Founder's Will.

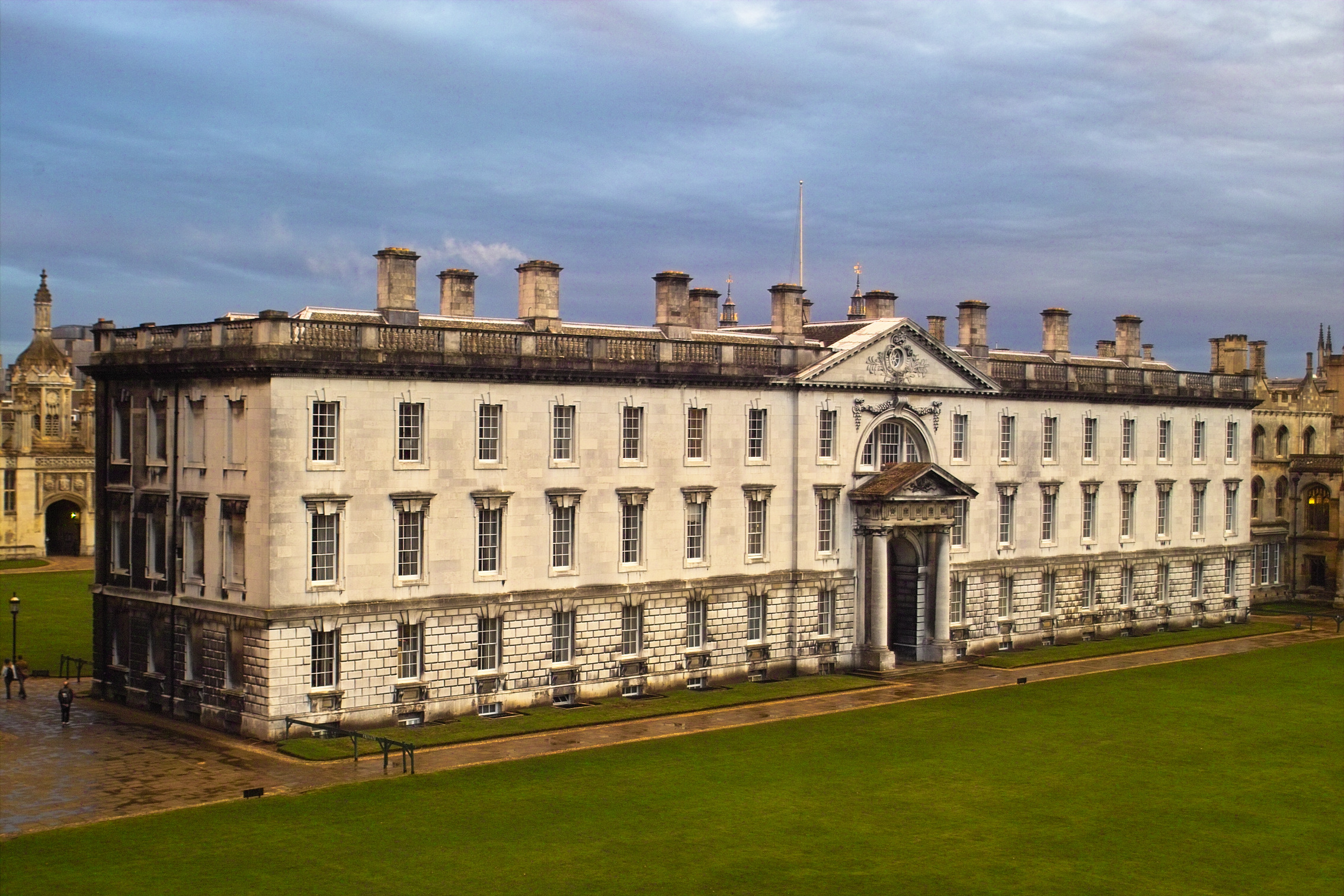
The Gibbs' Building

=== Front Court completed ===
The college remained as the Old Court, chapel and a few small surrounding buildings for nearly two-hundred years until in 1724 the architect James Gibbs provided a new plan to complete the courtyard of which the chapel formed the north side. Although his design was for the courtyard to be closed by three similar detached Neoclassical buildings, due to lack of funds only the western of these was constructed. The first stone of what became known as the Gibbs' Building was laid by Provost Andrew Snape, at the time also vice-chancellor of the university, on 25 March 1723 and the building completed six years later.

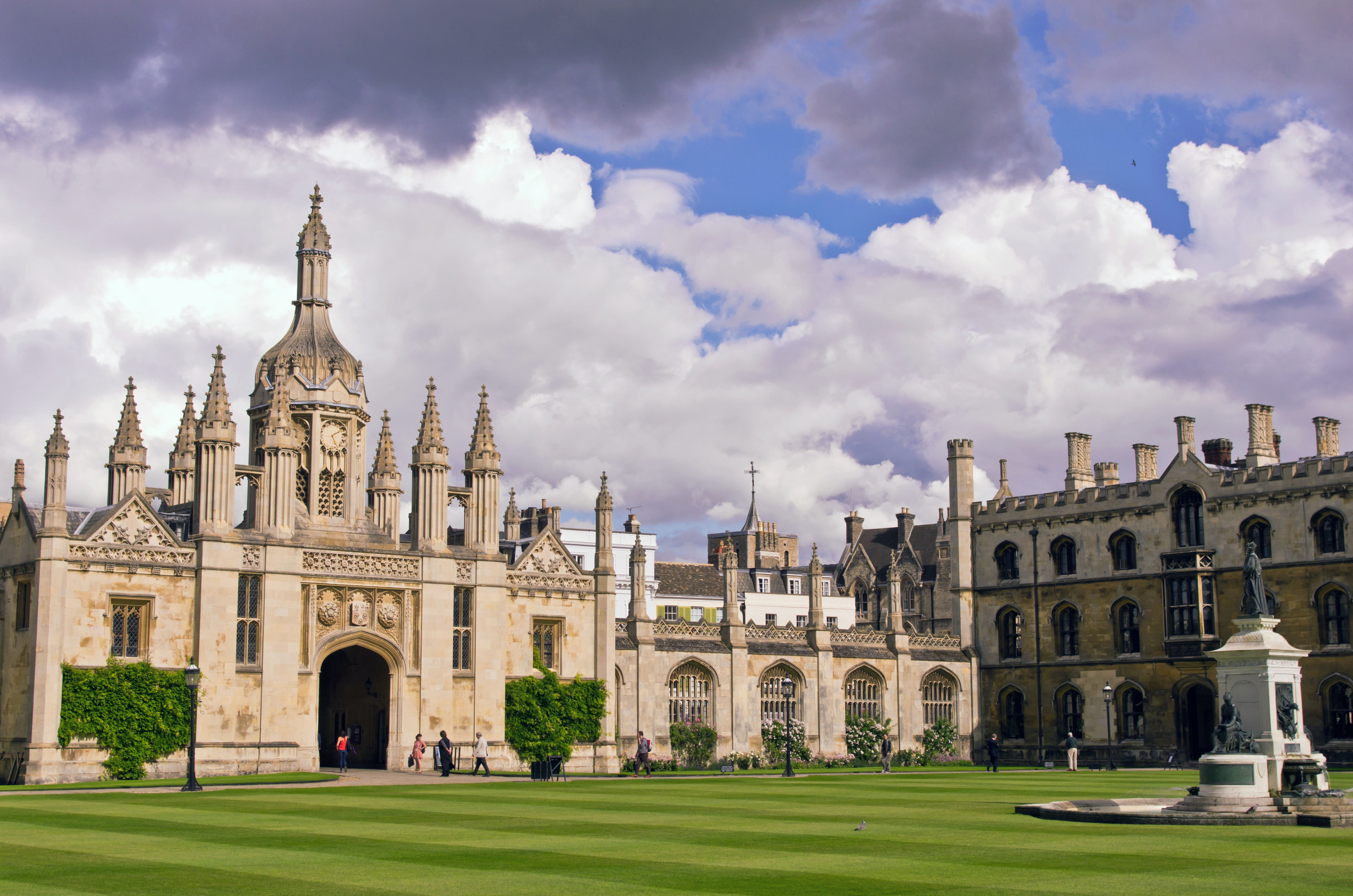
The east and south sides of Front Court, designed by William Wilkins

Front Court was finally completed in 1828 under plans drawn up by William Wilkins. The courtyard was closed by a screen and gatehouse to the east; and residential staircases either side of a hall to the south. The southern buildings continued towards the river with a library and Provost's lodge. All these buildings were, at the college's insistence, built in the Gothic Revival style rather than Wilkins's preferred Neoclassical.

With the courtyard to the south of the chapel now able to accommodate the college, the land to the north was sold to the university in 1828. It has been erroneously claimed that this was the site of the world's first bonsai tree, cultivated in King's College in the mid 18th century. The university demolished most of the original Old Court buildings in order to make room for an extension to the University Library; only the gateway arch opposite Clare College survives. The library subsequently moved away from this site, known as the Old Schools, and the buildings are currently used for the main administrative offices of the university.

=== Victorian reforms and expansion ===
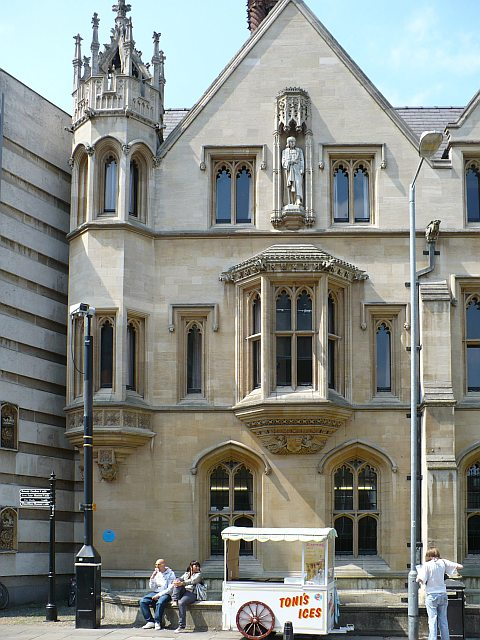
Scott's Building

Under the provostship of Richard Okes, from 1850 until his death in 1888, the college began a period of reform. On 1 May 1851 it was agreed to abolish the privilege of King's members to be granted a degree without passing the university examinations. In 1861 the college statutes were amended so as to expand the college and, more radically, to allow for the election of non-Etonian King's members: the new statutes provided for 46 Fellows, 24 scholarships reserved for boys from Eton, and 24 "open" scholarships for boys from any school. At the same time all formal obligation to take Holy Orders – unenforced since the 17th century – was removed. The statutes were again amended in 1882, this time ensuring fellowships were not always for life and were awarded on merit after submissions of original research. In his 1930 memoir As We Were, A Victorian Peep Show, E. F. Benson, an alumnus of King's, recollected the peculiar behaviour of some of the surviving Life Fellows from his undergraduate years of 1887–1890 and before. Of one he wrote, "He then shuffled out on to the big lawn, with a stick in his hand, and he prodded with it at the worms in the grass, muttering to himself, 'Ah, damn ye: ye haven't got me yet.'" The first non-Etonian students were admitted to study at King's in 1865, and the first non-Etonian scholars and the first non-Etonian fellow were elected in 1873. These reforms continued over subsequent decades and there are now no special privileges for Etonians at King's.

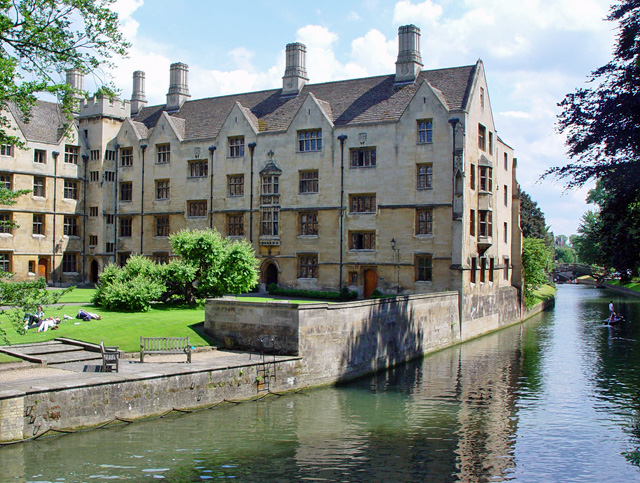
Bodley's Court

Expansion of the college through the 1861 statutes necessitated more building work to accommodate the larger community. In 1869, the area along King's Parade between the Wilkins' Buildings and King's Lane was built upon after a design by George Gilbert Scott. When completed a year later, the new courtyard formed was named after Walter Chetwynd, a fellow of the college. However, after subsequent plans to expand college accommodation fell through, King's opened negotiations to amalgamate with St Catharine's College. Although St Catharine's had been founded by Robert Woodlark (sometimes spelled Wodelarke), a Provost of King's, the college declined the invitation to combine. Eventually, in 1893, the east and south wings of another new courtyard within King's – designed by George Frederick Bodley and overlooking the river – were completed.

=== 20th century ===
In 1909, the south range of a third new courtyard – named after its architect Aston Webb – was built to the south of the library. In 1927, designs by G. L. Kennedy completed Bodley's Court with a new northern range, and Webb's Court with a new Provost's Lodge on its western side.

In 1930, a Cambridge Borough Police officer was shot dead by a student who also shot his tutor in the same incident.

On 1 September 1939, the day of the German invasion of Poland and the cause of the UK's entrance into World War II, permission was sought from the College Council to remove the stained glass from the east window of the chapel. By the end of 1941, all the ancient glass had been removed to various cellars in Cambridge for safekeeping. Despite most of the windows of the chapel being covered over by sheets of tar-paper, which rattled loudly in the wind, the Festival of Nine Lessons and Carols continued to be broadcast from the chapel every Christmas Eve throughout the war – even though the name of the college could not be broadcast for security reasons. King's took the opportunity of these years to clean, repair and photograph the glass. By 1949, all the windows had been restored.

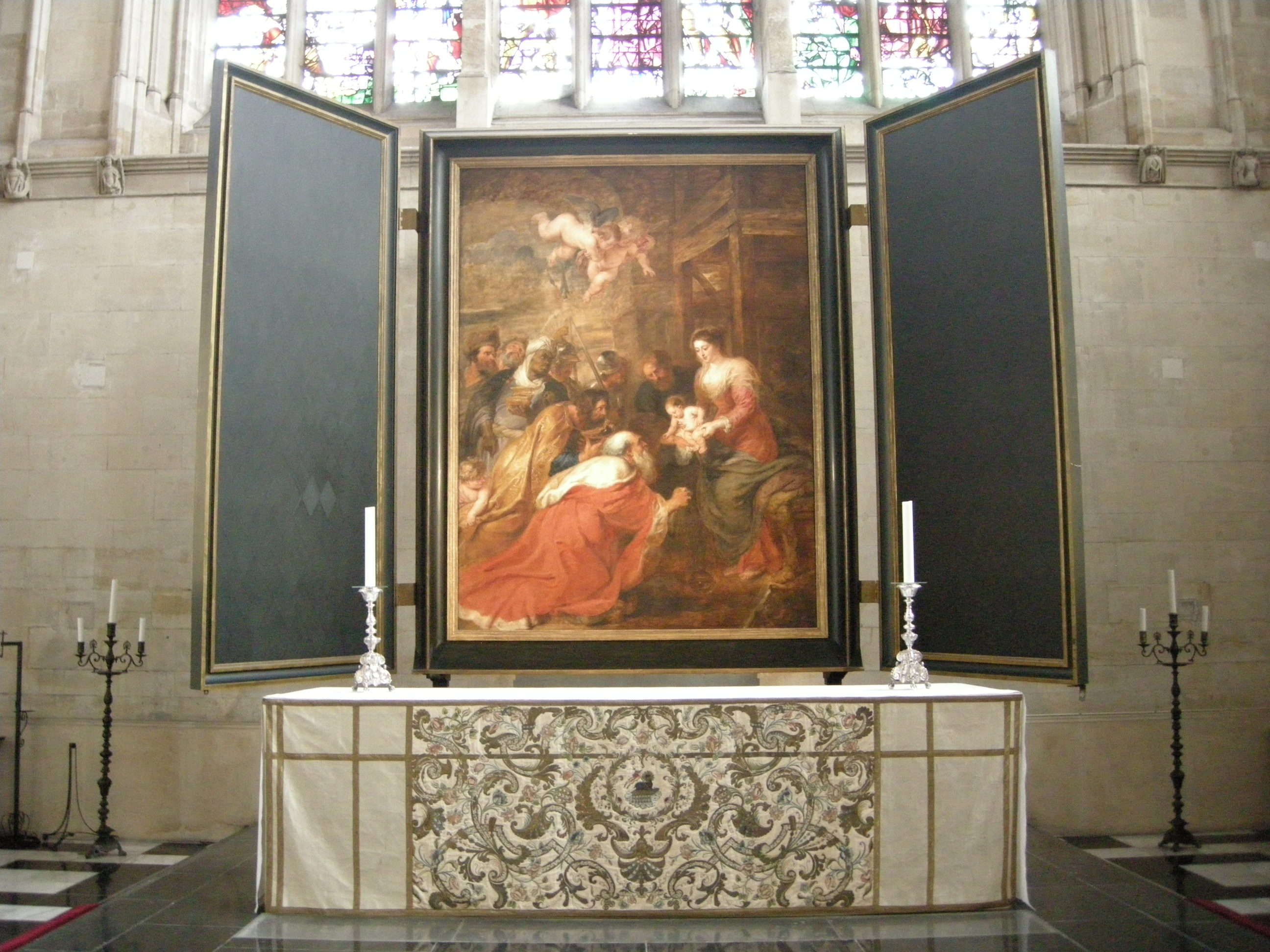
Rubens' Adoration of the Magi behind the chapel altar

In 1961, the property millionaire Alfred Ernest Allnatt offered King's the Adoration of the Magi by Peter Paul Rubens, which he had purchased in 1959 for a world-record price. The college accepted "this munificent gift" with the intention of displaying the painting in the chapel, possibly as an altarpiece. The painting was initially displayed in the antechapel but a significant faction of the fellowship – including Michael Jaffé and the Provost Noel Annan – were determined for the painting to become the focal point of an entirely redesigned east end planned by the architect Sir Martyn Beckett, who was "philosophical about the furore this inevitably occasioned – which quickly became acceptance of a solution to a difficult problem."

As the first stage of this project, the Edwardian reredos and 17th-century wood panelling were removed and the Rubens installed in their stead behind the altar in April 1964. The painting was so big that the raised floor of the chapel's east end, required by the 1448 Founder's Will, would have to be levelled so as to prevent the baroque artwork obscuring the bottom of the Tudor east window. However 20 fellows and the honorary fellow E. M. Forster signed a letter urging the college to reverse its plan and "admit that it has made a mistake"; the levelling of the floor nevertheless went ahead. The newly refitted east end opened in 1968 and proved highly controversial, with the Architects' Journal criticising it as "motivated not by the demands of liturgical worship but by those of museum display."

The last main-site building to be erected by the college was the Keynes Building, finished in 1967 and named after the former college bursar John Maynard Keynes. This building enclosed Chetwynd Court along with the Wilkins' and Scott's buildings, and provided more than 70 en-suite accommodation rooms along with other facilities.

The college, along with most others at the university, had been all-male since its foundation. However, in 1972, under the provost Edmund Leach, King's together with Churchill and Clare became the first three previously all-male colleges to admit women.

=== 21st century ===
In June 2018, Priyamvada Gopal alleged racial profiling by college porters at the gate of King's College, Cambridge. Gopal said that she was subjected to racial profiling and aggression by the porters and gatekeepers of King's and said porters frequently hassled non-white staff and students at the gates. While several students and staff corroborated her accusations, a King's College spokeswoman denied wrongdoing by staff. As a result of the attention the issue received, Cambridge University students came forward describing similar experiences. Gopal said that she received hate mail following her announcement. Gopal announced that she would no longer supervise students at King's until there was a resolution to the long-standing problem.

In 2024, the lawn between the college and King's Parade was the site of an encampment created by students to protest against the Israel-Gaza war, and to demand that the college divest from any holdings that may support the Israeli occupation of Palestine.

Henry VI is not completely forgotten at the college. The Saturday after the end of Michaelmas term each year is Founder's Day, which begins with a Founder's Eucharist in the chapel, followed by a Founder's Breakfast with ale and culminating in a sumptuous dinner in his memory called "Founder's Feast" to which all members of college in their third year of studies are invited.

== Buildings and grounds ==
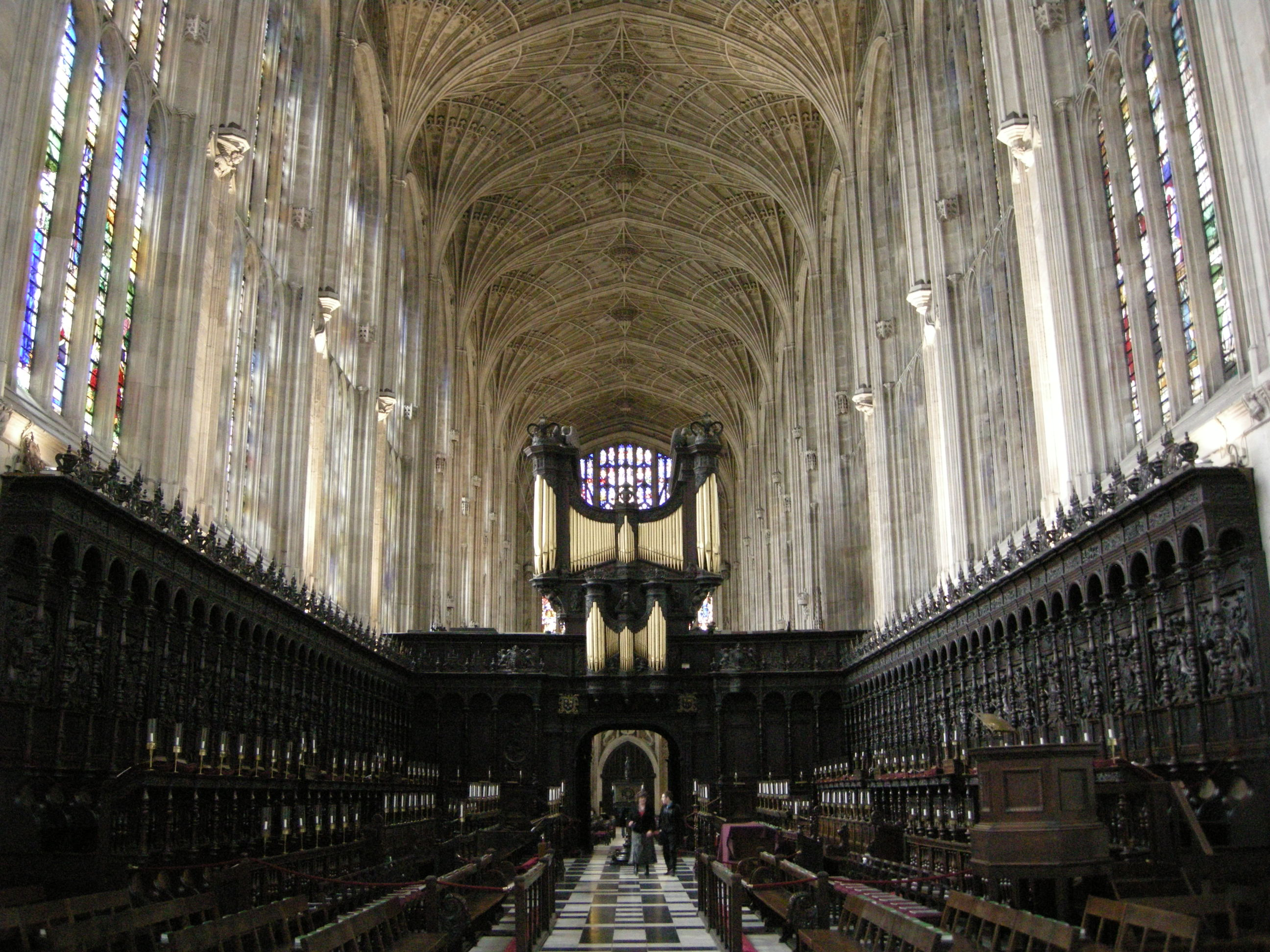
Interior of the chapel

=== Chapel ===
The College Chapel, an example of late Gothic architecture, was built over a period of a hundred years (1446–1531) in three stages. The Chapel features the world's largest fan vault ceiling; 26 large stained-glass windows, 24 of which date from the 16th century; and Peter Paul Rubens's painting the Adoration of the Magi as an altarpiece.

The chapel is actively used as a place of worship and also for some concerts and college events. The Chapel choir consists of organ scholars, choral scholars (male students from the college and other colleges) and choristers (boys educated at the nearby King's College School). The choir sings services on most days in term-time, and also performs concerts and makes recordings and broadcasts. In particular, it has broadcast its Nine Lessons and Carols on the BBC from the Chapel on Christmas Eve for many decades. Additionally, there is a mixed-voice Chapel choir of male and female students, King's Voices, which sings evensong on Mondays during term-time.

=== Front Court ===
Front (or Great) Court is the main court of King's College. It is bounded to the north by the chapel, to the west by the Gibbs (or Fellows') Building of 1723-29, to the south by Wilkins's hall range of 1824-28, and to the east by Wilkins's openwork screen, punctuated at the centre by the gatehouse and porters' lodge. In the middle of the lawn is a fountain of 1874-79, by Armstead, with bronze figures of Henry VI, Religion and Philosophy. Another lawn separates the screen from King's Parade.

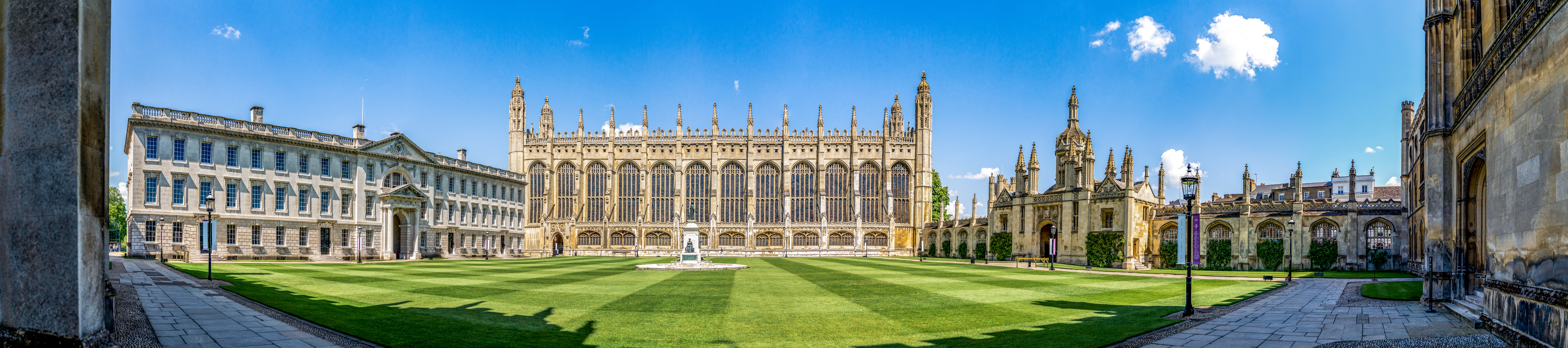

=== Lawn, Backs and Bodley's Buildings ===
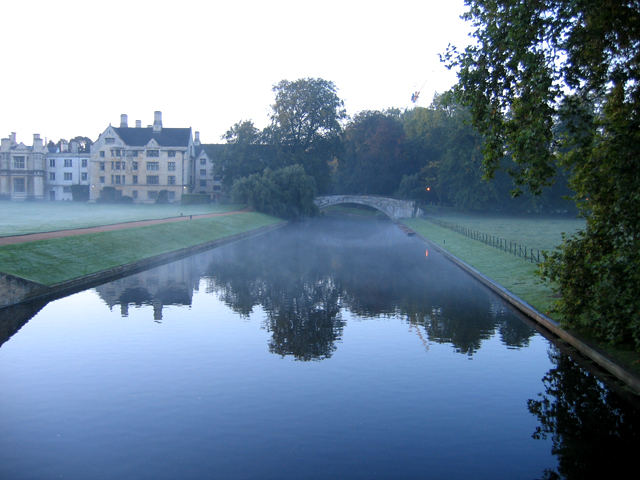
The bridge and Bodley's Buildings

To the west of the Gibbs building is a lawn, on the site of Henry VI's intended cloister and the demolished St John Zachary church. To its north is Clare College, while Wilkins's buildings continue to its south with the library and former provost's lodge. In 2020, part of the lawn was replaced with a wildflower meadow for the first time since 1772, leading to a tripling in biodiversity. A bridge of 1819, again by Wilkins, crosses the Cam onto the Backs. The former provost's lodge is connected to the river by Bodley's Buildings of 1890-93, in a solid neo-Tudor style.

=== Library ===
Since its foundation, the college has housed a library, providing books for all students, covering all the subjects offered by King's. Around 130,000 books are held: some available for teaching and for reference, others being rare books and manuscripts. The library operates a user-oriented purchasing policy: students and Directors of Studies recommend new purchases in their subject. There is both Wi-Fi and Ethernet internet access throughout the library as well as a library computer room. Special collections include a separate Music Library, the Keynes Library, a Global Warming collection, and an Audio Visual Library.

=== Webb's Court ===
Webb's Court lies south of the library, adjoining Queens' Lane and Queens' College. It was built in 1907-09 to designs by Aston Webb and Ingress Bell. It develops Bodley's neo-Tudor style, and contains a gate onto Queens' Lane. To the west of Webb's Court is the provost's lodge, of 1926-29 by GL Kennedy.

=== Keynes Building and Chetwynd Court ===
To the east of Webb's Court, filling the space towards King's Parade and straddling King's Lane, are the buildings of 1964-68, the so-called Cats and Kings development. This was a joint venture with St Catherine's College and was designed by Fello Atkinson. Despite its provision of individual bathrooms, the dark courts and narrow alleys, as well as maintenance problems, mean that this building is not now generally considered a success. Fronting onto King's Parade is George Gilbert Scott's Chetwynd Building of 1871-73.

== Academic profile ==
The unofficial Tompkins Table comparing academic performance ranked King's 12th out of a total of 29 rated colleges at the University of Cambridge in 2019. In terms of first-class degrees, King's ranked 9th in the university with 31.3% of final year students achieving a first.

King's offers all undergraduate courses available at the university, except for education, land economy and veterinary medicine, although Directors of Studies for Anglo-Saxon Norse & Celtic and Management Studies visit from other colleges. With more than 100 fellows and some 420 undergraduate students, King's has one of the highest ratios of fellows to students of all the Cambridge colleges.

=== Admissions ===
The college has gradually broadened its intake to include many students from state schools, often having the highest proportion of maintained school acceptances of the undergraduate colleges. This has led to accusations of reactionary bias against public school pupils and of affirmative action (positive discrimination), although the relatively high proportion of state-school students reflects the far greater number of applications from pupils at maintained schools in comparison to other Cambridge colleges.

King's has established a Schools Liaison Officer post in order to provide support to students, whatever their background, and schools and colleges of any type to find out more about the University of Cambridge and the college. King's is the link Cambridge college for schools in North East England through Cambridge University Area Links Scheme.

Generally, the atmosphere at King's is considered to be easier than that of other colleges to integrate into for students from a working-class or minority background. However, a survey conducted by Varsity Newspaper in January 2009 revealed that the average parental income of students who participated in the survey at King's was higher than the university average.

=== Entrepreneurship and business ===
In 2014, King's College established an Entrepreneurship Prize opened to King's College students with alumni as judges, including Hermann Hauser, and Stuart Lyons, the former chairman of Beales. In 2021, it launched the King's Entrepreneurship Lab to "support students with a future interest in innovation, entrepreneurship, and business" co-directed by King's fellows Kamiar Mohaddes and Thomas Roulet, who are lecturers at the Cambridge Judge Business School. In 2022, it received an additional donation from the Gatsby Foundation to enlarge its scope.

The college has had a number of notable alumni in business, including Alfred Allen Booth, Phil Vincent, Nancy Zhang and famous innovators such as Charles Townshend.

== Student life ==
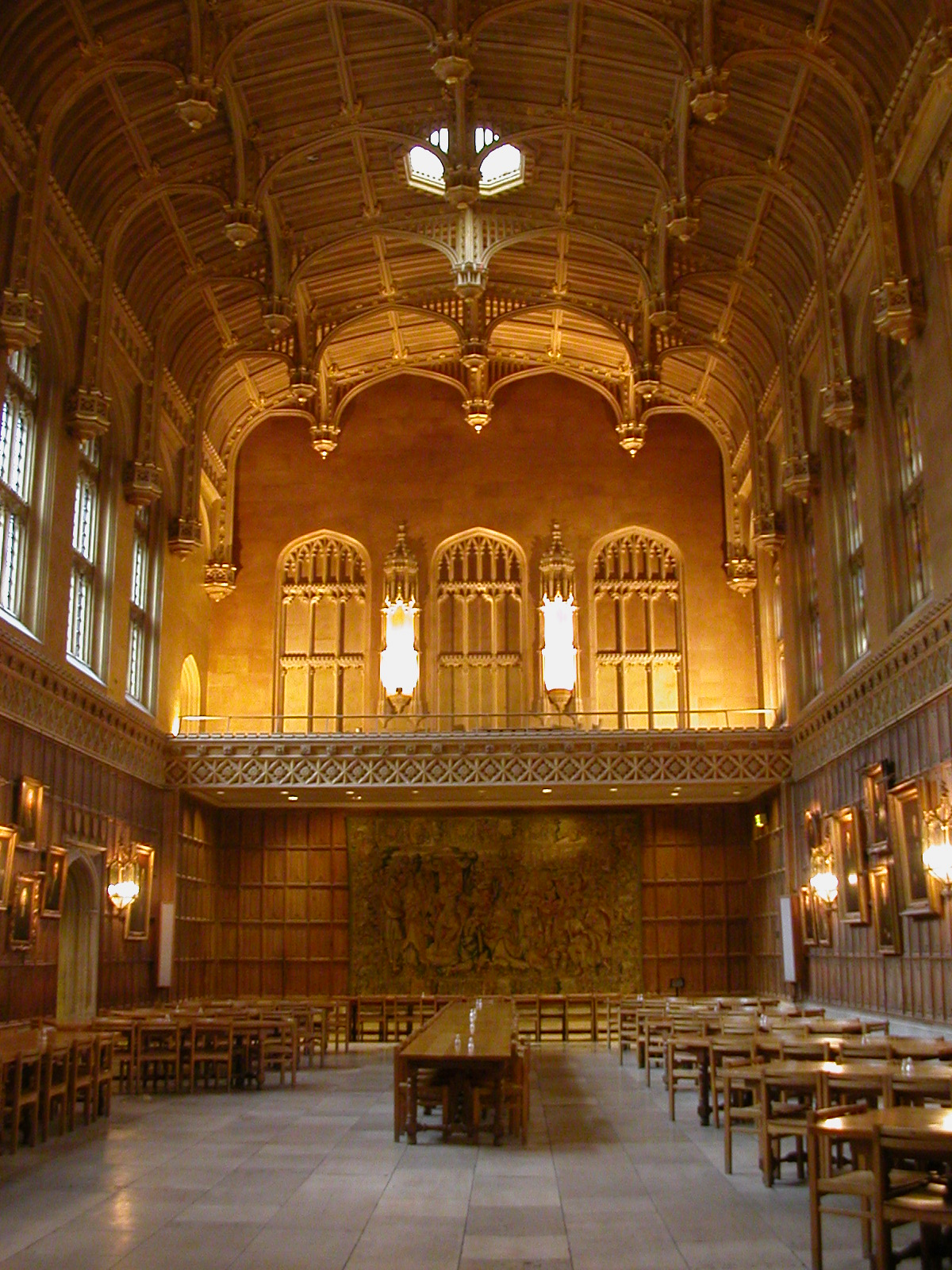
King's College dining hall

King's has its own student unions, both for undergraduates (King's College Student Union or KCSU) and for graduates (King's College Graduate Union or KCGU). Students at King's have used both organisations to assist in the decision-making processes in the college itself and the university. The college students have a reputation for radical political activity going back to the late 1960s, and the college has not infrequently been the centre of demonstrations, rent strikes and so forth, sparked by political events.

There are a number of rooms around college which students can book out to hold society events. Societies who commonly do this include King's Politics, The Turing Maths Society, The History Society, The Marxist Society, Keynes Economics Society and King's Feminist Society.

The main bar at King's is the site of many social events, open mic nights, and informal meetings and debates between students, whilst a venue known as the Bunker (formerly the Cellar), a second bar in a basement of the college, acts occasionally as a music or dance-night venue and most recently the set for a King's Drama productions including Sartre's No Exit and a series of monologue showcase events. Even more recently, the Bunker has been used by the King's Electronic Music Society, allowing students to learn how to DJ.

Whereas many Cambridge colleges celebrate May Week with a May Ball (which actually falls in June), since the early 1980s King's has instead held a June Event (an informal version of a May Ball with fancy dress) known as The King's Affair. This takes place annually on the Wednesday night of May Week (usually around 20 June), and is attended by around 1,500 students, occupying the Front Court, bar, Hall and Chapel. Past performers have included the Stranglers, Fatboy Slim, Noah and the Whale and, in 2009, Clean Bandit. There are also large student-run college parties at the end of each term known as Mingles.

=== Sports ===
King's has a number of competitive and casual sports clubs. King's College Boat Club has the largest active membership of any club in King's. In 2013 the first men's boat qualified to race in the Temple Challenge Cup at the Henley Royal Regatta. After several years of poor performances, the boat club has returned to success in the Lent and May Bumps, with blades being awarded four times in 2023, including twice to the first women's VIII. Another major club is the King's Mountaineering and Kayaking Association, which has a fleet of kayaks for use on the River Cam (which runs through the college) and regularly runs climbing, walking and kayaking trips for students of the college during university vacations. Its rugby team is joint with Corpus Christi and Clare colleges and consequently known as CCK. Its historic crest is the hallowed Elephant of Wisdom.

== Music ==
King's College is home to the Choir of King's College, Cambridge, which was founded in the 15th century and is now one of today's most well-renowned representatives of the English choral tradition. In 2013, the choir launched its own label, King's College Recordings, allowing it to gain more artistic freedom over its releases. Its releases and worldwide fame have led to global tours and performances. The Choir of King's College sings evensong and Eucharist services on all days of the week apart from Mondays, with two services on a Sunday. It is currently led by the incumbent Director of Music, Daniel Hyde.

The other resident choir of the college is the mixed-voice choir King's Voices, founded in October 1997 under Dr John Butt, with the intention of giving women in King's the opportunity to sing in the chapel and be eligible for choral awards within the college. Currently, the choir sings evensong every Monday in university term, as well as performing at King's College Music Society (KCMS) and college events throughout the year. King's Voices has also appeared on albums alongside the Choir of King's College, most recently in the Te Deum and Magnificat of the Collegium Regale service by Herbert Howells on a double album of music by Howells. Sopranos in King's Voices also featured in a live recording of Benjamin Britten's Saint Nicolas alongside the BBC Singers and Britten Sinfonia as part of Sir Stephen Cleobury's Farewell Concert, broadcast on BBC Radio 3 in 2019. The choir's current director is Ben Parry, who is assistant director of Music at King's.

== People associated with King's ==
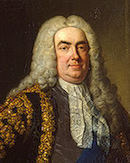
Robert Walpole, first Prime Minister of Great Britain

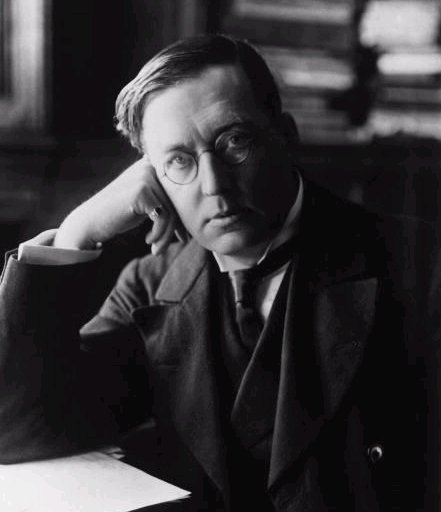
M. R. James, scholar and ghost-story writer

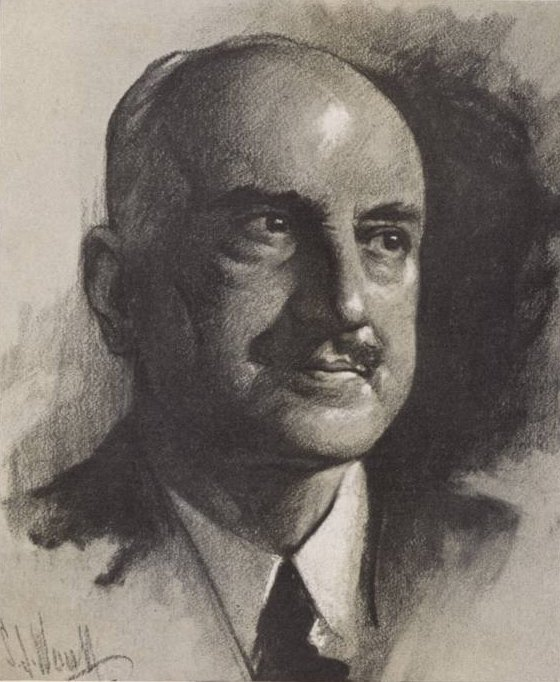
George Santayana, philosopher

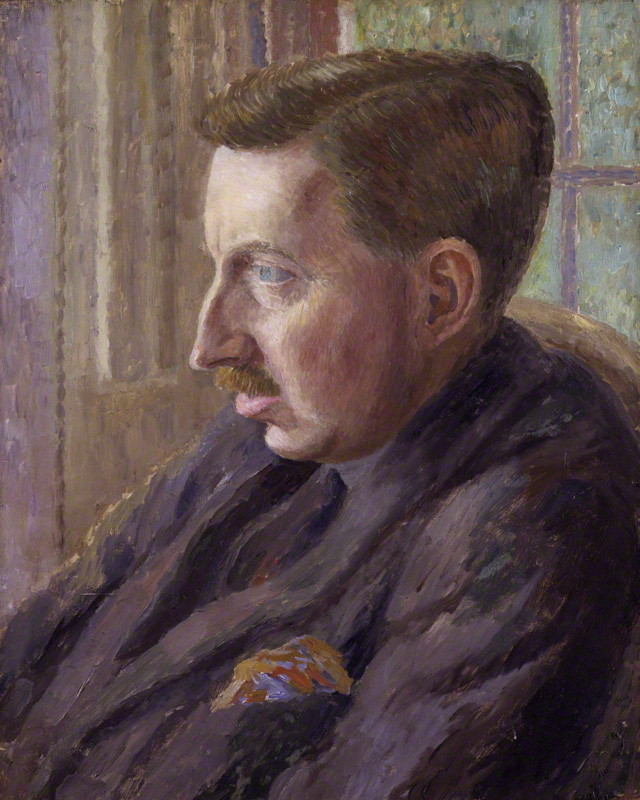
E. M. Forster, novelist

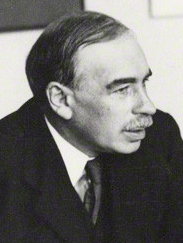
John Maynard Keynes, economist

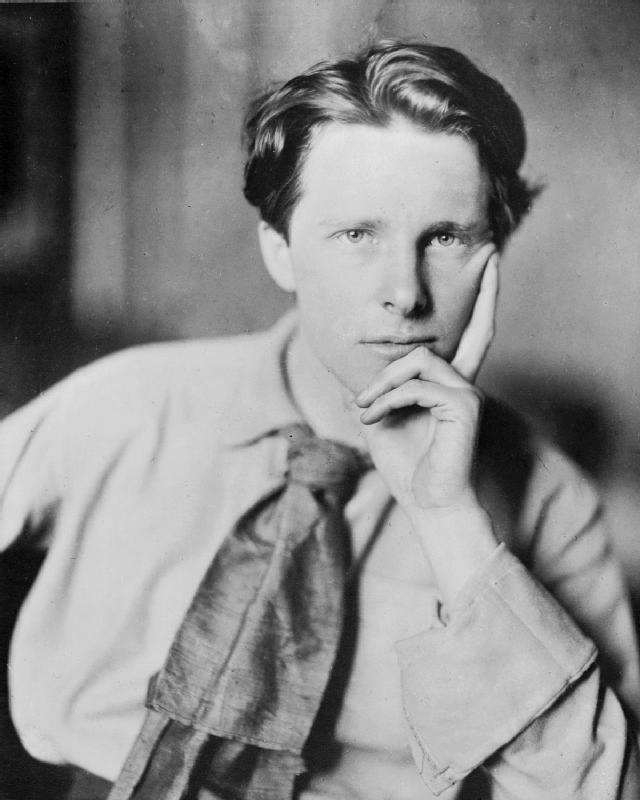
Rupert Brooke, poet

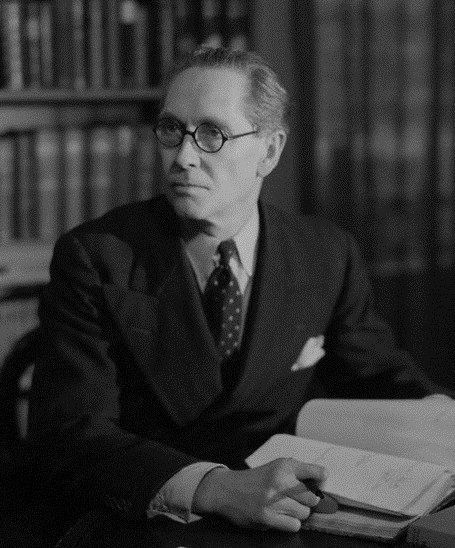
Philip Noel-Baker, Olympic medallist and Nobel laureate in peace

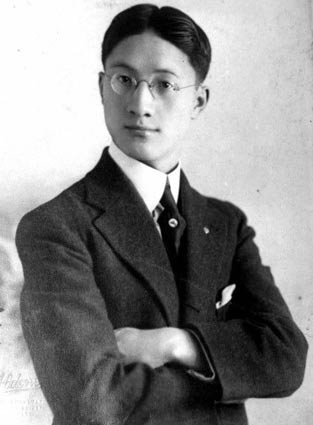
Xu Zhimo, poet

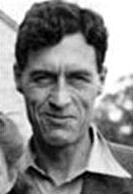
Patrick Blackett, Nobel laureate in physics

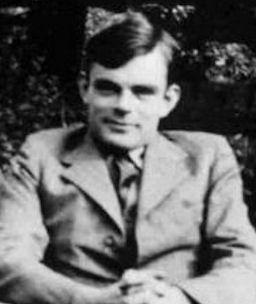
Alan Turing, mathematician and computer scientist

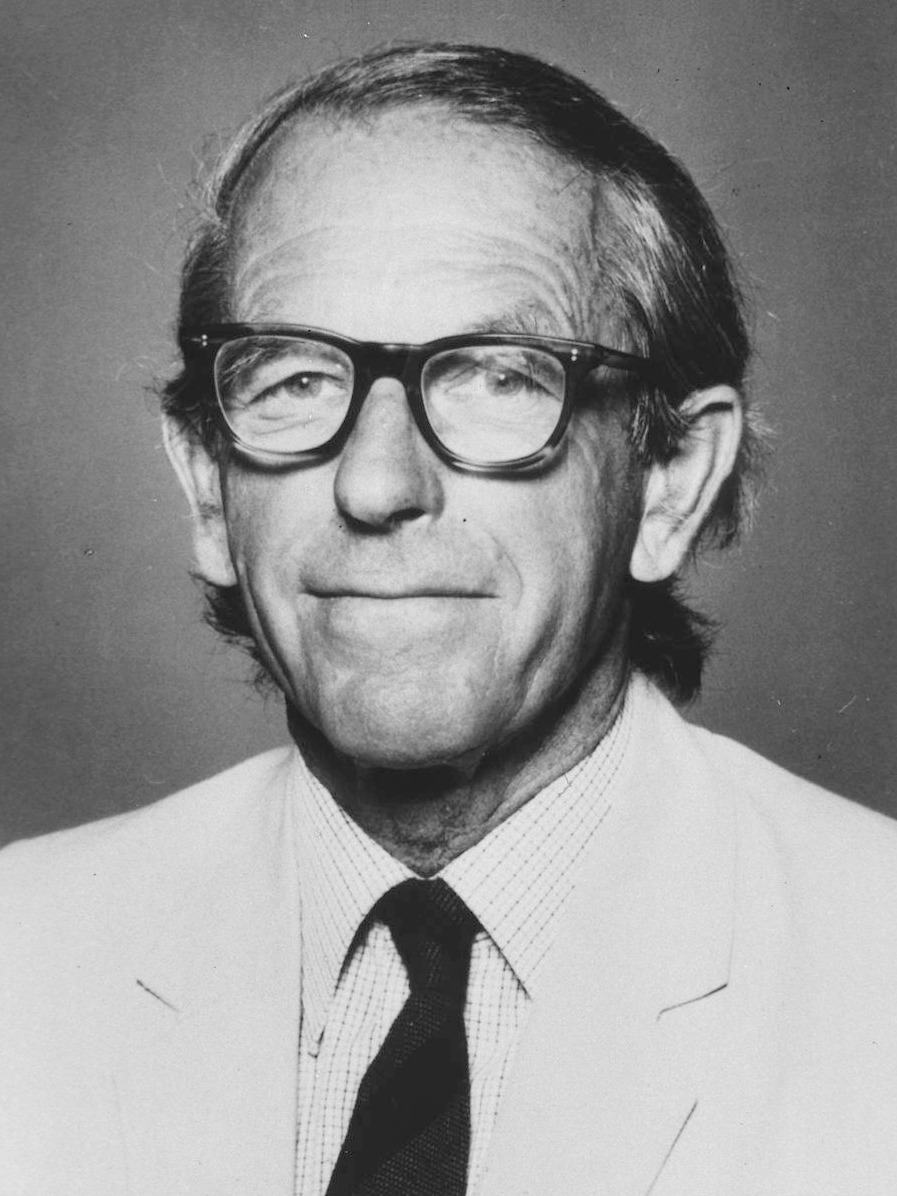
Frederick Sanger, double Nobel laureate in Chemistry

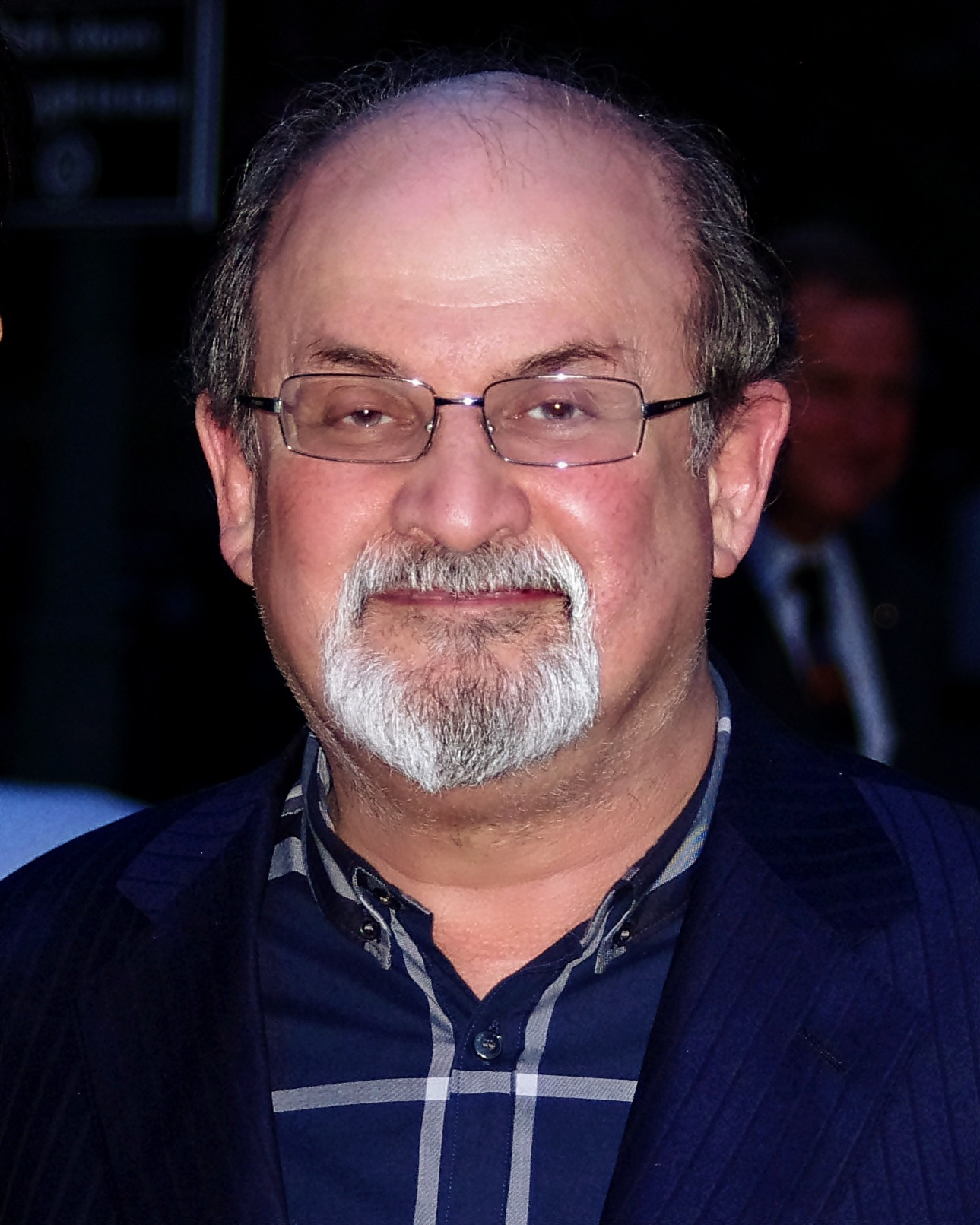
Salman Rushdie, novelist

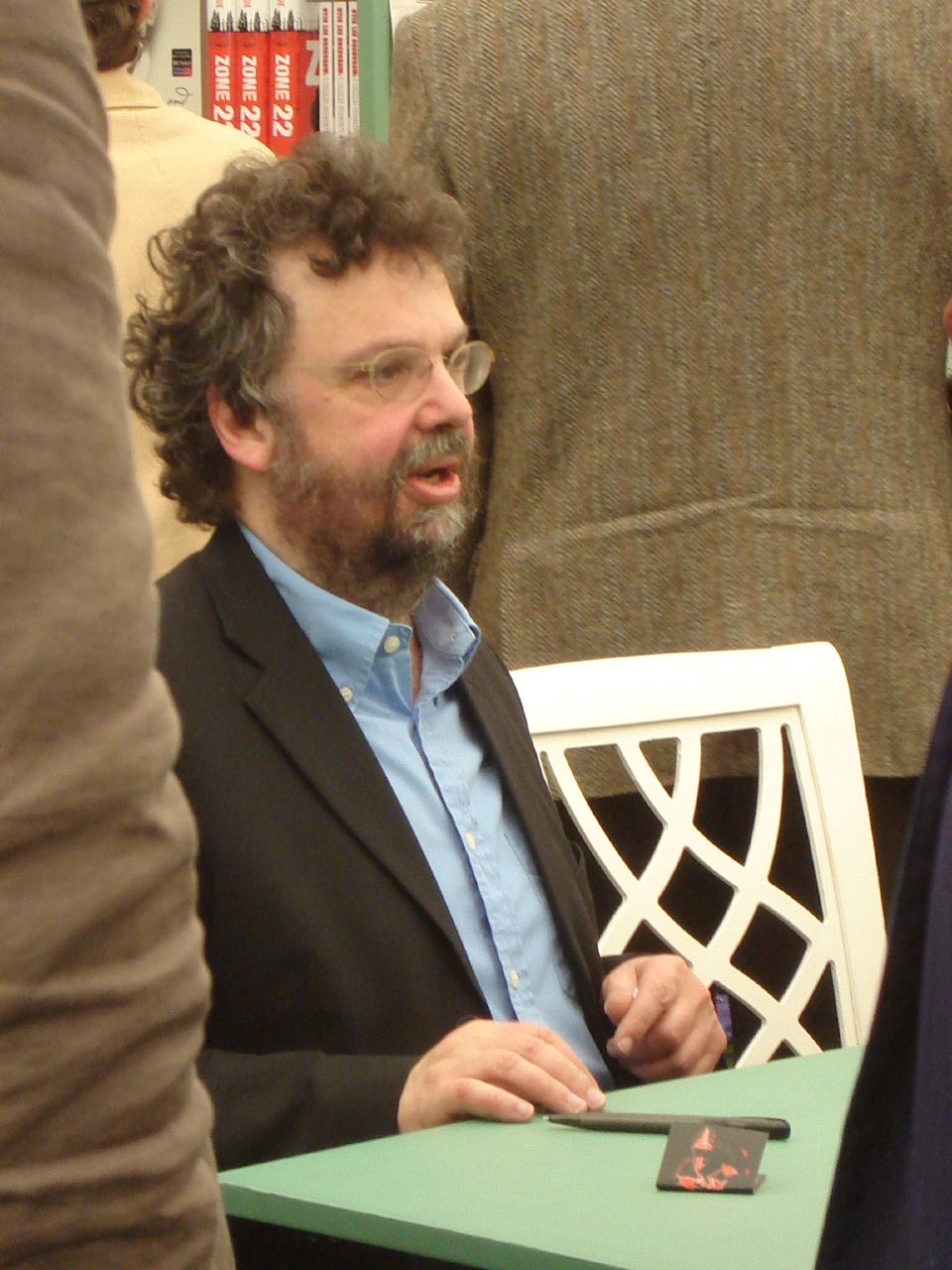
Stephen Poliakoff, playwright and director

Mervyn King, former Governor of the Bank of England

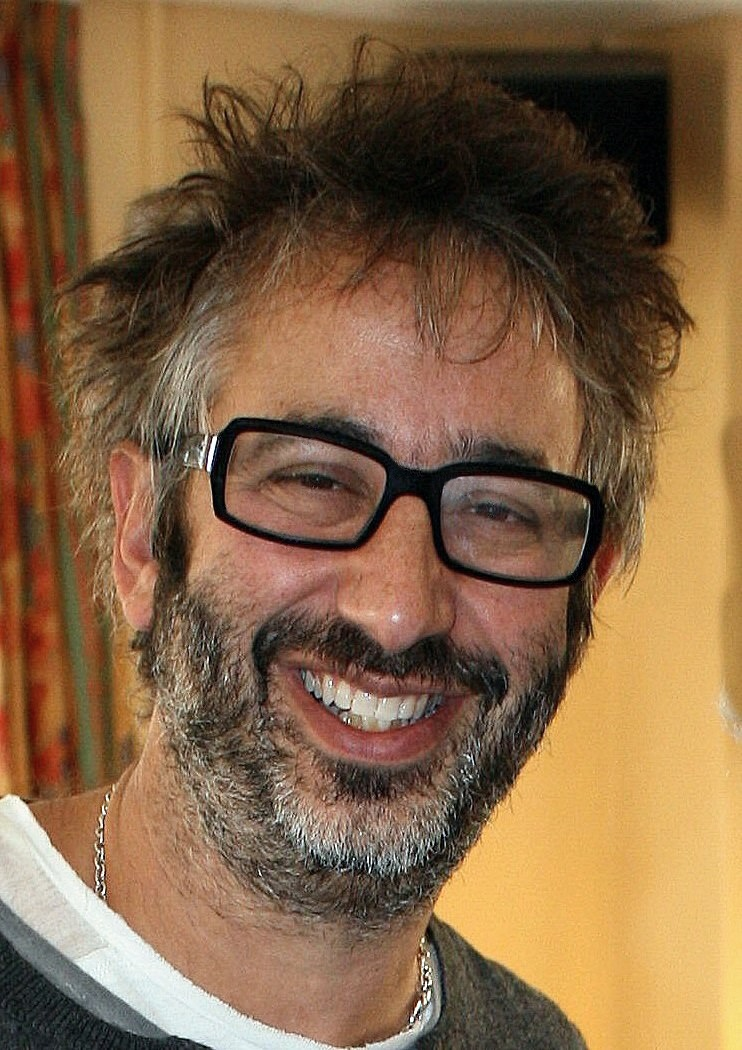
David Baddiel, comedian

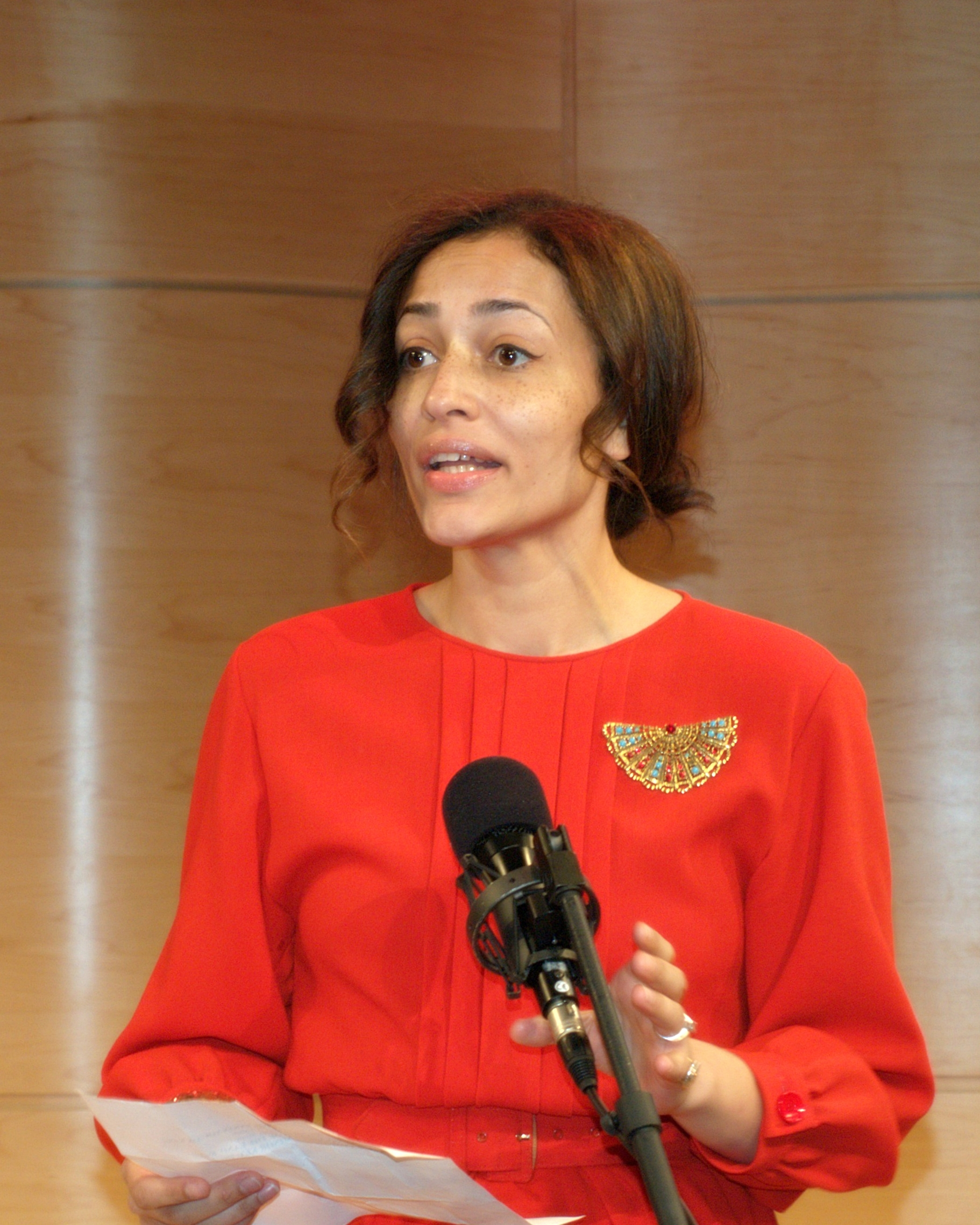
Zadie Smith, novelist

Once someone has been admitted to the college, they become a member for life. Alumni of the college includes prime ministers, archbishops, presidents and academics. Time published in 1999 a list of what it considered the most "influential and important" people of the 20th century. In a list of one hundred names, King's claimed two: Alan Turing and John Maynard Keynes who had been both students and fellows at the college.

Heads of State and Government educated at King's include the first Prime Minister of Great Britain, Robert Walpole. Also in the 18th century, alumni include the Secretary of State Charles Townshend, 2nd Viscount Townshend (Turnip Townshend), who was also known for his interest in agriculture and his role in the British Agricultural Revolution, the judge and Lord Chancellor Charles Pratt, 1st Earl Camden. Historical figures include Francis Walsingham, spymaster to Queen Elizabeth.

Politicians educated at King's include the former British Home Secretary Charles Clarke, the peer and Chancellor of the University of Cambridge David Sainsbury, Baron Sainsbury of Turville, and Martin Bell.

In law, alumni include the barrister and vice-chancellor Robert Alexander, Baron Alexander of Weedon, and the former President of the British Supreme Court Nicholas Phillips, Baron Phillips of Worth Matravers.

Alumni in religion include William Thomas, the 16th-century Protestant martyr John Frith, the Archbishop of Canterbury John Sumner, and Richard Cox, who served as Chancellor of Oxford before appointment as Dean of Westminster and eventually Bishop of Ely.

Notable alumni in literature and poetry include the authors Zadie Smith, Salman Rushdie, Martin Jacques, J. G. Ballard and E. M. Forster, the Nobel Prize winner Patrick White, the poets Rupert Brooke, Walter Raleigh and Xu Zhimo, and the playwright Stephen Poliakoff. The ghost story writer and medievalist M. R. James spent much of his life at King's as a student, fellow and Provost. The author and translator of Aristotle Sir John Harington is also an alumnus, and a benefactor of mankind for having invented the flush toilet.

In the arts, alumni include the philosopher George Santayana; the historians Benedict Anderson, Eric Hobsbawm and Tony Judt; composers George Benjamin, Judith Weir (Master of the Queen's Music), Thomas Ades, and Julian Anderson; the original members of the Grammy Award-winning a cappella group King's Singers; the folk musician John Spiers; the comedians David Baddiel and Phil Wang; the model Lily Cole; the tenor James Gilchrist; and the countertenor John Whitworth.

In the sciences and social sciences, King's alumni include the British sociologist Anthony Giddens, the physicist Patrick Blackett, the chemist Frederick Sanger, the psychologist Edgar Anstey, the palaeontologist Richard Fortey, the economist John Craven, the political theorist John Dunn, the engineer Charles Inglis, and the mathematician and eugenicist Karl Pearson. The Governor of the Bank of England Mervyn King was also educated at King's. The technology entrepreneur Hermann Hauser, of Acorn and ARM, studied postgraduate physics there.

Of the current fellows of King's prominent fellows include Whitehead and Adams' Prize Winner Clément Mouhot and the Fellow of the Royal Society and Clay Research award winner Mark Gross.

=== Nobel laureates ===
There are nine Nobel laureates who were either students or fellows of King's:

- Charles Glover Barkla was awarded the Nobel Prize in Physics 1917 "for his discovery of the characteristic Röntgen radiation of the elements".
- Patrick Blackett, fellow of King's, was awarded the Nobel Prize in Physics 1948 "for his development of the Wilson cloud chamber method, and his discoveries therewith in the fields of nuclear physics and cosmic radiation".
- Frederick Sanger, fellow of King's, was awarded the Nobel Prize in Chemistry 1958 "for his work on the structure of proteins, especially that of insulin". Sanger was awarded his second Nobel Prize in Chemistry in 1980 jointly with Walter Gilbert for "their contributions concerning the determination of base sequences in nucleic acids". Sanger is one of only five people to have won a Nobel Prize twice, and the only affiliate of the University of Cambridge to have done so.
- Philip Noel-Baker was awarded the Nobel Peace Prize 1959 for work towards global disarmament.
- Patrick White was awarded the Nobel Prize in Literature 1973 "for an epic and psychological narrative art which has introduced a new continent into literature".
- Richard Stone, fellow of King's, was awarded the Nobel Memorial Prize in Economic Sciences 1984 "for having made fundamental contributions to the development of systems of national accounts and hence greatly improved the basis for empirical economic analysis".
- Sydney Brenner, fellow of King's, was awarded the Nobel Prize in Physiology or Medicine 2002 jointly with H. Robert Horvitz and John E. Sulston "for their discoveries concerning genetic regulation of organ development and programmed cell death".
- Oliver Hart was awarded the Nobel Memorial Prize in Economic Sciences 2016 jointly with Bengt Holmström "for their contributions to contract theory".
- Geoffrey Hinton was awarded the Nobel Prize in Physics 2024 jointly with John Hopfield for using "tools from physics to develop methods that are the foundation of today's powerful machine learning".

=== Provosts ===
The head of King's College is called the Provost. The current Provost, as of 2023, is Dr Gillian Tett, a British author and journalist.

=== Visitor ===
The visitor of the college is the Bishop of Lincoln.

== Arms ==
Coat of arms of King's College, Cambridge
Notes King's was granted its arms on the same day as its sister foundation Eton College. The two shields are identical, save that King's has three white roses, and Eton three white lilies. A version of the arms with the roses argent, barbed and seeded proper (i.e. white or silver, with green barbs and yellow seeds) is often used, though the blazon simply describes the roses as argent. The embellished shield can be seen in the box at the top-right of this page. Adopted 1448/9 Escutcheon Sable, three roses argent, a chief per pale azure and gules charged on the dexter side with a fleur-de-lis and on the sinister with a lion passant gardant Or. Symbolism In the grant of arms, the black field is described as symbolising the stability of the college; the roses are described as symbolising the bringing forth of the flowers of knowledge; and the fleur-de-lis and lion represent the royalty of King's foundation by Henry VI, referring to the Kingdoms of France and England respectively. Furthermore, white roses are traditionally a symbol of the Virgin Mary, one of the patron saints of King's. Previous versions Before the granting of the current arms, King's used a very similar design. The previous shield had two white lilies instead of the outer roses, and a pastoral staff encircled by a mitre instead of the bottom rose. The two lilies represented St Mary, and the bishop's regalia represented St Nicholas.

== See also ==
- Trinity College, Cambridge
