= Ben Parry (musician) =

British musician, composer, conductor, singer, arranger and producer

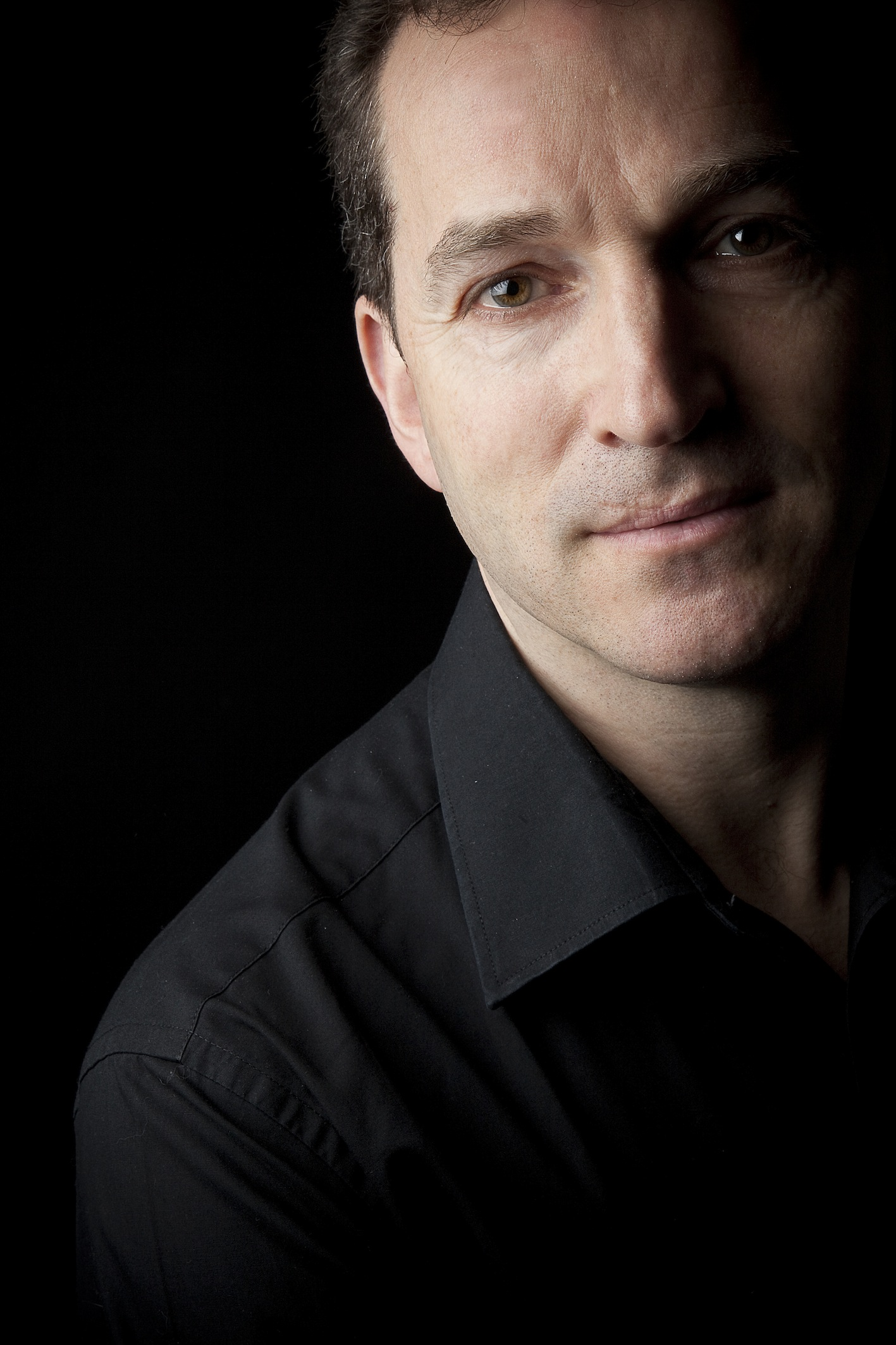
- Parry in 2013
- Born: 25 January 1965 (age 61); Ipswich, Suffolk, England
- Education: St Catharine's College, Cambridge
- Occupations: Choral conductor; Composer; Singer; producer
- Organizations: Choir of King's College, Cambridge; The Swingle Singers; Dunedin Consort; Scottish Chamber Orchestra choir; London Voices; National Youth Choir; King's Voices
- Website: www.benparry.net

Ben Parry (born 25 January 1965) is a British musician, composer, conductor, singer, arranger and producer. He is the director of London Voices and was formerly artistic director of the National Youth Choir.

== Early life ==
Ben was born and raised in Ipswich, Suffolk, England, where his father was an organist and music teacher. He studied at Ipswich School and St Catharine's College of the University of Cambridge, where he was a choral scholar. He sang for two years in the Choir of King's College, Cambridge and performed in many musicals and cabarets.

== Career ==
Early in his career, he was a singer and arranger with The Swingle Singers. With the group, he toured the world and worked with musicians including Pierre Boulez, Luciano Berio and Stephane Grapelli. He wrote over 50 arrangements and compositions for the group and co-produced their recordings for EMI and Virgin Classics.

In 1994, Parry was in the original London production of Cy Coleman's City of Angels at the Prince of Wales Theatre in the West End. In 1995, he and his family moved to Scotland. There, he co-founded the distinguished vocal ensemble, Dunedin Consort, and directed performances at festivals in the UK, Spain, Belgium, France and Canada. He was chorusmaster of the Scottish Chamber Orchestra Chorus and director of choral music at the Royal Scottish Academy of Music and Drama (now the Royal Conservatoire of Scotland) in Glasgow. He directed five productions for Haddo House Opera.

From 2003 to 2008, Parry was director of music at St Paul's School, London. He subsequently moved to Suffolk and took up the post of director at the Junior Academy at the Royal Academy of Music in London, combined with his freelance career. He is director of the professional choir, London Voices, who have been at the forefront of choral singing in the UK since their foundation by conductor Terry Edwards in 1973. The choir has performed on the soundtracks of major films, including "The Hobbit", The Lord of the Rings, Star Wars, the Harry Potter series, Spectre, Aladdin and Jurassic World. The choir has performed and recorded with major artists, including Paul McCartney, Sting (musician), Sam Smith, Gary Barlow, Jacob Collier, Florence Welch, Dave Brubeck, Bryn Terfel, Angela Gheorghiu and Renée Fleming.

He was assistant director of music at King's College, Cambridge from 2013 to 2021, in which role he directed King's Voices.

Parry has composed a significant amount of choral music, published by Faber, OUP and Edition Peters. He collaborates regularly with author and lyricist Garth Bardsley, and together they have had works premiered by the BBC Singers, Sheffield Cathedral, Aldeburgh Voices, BBC Singers, St Andrew's University, Chelmsford Cathedral, National Youth Choirs of Great Britain and London Voices. They are currently developing a new theatre piece for baritone and instrumental ensemble.

As a conductor, Parry has worked with the Academy of Ancient Music, Britten Sinfonia, City of Birmingham Symphony Orchestra, English Chamber Orchestra, London Symphony Orchestra, London Philharmonic Orchestra, London Mozart Players, Scottish Chamber Orchestra, BBC Concert Orchestra, Royal Seville Symphony Orchestra, Scottish Ensemble, National Youth Orchestra of Wales, Cumbria Youth Orchestra and the Vancouver Youth Symphony. He has sung with the Taverner Consort, Gabrieli Consort, Schütz Choir of London and Tenebrae (choir).

In October 2012 Parry was appointed director of the National Youth Choir (NYCGB). In 2016 he appointed a new chief executive, Anne Besford, to run the organisation, retaining the roles of artistic director and principal conductor. In 2023, after 11 years at the helm of NYCGB, he stood down, first as artistic director (replaced by Lucy Hollins as creative director) then as principal conductor (succeeded by Nicholas Chalmers) to devote more time to his freelance work, most principally as director of London Voices, and to composing. He was made an honorary associate of the Royal Academy of Music in 2013 for his services to the music industry.

Parry has made over 200 recordings for EMI, Decca, Collegium, Virgin, Linn and Signum.

== Personal life ==
Parry is married to violinist Kathryn Parry. They have three children.

== Selected discography ==
- Choir of Royal Holloway 'The Hours' - Choral Music by Ben Parry' (Signum Classics 2020) - composer
- Choir of Selwyn College, Cambridge 'Christmas Music by Ben Parry' (Regent Records 2019) - composer
- King's College Choir: William Byrd Great Service (EMI 1987) – singer
- Cy Coleman: City of Angels: original London cast recording (1st Night 1994) – soloist
- Taverner Consort: Purcell Dido and Aeneas (BBC/Sony 1995) – soloist
- Gabrieli Consort: Music for San Rocco (DG Archiv 1996) – singer
- Dunedin Consort: Copland/Barber In the Beginning (Linn 2000) – conductor
- Scottish Chamber Orchestra/Mackerras: Mozart Requiem (Linn 2003) – chorusmaster
- Paul McCartney: Ecce Cor Meum (EMI 2006) – chorusmaster
- Tenebrae: Prayers for Mankind (Signum 2010) – producer
- Coldplay: When I Need a Friend (Everyday Life) – conductor
- Ryan Gosling: I'm Just Ken (Barbie the Album) – choirmaster
- Dune: Part Two - choir conductor
- Project Hail Mary - choir conductor
