= National Youth Choir =

British family of youth choirs

- Choir
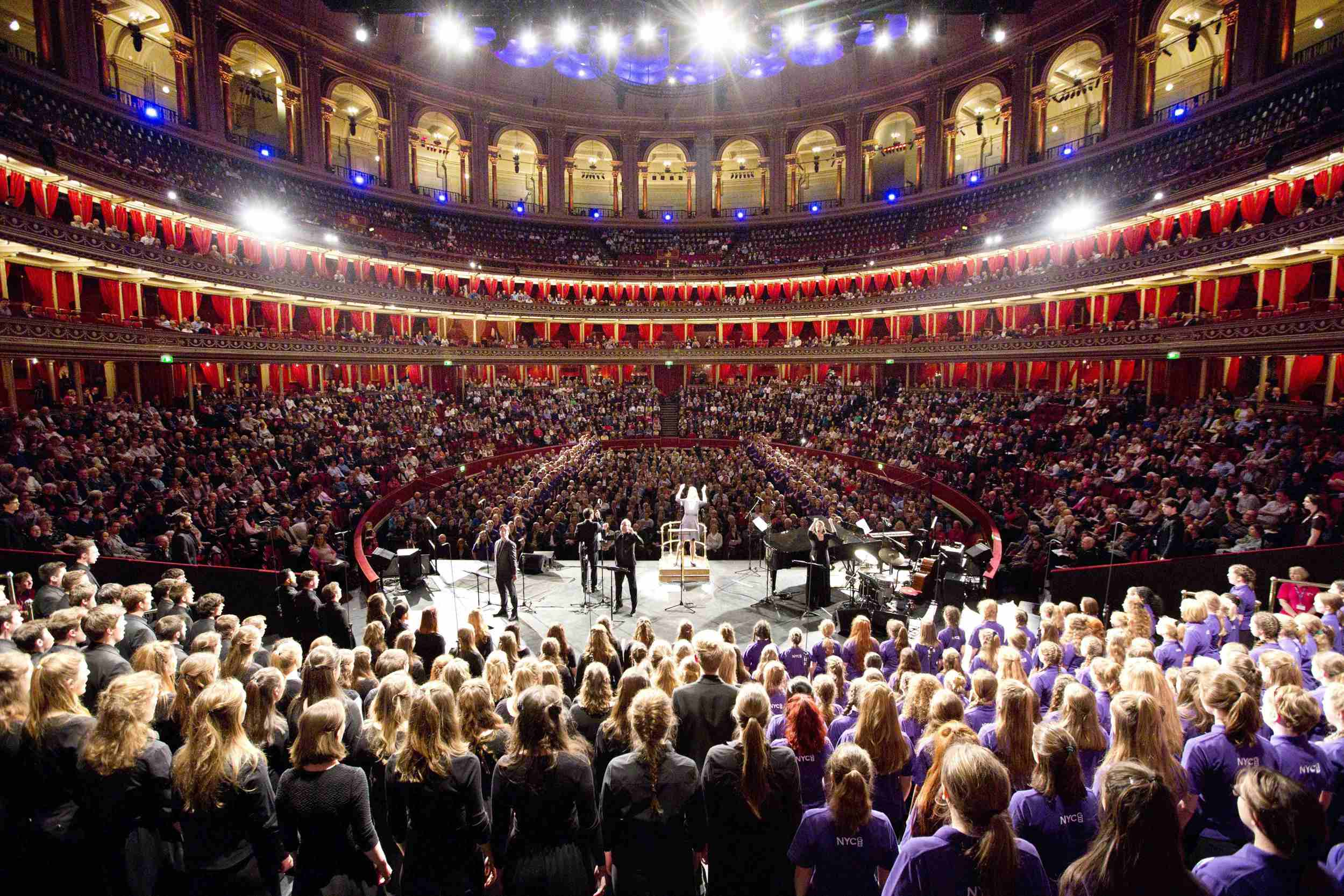
- National Youth Choir at the Royal Albert Hall in 2016.
- Also known as: NYC
- Former name: National Youth Choirs of Great Britain, British Youth Choir
- Founded: 1983
- Artistic Director: Lucy Hollins
- Chief conductor: Nicholas Chalmers, Matthew Quinn, Lynsey Callaghan
- Headquarters: Durham, England
- Label: NYCR, NMC, Decca, Delphian, Sony, Signum & others
- Website: www.nationalyouthchoir.org.uk

The National Youth Choir, formerly known as the National Youth Choirs of Great Britain and the British Youth Choir, is a family of choirs for outstanding young singers, and those with outstanding potential, in the United Kingdom. It comprises five choirs for around 900 children and young people between the ages of 9 and 25:

- National Youth Choir (9–15 years), formerly National Youth Girls' and Boys' Choir of Great Britain
- National Youth Choir (15–18 years), formerly National Youth Training Choir of Great Britain
- National Youth Choir (18–25 years), formerly National Youth Choir of Great Britain
- National Youth Voices, formerly Laudibus and National Youth Chamber Choir (18–25 years)

The National Youth Choir also has a number of additional programmes and schemes, including its three Emerging Professional Artist programmes, the Fellowship, Young Conductors and Young Composers schemes, and its Learning & Engagement programme.

The organisation also has a strong community of over 1,000 former members, National Youth Choir Alumni, who often participate in performances alongside National Youth Choir's flagship choirs.

== Background and performance history ==
The National Youth Choir was founded in 1983 by Carl Browning, with its five choirs have a membership of over 900 young singers aged 9 to 25 from across the UK.

The NYC regularly gives performances at venues and festivals such as the Royal Albert Hall, the Royal Festival Hall, The Glasshouse, Gateshead, the Royal Concert Hall Nottingham, Edinburgh Festival, Snape Proms, the Royal Variety Performance and the BBC Proms as well as at events of national significance. High-profile international artists NYC has worked with range from Daniel Barenboim to Kylie Minogue & Melanie C, along with top choirs including The Sixteen, Tenebrae, The Tallis Scholars, BBC Singers and many others. The music it creates and performs encompasses a wide diversity of genres and vocal styles, and NYC regularly creates and releases audio and video recordings on its own record label, National Youth Choir Recordings, and online platforms.

NYC also supports the development of emerging young professionals through its Fellowship programme for future choral leaders and performers, its Young Composers scheme and its Young Conductors programme (launched in 2024).

== Musical directors and conductors ==
=== Current creative director ===
Lucy Hollins was appointed Creative Director of National Youth Choir in Spring 2023, succeeding Ben Parry, who held the position from 2012 to 2022.

=== Current principal conductors ===
- National Youth Choir (18–25 years) & National Youth Voices: Nicholas Chalmers
- National Youth Choir (15–18 years): Matthew Quinn
- National Youth Choir (9–15 years): Lynsey Callaghan

=== Current conductors ===
- National Youth Choir (9-15 years): Patrick Barrett, Mariana Rosas & Matthew Roughley

=== Former conductors and musical directors ===
- Mike Brewer
- Ben Parry
- Greg Hallam
- Robbie Jacobs
- Esther Jones
- Dominic Ellis Peckham
- Rachel Staunton
- Greg Beardsell
- Joanna Tomlinson
- Lucy Joy Morris

== Recordings ==
National Youth Choir operates its own record label, National Youth Choir Recordings (NYCR), which releases music recorded by its choirs via Spotify, Apple Music, YouTube Music and other major music streaming services. The label was started in 2015 and publishes new recordings each month, which are regularly featured on playlists curated by each streaming platform's editorial team, as well as being broadcast on national radio stations, including BBC Radio 3, Classic FM and Scala.

Prior to 2015, National Youth Choir's recordings were primarily released on record labels including Delphian, Priory and EMI. The Choirs have also performed on discs for Decca, Classic FM and Signum Records, most notably including the premiere recording of Karl Jenkins' The Armed Man: A Mass for Peace (2001).

National Youth Choir also partners with NMC Recordings to produce its annual "Young Composers" albums: a set of pieces for singers aged 18 to 25 and NYC's Fellowship Ensemble composed by that year's cohort of young composers.

== Notable former members ==
- Rich Batsford – pianist, composer and singer-songwriter
- James Burton – conductor and composer
- Karen Danzig – singer/songwriter
- Rae Hendrie – actress
- Andrew Johnston – came third in Britain's Got Talent
- Jon Robyns – West End star of Les Misérables and Avenue Q
- Ben Thapa of G4 (band)
