= King's Voices =

English choir

King's Voices is an English choir, and is the mixed-voice chapel choir of King's College, Cambridge. It is a resident choir to the college's chapel, alongside the Choir of King's College, Cambridge.

== Foundation and role in college ==
The choir was founded in October 1997 under the direction of Dr John Butt, then Director of Studies of Music at the College. The primary aim of the choir was to give female students to opportunity to sing in the chapel, and it renders female King's students able to audition for choral awards. This is not, however, a requirement to sing in the choir, and most members are volunteers (i.e. they do not hold an award). The choir is also open to singers from other colleges, as well as staff and fellows from within the college. The majority of the choir are King's students (both undergraduate and postgraduate), however.

The choir sings evensong on Mondays in the University term. In addition to this, other services such as compline are occasionally sung by King's Voices. The choir also performs a mix of sacred and secular music elsewhere in the college throughout the year, in King's College Music Society (KCMS) concerts, as well as at other college events such as dinners. Outside of King's, the choir also participates in concerts and services in and around Cambridge and East Anglia such as Great St Mary's Church and Ely Cathedral, as well as in other locations such as St. George's Chapel, Windsor, and St Mary Magdalene, Richmond (this occasion being a concert for International Women's Day). The choir also tours once a year, around Easter time, giving concert and radio performances.

Until 2022, the director was Ben Parry, a former choral scholar, and Assistant Director of Music at King's. He took over in 2013 from Simon Brown (who took over from John Butt in 2001). Ralph Woodward took over as interim Assistant Director in 2022 until 2025. As of January 2026, the choir is run by Owen Elsley.

== Previous tours and appearances ==
=== Tours ===
The first King's Voices tour was in 2001, which was an exchange trip with the University Choir of Cologne. Since then, the choir has toured every year, with the exception of 2020, where the planned tour to Portugal was cancelled due to the Coronavirus Pandemic. King's Voices give concert and radio performances in various locations during each tour; in 2003, the tour to Paris included concert performances at Notre-Dame de Paris and La Madeleine.

King's Voices Tour Locations by Year
Year	Location
2001	Exchange trip with University Choir of Cologne
2002	Venice
2003	Paris
2004	Amsterdam
2005	Brussels
2006	Rome
2007	Dublin
2008	Copenhagen
2009	Barcelona
2010	Bologna
2011	Malta
2012	Ariège and Toulouse
2013	Berlin
2014	Verona
2015	Salzburg
2016	Amsterdam
2017	Dublin
2018	Iceland
2019	Pavia
2020	Coimbra and Lisbon- cancelled due to COVID-19
2023	Ipswich
2024	Brussels and Leuven
2025	Dublin and Belfast
2026	Warsaw and Kraków

=== Radio and album appearances ===
King's Voices have featured in a number of radio and album performances both domestically and abroad. The most recent album appearance was under the King's College record label, singing Herbert Howells' Te Deum and Magnificat from the Collegium Regale service alongside the college choir on an album of music by Howells. On their 2019 tour, the choir made an appearance on Italian National Radio, singing a selection of unaccompanied pieces on Rai Radio 3 Classica. Sopranos in King's Voices also appeared in a concert recording on BBC Radio 3 in July 2019, alongside the BBC Singers and Britten Sinfonia as part of a farewell concert for Sir Stephen Cleobury.
