= Michael C. Brewer =

British music teacher

Michael Curtis Brewer (born 1945) is a convicted sex offender and former British music teacher and choral conductor. He was the founding musical director of the National Youth Choirs of Great Britain and had been Director of Music for Chetham's School of Music in the 1980s and early 1990s. He was appointed an Officer of the Order of the British Empire in 1995, but was stripped of the honour in 2013 following his conviction on five counts of indecent assault against a girl who had been one of his pupils. He was jailed for six years.

== Life and career ==
Brewer began his career as a schoolteacher. In 1966 he was appointed Head of Music at the Royal Liberty Grammar School in Romford, London, where he established a large choir. During his time in Romford, he also founded the Havering Youth Choir. In 1969 he co-wrote an opera, The Sword In The Stone, a modern work based upon the legend of King Arthur. In 1970 he moved to become Head of Music at The Latymer School and was later Director of Music for Chetham's School of Music.

In 1983 he founded with Carl Browning the National Youth Choir of Great Britain. Brewer also worked as a consultant for various UK choirs and was adjudicator for the finals of "Choir of the Year" and the National Festival of Music for Youth in the UK and in international competitions. In 1983, he conducted The World Youth Choir and was later a guest judge on the BBC programme Last Choir Standing. He was appointed an Officer of the Order of the British Empire in 1995.

=== Conviction ===
On 8 February 2013, Brewer and his former wife, Hilary Kay Brewer, were both found guilty of indecently assaulting a pupil at Chetham's School of Music between 1978 (when she was 14) and 1982. A fortnight earlier, on 24 January 2013, the victim had died of an overdose of antidepressants after giving evidence during the trial; it was unclear whether the overdose was accidental or she had committed suicide. It was claimed by prosecutors that in a separate incident Brewer had been forced to resign from Chetham's in the 1990s after an inappropriate relationship with a 17-year-old girl. In March 2013, Judge Martin Rudland sentenced Michael Brewer to six years' imprisonment on five counts of indecent assault; he sentenced Hilary Brewer to 21 months. On 28 May 2013, Brewer was stripped of his OBE.
