= Simon Brown (musician) =

British composer

Simon Brown was the director of music at King's College School in Cambridge from 1999 to 2014. and was the director of King's Voices from 2001 to 2013. He was a choral scholar in King's College Choir in the late 1970s, and since then has sung in the choirs of New College, Oxford, Winchester Cathedral, Westminster Abbey and Her Majesty's Chapels Royal (St James' Palace). His teaching career began at Bradford Grammar School in Yorkshire, and was followed by 12 years as Head of Academic and Choral Music at the Purcell School. His time at the Purcell School included conducting the youngest ever choir to sing Tallis' 40-part choral work Spem in alium.

Brown's work with King's Voices included evensongs in chapel on Mondays in full term, visits to Ely Cathedral and St George's Chapel, Windsor, and tours to Venice, Florence, Paris, Amsterdam, Brussels, Dublin, Copenhagen, Bologna, Rome, Malta, Barcelona, Toulouse and Berlin. Brown is also a composer; his introit Thee We Adore, O Hidden Saviour, Thee was premiered on BBC Radio 3's Choral Evensong in 2006, and his carol There is no rose was sung in the Advent Procession at York Minster in 2011. He plays several instruments, including recorder, viola, clarinet and harp, and holds ABRSM Grade 8 qualifications in wind and string instruments of the symphony orchestra, as well as piano.

From 2015 to 2022, Brown was Director of Chapel Music at Robinson College, Cambridge.
