= Carols for Choirs =

Books of choral music, mainly for Christmas

- Covers of the original editions of Carols for Choirs post 1970
- Editors: Sir David Willcocks, Reginald Jacques, John Rutter and Bob Chilcott
- Cover artist: Alfred Daniels; John Grandidge
- Language: English
- Publisher: Oxford University Press
- Publication date: 1961 (Vol 1)
- Publication place: United Kingdom
- Media type: Print (paperback)
- Pages: 360 (Vol 1)
- ISBN: 9780193532229 (Vol 1)
- Website: Carols for Choirs on OUP.com

Carols for Choirs is a collection of choral scores, predominantly of Christmas carols and hymns, widely used by English-speaking choirs.

Published from 1961 by Oxford University Press, the first volume was edited by Sir David Willcocks and Reginald Jacques, with a second volume following in 1970, edited by David Willcocks and John Rutter. The series now contains six volumes, plus a compendium edition.

In addition to music for Christmas, the collection also offers works that are suitable for other Christian festivals such as Advent and Epiphany.

The books contain choral arrangements of traditional and some specially composed carols. Some include descants by the editors (mainly Willcocks) which have become standard in the Anglican communion in the UK. Most of the first volume's arrangements were originally written for use by the Choir of King's College, Cambridge or the Bach Choir in London.

== History ==
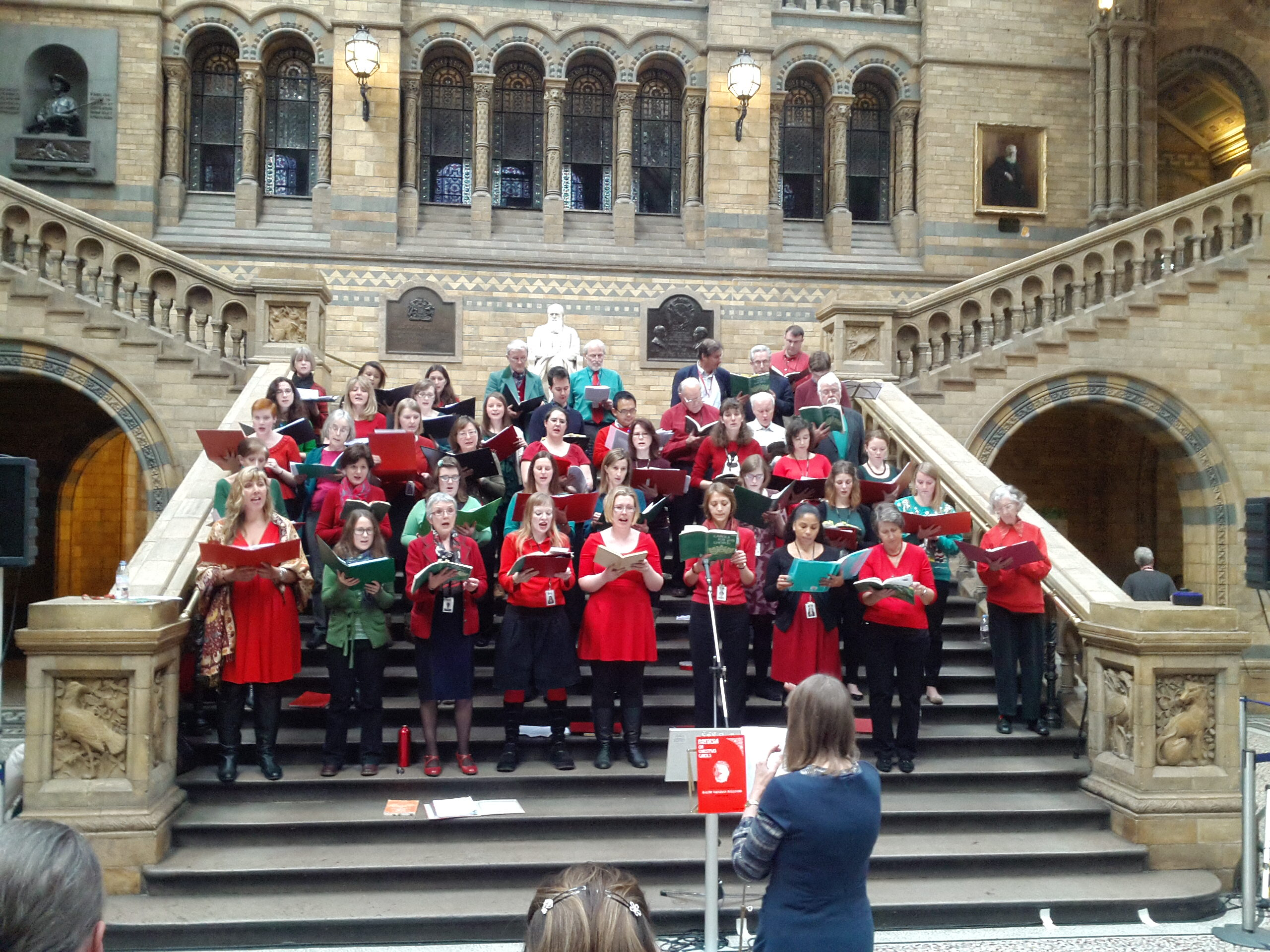
A choir singing from Carols for Choirs in the Natural History Museum, London

Carols For Choirs was originally commissioned by the organist and music editor at Oxford University Press Christopher Morris. Whilst working at St George's, Hanover Square, he realised that church choirs lacked a definitive book of Christmas carols, and felt that a single book would be more convenient than using separate pieces of sheet music and hymn books. The book was originally to be called Carols for Concerts. To edit the collection, Morris enlisted David Willcocks, Director of Music at King's College, Cambridge, and Reginald Jacques, conductor of the Bach Choir. The book was published in 1961, containing new arrangements of traditional carols, but it also popularised pieces by modern composers such as William Walton, Benjamin Britten, Richard Rodney Bennett, William Mathias and John Rutter. Carols for Choirs was an instant success and became OUP Music Department's best-selling title, with over a million copies being sold. OUP were keen to commission a second volume, but after the death of Jacques in 1969, a new editor had to be found to support Willcocks, and an undergraduate at Cambridge University, John Rutter, was recruited. Carols for Choirs 2 was published in 1970.

The Carols For Choirs series have become standard choral texts throughout the English-speaking world and were highly influential; according to the composer John Rutter, they "changed the whole sound of Christmas for everybody who sings".

On 29 December 2021, it was announced that a new volume, Carols for Choirs 6, would be published in the summer of 2023. A poll was released to suggest the colour of the new book, the most popular colour being purple. The volume was released on 13 July 2023, featuring fifty carols (both originals and arrangements).

== Volumes ==
Choir singers sometimes refer to the books by the colours of their covers, with the "green" and "orange" books (volumes 1 and 2) being the most widely used. The "blue" book (volume 3) contains a number of longer anthems. A compendium volume called 100 100 Carols for Choirs (the "white" book) consisting of 74 of the most popular items from Carols for Choirs 1, 2 and 3, plus 26 pieces new to the series was published in 1987. It contains both accompanied and unaccompanied items, as well as the Order of Service for a Festival of Nine Lessons and Carols.

The "red" book (Volume 4) features fifty carols arranged for sopranos and altos. Oxford University Press extended the series with volumes appropriate for other church seasons, such as Lent/Easter. In July 2011, Oxford University Press published the fifth incarnation of the original series, Carols for Choirs 5, edited by composer Bob Chilcott, to celebrate the 50th anniversary of the publication of the first volume; it is presented in gold covers.

- Jacques, Reginald; Willcocks, David, eds. (24 August 1961). Carols for Choirs 1: Fifty Christmas Carols. OUP. ISBN 9780193532229.
- Willcocks, David; Rutter, John, eds. (16 July 1970). Carols for Choirs 2: Fifty Carols for Christmas and Advent. Oxford: OUP. ISBN 9780193535657.
- Willcocks, David; Rutter, John, eds. (7 September 1978). Carols for Choirs 3: Fifty Christmas Carols. Oxford: OUP. ISBN 9780193535701.
- Willcocks, David; Rutter, John, eds. (21 August 1980). Carols for Choirs 4: Fifty Carols for Sopranos and Altos. London: OUP. ISBN 9780193535732.
- Chilcott, Bob; Blackwell, David, eds. (2011). Carols for Choirs 5: Fifty Christmas Carols. Oxford: OUP. ISBN 9780193373563.
- Chilcott, Bob; Hill, David, eds. (2023). Carols for Choirs 6: Fifty Christmas Carols. Oxford: OUP. ISBN 9780193551114.
- Rutter, John; Willcocks, David, eds. (1987). 100 Carols for Choirs. Oxford: OUP. ISBN 9780193532274.

=== Other seasons ===
- Scott, John; Dakers, Lionel, eds. (1998). Ash Wednesday to Easter for Choirs. London: OUP. ISBN 9780193531116.
- Archer, Malcolm; Cleobury, Stephen, eds. (6 April 2000). Advent for Choirs. Oxford: OUP. ISBN 978-0-19-353025-6.
- Archer, Malcolm; Scott, John, eds. (2004). Epiphany to All Saints for Choirs: Anthems for the Church's Seasons. Oxford: OUP. ISBN 978-0-19-353026-3.

== Contents ==
| Volume/number | Title | Composer/Source | Arrangement | Seasonal use |
|---|---|---|---|---|
| 1. 1 | A Great and Mighty Wonder | Old German | Michael Praetorius (arr.) | Christmas |
| 1. 2 | Away in a Manger | William Kirkpatrick | David Willcocks (arr.) | Christmas |
| 1. 2b | Away in a Manger | Trad. Norman | Reginald Jacques (arr.) | Christmas |
| 1. 3 | A Boy was Born | Benjamin Britten | | Christmas |
| 1. 4 | As with Gladness Men of Old | Conrad Kocher | David Willcocks (arr.) | Christmas |
| 1. 5 | And there were Shepherds | Johann Sebastian Bach | David Willcocks (ed.) | Christmas |
| 1. 6 | A Virgin Most Pure | Trad. English | Charles Wood (arr.) | Christmas |
| 1. 7 | Angels, from the Realms of Glory | Old French | Reginald Jacques (arr.) | Christmas |
| 1.8 | A Christmas Carol | Trad. Hungarian | Zoltán Kodály (arr.) | Christmas |
| 1. 9 | Blessed be that Maid Mary | Trad English | David Willcocks (arr.) | Christmas |
| 1.10 | Ding Dong! Merrily on High | Traditional | Charles Wood (harm.) | Christmas |
| 1.11 | God Rest You Merry, Gentlemen | Trad. English | David Willcocks (arr.) | Christmas |
| 1.12 | Zither Carol | Trad. Czech | Malcolm Sargent (arr.) | Christmas |
| 1.13 | Good King Wenceslas | Piae Cantiones | Reginald Jacques (arr.) | Christmas |
| 1.14 | Hark! the Herald Angels Sing | Felix Mendelssohn | David Willcocks (arr.) | Christmas |
| 1.15 | In Dulci Jubilo | Robert Lucas Pearsall | Reginald Jacques (arr.) | Christmas |
| 1.16 | Infant Holy, Infant Lowly | Polish | David Willcocks (arr.) | Christmas |
| 1.17 | I Saw Three Ships | Trad. English | David Willcocks (arr.) | Christmas |
| 1.17 | I Saw Three Ships | Reginald Jacques | | Christmas |
| 1.18 | It Came Upon the Midnight Clear | Traditional | Arthur Sullivan (arr.) | Christmas |
| 1.19 | A Merry Christmas | Trad. English | Arthur Warrell (arr.) | Christmas |
| 1.20 | King Jesus Hath a Garden | Dutch | Charles Wood (harm.) | Christmas |
| 1.21 | Rocking | Czech | David Willcocks (arr.) | Christmas |
| 1.22 | Carol, with Lullaby | Phyllis Tate | | Christmas |
| 1.23 | Coventry Carol | Traditional | | Christmas |
| 1.23b | Coventry Carol | Traditional | Martin Shaw (arr.) | Christmas |
| 1.24 | No Sad Thought his Soul Affright | Ralph Vaughan Williams | | Christmas |
| 1.25 | O Little One Sweet | Old German | Johann Sebastian Bach (harm.) | Christmas |
| 1.26 | Adeste Fideles | Traditional | David Willcocks (arr.) | Christmas |
| 1.26b | O Come, All Ye Faithful | Traditional | David Willcocks (arr.) | Christmas |
| 1.27 | O Little Town of Bethlehem | Ralph Vaughan Williams | Thomas Armstrong (ed.) | Christmas |
| 1.28 | O men from the fields | Arnold Cooke | | Christmas |
| 1.29 | Sussex Carol | Traditional | David Willcocks (arr.) | Christmas |
| 1.30 | Once in Royal David's City | Henry J. Gauntlett | Arthur Henry Mann (harm.) | Christmas |
| 1.31 | Past three a clock | Traditional | Charles Wood (arr.) | Christmas |
| 1.32 | Rejoice and be merry | Trad. English | Reginald Jacques (arr.) | Christmas |
| 1.33 | See amid the winter's snow | John Goss | David Willcocks (arr.) | Christmas |
| 1.34 | Lute-book lullaby | William Ballet | Geoffrey Shaw (arr.) | Christmas |
| 1.35 | The linden tree carol | Old German | Reginald Jacques (arr.) | Annunciation / Christmas / Epiphany |
| 1.36 | The Blessed son of God | Ralph Vaughan Williams | | Christmas |
| 1.37 | The Boar's head carol | Trad English | Elizabeth Poston (arr.) | Christmas |
| 1.38 | The first Nowell | Trad. English | David Willcocks (arr.) | Christmas / Epiphany |
| 1.39 | The Holly and the Ivy | Trad. English | Reginald Jacques (arr.) | Lent / Christmas / Epiphany |
| 1.40 | The Three Kings | Peter Cornelius | Ivor Atkins (arr.) | Epiphany |
| 1.41 | The Shepherd's farewell | Hector Berlioz | | Christmas |
| 1.42 | Torches | John Joubert | | Christmas |
| 1.43 | Unto us is born a son | Piae Cantiones | David Willcocks | Christmas |
| 1.44 | Up! good Christen folk, and listen | Piae Cantiones | George Ratcliffe Woodward (arr.) | Christmas |
| 1.45 | We've been a while a-wandering | Trad. Yorkshire | Ralph Vaughan Williams (arr.) | Christmas |
| 1.46 | Gloucestershire Wassail | Traditional | Ralph Vaughan Williams (arr.) | Christmas |
| 1.47 | What cheer? | William Walton | | Christmas |
| 1.48 | When Christ was born | Reginald Jacques | | Christmas |
| 1.49 | While Shepherds Watched their Flocks by Night | Traditional | Thomas Ravenscroft (ed.) | Christmas |
| 1.50 | While the shepherds were watching | Cecil Armstrong Gibbs | | Christmas |
| 2. 1 | A babe is born I wys | Frederick Bainton | | Christmas |
| 2. 2 | A child is born in Bethlehem | Samuel Scheidt | David Willcocks (ed.) | Christmas |
| 2. 3 | Adam lay ybounden | Boris Ord | | Christmas |
| 2. 4 | All my heart this night rejoices | Johann Georg Ebeling | | Christmas |
| 2. 5 | All this time | William Walton | | Christmas |
| 2. 6 | Nativity carol | John Rutter | | Christmas |
| 2. 7 | Deck the Hall | Traditional (Welsh) | David Willcocks (arr.) | Christmas |
| 2. 8 | Ding Dong! Merrily on high | Traditional (French) | David Willcocks (arr.) | Christmas |
| 2. 9 | Down in yon forest | Traditional (English) | John Rutter (arr.) | Christmas |
| 2.10 | Shepherd's pipe carol | John Rutter | | Christmas |
| 2.11 | Hail! Blessed Virgin Mary | Traditional (Italian) | Charles Wood (arr.) | Christmas |
| 2.12 | Here we come a-wassailing | Traditional (English) | John Rutter (arr.) | Christmas |
| 2.13 | A new year carol | Benjamin Britten | | Christmas |
| 2.14 | How far is it to Bethlehem? | Traditional (English) | David Willcocks (arr.) | Christmas |
| 2.15 | Matin responsory | Adapted from a Magnificat by Palestrina | | Advent |
| 2.16 | Come, Thou Redeemer of the Earth | Traditional (German) | David Willcocks (arr.) | Advent / Christmas |
| 2.17 | Il est né le divin enfant | Traditional (French) | John Rutter (arr.) | Christmas |
| 2.18 | I saw a maiden | Anonymous (Basque Noel) | Edgar Pettman (arr.) | Christmas |
| 2.19 | Myn lyking | Richard R. Terry | | Christmas |
| 2.20 | I sing of a maiden | Patrick Hadley | | Christmas |
| 2.21 | It Came Upon the Midnight Clear | Arthur Sullivan | David Willcocks (desc.) | Christmas |
| 2.22 | The Cherry-Tree Carol | Traditional (English) | David Willcocks (arr.) | Christmas |
| 2.23 | Masters in this Hall | Traditional (French) | David Willcocks (arr.) | Christmas |
| 2.24 | Noël Nouvelet | Traditional (French) | John Rutter (arr.) | Christmas |
| 2.25 | Sans Day Carol | Traditional (Cornish) | John Rutter (arr.) | Christmas |
| 2.26 | Sir Christèmas | William Mathias | | Christmas |
| 2.27 | O Come, O Come Emmanuel | Traditional (15th century French Processional) | David Willcocks (arr.) | Christmas |
| 2.28 | The Shepherds' Cradle Song | Karl Leuner | Charles Macpherson (arr.) | Christmas |
| 2.29 | Of the Father's Heart Begotten | From Piae Cantiones | David Willcocks (arr.) | Christmas |
| 2.30 | The Twelve Days of Christmas | Traditional (English) | John Rutter (arr.) | Christmas |
| 2.31 | Once in Royal David's city | Henry Gauntlett, A. H. Mann | David Willcocks (arr.) | Christmas |
| 2.31 | Out of your Sleep | Richard Rodney Bennett | | Christmas |
| 2.33 | Past Three a Clock | Traditional (English) | John Rutter (arr.) | Christmas |
| 2.34 | Personent Hodie | German, 1360 | Gustav Holst (arr.) | Christmas |
| 2.35 | Quelle est cette odeur agréable | Traditional (French) | David Willcocks (arr.) | Christmas |
| 2.36 | Quem pastores laudavere | Traditional (14th century German) | John Rutter (arr.) | Christmas |
| 2.37 | Quittez, Pasteurs | Traditional (French) | John Rutter (arr.) | Christmas |
| 2.38 | Resonemus Laudibus | Traditional (14th century) | David Willcocks (arr.) | Christmas |
| 2.39 | The angels and the shepherds | Traditional (Bohemian) | C. H. Trevor (arr.) | Christmas |
| 2.40 | Stille Nacht | Franz Xaver Gruber | David Willcocks (arr.) | Christmas |
| 2.41 | The Infant King | Basque Noel | David Willcocks (arr.) | Christmas |
| 2.42 | There is no Rose | 15th century English | John Stevens (ed.) | Christmas |
| 2.43 | Gabriel's message | Basque Noel | David Willcocks (arr.) | Christmas |
| 2.44 | The Holly and the Ivy | English traditional | Walford Davies (arr.) | Christmas |
| 2.45 | The Lord at first did Adam make | English traditional | David Willcocks (arr.) | Christmas |
| 2.46 | The Truth from Above | English traditional | Ralph Vaughan Williams (arr.) | Christmas |
| 2.47 | Tomorrow shall be my Dancing Day | English traditional | David Willcocks (arr.) | Christmas |
| 2.48 | While shepherds Watched their Flocks | from Este's Psalter | David Willcocks (arr.) | Christmas |
| 2.49 | Patapan | Burgundian | Reginald Jacques (arr.) | Christmas |
| 2.50 | Zion hears the Watchmen's Voices | Johann Sebastian Bach | John Rutter (ed.) | Christmas |
| 2.Apx1 | Hark! The herald angels sing | Adapted from Felix Mendelssohn by W. H. Cummings | | Christmas |
| 2.Apx2 | O come, all ye faithful | John Francis Wade | | Christmas |
| 2.ps | An Advent Carol Service (order of service) | | | Advent |
| 3. 1 | A babe is Born | William Mathias | | Christmas Day |
| 3. 2 | A babe is Born in Bethlehem | German Traditional, arr. Johann Hermann Schein | | Christmas |
| 3. 3 | A Child this Day is Born | English Traditional, arr. David Willcocks | | Christmas |
| 3.28 | All in the Morning | English Traditional, arr. Ralph Vaughan Williams | | Christmas |
| 3.25 | Angel Tidings | Moravian Traditional, John Rutter | | Christmas |
| 3. 6 | Angelus ad Virginem | 14th century English, arr. David Willcocks | | Advent / Christmas |
| 3. 9 | Bethlehem, of Noblest Cities | 18th century German, arr. David Willcocks | | Epiphany |
| 3.36 | Birthday Carol | David Willcocks | | Christmas |
| 3.43 | Boar's Head Carol | English Traditional, arr. David Willcocks | | Christmas |
| 3.10 | Child in a Manger | Celtic Traditional, arr. John Rutter | | Christmas |
| 3.11 | Christ was Born on Christmas Day | German Traditional, arr. David Willcocks | | Christmas |
| 3.12 | Christe, Redemptor Omnium | Claudio Monteverdi | | Christmas |
| 3. 5 | Christmas Oratorio (3 extracts) | Johann Sebastian Bach | | Christmas |
| 3.13 | Come all you Worthy Gentlemen | English Traditional, arr. David Willcocks | | Christmas |
| 3.14 | Come, Rock the Cradle for Him | Psalteriolum Harmonicum, 1642 | | Christmas |
| 3.26 | Cradle Song | Flemish Traditional, arr. John Rutter | | Christmas |
| 3.50 | The Crown of Roses | Pyotr Ilyich Tchaikovsky | | Christmas |
| 3.15 | Deck the Hall | Welsh Traditional, arr. David Willcocks | | Christmas |
| 3.16 | Donkey Carol | John Rutter | | Christmas |
| 3. 7 | Flemish Carol | Flemish Traditional, arr. John Rutter | | Christmas |
| 3.42 | Gabriel's Message | Basque Traditional, arr. David Willcocks | | Advent/ Christmas |
| 3.17 | Hark! the Herald Angels Sing | Felix Mendelssohn, adapt. W. H. Cummings | | Christmas |
| 3.20 | He Smiles within his Cradle | Austrian Traditional, arr. David Willcocks | | Christmas |
| 3.21 | Hush! my Dear, Lie Still and Slumber | French Traditional, arr. David Willcocks | | Christmas |
| 3.23 | I Saw Three Ships | English Traditional, arr. John Rutter | | Christmas |
| 3.24 | Il est né le divin enfant | French Traditional, arr. David Willcocks | | Christmas |
| 3.27 | In Dulci Jubilo | German Traditional, arr. John Rutter | | Christmas |
| 3.22 | In the Bleak Mid-Winter | Gustav Holst | | Christmas |
| 3.19 | Jesus Child | John Rutter | | Christmas |
| 3.46 | King Herod and the Cock | William Walton | | Holy Innocents |
| 3.29 | King Jesus Hath a Garden | John Rutter | | Christmas |
| 3.48 | Kings of Orient | John Henry Hopkins, Jr., arr. David Willcocks | | Epiphany |
| 3.30 | Lo! He Comes with Clouds Descending | English Traditional, arr. David Willcocks | | Advent |
| 3.31 | O Come, All Ye Faithful | J. F. Wade | | Christmas |
| 3.32 | O Little Town of Bethlehem | Walford Davies | | Christmas |
| 3.33 | Omnis mundus jocundetur | Michael Praetorius | | Christmas |
| 3.35 | Once, as I Remember | Italian Traditional, arr. Charles Wood | | Christmas |
| 3.34 | Psallite Unigenito | Michael Praetorius | | |
| 3.37 | Salve Puerule | Marc-Antoine Charpentier | | |
| 3.39 | Shepherds, in the Field Abiding | French Traditional, arr. David Willcocks | | Christmas |
| 3.40 | Sing we to this Merry Company | 15th century English, ed. John Stevens | | Christmas |
| 3.38 | Star Carol | John Rutter | | Christmas |
| 3.41 | Stille Nacht | Franz Xaver Gruber, arr. Donald Cashmore | | Christmas |
| 3. 8 | Sunny Bank | Peter Hurford | | |
| 3. 4 | Susanni | Richard Rodney Bennett | | Christmas |
| 3.45 | There is no Rose | Benjamin Britten | | Christmas |
| 3.App.1 | This joyful Eastertide | Dutch Traditional, arr. Charles Wood | | Easter |
| 3.44 | Tryste Noel | Herbert Howells | | Christmas |
| 3.18 | Wexford Carol | Irish Traditional, arr. John Rutter | | Christmas |
| 3.47 | What Child is This? | English Traditional, arr. David Willcocks | | Christmas |
| 3.49 | What Sweeter Music | Richard Rodney Bennett | | Christmas |
| 4. 1 | Adeste Fideles | | Willcocks | |
| 4. 2 | Angels, from the Realms of Glory | | Willcocks | |
| 4. 5 | Away in a Manger | Kirkpatrick | Willcocks | |
| 4. 6 | The Cherry Tree Carol | | Willcocks | |
| 4. 7 | Coventry Carol | | Rutter | |
| 4. 8 | Deck the Hall | | Rutter | |
| 4. 9 | Ding Dong! Merrily on High | | Willcocks | |
| 4.10 | Donkey Carol | | Rutter | |
| 4.11 | The First Nowell | | Willcocks | |
| 4.13 | Gabriel's Message | | Rutter | |
| 4.14 | God Rest you Merry, Gentlemen (2 versions) | | Willcocks | |
| 4.15 | Good King Wenceslas | Piae Cantiones | arr. Willcocks | |
| 4.16 | Hail! Blessed Virgin Mary | | Wood | |
| 4.17 | Hark! the Herald Angels Sing (2 verses) | Mendelssohn | desc. Willcocks | |
| 4.18 | He Smiles within His Cradle | | Willcocks | |
| 4.19 | The Holly and the Ivy | | Rutter | |
| 4.20 | How Far is it to Bethlehem? | | Willcocks | |
| 4.21 | I Saw Three Ships | | Willcocks | Christmas |
| 4.22 | I Sing of a Maiden | Hadley | | |
| 4.23 | Il est né le divin enfant | | Rutter | |
| 4.24 | In Dulci Jubilo (4-part version) | | Pearsall | |
| 4.25 | In Dulci Jubilo (3-part version) Rutter | | Pearsall | |
| 4.26 | The Infant King | | Rutter | |
| 4.27 | It Came Upon the Midnight Clear | Sullivan | Willcocks | |
| 4.28 | King Jesus hath a Garden | | Rutter | |
| 4.30 | Lute-book Lullaby | Ballet | Rutter | |
| 4.31 | A Merry Christmas | | Rutter | |
| 4.32 | Nativity Carol | Rutter | | |
| 4.33 | A New Year Carol | Britten | | |
| 4.34 | O Come, all ye Faithful | | Willcocks | |
| 4.36 | O Little Town of Bethlehem | | Willcocks | |
| 4.37 | Once in Royal David's City (2 versions) | Gauntlett | Willcocks | |
| 4.38 | Past Three a Clock | | Rutter | |
| 4.39 | Personent Hodie | | Rutter | |
| 4.40 | Quelle est cette odeur agréable | | Willcocks | |
| 4.41 | 'Quem Pastores Laudavere' | | Rutter | |
| 4.42 | Rocking | | Willcocks | |
| 4.43 | See Amid the Winter's Snow | Goss | ed. Willcocks | |
| 4.44 | Shepherd's Pipe Carol | Rutter | | |
| 4.45 | Star Carol | Pont | Rutter | |
| 4.46 | Stille Nacht | Gruber | Rutter | |
| 4.47 | Sussex Carol | | Willcocks | |
| 4.48 | There is no Rose | | Britten | |
| 4.49 | Tomorrow Shall be my Dancing Day | | Rutter | |
| 4.50 | Unto us is Born a Son | Piae Cantiones | arr. Willcocks | |
| 4.51 | Up! Good Christen folk, and Listen | Piae Cantiones | ed. Woodward | |
| 4.52 | A Virgin Most Pure | | Rutter | |
| 4.53 | While Shepherds Watched | | Willcocks | |

== See also ==
- Christmas music
- List of Christmas carols
- Nine Lessons and Carols (Carols from King's College, Cambridge)
- Oxford Book of Carols
