= Ding Dong Merrily on High =

Christmas carol

Song
- Language: English, Latin
- Published: 1924
- Genre: Christmas carol
- Songwriter: George Ratcliffe Woodward

"Ding Dong Merrily on High" is a Christmas carol. The tune first appeared as a secular dance tune known under the title "Branle de l'Official" in Orchésographie, a dance book written by the French cleric, composer and writer Thoinot Arbeau, pen name of Jehan Tabourot (1519–1593). The words are by the English composer George Ratcliffe Woodward (1848–1934), and the carol was first published in 1924 in his The Cambridge Carol-Book: Being Fifty-two Songs for Christmas, Easter, And Other Seasons. Woodward took an interest in church bell ringing. Woodward was the author of several carol books, including Songs of Syon and The Cowley Carol Book. The macaronic style is characteristic of Woodward's delight in archaic poetry. Charles Wood harmonised the tune when it was published with Woodward's text in The Cambridge Carol Book. More recently, Sir David Willcocks made an arrangement for the second book of Carols for Choirs.

== Text and melody ==
Ding Dong! merrily on high
In heav'n the bells are ringing
Ding, dong! verily the sky
Is riv'n with angel singing
Gloria, Hosanna in excelsis

E'en so here below, below
Let steeple bells be swungen
And i-o, i-o, i-o
By priest and people be sungen
Gloria, Hosanna in excelsis

Pray ye dutifully prime
Your matin chime, ye ringers
May ye beautifully rime
Your evetime song, ye singers
Gloria, Hosanna in excelsis.

== Recordings ==
- Roger Whittaker album Tidings of Comfort and Joy (1984)
- Maddy Prior album A Tapestry of Carols (1987)
- The Chieftains album The Bells of Dublin (1991)
- The Wiggles album Wiggly, Wiggly Christmas (1996)
- Cantiga album Magic Steps (1998)
- Celtic Woman album A Christmas Celebration (1998)
- Charlotte Church album Dream a Dream (2000)
- Cherish the Ladies album On Christmas Night (2004)
- Blackmore's Night album Winter Carols (2006)
- Chris Squire album Chris Squire's Swiss Choir (2007)
- Linda Brava album Angels (2010)
- O Holy Night (2012) by Millennial Choirs and Orchestras
- Choir of King's College, Cambridge album 100 Years of Nine Lessons and Carols (2018)

== See also ==
- "Angels We Have Heard on High" which has a similar Gloria refrain
- List of Christmas carols
