= This joyful Eastertide =

Easter carol

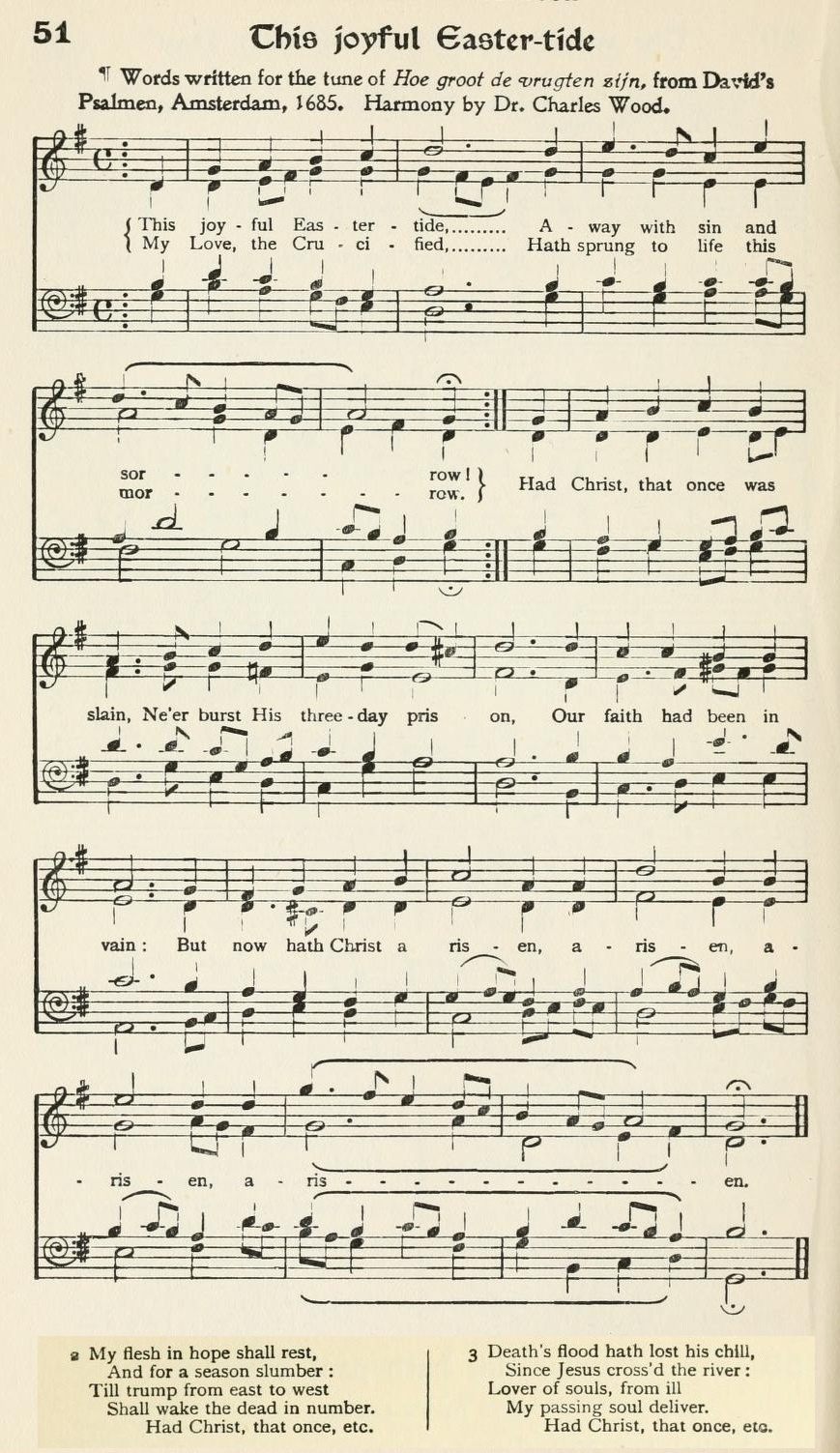
- The hymn in Woodward's 1922 edition
- Genre: Hymn
- Written: 1894
- Text: George Ratcliffe Woodward and Charles Wood
- Meter: 6.7.6.7 with refrain
- Melody: "Vruechten"

"This joyful Eastertide" is an 1894 Easter carol. The words are by George Ratcliffe Woodward, the tune is from the Netherlands (1624), and the 1894 harmonisation is by Charles Wood.

== Publication ==
The original carol was published in 1894 in Carols for Easter and Ascensiontide, a publication put together by Woodward and Wood. They published it subsequently in 1902 in The Cowley Carol Book (second edition) and again in the Cambridge Carol Book of 1910.

The music has been republished many times, often under choral arrangements. It appears in the Carols for Choirs collection under Wood's original arrangement. Some of the arrangements published include that of William Llewellyn published by Oxford University Press, and that of Philip Ledger. More recently, Oxford University Press published the text set to a completely new tune composed by Matthew Owens in 2015 in the form of a choral anthem.

A number of alternative versions exist, including Percy Dearmer's "How great the Harvest is"; "This Joyful Eastertide, What need is there for grieving?" and "How rich, at Eastertide", both by Fred Pratt Green; and in German, "Der schöne Ostertag" (Jurgen Henkys, 1983) and "Die frohe Osterzeit" (Friedrich Hoffmann, 1986).

== Tune ==
Vruechten ("Hoe groot de vruchten zijn")
The tune commonly used to sing "This joyful Eastertide" (arranged for brass instruments and played by the St. James Brass Ensemble)

Woodward and Wood published "This joyful Eastertide" set to Vruechten, a Dutch tune published in 1624 in Dirk Rafaelsz Camphuysen's collection of 'Stichtelycke Rymen' where it was attached to the hymn "De liefde Voortgebracht", a scripture paraphrase of 1 Corinthians 13. It also appears as a hymn tune in Joachim Oudaen's 1685 psalter, "David's Psalmen" as a setting for "Hoe groot de vruchten zijn", a paraphrase of 1 Corinthians 15:12-23. In both instances the ascending repeats of the final line of the refrain effectively support the respective central messages of the paraphrased Bible verses. Joseph Butler, an Amsterdam municipal musician of English origin, published a number of variations for the keyboard based on the same tune.

== Text ==
Many versions exist of the three original verses; but in its original form as written by George Ratcliffe Woodward and published in 1894, it is as follows:

1. This joyful Eastertide, away with sin and sorrow.
My Love, the Crucified, hath sprung to life this morrow. (To refrain)

Refrain:
Had Christ, that once was slain, ne'er burst his three-day prison,
Our faith had been in vain: but now hath Christ arisen.

2. My flesh in hope shall rest, and for a season slumber:
Till trump from east to west shall wake the dead in number. (To refrain)

3. Death's flood hath lost his chill, since Jesus crossed the river:
Lover of souls, from ill my passing soul deliver. (To refrain)

Two additional verses were penned by Basilian Father M. Owen Lee:

4. As Victor in the strife and knowing no surrender,
He comes to bring us life: a risen life of splendour. (To refrain)

5. In Adam all men died; then Jesus came to save us.
For He was crucified and, dying, new life gave us. (To refrain)
