= Christmas Night =

Studio album by Cambridge Singers
- Released: 1987, 2020
- Genre: Choral
- Length: 63:06
- Label: Collegium Records
- Producer: Jillian White

Christmas Night (subtitled Carols of the Nativity) is a Christmas-themed album by The Cambridge Singers conducted by John Rutter. Most songs are sung a cappella, on others the choir is accompanied by The City of London Sinfonia. It was first released in 1987 on Rutter’s label Collegium Records, and remastered and re-released (with a new cover artwork) by John Rutter in 2020.

== The album ==
The CD version of Christmas Night contains 22 Christmas carols spanning more than six centuries. Most of these have become well known thanks to the Christmas Eve Festival of Nine Lessons and Carols at King's College in Cambridge. Some arrangements for the carols on the album were written by conductors or arrangers who have worked at King's College over the years.

Most carols on the album were written centuries ago, although several are relatively young. For instance, "Candlelight Carol" was written in 1984 by Rutter. Others are a mix of old and new: "There is a Flower" was written by fifteenth century monk John Audely, with new music by Rutter.

== Critical response ==
Professional ratings
Review scores
Source	Rating
Allmusic	4/5 stars

Rick Anderson of Allmusic calls the album "a surprisingly varied program of songs from British, Italian, American, German, and Basque sources". He says that the pieces penned by the composer, John Rutter, are "ripe and fulsome and gushing in that idiosyncratically British neo-romantic way". Compared to other Christmas albums released by the Cambridge Singers he says this album is "more or less interchangeable" but they all are "...pure, unadulterated, tear-in-the-eye Christmas Eve devotional spirit...".

== Track listing ==
Track listing, with the original composer (if known) between brackets.

1. "In Dulci Jubilo" (German traditional)
2. "Adam Lay Ybounden" (Boris Ord)
3. "Christmas Night" (French trad.)
4. "Once, as I Remember" (Italian trad.)
5. "A Spotless Rose" (Herbert Howells)
6. "In the Bleak Midwinter" (Harold Darke)
7. "There is a Flower" (John Rutter)
8. "The Cherry Tree Carol" (English trad.)
9. "I Wonder As I Wander" (Appalachian carol)
10. "Candlelight Carol" (John Rutter)
11. "O Tannenbaum" (German trad.)
12. "Tomorrow Shall Be My Dancing Day" (English trad.)
13. "A Virgin Most Pure" (English trad.)
14. "I Sing of a Maiden" (Patrick Hadley)
15. "Lute-Book Lullaby" (William Ballet)
16. "The Three Kings" (Peter Cornelius)
17. "Myn Lyking" (R.R. Terry)
18. "O Little One Sweet" (Samuel Scheidt)
19. "All My Heart This Night Rejoices" (G. Ebeling)
20. "I Saw a Maiden" (Basque trad.)
21. "Away In A Manger" (W.J. Kirkpatrick)
22. "Nativity Carol" (John Rutter)

== Personnel ==
- John Rutter - conductor, arranger, composer
- Cambridge Singers - performers
- City of London Sinfonia - orchestra
- Jillian White - record producer
- Campbell Hughes - engineer
- David Jacob - digital editing
- Nick Findell - cover design
