= William Dafydd =

Welsh poet

William Dafydd (floruit c. 1597) was a 16th and perhaps 17th century Welsh poet. Little is known about him, one religious carol may be his only surviving work.
