= Green Groweth the Holly =

16th century English poem and carol by Henry VIII

- by King Henry VIII of England
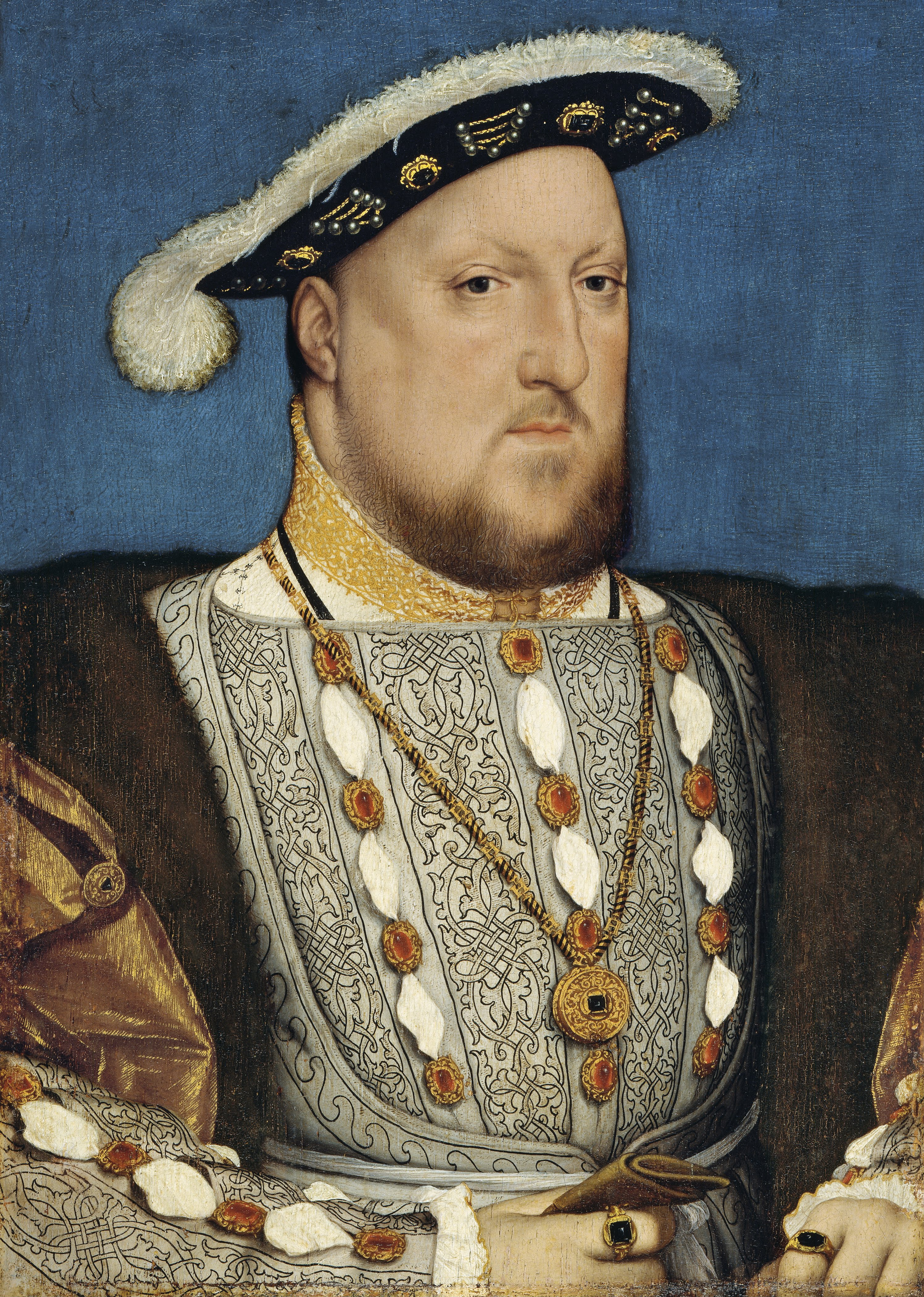
- Henry VIII
- Genre: Christmas carol
- Language: English
- Published: 1522
- "Grene growith the holy"

"Green Groweth the Holly", also titled "Green Grow'th the Holly", is a 16th-century English poem and carol written by King Henry VIII of England. The carol was written as "a carol for three voices".

== Carol ==
During Medieval times, carols had started to develop a separate style from ordinary Christian hymns, though not necessarily performed just at Christmas. King Henry VIII was a Renaissance monarch who was educated in music and several languages. The King wrote "Green Groweth the Holly" as his own take on the developing Christmas carol style. It is not known exactly when King Henry wrote the carol but it is known to have been published in 1522. In addition to writing the words, the King also composed the music.

The King's song, which is in fact a love song and not a Christmas song, survives in a manuscript now in the British Library (Add MS 31922) copied in about 1511–1513, probably not for the King himself, when Henry was in his early twenties (he became king in 1509). Despite the initial popularity during King Henry's reign, when it had been described as "this little piece by Henry VIII that is one of the half dozen that mark him as the first lyricist of his age", the carol afterwards fell into disfavour and the British Library described it as a "failed classic". The King may have written it as an adaption of the English folk carol "The Holly and the Ivy", but it has been argued that "Green Groweth the Holly" preceded that more famous carol.

== Poem ==
"Green Groweth the Holly" has also been circulated as a love poem. The original poem has no references to God or Christmas in it. The evergreen character of the holly during the winter's weather is instead offered as an image for the faithfulness of the male lover to his beloved through all adversities.

== Lyrics ==
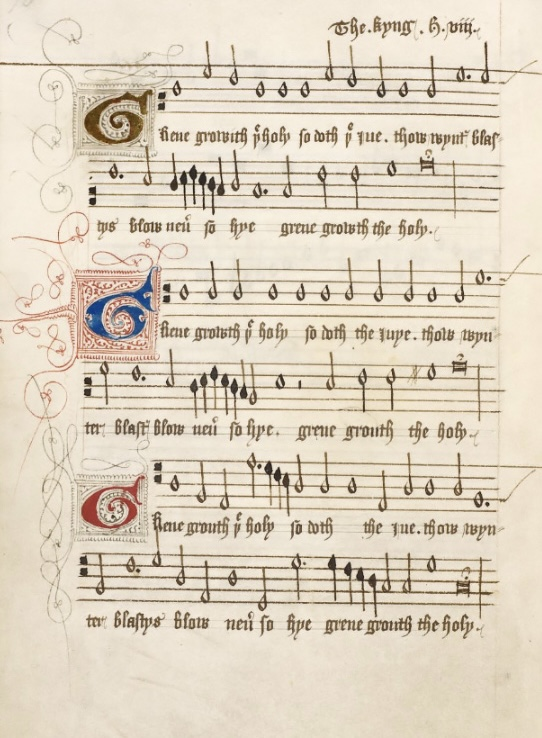
A contemporary copy of the carol

The full lyrics, written in MS 31922 in naturally archaic English, (Note: Archaic contractions and letters are replaced here with modern representations.) are as follows:

Grene growith the holy
so doth the Iue. (Note: "ivy")
thow wyntes blastys (Note: "winter blasts") blow neuer so hye,
grene growth the holy.

As the holy grouth grene
and neuer chaungyth hew.
So I am euer hath bene
vnto my lady trew.

A the holy grouth grene:
with Iue all alone.
When flowerys can not be sene:
and grene wode leuys (Note: "greenwood leaves") be gone.

Now vn to my lady
promyse to her I make.
Ffrome all other only
to her. I me be take.

Adew myne owne lady.
Adew my specyall.
Who hath my hart trewly
be suere and euer shall.
