= Deep in the Darkness a Starlight is Gleaming =

British Christian Epiphany hymn

"Deep in the Darkness a Starlight is Gleaming" is a British Christian Epiphany hymn by Jan Berry. The hymn was written to reference to the Massacre of the Holy Innocents following the visit of the Biblical Magi to the baby Jesus.

== History ==
"Deep in the darkness a starlight is gleaming" was written by Jan Berry, a Baptist and United Reformed Church minister. The hymn came about after a United Reformed Church minister approached her and stated that they could not find an appropriate hymn for Epiphany that covered the massacre of the Holy Innocents by King Herod at the end of the Epiphany timeline. This was because not many hymns cover the topic, except for Coventry Carol, and a verse in "Unto Us Is Born a Son". Berry copyrighted the hymn in 2011 when it was published in the Methodist Church of Great Britain's Singing the Faith hymnal. It was originally set to the "Epiphany Hymn" tune, the same one used in the fellow Epiphany hymn "Brightest and Best of the Sons of the Morning". However an original hymn tune called "High Point" was created for it by Paul Leddington Wright.

== Verse ==
The hymn uses imagery of a long journey that a Christian has to take through life. The second verse references Matthew 2:13-18 where Mary, Joseph and Jesus leave Bethlehem to flee to Egypt and Herod orders the slaughter of the Holy Innocents after realising the Magi have not returned to him. Though the hymn does not explicitly mention the Magi, it refers to them generally. The verses conclude, saying though a Christian can go through dark times, there will always be the brightness of God at the end.

== Usage ==
The hymn has also been used to commemorate final services in closing churches.
