= Edgar Pettman =

English organist, choral conductor and music editor

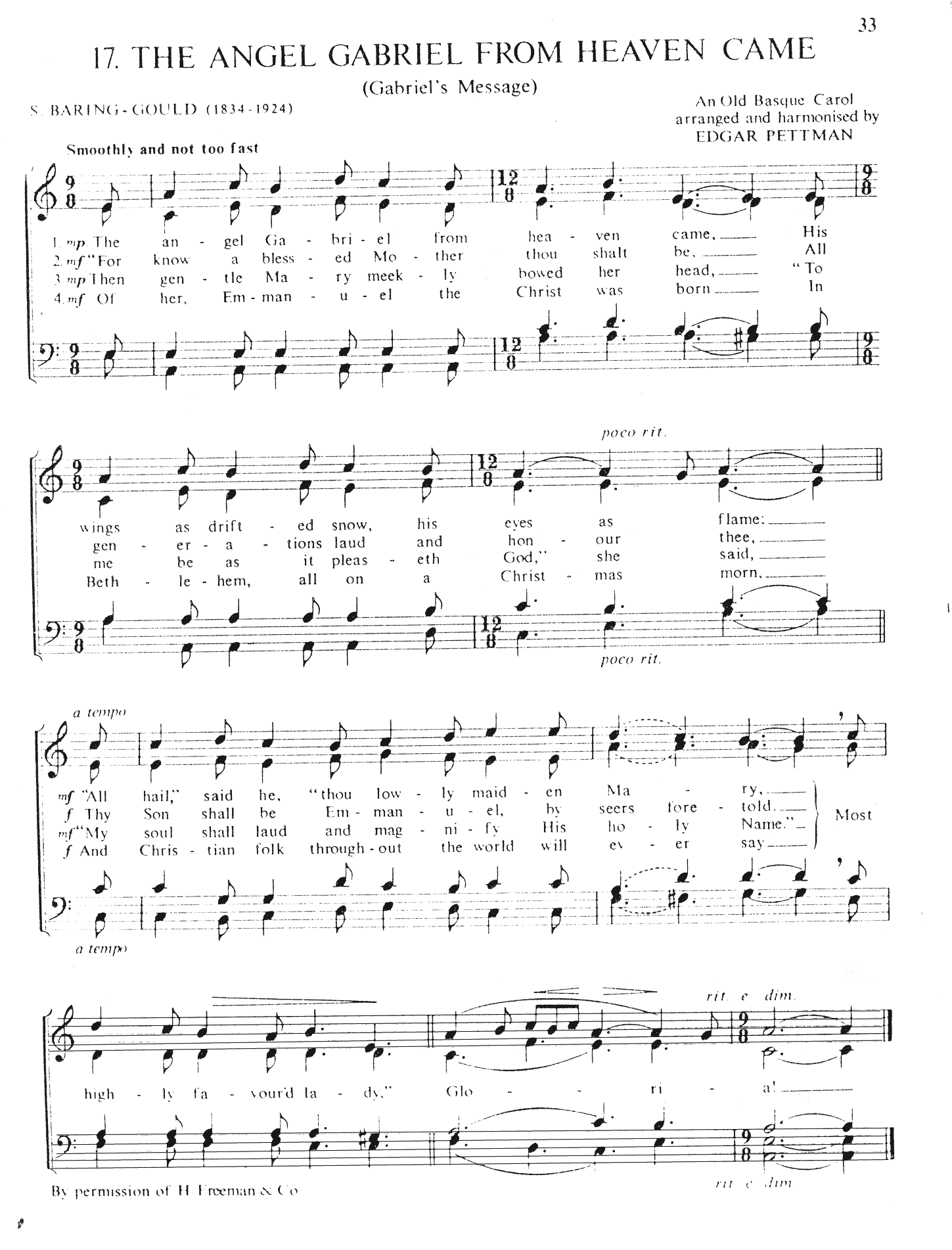
Pettman's arrangement of Gabriel's Message

Edgar Pettman (1866–1943) was an English organist, choral conductor and music editor.

Born at Dunkirk, Kent in 1881, Pettman entered the Royal Academy of Music where he studied under Sir George Macfarren. He was organist at a number of London churches, including St Mary's, Kilburn (1888), St James's Church, Piccadilly (!897-1902) and St Sepulchre's, Holborn (1902-1915) until his retirement in 1924.

Composer of a number of anthems and other church music, he is best known for his 1892 book Modern Christmas Carols. Pettman harmonized the now popular carols I Saw a Maiden and Gabriel's Message, both based on Basque carol melodies, publishing the latter in a pamphlet, The University Carol Book in 1922, with an English rendering by Sabine Baring-Gould. He was also an early editor of the works of Thomas Tallis, publishing an edition in 1900.
