= Quempas =

Christmas carol

- Christmas carol
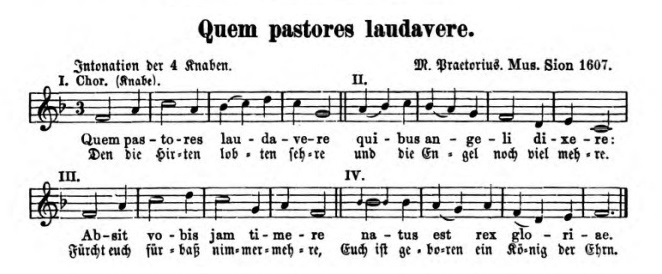
- English: "He whom the shepherds praised"
- Full title: "Quem pastores laudavere"
- Genre: Christmas carol
- Language: Latin

"Quempas" is the shortened title of the Latin Christmas carol "Quem pastores laudavere" ("He whom the shepherds praised"), popular in Germany in the sixteenth century, and used as a generic term for Christmas songs in a German caroling tradition. Quempas is also the name of a collection of old carols published by Bärenreiter since 1930.

== History ==
The earliest sources of the carol are from the fifteenth century, including the Hohenfurter Liederbuch from the Hohenfurth Monastery. Many versions exist from the sixteenth century. The most famous version is from Michael Praetorius, Musae Sioniae (1607), with the German text "Den die Hirten lobeten sehre."

== Text and melody ==
Quem pastores laudavere,
quibus angeli dixere,
absit vobis iam timere,
natus est rex gloriæ.

Ad quem reges ambulabant,
Aurum, Thus, Myrrham portabant,
immolabant haec sincere,
leoni victoriae.

Christo regi Deo nato
Per Mariam nobis dato
merito resonat vere
dulci cum melodia.

Shepherds left their flocks a-straying,
God's command with joy obeying,
When they heard the angel saying:
"Christ is born in Bethlehem."

Wise Men came from far, and saw him
Knelt in homage to adore him;
Precious gifts they laid before him:
Gold and frankincense and myrrh.

Let us now in every nation
Sing his praise with exultation.
All the world shall find salvation
In the birth of Mary's Son.

Students of the Latin school maintained a tradition of "Quempas singen," earning alms by going from house to house, singing carols.

In order to revive the Quempas singing tradition and fight the sentimentality of 19th-century Christmas carols, Wilhelm Thomas and Konrad Ameln published a collection of old carols under the title Quempas, sometimes called Quempas-Heft, printed by Bärenreiter. The first collection contained 39 songs with melodies. It was followed by choral editions, and a greater selection including 20th-century carols in 1962. Der neue Quempas, a collection of 41 songs, was published in 2012.

The carol is included in volume 2 of the British collection Carols for Choirs (1970), in an arrangement by John Rutter, in Latin with an English translation by Imogen Holst.

== See also ==
- List of Christmas carols
