= The Westminster Hymnal =

1912 book

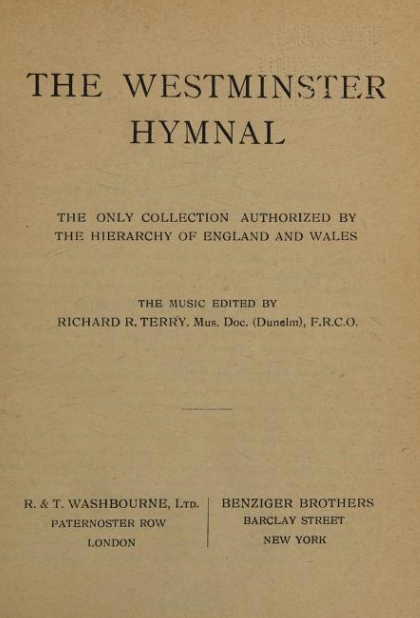
- Title page for The Westminster Hymnal (1912)
- Editor: Sir Richard Runciman Terry
- Subject: Hymns
- Publisher: R & T Washbourne, Ltd.
- Publication date: 1912
- Media type: Print
- OCLC: 906099262
- Dewey Decimal: 262.025, 782.27
- LC Class: M2119

The Westminster Hymnal was published in 1912, the only collection of hymns then authorised by the hierarchy of the Catholic Church of England and Wales. It was edited by Sir Richard Runciman Terry.

The notable feature of this hymnbook is the attempt to restore the authentic tunes to hymns that had changed over time and varied with location.

The hymnbook states that the music proper to the Catholic Church is Gregorian Chant, so there is a selection of about a dozen Latin hymns at the end of the book, along with organ accompaniments.

There are 250 vernacular hymns, not including alternate tunes. Many are translations from hymns of the Divine Office.

== See also ==
- List of English-language hymnals by denomination
