= Lullay, mine liking =

Middle English lyric poem or carol

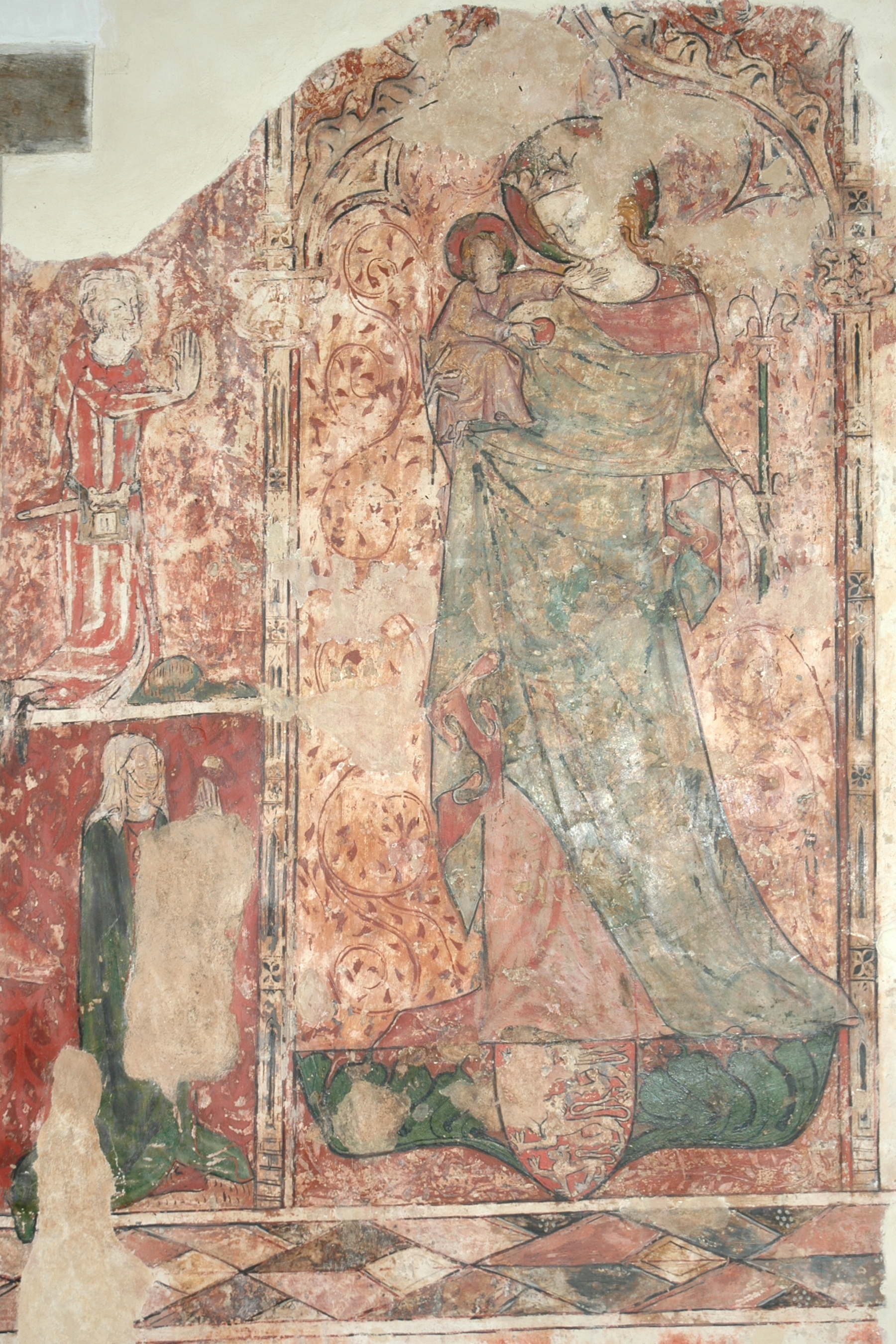
Madonna and Child in a 14th century wall painting, Oxfordshire.

"Lullay, mine liking" is a Middle English lyric poem or carol of the 15th century which frames a narrative describing an encounter of the Nativity with a song sung by the Virgin Mary to the infant Christ. The refrain is an early example of an English lullaby; the term "lullaby" is thought to originate with the "lu lu" or "la la" sound made by mothers or nurses to calm children, and "by" or "bye bye", another lulling sound (for example in the similarly ancient Coventry Carol).

There are a number of surviving medieval English verses associated with the birth of Jesus which take the form of a lullaby, of which this is probably the most famous example. Written by an anonymous hand, the text is found uniquely in Sloane MS 2593, a collection of medieval lyrics now held in the British Library.

Originally intended to be sung, no evidence of the work's musical setting survives, and since its rediscovery and the musical possibilities suggested by the text have led to diverse interpretations by numerous composers including Philip Stopford, Edgar Pettman, Peter Warlock, R. R. Terry, Gustav Holst, Ronald Corp, David Willcocks, Philip Lawson, Thomas Hewitt Jones, and Richard Rodney Bennett.

These are sometimes titled "I saw a fair maiden" whereas "Myn Lyking" is used in the versions by R.R. Terry and Ronald Corp (as the first of the latter's Three Medieval Carols).

== Text ==
Middle English original spelling	Middle English converted	English modernisation
Refrain Lullay, myn lykyng, my dere sone, myn swetyng, Lullay, my dere herte, myn owyn dere derlyng.	Refrain; Lullay, mine Liking, my dere sone, mine sweting, Lullay, my dere herte, mine own dere derling.	Refrain; Lullay, mine Liking, my dear Son, mine Sweeting, Lullay, my dear heart, mine own dear darling.
I saw a fayr maydyn syttyn and synge, Sche lullyd a lytyl chyld, a swete lordyng, Refrain	I saw a fair maiden, sitten and singe, Sche lulled a litel child, a swete lording. Refrain	I saw a fair maiden, sitting and sing, She lulled a little child a sweet lording: Refrain
That eche lord is that that made alle thinge, Of alle lordis he is lord, of alle kynges kyng. Refrain	That eche lord is that that made alle thinge; Of alle lordes he is Lord, of alle Kinges king. Refrain	That very lord is He that made all things Of all lords He is Lord (and) King of all king. Refrain
Ther was mekyl melody at that chyldes berthe, Alle tho wern in hevene blys thei made mekyl merthe, Refrain	There was mekel melody at that childes berthe; Alle tho wern in hevene bliss, they made mekel merthe. Refrain	There was mickle (much) melody at that Child's birth, All that were in heaven's bliss, they made mickle mirth. Refrain
Aungelebryt thei song that nyt and seydyn to that chyld, "Blyssid be thou, and so be sche that is bothe mek and myld". Refrain	Aungele bright they song that night, and seiden to that child, "Blessed be thou, and so be sche that is bothe meke and mild." Refrain	Angels bright they sang that night and saiden to that Child, "Blessed be Thou, and so be she that is both meek and mild." Refrain
Prey we now to that chyld, and to his moder dere, Grawnt hem his blyssyng that now makyn chere. Refrain	Prey we now to that child, and to his moder dere, Graunt hem his blessing that now maken chere. Refrain	Pray we now to that Child, and to His mother dear, Grant them His blessing that now maken cheer. Refrain

== See also ==
- List of Christmas carols
