= Missale Aboense =

First book printed in Finland

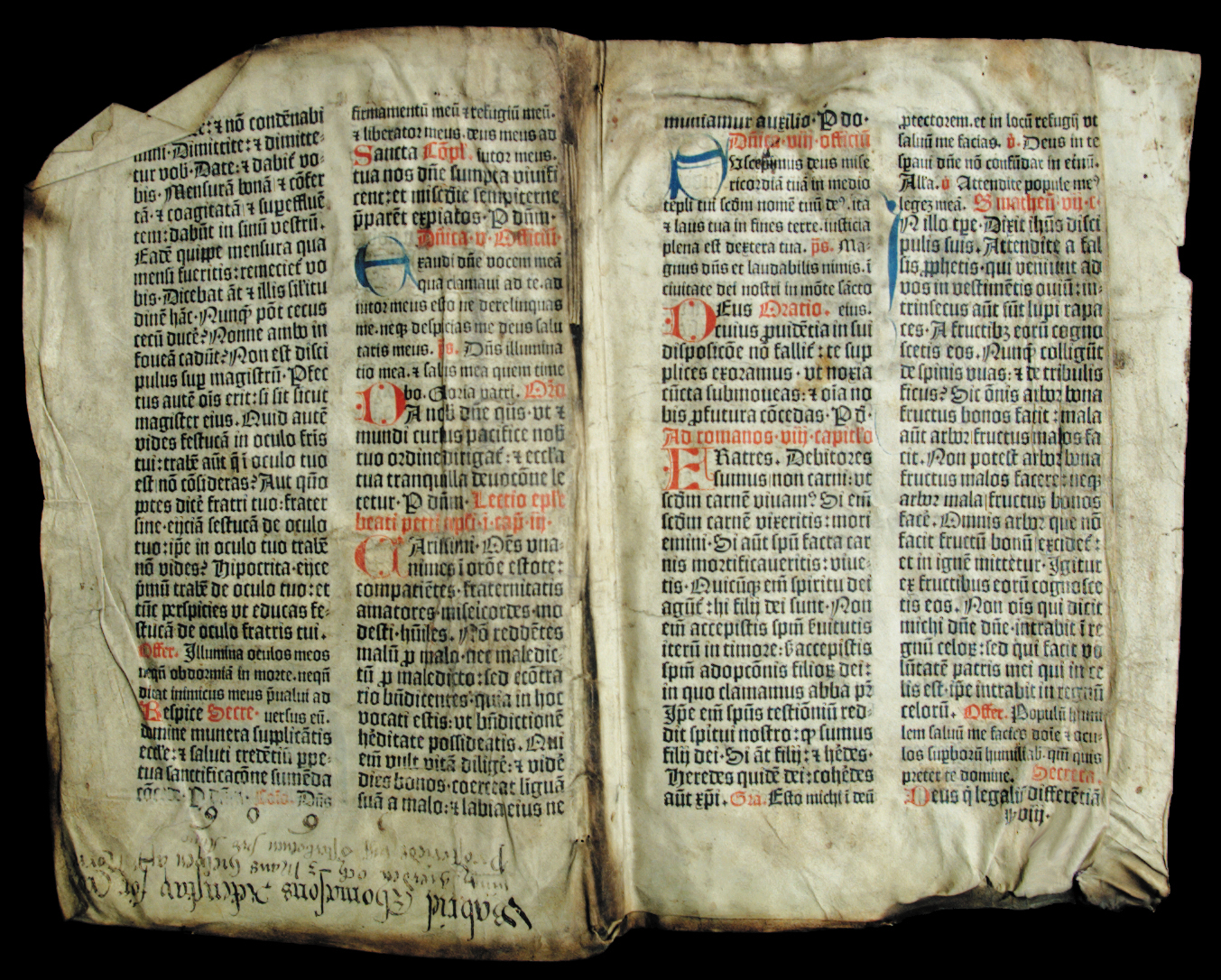
Missale Aboense

Missale Aboense was the first book printed for Finland. As its name suggests, it was a prayer book used for Mass. It follows the tradition of the Dominican liturgy, which around the year 1330 was adopted as the official liturgy of the See of Turku. This poor bishopric could not afford to have its own missal printed, but its Dominican tradition came to the rescue.

At the same time as the Missale Aboense was printed, a simultaneous printing appeared for the Dominican order's needs elsewhere in the Scandinavian countries. In the Missale Aboense the only main difference from this were the necessary local features of the Turku See in the Calendar of Saints.

At that time there were no printing shops in Finland. (The first one, in the Royal Academy of Turku, was established in 1642.) The Missale was commissioned by Bishop Konrad Bitz from the Lübeck printer Bartholomeus Ghotan. Bitz dated his introduction to the book, Turku, 17 August 1488, and it was published in the same year. The Missale was printed on both parchment and paper. This firstborn of Finnish literature ran to some 550 folio pages. With regard to beauty of typography, it still competes successfully for a leading place among Finnish books. A facsimile edition of the work was brought out in 1971 and 1988.

== See also ==
- Dominican Rite
- Piae Cantiones
