= St Mark Passion (Wood) =

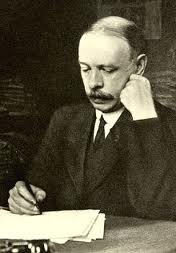
Charles Wood ca. 1910

The St Mark Passion (full title: The Passion of Our Lord According to Saint Mark) of Charles Wood is a musical composition written in 1920. The work calls for solo tenor (Evangelist), solo baritone (Jesus), chorus and organ, as well as minor roles for five solo basses (Judas, High Priest, Peter, Pilate, Bystander), a solo treble (Maid), and a solo treble or alto (Maid II). It was composed while Wood was employed at Gonville and Caius College, Cambridge and lasts on average around an hour.

== History ==
Sometime during Eastertide 1920, the Revd Dr Eric Milner-White, recovering in the Cambridge Nursing Home after an appendicitis operation, wrote a letter to Charles Wood, asking for him to consider a possible collaboration on a new piece of service music. As Dean of King's College, Cambridge, he had been asked by the school to provide more Passion music for the Easter season. He explains in the letter to Wood: the Passions of Johann Sebastian Bach would be too unwieldy for their resources, and the Bach cantatas would be theologically inappropriate. John Stainer's The Crucifixion (1887) had been regularly performed during Passiontide in Anglican Churches in England, and Milner-White was anxious to provide an alternative to the popular work.

Milner-White's ideas for a Passion cantata based on the Gospel of Mark divide the Passion into its five traditional parts, termed "Lessons": the Last Supper, Gethsemane and Betrayal, the Jewish Trial, the Roman Trial, and the Crucifixion. The intervals between the Lessons he proposes should be filled with either prayers and psalms, hymns, or interspersed stanzas of the hymn Sing, my tongue, the glorious battle, which is based on the plainchant tune Pange lingua gloriosi.

Wood responded by visiting Milner-White as he convalesced. During their meetings, the two refined the shape the musical setting of the Passion would assume. Wood composed the piece over the course of nine days 1 August to 9 August 1920. It received its first performance on Good Friday 1921 or 1922 at King's College Chapel.

== Text ==
Wood used the translation of Mark's Gospel from the King James Version of the Bible for use in his St Mark Passion:

- 1. Last Supper: 14.12b, 16a, 16c, 17-20, 22-26
- 2. Gethsemane and Betrayal: 14.32-46, 50
- 3. Trial before the High Priest: 14.52-55, 60-72
- 4. Trial before Pilate: 15.1-9, 11-20
- 5. The Crucifixion: 15.22-27, 29-37

He adds a short line of text for the tenor and bass chorus parts in measures 44 through 51 of the fourth Lesson ("One, release us.").

== Structure ==
The St Mark Passion begins with an organ introduction, followed by the four stanzas of the tune Sing, my tongue, the glorious battle. The first Lesson, concluding with Jesus and his disciples processing to the Mount of Olives, is followed by four verses of the hymn The Heavenly Word proceeding forth; the second verse ("By false disciple...") anticipates the coming Lesson of the betrayal.

After Jesus is betrayed by Judas and his disciples flee from the garden of Gethsemane, the choir and congregation sing the hymn Lord, when we bow before thy throne, reflecting on the abandonment of Jesus by his disciples after his seizure by the authorities.

The Jewish priests and elders condemn Jesus to death in the third Lesson. In the concluding section of the Lesson, Peter denies his association with Jesus, ultimately realizes his error in doing so, and weeps in despair; the choir sings the hymn My God, I love thee; not, commenting on Peter's desolation and his recognition of Jesus as Christ.

In the fourth Lesson, the crowd assembled before Pilate calls for Jesus' death by crucifixion, ending with another stanza of Sing, my tongue for divided trebles and altos, foreshadowing the Lesson of the Crucifixion ("Faithful Cross! above all other...").

The final Lesson is performed a cappella except for a five-measure organ prelude to the Lesson. After the chorus narrates that Jesus "gave up the ghost," the congregation prays in silence for a moment then recites a prayer of confession. The organ and male voices return with the musical material of the third stanza of Sing, my tongue from the opening set to another verse ("Bend thy bough, O Tree of Glory!"). The organ recapitulates a selection of the music from the introduction of the piece, and the choir and congregation close the Passion, once again singing the first verse of Sing, my tongue.

== Liturgical use ==
The first page of Faith Press publications of the St Mark Passion include instructions from Milner-White for use in a liturgical setting:

Before the Passion begins there should be a short devotion, such as the Lesser Litany and Lord’s Prayer, said by Priest and people in the natural voice.

During the singing of the Passion the people should sit for the first four Gospels [Lessons] and stand for the fifth. They should stand for all the Hymns, except where it is otherwise stated, and join in the verses marked with an asterisk.*
The Precentor in the fifth Gospel should always be, if possible, a Priest.
At the close of the fifth Gospel all present should kneel, and keep silence for a space, and then repeat together in the natural voice the form of the general confession provided.

After the last Hymn the Priests, choir and people should go out as quietly as possible.

Editions by the most recent publisher, Royal School of Church Music, include the liturgical instructions in the score itself. The publisher also prints separately the text of the Passion, including the hymn texts and prayers for use in worship.
