= Candlelight Carol =

Christmas carol by John Rutter

"Candlelight Carol" is a Christmas carol with music and lyrics by the English choral composer and conductor John Rutter. The carol was written in 1984 and was first recorded by Rutter's own group, the Cambridge Singers. "Candlelight Carol" focuses on describing the nativity of Jesus, particularly the love of Mary for her son Jesus.

== History ==
This carol was commissioned by John Romeri, then Director of Music at the Church of the Assumption in Bellevue, Pennsylvania. Romeri requested a carol celebrating the Virgin Mary.

Rutter drew inspiration from Geertgen's painting, Nativity at Night.

== Recordings ==
The carol was included on the Cambridge Singers' 1987 album Christmas Night.

It has since been recorded by many artists, including Neil Diamond (on his 1994 album The Christmas Album, Volume 2), Joseph McManners (on his 2005 album In Dreams), Aled Jones (including a version in Welsh), and several important choirs including the Mormon Tabernacle Choir.

It has become a fairly popular carol for choirs at Christmas concerts in the United Kingdom, the United States and other countries.

== See also ==
- List of Christmas carols
