= Gabriel's Message =

Basque Christmas folk carol

- Gabriel’s Message 23
- Christmas carol
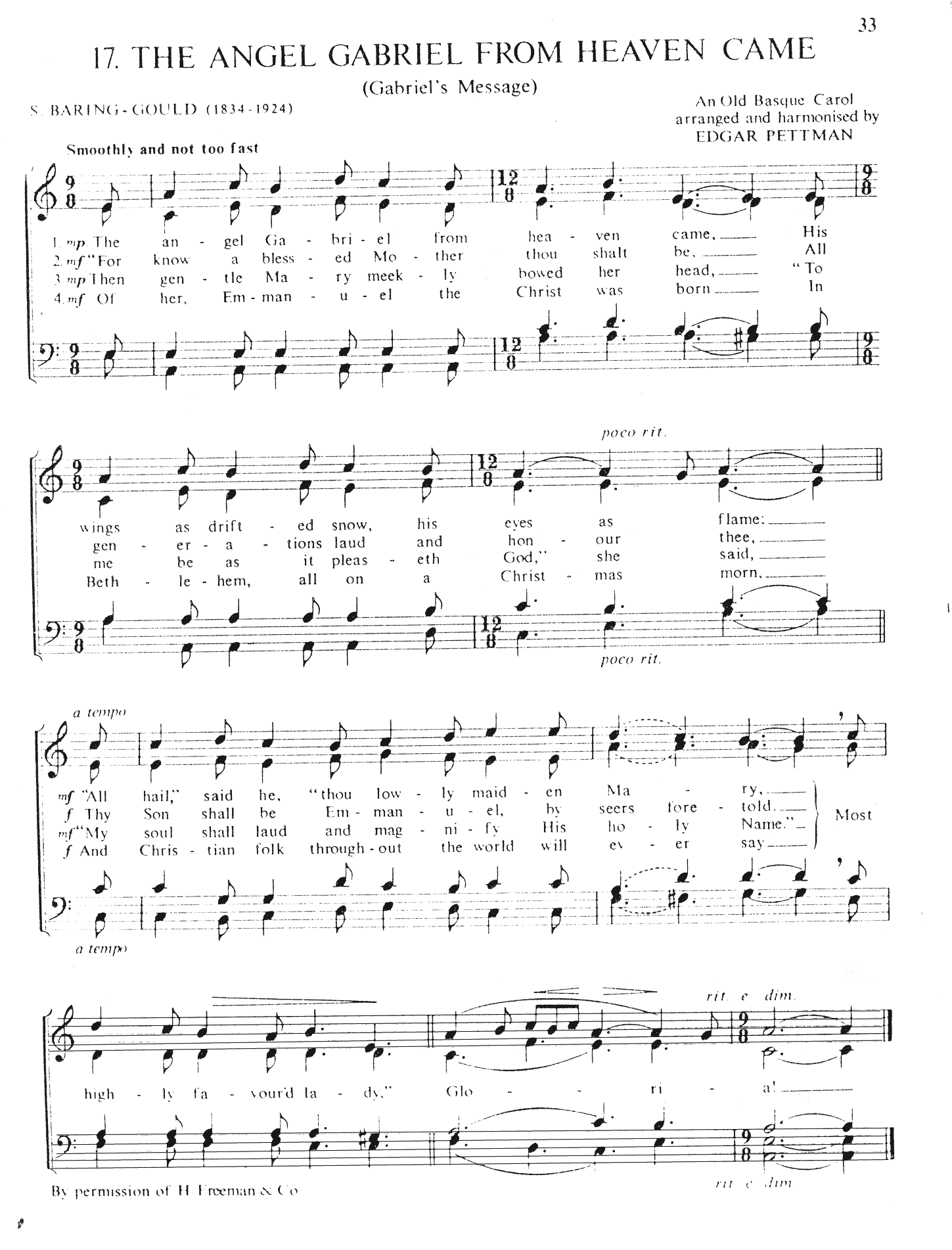
- The Angel Gabriel sheet music
- Native name: Birjina gaztetto bat zegoen
- Full title: The angel Gabriel from heaven came
- Text: The Magnificat
- Language: Basque
- Melody: "Angelus Ad Virginem"
- Composed: 13th century

"Gabriel's Message" or "The angel Gabriel from heaven came" (Basque: Birjina gaztetto bat zegoen) is a Basque Christmas folk carol about the Annunciation to the Virgin Mary by the archangel Gabriel that she would become the mother of Jesus Christ the Son of God.

== Text ==
It quotes the biblical account of the Annunciation (Luke, Chapter 1, verses 26–38) and Mary's Magnificat (Luke 1.46–55) with the opening lines:

The angel Gabriel from heaven came,
his wings as drifted snow, his eyes as flame;
"All hail", said he, "thou lowly maiden Mary,
most highly favoured lady." Gloria.

A Basque folk carol, originally based on Angelus ad virginem, a 13th or 14th Century Latin carol, it was collected by Charles Bordes (pub. Paris 1897) and then paraphrased into English by Sabine Baring-Gould (pub. 1922), who had spent a winter as a boy in the Basque country. The tune is called "Gabriel's Message". It is commonly performed in an arrangement by Edgar Pettman published in 1922.

The use of the lilting phrase "Most highly favoured lady" made it the favourite carol of Richard Harries, Bishop of Oxford.

== Recordings ==
Notable modern interpretations include a track on Sting's single "Russians" (1985) and on his album If on a Winter's Night... (2009). Sting's interpretation of this carol is part of the best-selling album A Very Special Christmas, first released in 1987. English rock band Marillion recorded a version for their 1999 fan club-exclusive album Christmas.Marillion, which was also performed on their 2003 DVD Christmas in the Chapel. Canadian roots musicians Terry McDade and The McDades on their 2001 release "Midwinter".

In 2004, it was recorded by Aled Jones on his album The Christmas Album. Jars of Clay recorded a version for its 2007 Christmas Songs album. Charlotte Church recorded a version of this song for the 2000 Holiday album Dream a Dream. Amanda Palmer is featured on Amazon's Exclusive Holiday Playlist "All Is Bright" singing the song a cappella, accompanied by a choir. Madonna use this reference to the Virgin Mary (Intro) on her The MDNA Tour on 2012. Ukrainian singer, composer and multi-instrumentalist Dilya made his version of "Gabriel's Message" in Ukrainian folk tradition using bandura, guitar and organ with ethnic female back vocals. It is the first single from his Christmas EP with the same name, released on December 20, 2015. Moya Brennan, the singer of the Irish band Clannad, recorded the song on her Christmas album of 2005, An Irish Christmas.

== See also ==
- List of Christmas carols
