= Songs of Syon =

Songs of Syon: A Collection of Hymns and Sacred Poems Mostly Translated from Ancient Greek, Latin and German Sources was produced by George Ratcliffe Woodward in 1904. In 1908, a new and enlarged edition was produced, with the title Songs of Syon: A Collection of Psalms, Hymns and Spiritual Songs for Public and Private Use. While the first edition had 201 items, this later edition had 431. Words and music were published separately. A third edition followed in 1910. A fourth edition, revised and enlarged, came out in 1923. This was primarily a reprint of the third edition, with musical errors corrected on the advice of Dr.Charles Wood. In a few cases, "finer melodies, or better harmonies, have been substituted." The hymnal was described by the writer of Woodward's Church Times obituary as "the finest hymn book, both as regards words and music, ever produced in England."

The tunes were categorised according to Plainsong, metrical melodies of 13th-16th centuries, Lutheran tunes, Old English and Scottish psalm tunes of 16th–17th centuries, and old French psalm tunes of the 17th century. Two tunes by Wood were included as were four by Richard Wagner. Fifty harmonisations are by Woodward and thirty apiece by Wood and Palmer. 120 of the texts were drawn from the translations of J.M. Neale, with 140 translations and 20 new compositions by Woodward. Six sets of words came from the Yattendon Hymnal, with words by Poet Laureate Robert Bridges.

== See also ==
- List of English-language hymnals by denomination
