= Past Three O'Clock =

English Christmas carol

"Past Three O'Clock" (or "Past Three a Clock") is an English Christmas carol, loosely based on the call of the traditional London waits, musicians and watchmen who patrolled during the night, using a musical instrument to show they were on duty and to mark the hours. The refrain dates from at least the early modern period, appearing in print in a 1665 supplement to John Playford's The Dancing Master.

The words were written by George Ratcliffe Woodward (1848–1934) to the traditional tune "London Waits". Woodward added lines to the traditional refrain in a style characteristic of his delight in archaic poetry. It was published in A Cambridge Carol Book: Being Fifty-two Songs for Christmas, Easter and Other Seasons in 1924.

The wording of the call used in the carol is attested in Samuel Pepys’ diary, the entry for 16 January 1660 contains:

I staid up till the bell-man came by with his bell just under my window as I was writing of this very line, and cried, “Past one of the clock, and a cold, frosty, windy morning.” I then went to bed, and left my wife and the maid a-washing still.

Numerous variations of the carol include an arrangement by William Llewellyn as a "quodlibet" for choir: London Waits (Past Three O'clock).

Recordings of the carol include those by the Choir of Clare College, Cambridge, the Choir of King's College, Cambridge, the Monteverdi Choir., the Renaissance Singers, James Galway and the National Philharmonic Orchestra and The Chieftains on the album The Bells of Dublin (1991). It features in the third movement of Patric Standford's A Christmas Carol Symphony (1978).

Popular music artists who have recorded the carol include Roger Whittaker on the album Tidings of Comfort and Joy (1984), Linda Ronstadt on the album A Merry Little Christmas (2000) and Chris Squire on the album Chris Squire's Swiss Choir (2007).

== See also ==
- List of Christmas carols
