= Unto Us Is Born a Son =

Medieval Christmas carol

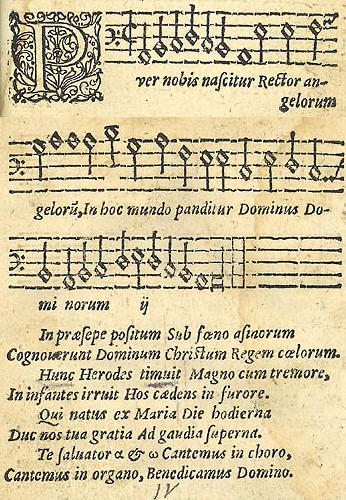
Puer nobis nascitur in the 1582 edition of Piae Cantiones, image combined from two pages of the source text

"Puer nobis nascitur", usually translated as "Unto Us Is Born a Son", is a medieval Christmas carol found in a number of manuscript sources—the 14th-century German Moosburg Gradual and a 15th-century Trier manuscript. The Moosburg Gradual itself contained a number of melodies derived from the 12th- and 13th-century organum repertories of Notre Dame de Paris and the Abbey of Saint Martial, Limoges, suggesting that its antiquity may be much greater.

The song was first published in the 1582 Finnish song book Piae Cantiones, a volume of 74 medieval songs with Latin texts collected by Jaakko Suomalainen, a Finnish Lutheran cleric, and published by T. P. Rutha, a Catholic printer. The song book had its origins in the libraries of cathedral song schools, whose repertory also had strong links with medieval Prague, where clerical students from Finland and Sweden had studied for generations. Songs from Piae Cantiones continued to be performed in Finland until the 19th century. A setting by Michael Praetorius appears in his Musae Sioniae VI.

The book became well known in Britain after a rare original copy of Piae Cantiones owned by Peter of Nyland was given as a gift to the British Minister in Stockholm. He subsequently gave it to John Mason Neale in 1852, and it was from this copy that Neale, in collaboration with Thomas Helmore published songs in two collections in 1853 and 1854 respectively, although this carol was not included in either.

The carol became popular as a processional hymn following a translation by George Ratcliffe Woodward first published in 1902. Percy Dearmer also translated the hymn for inclusion in The Oxford Book of Carols (1928) as "Unto Us a Boy Is Born". Both translations are commonly used.

Robert Cummings of the All Music Guide notes that, "Its text speaks of the birth of Christ and of his mission on Earth. The melody is glorious in its triumphant character and ecstatic devotional sense ... a radiant hymn of strong appeal, brighter and more colorful than most of the chants emerging from and before the fourteenth century." He goes on to suggest that the first phrase and indeed the whole melody resembles the much later hymn, "O God, Our Help in Ages Past".

== Text ==
Latin (1582)

Puer nobis nascitur
Rector angelorum;
In hoc mundo panditur
Dominus Dominorum.

In præsepe ponitur
Sub fœno asinorum.
Cognoverunt Dominum
Christum Regem cœlorum.

Hunc Herodes timuit –
Magno cum tremore,
In infantes irruit
Hos cædens in furore.

Qui natus ex Maria –
Die hodierna
Duc nos tua gratia
Ad gaudia superna.

Te saluator α & ω
Cantemus in choro,
Cantemus in organo,
Benedicamus domino.

G. R. Woodward (1902)

Unto us is born a son,
King of choirs supernal:
See on earth his life begun,
Of lords the Lord eternal.

Christ, from heav'n descending low,
Comes on earth a stranger;
Ox and ass their Owner know
Now cradled in a manger.

This did Herod sore affray,
And did him bewilder,
So he gave the word to slay,
And slew the little childer.

Of his love and mercy mild
Hear the Christmas story:
O that Mary's gentle Child
Might lead us up to glory!

O and A and A and O,
Cantemus in choro,
Voice and organ, sing we so,
Benedicamus Domino.

Percy Dearmer (1928)

Unto us a Boy is born,
King of all creation:
Came He to a world forlorn,
The Lord of every nation.

Cradled in a stall was He
'Midst the cows and asses;
But the very beasts could see
That He all men surpasses.

Herod then with fear was filled:
"A prince," he said, "in Jewry!"
All the little boys he killed
At Bethl'em in his fury.

Now may Mary's Son, who came
Long ago to love us,
Lead us all with hearts aflame
To the joys above us.

Omega and Alpha He!
Let the organ thunder,
While the choir with peals of glee
Rends the air asunder.

== Tune ==
The melody associated with this text appears in the 16th-century collection Piae Cantiones. The following setting is by G. H. Palmer as it appears in The New English Hymnal:

== See also ==
- List of Christmas carols
