= Richard Terry (musicologist) =

British composer (1865–1938)

Sir Richard Runciman Terry (3 January 1864 – 18 April 1938) was an English organist, choir director, composer and musicologist. He is noted for his pioneering revival of Tudor liturgical music.

== Early years ==
Richard Terry was born in 1864 in Ellington, Northumberland. At the age of 11 he started playing the organ at the local church. He was educated at various schools in South Shields, St Albans and London. In 1881 Terry was living in Jarrow and working as a Pupil Teacher. Terry then spent seventeen months as a non-collegiate person at Oxford (October 1887 to May 1889) and two years at Cambridge (1888–90), where he went as a non-collegiate student but became a choral scholar at King's College, Cambridge. There he also became a music critic for The Cambridge Review. At Cambridge, he was much influenced by the Professor of Music, Charles Villiers Stanford and the King's Chapel organist Arthur Henry Mann who taught him the techniques of choral singing and the training of boys' voices.

== Career in church music ==
Terry left Cambridge in 1890 without taking a degree. He was appointed School Master: Teacher of Music, Organist and School Choir Master at Bedford County School, (renamed Elstow School in 1907) Kempston, Bedfordshire. He was the organist at St. John's Cathedral, Antigua in 1892. Terry then taught and was Director of Music at Highgate School from September 1895 to December 1895. Terry became a Catholic in 1896, the year he was appointed organist and director of music at the Roman Catholic Benedictine Downside School in Somerset. It was here where he began the work of reviving the Latin music of Tudor English composers such as William Byrd and Thomas Tallis. He was greatly inspired by the revival of Gregorian chant by Dom Prosper Guéranger at Solesmes Abbey in France, which was to be an important part of the Downside musical repertoire.

In 1899 Terry took his Downside choir to Ealing, for the opening of the new Benedictine church, where they sang William Byrd's Mass for Five Voices and motets by Palestrina, Philips and Allegri. The archbishop of Westminster, cardinal Herbert Vaughan, was the preacher on the occasion and he decided that he would have Terry as his Master of Music at the newly built Westminster Cathedral.

Terry's time at Westminster Cathedral was marked by admiration and praise, as well as frustrations. In 1911, he received a honoris causa degree of Doctor of Music at Durham University, and in the same year, during the International Music Congress, a special session was held in the Cathedral of early English church music, sung by the Cathedral Choir.

While Terry's relation with Cardinal Vaughan was excellent, it was less so with his successor, Cardinal Francis Bourne. Bourne's different view on church music, a continual shortage of financial means to support the choir, the decrease in the number of lay clerks during and after the World War I, together with Terry's engagements in other things outside the Cathedral led to a prolonged period of tension.

Terry was forced to resign from the Cathedral in 1924, after coming under increasing criticism for his erratic behaviour and neglect of duty, including: neglecting administrative work, taking off without leave for weeks at a time, cancelling choir rehearsals without notice, dismissing Lay Clerks without proper procedure, taking on too many engagements outside his Cathedral work and tensions due to his inconsistent approach to congregational singing at the Cathedral. Nonetheless, during this time he was able to establish a choral tradition of great merit at the Cathedral, developing a repertoire of both Gregorian chant and polyphonic music. The choir's particular focus on renaissance polyphony is believed to have influenced the emerging school of 20th century English composers and the performance of church music in England.

== Contribution to music ==
The Grove Dictionary of Music and Musicians credits Terry with the revival of much English church music, including Peter Philips' Cantiones sacrae, Byrd's three and five part masses and Gradualia and Cantiones sacrae, Tallis' mass and lamentations, William Mundy's Mass Upon the Square and many motets by Thomas Morley, Christopher Tye and others. Much of this work resulted in his editing and publishing performing editions of this music including 24 motets in Novello's series of Tudor motets. He also published the first modern editions of Calvin's first psalter of 1539 and the Scottish Psalter of 1635. In 1912 he edited the Westminster Hymnal.

In 1921, in an obvious departure from his church music, he edited the Curwen edition of 'The Shanty Book' (2 vols.) The foreword was written by Sir Walter Runciman, acknowledging that the time of the shanty was over, along with sail-powered merchant ships. Terry's 'Introduction' gives an excellent insight into the shanty as the sailor's work song, deferring to the well-known shanty collection by Capt. W. B. Whall 'Sea Songs, Ships and Shanties' (1910 & 1912), above other accounts written between 1887 and 1920. The collection of 65 shanties in two volumes also includes explanations for their use at sea, and his extensive comments give us a deal of valuable information about a particular aspect of social and maritime history.

Following his resignation from Westminster Cathedral he went on to work as a musical editor, journalist and academic. He was the initial editor of the Oxford University Press series Tudor Church Music, although by the time this series was completed he had been ousted from the editorship.

He was awarded a knighthood for his services to music in the 1922 Dissolution Honours.

== Composer ==
Terry was also a composer of church music, most notably of hymn tunes, several of which are in use today. These include Highwood (to the words 'Hark, what a sound' and 'O Perfect Love'), Billing (setting 'Praise to the holiest in the height'), and many carols, including the popular Myn Lyking, one of a set of 12 original carols published in 1912. Terry was a central figure in the revival of the carol, establishing regular carol singing at Westminster Cathedral and publishing more of his own carols in the 1920s, including the Three Cradle Songs (published in 1924, though dating from 1905-1907).

All of his original compositions are choral, and include anthems, motets and masses. His largest single composition was the four-part Mass of St. Gregory for choir and organ, composed in 1896. The motet Tu es Petrus, written for the Cardiff Catholic Choral Society in 1914, was his last substantial composition.

== Select bibliography ==
- Catholic Church Music, 1907 (enlarged in 1931 as The Music of the Roman Rite)
- Old Rhymes with New Tunes, Longmans, Green & Co, 1912 (illustrated by Gabriel Pippet)
- The Westminster Hymnal, 1912
- The Shanty Book, Curwen & Sons (2 vols., 1921 and 1926)
- On Music's Borders, 1927, a collection of essays
- A Forgotten Psalter and Other Essays, OUP, 1929
- Two Hundred Folk Carols, 1933
- Voodooism in Music and Other Essays, a collection published in 1934
