= Piae Cantiones =

Collection of late medieval Latin songs

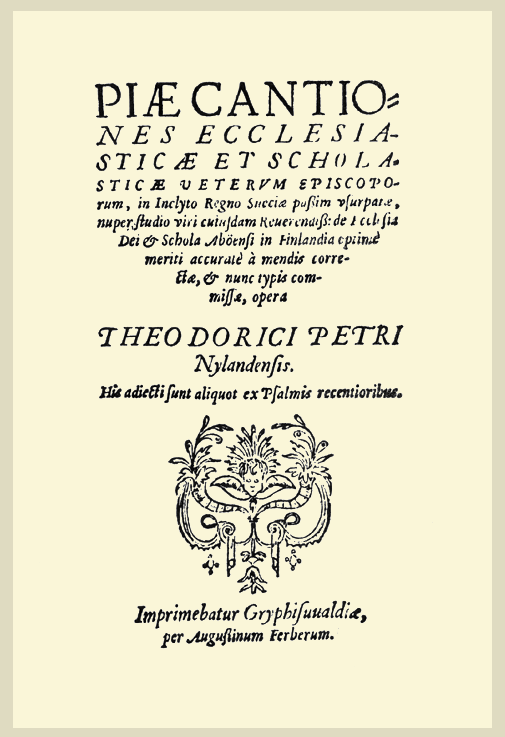
Piae Cantiones, 1582.

Piae Cantiones ecclesiasticae et scholasticae veterum episcoporum (in English Pious ecclesiastical and school songs of the ancient bishops) is a collection of late medieval Latin songs first published in 1582. It was compiled by Jacobus Finno, a clergyman who was headmaster of the cathedral school at Turku. Publication was undertaken by Theodoricus Petri Rutha of Nyland, who lived from about 1560 to about 1630. He came from an aristocratic family in Finland, and was educated at Rostock.

The collection Piae Cantiones was published in Greifswald, duchy of Pomerania, Germany, and includes 74 Latin and Swedish/Latin songs that were sung at the time in Finnish cathedral schools, most notably in the cathedral school at Turku. Most of them are religious in nature but some, for example Tempus adest floridum, are secular school songs. The lyrics in the collection testify to the moderate nature of the Protestant Reformation in Sweden. Although some Catholic nuances have been purged, many songs still carry strong traces of the cult of Virgin Mary (e.g. Ave Maris Stella). Although published as late as 1582, the melodies of Piae Cantiones are medieval by nature. The origin of the songs and melodies varies. Many originate from Central Europe but quite a few seem to have been written in Nordic countries.

In 1625 the collection was re-published with 13 further songs.

Later versions of this collection were compiled by Finns Henricus Fattbuur and Mathias Tolia. A Finnish translation of Piae Cantiones (1616) was done by Hemminki of Masku (Hemming), who earlier (1605) had published a remarkable Finnish hymnal. The songs of Piae Cantiones were popular in Finnish schools until the 19th century but fell gradually into disuse. However, a newly awakened interest in this old music has made them quite popular and they form part of the standard repertoire of many Finnish and Swedish choirs. Many of Hemming's translations are present (with some modernization) in the official book of anthems of the Evangelical Lutheran Church of Finland.

== Piae Cantiones in English ==
In 1853 the British ambassador to Sweden, G. J. R. Gordon, returned to Britain with a copy of the 1582 edition, which he presented to John Mason Neale, well known for his interest in early music. He in turn passed it on to Thomas Helmore whom he knew to be expert in the interpretation of the mensural notation in which the tunes were given. On receiving the tunes in modern notation Neale translated the texts into English, or in a few cases wrote completely new texts. Neale and Helmore published 12 of these tunes in that same year with the title Carols for Christmastide, and the following year 12 more as Carols for Eastertide. The Christmas set included Christ was born on Christmas Day from Resonet in laudibus, Good Christian men, rejoice from In dulci jubilo, and Good King Wenceslas as completely new words for the spring carol Tempus adest floridum. The Easter set included Let the song be begun from Personent hodie.

In Helmore's 1854 The Hymnal Noted, Divinum mysterium became, with words inspired by Prudentius' poem Corde natus ex parentis, Of the father sole begotten. Subsequent settings were made by these and other authors, such as Puer nobis nascitur (Unto Us is Born a Son) and Gaudete.

In 1910 an edition of the original, entitled Piae Cantiones: A Collection of Church & School Song, chiefly Ancient Swedish, originally published in A.D. 1582 by Theodoric Petri of Nyland, was published in England by the Plainsong and Medieval Music Society, with a preface and notes by George Ratcliffe Woodward.

A number of pieces translated from Piae Cantiones were arranged by Sir David Willcocks, Reginald Jacques and John Rutter and published in their popular 1961 collection, Carols for Choirs, and in subsequent volumes in this series.

== See also ==
- Missale Aboense
