= The Holly and the Ivy =

Traditional British folk Christmas carol

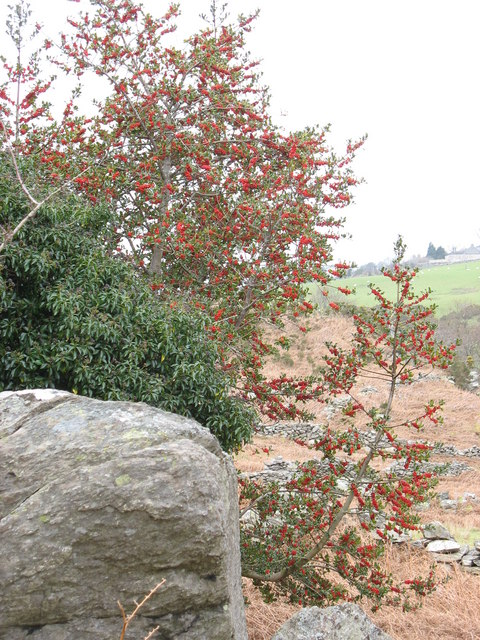
- Holly and ivy in Wales
- Genre: Christmas carol
- Text: English traditional carol
- Meter: 7.6.8.6 with refrain

"The Holly and the Ivy" with piano accompaniment by Cecil James Sharp (1911)

"The Holly and the Ivy" is a traditional British folk Christmas carol, listed as number 514 in the Roud Folk Song Index. The song can be traced only as far as the early nineteenth century, but the lyrics reflect an association between holly and Christmas dating back at least as far as medieval times. The lyrics and melody varied significantly in traditional communities, but the song has since become standardised. The version which is now popular was collected in 1909 by the English folk song collector Cecil Sharp from a woman called Mary Clayton, in the market town of Chipping Campden in Gloucestershire, England.

Trans-Siberian Orchestra's "The Prince of Peace" is set to the same music.

== Words ==
The following are taken from Sharp's English Folk-Carols (1911), the publication that first established the current words and melody:

1. The holly and the ivy,
When they are both full grown,
Of all the trees that are in the wood,
The holly bears the crown.

REFRAIN:
The rising of the sun
And the running of the deer,
The playing of the merry organ,
Sweet singing in the choir.

2. The holly bears a blossom,
As white as the lily flower,
And Mary bore sweet Jesus Christ,
To be our sweet Saviour. (Refrain)

3. The holly bears a berry,
As red as any blood,
And Mary bore sweet Jesus Christ
For to do us sinners good. (Refrain)

4. The holly bears a prickle,
As sharp as any thorn,
And Mary bore sweet Jesus Christ
On Christmas Day in the morn. (Refrain)

5. The holly bears a bark,
As bitter as any gall,
And Mary bore sweet Jesus Christ
To redeem us all. (Refrain)

6. The holly and the ivy,
When they are both full grown,
Of all the trees that are in the wood,
The holly bears the crown. (Refrain)

== History ==
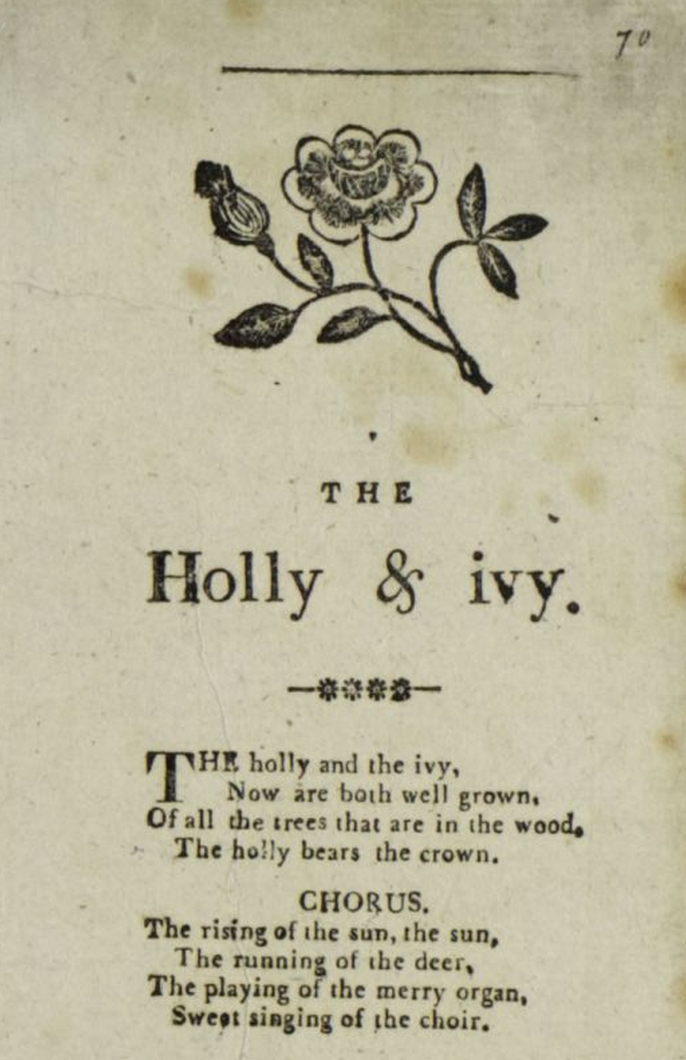
First verse from an anonymous broadside published by H. Wadsworth, Birmingham, 1814–1818. Note the repetition of "the sun".

The words of the carol occur in three broadsides published in Birmingham in the early 19th century.

An early mention of the carol's title occurs in William Hone's 1823 work Ancient Mysteries Described, which includes "The holly and the ivy, now are both well grown" among an alphabetical list of "Christmas Carols, now annually printed" that were in the author's possession.

The complete words of the carol are found in a book review dating from 1849, in which the reviewer suggested using the text of "The Holly and the Ivy" in place of one of the readings found in the book under discussion. The anonymous reviewer introduced the lyrics of carol thus:

Instead of passages from Bernard Barton, however, and Mary Howitt, we think we could have gathered more from the seventeenth century poets; and especially might larger use have been made of that touchingly simple class of religious ballads, which under the name of carols, &c., is so rife throughout the rural districts, and the humbler quarters of England's great towns. Many of these are only orally preserved, but with a little trouble a large number might be recovered. We have before us at this time a collection of carols printed in the cheapest form, at Birmingham, uniting for the most part extreme simplicity, with distinct doctrinal teaching, a combination which constitutes the excellence of a popular religious literature. From this little volume we will extract one which might well take the place of the passage from Milton for Christmas Day. It is called the "Holly and the Ivy."

The words of the carol were included in Sylvester's 1861 collection A Garland of Christmas Carols where it is claimed to originate from "an old broadside, printed a century and a half since" [i.e. around 1711]: Husk's 1864 Songs of the Nativity also includes the carol, stating:

This carol appears to have nearly escaped the notice of collectors, as it has been reprinted by one alone, who states his copy to have been taken from "an old broadside, printed a century and a half since," i.e. about 1710. It is still retained on the broadsides printed at Birmingham.

Early English Lyrics by Chambers and Sidgwick, published in 1907, repeats Husk's statement.

== Variants ==
There have been many variants collected from traditional singers and early printed versions which differ significantly from the now popular version. The most popular traditional variant seems to have been "The Holly Bears a Berry", whilst the more familiar "The Holly and the Ivy" variant was sung with a variety of tunes and lyrics.

=== Lyrics ===
Textual variants differing from Sharp (1911) (first verse and chorus)
Variant	Wadsworth (1814–1818)	Bloomer (1817–1827)	Wrighton (1812–1830)	The Theologian (1849)	Sylvester (1861)	Husk (1864)
verse 1 line 2: Now are both well grown	X	X	X	X	X	X
chorus line 1: The rising of the sun, the sun,	X
chorus line 2: ~~And~~ The running of the deer	X	X	X	X	X	X
chorus line 3: The playing of the merry groan [sic]			X
chorus line 4: Sweet singing of the choir	X
chorus line 4: The singing in the choir					X	X

== Music ==
=== Standard melody ===
The popular melody for the carol was first published in Cecil Sharp's 1911 collection English Folk-Carols. Sharp states that he heard the tune sung by "Mrs. Mary Clayton, at Chipping Campden", a quaint town in the Cotswolds. Sharp's manuscript transcription of Clayton's singing of the third verse, dated "Jan 13th 1909", is archived in the Cecil Sharp Manuscript Collection at Clare College, Cambridge and viewable online. The melody is notable in being confined to the notes of a hexachord.

Melody as first published in Sharp, English Folk-Carols (1911)

Tune

Piano arrangement

=== Other melodies ===
The words have traditionally been sung to countless folk melodies, including three further tunes having been collected in Gloucestershire alone. Some traditional recordings have been made which demonstrate this melodic variety; these include one sung by Peter Jones of Ross-on-Wye, Herefordshire, and another performed by Bessie Wallace of Camborne, Cornwall in the early 1930s and recorded by James Madison Carpenter, which is publicly available on the Vaughan Williams Memorial Library website. The "Sans Day Carol", considered a variant of the song, is associated with a different tune.

The early nineteenth-century sources do not provide music for the carol. Several late nineteenth-century collections set the words to "old French carol" in D minor.

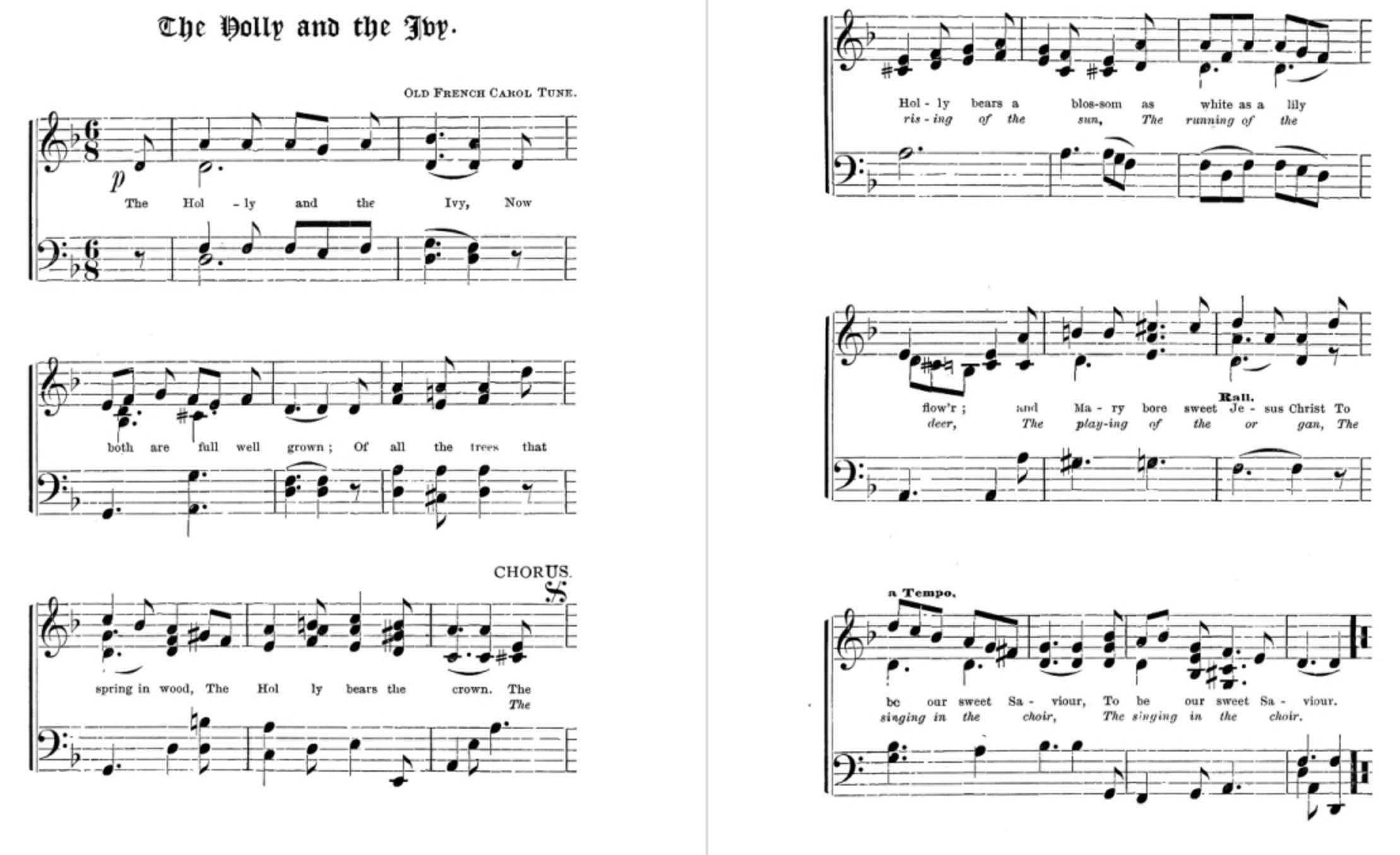
Set to an "Old French Carol"

== Cultural background ==
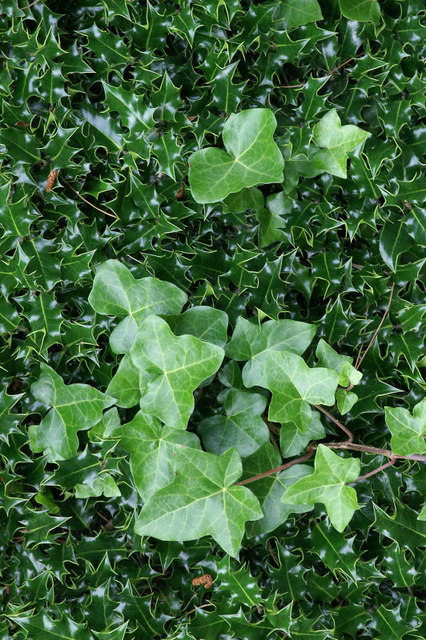
Green holly and ivy

Holly, especially the variety found in Europe, is commonly referenced at Christmas time, and is often referred to by the name Christ's thorn. Since medieval times the plant has carried a Christian symbolism, as expressed in this popular Christmas carol "The Holly and the Ivy", in which the holly represents Jesus and the ivy represents His mother, the Virgin Mary. Angie Mostellar discusses the Christian use of holly at Christmas, stating that:

Christians have identified a wealth of symbolism in its form. The sharpness of the leaves help to recall the crown of thorns worn by Jesus; the red berries serve as a reminder of the drops of blood that were shed for salvation; and the shape of the leaves, which resemble flames, can serve to reveal God's burning love for His people. Combined with the fact that holly maintains its bright colors during the Christmas season, it naturally came to be associated with the Christian holiday.

As such, holly and ivy have been a mainstay of British Advent and Christmas decorations for Church use since at least the fifteenth and sixteenth centuries, when they were mentioned regularly in churchwardens' accounts (Roud 2004).

Holly and ivy figure in the lyrics of the "Sans Day Carol". The music was first published by Cecil Sharp. Sir Henry Walford Davies wrote a popular choral arrangement that is often performed at the Festival of Nine Lessons and Carols and by choirs around the world. Henry VIII wrote a love song Green Groweth the Holly which alludes to holly and ivy resisting winter blasts and not changing their green hue So I am and ever hath been Unto my lady true.

Hone's 1823 Ancient Mysteries Described, which lists the carol's title as mentioned above, also describes (p 94) a British Museum manuscript: The same volume contains a song on the Holly and the Ivy which I mention because there is an old Carol on the same subject still printed. The MS begins with,

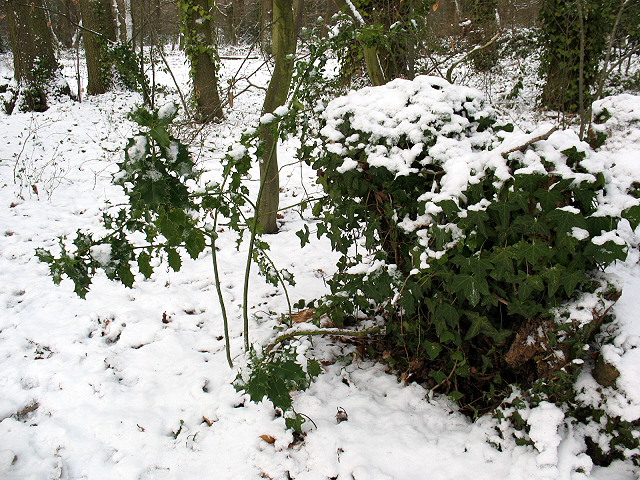
Holly and ivy in the snow in Elmstead Wood

Nay, my nay, hyt shal not be I wys,
Let holy hafe the maystry, as the maner ys:

Holy stond in the hall, faire to behold,
Ivy stond without the dore, she ys ful sore acold,
Nay, my nay etc

Holy and hys mery men, they dawnseyn and they syng,
Ivy and hur maydyns, they wepen and they wryng.

Nay, my nay etc

"The Holly and the Ivy" is also related to an older carol described by Sharp as: "The Contest of the Ivy and the Holly", a contest between the traditional emblems of woman and man respectively.

Holly stands in the hall, fair to behold:
Ivy stands without the door, she is full sore a cold.
Nay, ivy, nay, it shall not be I wis;
Let holly have the mastery, as the manner is.

Holly and his merry men, they dance and they sing,
Ivy and her maidens, they weep and they wring.
Nay, ivy, nay, etc

Ivy hath chapped fingers, she caught them from the cold,
So might they all have, aye, that with ivy hold.
Nay, ivy, nay, etc

Holly hath berries red as any rose,
The forester, the hunter, keep them from the does.
Nay, ivy, nay, etc

Ivy hath berries black as any sloe;
There come the owl and eat him as she go.
Nay, ivy, nay, etc

Holly hath birds a fair full flock,
The nightingale, the popinjay, the gentle laverock.
Nay, ivy, nay, etc

Good ivy, what birds hast thou?
None but the owlet that cries how, how.
Nay, ivy, nay, etc

== See also ==
- List of Christmas carols
