= George Ratcliffe Woodward =

English composer (1848–1934)

George Ratcliffe Woodward (27 December 1848 – 3 March 1934) was an English Anglican priest who wrote mostly religious verse, both original and translated from ancient authors. The best-known of these were written to fit traditional melodies, mainly of the Renaissance. He sometimes harmonised these melodies himself, but usually left this to his frequent collaborator, composer Charles Wood.

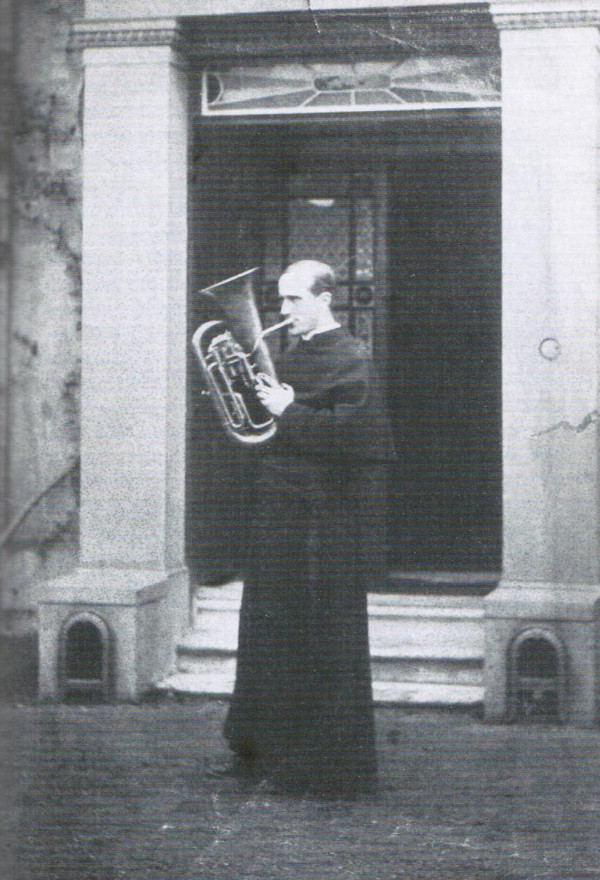
George Ratcliffe Woodward

== Early life ==
He was born at 26 Hamilton Square, Birkenhead, the son of George Ratcliffe Woodward, a merchant of Litherland, and his wife Ann De(a)ville Owen. The daughter of John Owen of Field House, Marchington, his mother had two clerical brothers, John Owen and Robert Deaville Owen (1823–1904).

Woodward was educated at Elstree School, then Harrow School. In 1867 he won a Sayer Scholarship to Gonville and Caius College, Cambridge. He graduated in 1872, with a third class in the Classics Tripos. Influences from his student time were the High Church tone of St Giles' Church, Cambridge, and the hymnist John Mason Neale.

== Curate, vicar and rector ==
On 21 December 1874 Woodward was ordained deacon, to serve as Assistant Curate at St Barnabas, Pimlico, and priest in 1875. At the time George Cosby White was vicar there; he was replaced in 1876 by Francis Lloyd Bagshawe, who died in 1878, and then Alfred Gurney from 1879. To the church's musical tradition, Woodward contributed as an instrumentalist, on the cello and euphonium, and in 1876 helped recruit G. H. Palmer as organist.

In September 1882 Woodward moved to St Mary and All Saints, Little Walsingham with Houghton St Giles, in Norfolk. He moved as rector to Chelmondiston, near Ipswich, in 1888.

== Later life ==
In 1894, after the death of his wife, Woodward returned to St Barnabas, Pimlico, as a curate, Assistant Priest and precentor. He helped create the St Barnabas Choral Society, and continued his interests in carols and plainsong. He stayed to 1899.

Woodward then worked on editing the Cowley Carol Book. It was published in parts, appearing in 1901, 1902 and 1919. For a period he was at the Berkeley Chapel, Mayfair assisting Percy Dearmer. He then was at St Mark's, Marylebone Road. For this time Crockford's records that Woodward was a licensed preacher for the diocese of London, from 1899 to 1903, and at St Mark's from 1903 to 1906; with nothing then until a permission to officiate in 1917. St Mark's Marylebone was a chapel of ease and daughter church of St Marylebone Parish Church. In 1903 architectural alterations by George Frederick Bodley had just been completed, in the aftermath of a ritualism court case around the Rev. Morris Joseph Fuller. Fuller's successor was James Granville Adderley, vicar at St Mark's from 1901 to 1904, and he was followed by James Newland Newland-Smith (died 1944). There is evidence that Woodward became unhappy with the religious tone at St Mark's, in the form of the amplification by Owen Chadwick of Adderley's anecdote:

When the incumbent of a London church invited preachers too unorthodox for the curate's mind, the curate used to sit in the sedilia fuming and relieved his feelings by muttering the Athanasian creed.

In 1924 Woodward received an honorary Lambeth Doctorate in Music. He died at 48 West Hill, Highgate on 3 March 1934. His interment was at Little Walsingham, Norfolk, on 8 March 1934. His hobbies included bellringing and beekeeping.

== Works ==
Woodward self-published his own verse. His works included:

- Carols for Christmas-Tide (1892). It included a translation of Puer nobis nascitur.
- Carols for Christmas-Tide, Series II (1893). Translations and Woodward's Come, Listen to My Story.
- Carols for Easter and Ascension-tide (1894) with one original composition: This joyful Eastertide. For it Woodward supplied the words, and Charles Wood arranged an old psalm melody from the Netherlands. This work was dedicated to Woodward's late wife.
- Hymns and Carols for Christmas-tide (1897)
- Legends of the Saints (1898), verse
- The Seven Sleepers of Ephesus (1902)
- Poemata (1903)
- Songs of Syon (1904). It contains translations from Latin and German by Woodward.
- Piae Cantiones (1910), editor, compiled for the Plainsong and Medieval Music Society. Woodward had been one of the founders of the society, more than 20 years earlier, with Walter Frere, Athelstan Riley and others.
- Barlaam and Ioasaph (1914), translation with Harold Mattingly, from the Greek of John of Damascus.
- The Acathist Hymn of the Holy Orthodox Church in the Original Greek Text and done into English Verse (1917), co-author with the ecumenist William John Birkbeck.
- An Italian Carol Book (1920), with Charles Wood
- Hymns of the Greek Church (1922)
- A Cambridge Carol Book: Being Fifty-two Songs for Christmas, Easter and Other Seasons (1924), with Wood. It included "Ding Dong Merrily on High" and "Past Three O'Clock".

== Family ==
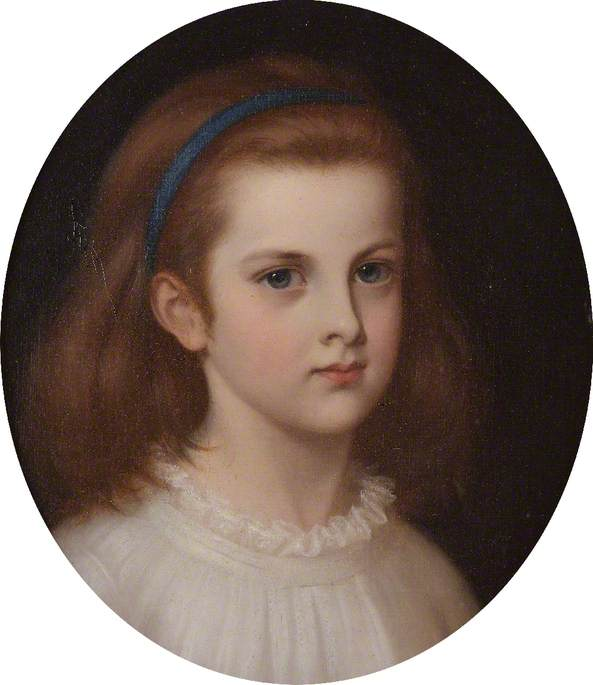
Alice Dorothy Lee Warner, 1866 portrait

In 1889 Woodward married Alice Dorothy Lee-Warner (1860–1893), at St Barnabas, Pimlico. She was the daughter of the late Rev. Septimus Lee-Warner, once vicar of Walsingham. She died in October 1893, and was buried in Walsingham.
