= The Cowley Carol Book =

Anglican collection of carols

The Cowley Carol Book was edited by George Ratcliffe Woodward and was published in 1901 and 1919, in two parts, ('First' and 'Second' Series). It was subtitled as a selection of carols "for Christmas, Easter and Ascensiontide".

== Details ==
The First Series was produced by George Ratcliffe Woodward, and for the second, later volume he was assisted by Charles Wood.

The First Series (1901, revised 1902) contained 39 carols, some already published in J. M. Neale and T. Helmore's "Carols for Christmas-tide, 1853 and Carols for Easter-tide, 1854" The second edition of the first volume (1902) had 65 carols – 42 for Christmas and Epiphany, 20 for Easter and 3 for Ascensiontide.

The Second Series with 37 carols was delayed by World War I, until 1919. Of the carols, 27 are for Christmas and Epiphany, two for Passion-tide and nine for Easter and Ascension. Charles Wood co-edited this second volume.

A third of the texts are by John Mason Neale, and the rest by Thomas Helmore and Woodward himself. Woodward harmonised almost half of the items in Series I, but only of four of those in Series II. 'Up! Good Christen Folk and Listen' and 'Come rock the cradle for Him' made their first appearances in the book. There are many translations, from German, Latin and Greek included, and some are macaronic, that is, involving more than one language in a text.

The 1927 edition of both volumes was published by A. R. Mowbray & Co. Ltd.

== Background ==
The origin of the title lies in a request for a carol book from the parish of St John, Cowley. The parish church was associated with the Society of St John the Evangelist, also known as the "Cowley Fathers". Richard Meux Benson was one of the three founders of the Society while he was incumbent at the Cowley church. He was an enthusiast for monastic and parish music.

== See also ==
- List of Christmas carols
