= Charles Wood (composer) =

Irish composer (1866–1926)

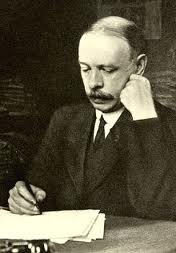
- Born: 22 June 1866; Armagh, Ireland, UK
- Died: 12 July 1926 (aged 60); Cambridge, England, UK
- Occupations: Organist; Composer; Academic teacher
- Spouse: Charlotte Wills-Sandford

Charles Wood (15 June 1866 – 12 July 1926) was an Irish composer and teacher; his students included Ralph Vaughan Williams at Cambridge and Herbert Howells at the Royal College of Music. He is primarily remembered and performed as an Anglican church music composer, but he also wrote songs and chamber music, particularly for string quartet.

== Early life and education ==
Born in Vicars' Hill in the Cathedral precincts of Armagh, Ireland, Charles was the fifth child and third son of Charles Wood Sr. and Jemima Wood. The boy was a treble chorister in the choir of the nearby St. Patrick's Cathedral (Church of Ireland). His father sang tenor as a stipendiary 'Gentleman' or 'Lay Vicar Choral' in the Cathedral choir and was also the Diocesan Registrar of the church. He was a cousin of Irish composer Ina Boyle. The organist and composer William G Wood (1859-1895), also associated with Cambridge, was his elder brother.

Wood received his early education at the Cathedral Choir School and also studied organ with two organists and masters of the Boys of Armagh Cathedral, Robert Turle and his successor Dr Thomas Marks. In 1883 he became one of fifty inaugural class members of the Royal College of Music, studying composition with Charles Villiers Stanford and Charles Hubert Hastings Parry primarily, and horn and piano secondarily. Following four years of training, he continued his studies at Selwyn College, Cambridge until 1889.

== Teaching career ==
He began teaching harmony and counterpoint at Selwyn College. In 1889 he attained a teaching position at Gonville and Caius College, Cambridge, first as organ scholar and then as fellow in 1894, becoming their first director of music and organist. He was instrumental in the reflowering of music at the college, though more as a teacher and organiser of musical events than as composer. After Stanford died in 1924, Wood assumed his mentor's vacant role as Professor of Music at the University of Cambridge.

According to his successor at Cambridge, Edward J Dent, as a teacher of composition, Wood "was surpassed only by Stanford himself [and] as a teacher of counterpoint and fugue he was unequalled". His pupils at Cambridge included Ralph Vaughan Williams, Nicholas Gatty, Arthur Bliss, Cecil Armstrong Gibbs and W Denis Browne. Dent says that, because Stanford did not reside in Cambridge, Wood took on the real burden of teaching for many years before his own election as Professor of Music, by which time his health was already undermined. He died in July 1926 after only two years in the post.

== Personal life ==
He married Charlotte Georgina Wills-Sandford, daughter of William Robert Wills-Sandford, of Castlerea, County Roscommon, Ireland, on 17 March 1898. They had two sons and three daughters, including Lieutenant Patrick Bryan Sandford Wood R.A.F. (1899-1918), who was killed in an aircraft accident during the First World War and is buried at Taranto, Italy. The family's address in Cambridge was 17, Cranmer Road.

Wood is buried at the Parish of the Ascension Burial Ground in Cambridge, together with his wife. There is a memorial to him in the north aisle at St Patrick's Cathedral, Armagh.

== Music ==
Like his better-known colleague Stanford, Wood is chiefly remembered for his Anglican church music: there are over 250 sacred works and many hymn tunes. As well as his Communion Service in the Phrygian Mode, his settings of the Magnificat and Nunc dimittis are still popular with cathedral and parish church choirs, particularly the services in F, D and G, and the two settings in E flat. During Passiontide his St Mark Passion, written in 1920 for Eric Milner-White, the then Dean of King’s College, Cambridge, is sometimes performed. It demonstrates Wood's interest in modal composition, in contrast to the late romantic harmonic style he more usually employs. His anthems with organ, Expectans expectavi, and O Thou, the Central Orb are both frequently performed and recorded; as are his unaccompanied anthems Tis the day of Resurrection, Glory and Honour and, most popular of all, Hail, gladdening light and its lesser-known equivalent for men's voices, Great Lord of Lords.

According to Jeremy Dibble all Wood's a cappella music demonstrates craftsmanship and mastery of the genre, and he is resourceful in his accompanied choral works which sometimes include unison sections and have stirring organ accompaniments, conveying a satisfying warmth and richness of emotional expression appropriate to his carefully chosen texts. Wood collaborated with priest and poet George Ratcliffe Woodward in the revival and popularisation of Renaissance tunes to new English religious texts, notably co-editing three books of carols including The Cowley Carol Book. Their collaboration also produced Songs of Syon.

After the fashion of the time Wood composed a series of secular choral cantatas between 1885 and 1905, including On Time (1897-8, setting Milton), Dirge for Two Veterans (1901, setting Walt Whitman), and A Ballad of Dundee (1904, setting W.E. Aytoun). There were also many part songs (such as Full Fathom Five), madrigals (including If Love be Dead, setting Coleridge) and solo songs, one of which, Ethiopia Saluting the Colours (setting Walt Whitman) attained high popularity. Wood was also the co-founder (in 1904) of the Irish Folk Song Society. His arrangement of The Irish Famine Song (The Praties They Grow Small Over Here) was recorded in the early 1920s by the Russian tenor Vladimir Rosing, and released on Vocalion A-0168.

He also composed eight string quartets (six numbered, plus the Variations on an Irish Folk Tune and a first movement fragment in G minor), spanning 1885 to 1917. The early quartets show the influence of Brahms, but from No. 3 in A minor (1911) a more personal voice emerges, partly through the use of Irish folk melodies and dance tunes as thematic material. There are modern recording of No. 3 by the Lindsay Quartet and of Nos. 2, 4 and 6 by the London Chamber Ensemble Quartet. The quartets were edited after the composer's death by Edward Dent and published in a collected edition by Oxford University Press in 1929.

Of the orchestral works, both the Piano Concerto (1886) and the Patrick Sarsfield Variations (1899) remained unpublished, although the Variations received a performance at the Queen's Hall Beecham Concerts in 1907. Walter Starkie said the work "shows his power of creating what may be called the Irish atmosphere in music". It has been revived in modern times by the Ulster Orchestra, conducted by Simon Joly. However, Wood appears to have lost confidence and abandoned the orchestral medium after 1905. Three symphonies and an opera remained uncompleted.

== List of works ==
Sacred works

- Magnificat and Nunc dimittis in E♭ 'no.1' (1891)
- Magnificat and Nunc Dimittis in D (1898)
- Magnificat and Nunc dimittis in C Minor (1900)
- Magnificat and Nunc dimittis in F (1908)
- Glorious and Powerful God (1910)
- Magnificat and Nunc dimittis on Tones VI, V (1910-11)
- Magnificat and Nunc dimittis in G (1911)
- Magnificat and Nunc dimittis in E (1911)
- Magnificat and Nunc dimittis in E (1913)
- Magnificat and Nunc dimittis in G (for two mixed choruses, 1915)
- Magnificat and Nunc dimittis in A♭ (1915)
- Magnificat and Nunc dimittis 'Collegium Regale' in F (1915)
- Nunc Dimittis in B♭ (English & Latin, 1916)
- Nunc Dimittis in A Minor (English & Latin, 1916)
- Magnificat and Nunc dimittis in E♭ (Sternhold and Hopkins metrical version, 1918)
- St Mark Passion (1920)
- Mass in F (1922)
- Communion Setting 'in the Phrygian Mode' (1923)
- Magnificat and Nunc dimittis on Tones IV, I (1923)
- Magnificat and Nunc dimittis founded on an old Scotch chant (pub. 1926)
- Magnificat and Nunc dimittis in A minor (pub. 1926)
- Communion Service in C Minor (pub. 1927)
- Magnificat and Nunc dimittis in C (pub. 1927)
- Magnificat and Nunc dimittis in E♭ 'no.2' (pub. 1927)
- O Thou Sweetest Source (pub. 1931)

Anthems

- Be Thou Exalted (1882)
- O Lord, Rebuke Me Not (1885)
- Praise God From Whom All Blessings Flow for SATBSATB (1886)
- O God of Hosts, the Mighty Lord for SSAATTBB (1886)
- Through the Day Thy Love has Spared Us for SATB (1886)
- O Rex gloriae for SATB (1889)
- Try Me, O God (1890)
- Precamini felicitatem (1890)
- I Will Arise (1893-4)
- Heaven (1898)
- Oculi omnium (canonic) (1904)
- Oculi omnium for SATB (1905)
- I Will Call Upon God for ATB (1905)
- Glorious and Powerful God (1910)
- Never Weather Beaten Sail (1910)
- Great Lord of Lords for ATBATB (1912)
- O Thou, the Central Orb (1914-15, setting of an 1873 poem by H.R. Bramley)
- Summer Ended (1917)
- Expectans expectavi with orchestra (1919) (setting Charles Hamilton Sorley)
- Haec dies for SSATBB (1919)
- Hail Gladdening Light for SATBSATB (1919)
- Glory and Honour and Laud for SSAATTBB (1925)
- Tis the Day of Resurrection for SATBSATB (1927)
- O most merciful (pub.1927 with 'Oculi omnium')
- How Dazzling Fair (1929)
- Father All Holy for SATBSATB (1929)
- O King Most High for SATBSATB (1932)

Cantatas

- Spring's Summons (Alfred Perceval Graves) for soprano, tenor, baritone, mixed chorus and orchestra (1885)
- Song of Welcome (Sir F. Cook) for mixed chorus, violin, harp and organ, (Royal College of Music, 1887)
- Psalm 104 for soprano, alto, tenor bass, mixed chorus, organ and orchestra (1886-7)
- Unto Thee I Will Cry for soprano, mixed chorus, organ and strings (1889)
- Ode to the West Wind, Op. 3 (P. B. Shelley) for tenor, mixed chorus and orchestra (1890)
- Music – An Ode (A. C. Swinburne) for soprano, mixed chorus and orchestra (1892-3)
- The White Island (Robert Herrick) for soprano, tenor, baritone, bass, mixed chorus and orchestra (1894)
- On Time (J. Milton) for mixed chorus and orchestra (1898)
- Dirge for Two Veterans (Walt Whitman) for baritone, mixed chorus and orchestra (1901)
- The Song of the Tempest (Walter Scott) for soprano, mixed chorus and orchestra (1903)
- A Ballad of Dundee (W. E. Aytoun) for bass, mixed chorus and orchestra (1904)
- Eden Spirits (E. B. Browning) for female voices and piano (1915?)

Stage

- A Scene from Pickwick, chamber opera in 1 act (after Charles Dickens) (1921)
- The Family Party, chamber opera in 1 act (from Ch. 4 of Martin Chuzzlewit) (1923)
- several pieces of incidental music to plays

Orchestral

- Piano Concerto in F major (1886)
- Patrick Sarsfield. Symphonic Variations on an Irish Air (1899)
- several unfinished symphonic fragments

Keyboard

- Four Characteristic Pieces in Canon, Op. 6, piano (1893)
- Variations and Fugue on 'Winchester Old', organ (1908)
- Three Preludes on Melodies from the Genevan Psalter, organ (1908)
- Sixteen Preludes on Melodies from the English and Scottish Psalters, organ (1912)
- Suite in the Ancient Style, organ (1915?)
- The Choristers' March, piano

Chamber music

- String quartets
  - No. 1 in D minor (1885)
  - No. 2 in E♭ major, "Highgate" (1892)
  - No. 3 in A minor (1911/12?)
  - No. 4 in E♭ major, "Harrogate" (1912)
  - No. 5 in F major (1914/15?)
  - No. 6 in D major (1915/16?)
  - Variations on an Irish Folk Tune (c.1917)
  - Quartet in G minor (fragment; c.1916/17)
- Septet in C minor (1889) for clarinet, bassoon, horn, violin, viola, cello, bass
- Quintet in F major (1891) for flute, oboe, clarinet, horn, bassoon
- Sonata in A major (1890s) for violin & piano
- Two Pieces (Jig, Planxty) (1923) for violin & piano
- Two Irish Dances (1927) for violin & piano

Part songs
Mixed voices (Scoring SATB unless noted)

- How Sweet the Moonlight Sleeps for SSATB (1887/8?)
- Blow, Blow thou Winter Wind (1888?)
- The Hemlock Tree (1890/1?)
- Full Fathom Five (1890/1?)
- It was a Lover (1892/3?)
- Wanderer's Night Song (1892/3)
- The Widow Bird (1895/6?)
- A Land Dirge (1898?)
- The Countryman (1898?)
- A Century's Penultimate for SSATBB (1899)
- Nights of Music (1899?)
- As the Moon's Soft Splendour (1905?)
- The Whispering Waves (1905?)
- I Call and I Call for SSATB (1905?)
- How Sweet the Tuneful Bells (1906)
- Come Sleep (1908?)
- When Whispering Strains for SSATB (1908?)
- Fain Would I Change (1908?)
- Music, When Soft Voices Die (1908?)
- Haymakers, Rakers (1908?)
- Time (1914)
- Awake, Awake (1914?)
- The Burning Babe (1920)
- Love, What Wilt Thou (1921?)
- Follow, Follow (1922?)
- Shepherd's Sunday Song (1923?)
- Spring song (1923?)
- Autumn (1924?)
- Wassail (1925?)
- Lullaby (pub. 1927)
- The Lamb (pub. 1927)
- Down in yon Summer Vale, original for male voices (pub. 1927)
- Hence Away, Begone (pub. 1929)
- The Solitary Reaper (pub. 1930)
- Rose-cheeked Laura (pub. 1931)
- When to her Lute (pub. 1933)
- Spring Time (pub. 1937)

Male voices

- It was a Lover for ATTB (1892/3?)
- It was an English Ladye Bright for baritone solo and TTBB (1899)
- Down in yon Summer Vale for TTBB (1901?)
- There Comes a New Moon for ATTB (1907/8?)
- When Winds that Move Not for ATTB (1912/13?)
- The Russian Lover for TTBB (1921/2?)
- Paty O'Toole for TTBB (1922)
- There be None of Beauty's Daughters for ATTB (1926)
- A Clear Midnight for TTBB (pub. 1926)
- When thou art Nigh for TTBB (pub. 1927)
- Neptune's Empire for TBB (pub. 1927)
- Robin Hood for TBB (pub. 1927)
- Carmen Caianum for unison men (1891/2?)

Female voices

- The Nymph's Faun for SSAA (1908?)
- Echo for SSA and piano (1908/9?)
- Cowslips for her Covering for SSAA and piano (1912/13?)
- Good Precepts for SSA and piano (1912/13?)
- Music When Soft Voices Die for SSA and piano (1914/15?)
- Sunlight All Golden for SSSS and piano (1918)
- The Starlings for SSA (1918/19?)
- Lilies for SSA (1918/19?)
- Golden Slumbers for SSSS (1919/20?)
- To Music Bent for SSA and piano or two violins (1920/1?)
- To Welcome in the Year for SSA (1923/24?)
- The Blossom for SSA (pub. 1926)
- What is a Day for SSA and piano (pub. 1927.)

Madrigals

- If Love be Dead (S.T. Coleridge) for SSATB (1886)
- Slow, Slow Fresh Fount (Ben Johnson) for SSATB (1889)
- The Bag of the Bee (Robert Herrick) for SSATB (pub. 1929)

Solo songs

- Irish Folk Songs (Alfred Perceval Graves) (1897)
- Ethiopia Saluting the Colours (Walt Whitman) (1898)
- Irish County Songs (Alfred Perceval Graves), three vols. (1914, 1927, 1928)
- Anglo-Irish Folk Songs (Padraic Gregory) vol. I (pub. 1931)
- and many more, including Irish folksong arrangements

== Discography ==
- String Quartet No. 3 in A minor, Lindsay String Quartet, ASV CD DCA879 (1993).
- The Choral and Organ Music of Charles Wood, Blackburn Cathedral Choir, David Goodenough (organ), on: Priory Records PRCD 484 (1995).
- The Anthems of Charles Wood Vol. 1, Choir of Gonville and Caius College Cambridge, Geoffrey Webber, on: Priory Records PRCD 754 (2001).
- The Anthems of Charles Wood Vol. 2, Choir of Gonville and Caius College Cambridge, Geoffrey Webber, on: Priory Records PRCD 779 (2002).
- St Mark's Passion, Choir of Jesus College Cambridge, Jonathan Vaughn (organ), on: Naxos 8.570561 (2008).
- Nunc dimittis in B-flat, Expectans expectavi, It were my soul’s desire, O Thou the central orb; Charles Wood Singers, David Hill, Philip Scriven (organ), on: Regent Records REGCD 567 (2023).
- String Quartet No. 6 in D major, London Chamber Ensemble, on: Somm Recordings SOMMCD 0692 (2024).
- Songs for Voice and Piano, Carolyn Dobbin, Roderick Williams, Iain Burnside. Delphian DCD34339 (2025)
- String Quartets Nos. 2 and 4, Variations On an Irish Folk Tune, London Chamber Ensemble, Somm Recordings SOMMCD 0692 (2026)
- String Quartets Nos. 5 and 6, Quartet Movement in G minor, Variations On an Irish Folk Tune, Bridge Quartet Heritage HTGCD 113 (2026)

== Bibliography ==
- "Charles Wood", in The Musical Times, vol. 67 (1926) no. 1002, pp. 696–697.
- Ernest Walker: "Charles Wood's String Quartet", in Monthly Musical Record, vol. 59 no. 708 (December 1929).
- Royal School of Church Music (ed.): English Church Music (Croydon, UK: Royal School of Church Music, 1963).
- Ian Copley: "Charles Wood, 1886–1926", in The Musical Times, vol. 107 (1966) no. 1480, pp. 489–492.
- Margaret Hayes Nosek: "Wood: A Personal Memoir", in The Musical Times, vol. 107 (1966) no. 1480, pp. 492–493.
- Ian Copley: The Music of Charles Wood: A Critical Study (London: Thames Publishing, 1978), ISBN 0-905210-07-7.
- Nicholas Temperley (ed.): The Athlone History of Music in Britain, vol. 5: The Romantic Age, 1800–1914 (London: The Athlone Press, 1981).
- Geoffrey Webber: "An 'English' Passion", in The Musical Times, vol. 133 (1992) no. 1790 (April), pp. 202–203.
- Jeremy Dibble: Wood, Charles, in Grove Music Online (2001)
