= Carol (music) =

Festive song, generally religious

A carol is a festive song, generally religious but not necessarily connected with Christian church worship, and sometimes accompanied by a dance. A caroller (or caroler) is someone who sings carols, and is said to be carolling (or caroling).

Today the carol is represented almost exclusively by the Advent carol, the Christmas carol, and to a lesser extent by the Easter carol; however, despite their present association with religion, this has not always been the case.

== History ==
Coventry Carol
The Coventry Carol, performed by the U.S. Army Band Chorus

The word carol is derived from the Old French word carole, a circle dance accompanied by singers (in turn derived from the Latin choraula). Carols were very popular as dance songs from the 1150s to the 1350s, after which their use expanded as processional songs sung during festivals, while others were written to accompany religious mystery plays (such as the "Coventry Carol", written before 1534).

Sacred music was traditionally sung in Latin by clergy or appointed cantors of the Catholic church. Following the Protestant Reformation, reformers aimed to bring music "back to the people". To enable the common person to sing church music, great efforts were made to translate musical texts from Latin into the native languages that people spoke. Martin Luther, the father of Lutheran Christianity, encouraged congregational singing during the Mass, in addition to spreading the practice of caroling outside the liturgy. Composers such as William Byrd composed motet-like works for Christmas that they termed carols; and folk-carols continued to be sung in rural areas. Nonetheless, some famous carols were written in this period, and they were more strongly revived from the nineteenth century and began to be written and adapted by eminent composers.

== Modern carols ==
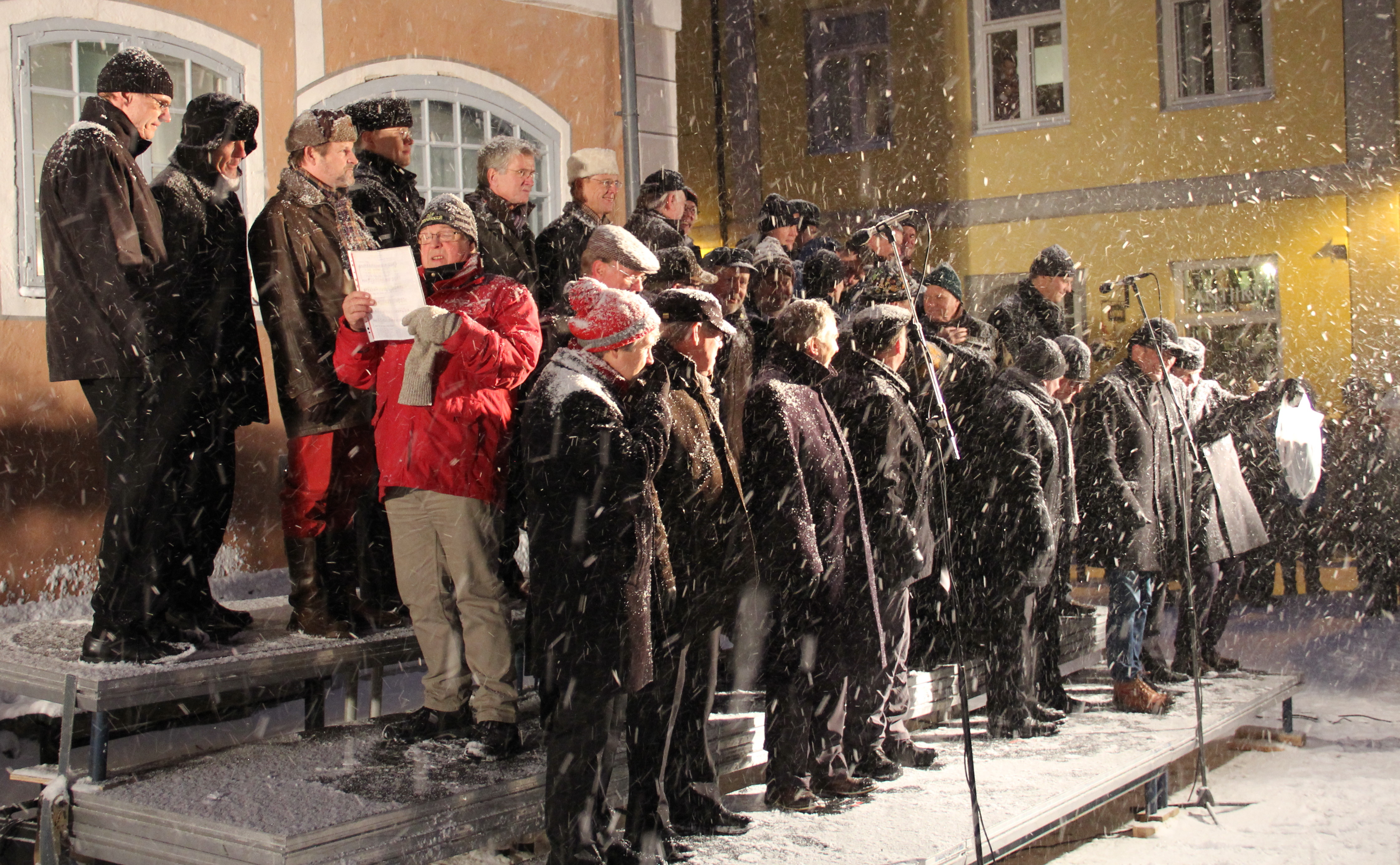
Singing carols during the 2014 Declaration of Christmas Peace in Porvoo, Finland

In modern times, songs that may once have been regarded as carols are now no longer classified as such (especially Christmas songs), even those that retain the traditional attributes of a carol – celebrating a seasonal topic, alternating verses and chorus, and danceable music.

Some writers of carols, such as George Ratcliffe Woodward who wrote "Ding Dong Merrily on High" and William Morris who wrote "Masters in This Hall", reverted to a quasi-mediaeval style; this became a feature of the early twentieth-century revival in Christmas Carols.

Some composers have written extended works based on carols. Examples include Benjamin Britten (A Ceremony of Carols), Ralph Vaughan Williams (Fantasia on Christmas Carols) and Victor Hely-Hutchinson (Carol Symphony).

== Bibliography ==
Important anthologies of carols include:

- The Carol Book ed. David Iliff and John Barnard, published RSCM (2005)
- Carols for Choirs ed. David Willcocks, Reginald Jacques and John Rutter (1961–1988)
- Christmas Carols New and Old ed. H. R. Bramley and John Stainer (1871)
- The Cowley Carol Book ed. George Ratcliffe Woodward (1901–19)
- The New Oxford Book of Carols ed. Hugh Keyte and Andrew Parrott (1992)
- The Oxford Book of Carols ed. Percy Dearmer, Martin Shaw and Ralph Vaughan Williams (1928)
- The Penguin Book of Carols ed. Ian Bradley (1999)
- The University Carol Book ed. Erik Routley (1961)

== See also ==
- Cancionero de Upsala
- Carols by Candlelight
- List of Christmas carols
- Kolyadka, Koledari
- Medieval dance
- Piae Cantiones
- Trick-or-treating
- Villancico
- Wassailing
