= List of Christmas carols =

This list of Christmas carols is organized by language of origin. Originally, a Christmas carol referred to a piece of vocal music in carol form whose lyrics centre on the theme of Christmas or the Christmas season. The difference between a Christmas carol and a popular Christmas song can often be unclear as they are both sung by groups of people going house to house during the Christmas season. Some view Christmas carols to be only religious in nature and consider Christmas songs to be secular.

Many traditional Christmas carols focus on the Christian celebration of the birth of Jesus, while others celebrate the Twelve Days of Christmas that range from 25 December to 5 January, or Christmastide which ranges from 24 December to 5 January. As a result, many Christmas carols can be related to Saint Stephen's Day celebrated on 26 December in Western Christianity and 27 December in Eastern Christianity, St John's Day (27 December in Western Christianity) and 7 January in Eastern Christianity, Feast of Holy Innocents (28 December), Saint Sylvester's Day (31 December), and the Epiphany. Examples of this are "We Three Kings" (an Epiphany song), and "Good King Wenceslas" (a carol for Saint Stephen's Day). Nonetheless, some other categories of Christmas music, both religious and secular, have become associated with the Christmas season even though the lyrics may not specifically refer to Christmas – for example, "Deck the Halls" (no religious references) and "O Come, O Come, Emmanuel" (an Advent chant). Other Christmas music sung by carolers focuses on more secular Christmas themes, and winter carols and novelty Christmas songs often refer to winter scenes, family gatherings, and Santa Claus ("Jingle Bells", "O Christmas Tree", "Home for the Holidays", "Jolly Old Saint Nicholas", "Frosty the Snowman", "Santa Claus Is Comin' to Town", etc.).

== Afrikaans ==
| Title | Composer / lyricist | Year | Notes |
|---|---|---|---|
| "Somerkersfees" | Koos du Plessis | | Title translation: "Summer Christmas" |

== Arabic ==
| Title | Composer / lyricist | Year published | Notes |
|---|---|---|---|
| "Laylat Al-Milad" | Traditional Maronite Hymn | | Title translation: "Christmas Eve" |

== Basque ==
| Title | Composer / lyricist | Year published | Notes |
|---|---|---|---|
| "Birjina maite" ("Lovely virgin") | Traditional | 19th century / early 20th century | |
| "Hator hator" ("Come come") | Antonio and Juan Kruz De la Fuente | 18th century | |
| "Mari Domingi" | Resurreccion Maria Azkue | 20th century | Carol about Mari Domingi, a prominent character in Basque Christmas tradition. |
| "Mesias sarritan" ("Messiah often") | Bartolome Ertzilla | 1892 | Also known as "Belengo portalian" ("In the stable at Bethlehem") |
| "Oi Bethleem" ("Oh Bethlehem") | Jose Gontzalo Zulaika | Early 20th century | |
| "Olentzero joan zaigu" ("Olentzero has left us") | Traditional | | Carol about Olentzero, the most important character in Basque Christmas tradition, similar to Santa Claus in other countries. |

== Catalan ==
| Title | Composer / lyricist | Year published | Notes |
|---|---|---|---|
| "Fum, Fum, Fum" ("El vint-i-cinc de desembre") | Traditional | 16th century | The word "fum" may imitate the sound of a drum (or perhaps the strumming of a guitar). "Fum" means "smoke"(noun) in Catalan. |
| "El cant dels ocells" (lit. "Song of the Birds") | Traditional; Pablo Casals arranged the song for cello | Lyrics are printed in 17th century | also known as "Carol of Birds" |
| "El Noi de la Mare" (lit. "The Son of the Mother") | Traditional | 17th-18th century | Also known as "Carol of the Gifts" |
| "A Betlem me'n vull anar" (lit. "I want to go to Bethlehem") | Traditional | | |
| "El dimoni escuat" (lit. "the devil with no tail") | Traditional | | |
| "Ara ve Nadal" (lit. "Christmas is coming") | Traditional | | |
| "Les dotze van tocant" (lit. "Ringing twelve o'clock") | Traditional | | |
| "Descanseu ben alegres" (lit. "Rest very happy") | Traditional | | |
| "Pastorets de la muntanya" (lit. "Shepherds from the mountain") | Traditional | | |
| "El desembre congelat" (lit. "Frozen December") | Traditional | | |
| "Sant Josep i la Mare de Déu" (lit. "Saint Joseph and the Mother of God") | Traditional | | |
| "La pastora Caterina" (lit. "Caterina, the shepherd") | Traditional | | |
| "Anem a Betlem" (lit. "We're going to Bethlehem") | Traditional | | |
| "El rabadà" (lit. "The shepherd") | Traditional | | |
| Caga Tío” | Traditional | | A song sung when beating Tio de Nadal. |

== Cebuano ==
| Title | Composer / lyricist | Year published | Notes |
|---|---|---|---|
| "Kasadya Ning Taknaa" (lit. "How Merry is This Hour") | Vicente Rubi / Mariano Vestil | 1933 | More popularly known by its loose translation in Tagalog as "Ang Pasko ay Sumapit" (lit. "Christmas Has Come"). |

== Chinese ==
The English titles are taken from the Hymns of Universal Praise and the Chinese New Hymnal.

| Title | Composer / lyricist | Year published | Notes |
|---|---|---|---|
| 聖誕歌 Shèngdàn Gē (The Moon and Stars of Christmas Eve) | Bliss Wiant (Chinese name: 范天祥 Fàn Tiānxiáng) / 田景福 (Tián Jǐngfú) | 1934 / 1933 | Title from the Hymns of Universal Praise. Also called "一輪明月歌" Yīlún Míngyuè Gē by its first line in the Chinese New Hymnal. |
| 明星燦爛歌 Míngxīng Cànlàn Gē (Midnight, Sleeping Bethlehem) | 梁季芳 (Liáng Jìfāng) / 楊鏡秋 (Yáng Jìngqiū) | 1934 / 1930 | |
| 聖夜靜歌 Shèngyè Jìng Gē (Crystal Night, Stilly Night)(odd night) | 史奇珪 (Shǐ Qíguī) / 朱味腴 (Zhū Wèiyú) and 吳敬人 (Wú Jìngrén) | 1982 / 1921 | |
| 聖誕感恩歌 Shèngdàn Gǎn'ēn Gē (Jesus Our Saviour, Word Incarnate) | 林聲本 (Lín Shēngběn) / 任大齡 (Rén Dàlíng) | 1981 | |
| 歡樂佳音歌 Huānlè Jiāyīn Gē (Shout the Glad Tidings) | Chinese traditional melody / Anonymous | 20th century | The version in the Chinese New Hymnal is revised from the Chinese Hymnary (頌主聖歌). |
| 聖誕敘事 Shèngdàn Xùshì (Idyll of Christmas) | 段毓貞 (Duàn Yùzhēn) | 1954 | |
| 拜謁聖嬰 Bàiyè Shèngyīng (Worship the Holy Infant) | 史奇珪 / 徐曉鴻 (Xú Xiǎohóng) | 2007 / 2004 | |
| 馬槽耶穌 Mǎcáo Yēsū (Jesus in the Manger) | 史奇珪 | 1952, revised 2009 | |
| 佳音歌 Jiāyīn Gē (Song of Good Tidings) | 吳安娜 (Wú Ānnà) / 王賢軍 (Wáng Xiánjūn) | 1999 | |

== Croatian ==
| Carol | Composer / lyricist | Year published | Notes |
|---|---|---|---|
| "U to vrijeme godišta" ("At that time of the year") | Traditional | 12th century | |
| "Svim na Zemlji, mir, veselje" ("All on Earth, peace, joy") | Franjo Langer/Adam Alojzij Baričević | 18th century | |
| "Radujte se narodi" ("Nations rejoice") | Franjo Langer/Adam Alojzij Baričević | 18th century | |
| "Narodi nam se" ("Born unto us") | Traditional | 13th century | |
| "Tri kralja jahahu" ("Three kings were riding") | Traditional | 1912. | From Istria |
| "Veselje ti navješćujem" ("Joy I preach you") | Franjo Langer/Adam Alojzij Baričević | 18th century | |
| "O Betleme" ("Oh, Betlehem") | Franjo Langer/Adam Alojzij Baričević | 18th century | |
| "Oj, pastiri" ("Oy, shepherds") | Traditional | | |
| "Djetešce nam se rodilo" ("A child was born unto us") | Traditional | | |
| "Veseli se Majko Božja" ("Rejoice, Mother of God") | Vladoje Bersa | 1906. | From Knin |

== Czech ==
| Title | Composer / lyricist | Year published | Notes |
|---|---|---|---|
| "Nesem vám noviny" ("We bring you the tidings!") | traditional from Bohemia | | "Come, All Ye Shepherds" (Mari Ruef Hofer, 1912); German: "Kommet, ihr Hirten" (Carl Riedel, ca. 1870) |
| "Půjdem spolu do Betléma" ("Let's all go to Bethlehem.") | traditional from Bohemia | | |
| "Štědrý večer nastal" ("Christmas Eve has come.") | traditional from Bohemia | | |
| "Pásli ovce valaši" ("The Wallachians were grazing their sheep.") | traditional from Moravia | | |
| "Narodil se Kristus pán" ("Christ the Lord was born") | traditional from Bohemia | 1505 | |
| "Den přeslavný jest k nám přišel" ("The glorious day has arrived") | traditional from Bohemia | | |
| "Jak si krásné neviňátko" ("How fair are you, oh youngling") | traditional from Bohemia | | |
| "Zither Carol" | Czech folk tune – Sedlák, sedlák | 1958 | English lyrics by Malcolm Sargent, set to a traditional tune. "Girls and boys, leave your toys..." |

== Danish ==
The list is based primarily on carols and hymns mentioned in the Folkehøjskolens Sangbog (Folk High School Songbook).

Where possible, a carol title is linked to its (Danish) Wikipedia entry, where the carol can be heard. Otherwise, a carol title has been linked to its entry at the Danish Hymn Book Online.

| Carol | Composer/Lyricist | Year published | Notes |
|---|---|---|---|
| "Blomstre som en rosengård" | Johann Hartmann / N. F. S. Grundtvig | 1861 / 1837, 1853 | Advent |
| "Dejlig er den himmel blå" | J. G. Meidell / N. F. S. Grundtvig | ca. 1840 / 1853, 1864 | Epiphany |
| "Dejlig er jorden" | Silesian tune / Bernhard Severin Ingemann | 18th century / 1850 | |
| "Den yndigste rose er funden" | Joseph Klug / Hans Adolph Brorson | 1542 / 1732 | |
| "Det første lys er Ordet talt af Gud" | Bjarne Haahr / Johannes Johansen | 1978 / 1974 | Advent |
| "Det kimer nu til julefest" | Carl Christian Nicolaj Balle / N. F. S. Grundtvig | 1850 / 1817, 1837 | |
| "En rose så jeg skyde" | Cöln / trans. from Michael Praetorius by Thomas Laub | 1599 / 1609 trans.1920 | "Es ist ein Ros entsprungen" |
| "En sød og liflig klang" | Trier, Joseph Klug / German trans., Martin Luther, Hans Thomissøn, N. F. S. Grundtvig | 1482, 1533 / 14th century, 1529 and 1545, 1569, 1837 | |
| "Puer natus in Bethlehem" | German tune / N. F. S. Grundtvig | c. 1600 / 1820 | Based on a medieval Latin hymn "Puer natus in Bethlehem", publ. in Danish in the hymn books of Hans Tausen (1553) and Hans Thomissøn (1569). A children's favourite. |
| "Et lidet barn så lysteligt" | Carl Christian Nicolaj Balle / N. F. S. Grundtvig | 1855 / 1843 | |
| "Hjerte, løft din glædes vinger" | Johann Crüger / Paul Gerhardt, trans. C. J. Brandt | 1653 / 1653, trans. 1878 | |
| "I denne søde juletid" | Carl Christian Nicolaj Balle / Hans Adolph Brorson | 1855 / 1732, 1739 | |
| "Ind under jul" | Morten Eskesen / Jonas Lie | 1876 / 1865 | |
| "Julebudet til dem, der bygge" | Johann Hartmann / Jens Christian Hostrup | 1890 / 1881,1884 | |
| "Julen har bragt velsignet bud" | Christoph Ernst Friedrich Weyse / Bernhard Severin Ingemann | 1841 / 1839 | |
| "Julen har englelyd" | Andreas Peter Berggreen / N. F. S. Grundtvig | 1852 / 1845, 1851 | |
| "Kimer, I klokker" | Henrik Rung / N. F. S. Grundtvig | 1857 / 1856 | |
| "Resonet in laudibus" | Pre-Reformation tune / N. F. S. Grundtvig and Thomas Laub | Pre-Reformation / 1837, 1873 and 1890 | |
| "Mit hjerte altid vanker" | Carl Nielsen / Hans Adolph Brorson | 1919 / 1732 | |
| "Lille Guds barn, hvad skader dig?" | Traditional / N. F. S. Grundtvig | / 1870 | Advent |
| "Velkommen igen, Guds engle små" | Andreas Peter Berggreen alt. Christoph Ernst Friedrich Weyse / N. F. S. Grundtvig | 1834 alt. 1836 / 1825, 1850 | Lyrics written the night before Christmas Day |
| "Vær velkommen, Herrens år" | Andreas Peter Berggreen / N. F. S. Grundtvig from a medieval Danish Advent hymn | 1852 / 1849, 1852 | Advent, Epiphany |

== Dutch ==
| Title | Composer / lyricist | Year published | Notes |
|---|---|---|---|
| "Nu zijt wellekome" | Traditional melody | Probably 15th century | First found in Begijnhof Manuscript (ca. 1600) |
| "In dulci jubilo" | | 15th century | First found in Utrecht Sint-Agnes Manuscript |
| "Een kind geboren in Bethlehem" | Dutch traditional | 15th century | Oldest find: Deventer Song Manuscript |
| "O, Kindeke klein, o, Kindeke teer" | | 1508 | First published in Dit is een suverlijc boecxken |
| "Het was een maged uitverkoren" | Dutch traditional | 1508 | First published in D. Coelde van Munster: "Dit is een suverlijc boecxken" |
| "Herders, hij is geboren" | Dutch traditional | 1645 | First published in "Den blijden wegh tot Bethleem" |
| "Hoe leit dit kindeke" | Dutch traditional | ca. 1650 | First published in Wilhelm Schepping, Die Wettener Liederhandschrift (Song Manuscript) |
| "Eer zij God in onze/deze dagen" a.k.a. "Engelkens, door het luchtruim zwevend" | Attributed to F.A. Schultz, who translated the ancient Latin carol "Gloria in excelsis Deo" into German | 1857, possible previous publication ca. 1730 | translation of "Gloria in excelsis Deo" into Dutch by Isaac Bikkers (often confused with "Ere zij God") |
| "De herdertjes lagen bij nachte" | Dutch traditional | 1852 | First print in J. en L. Alberdingk Thijm, 'Oude en Nieuwere Kerst-Liederen' |
| "Maria die zoude naar Betlehem gaan" | Dutch traditional | 1852 | First printed in J. Alberdingk Thijm, Oude en Nieuwere Kerst-Liederen |
| "Ere zij God" | Dutch original (often confused with "Eer zij God in onze/deze dagen") | 1857 | First print in Isaac Bikkers, Het nachtegaaltje, rendered into English as "Glory to God" |
| "Er is een kindeke geboren op aard" | Dutch traditional | 1879 | First published in Lootens en Feys, Chants populaires flamands |
| "Geen wiegje als rustplaats" | translation of "Away in a manger" | | |
| "Kling/Luidt, klokje/-s, klingelingeling" | Dutch traditional | | |
| "Komt allen tezamen" | | | From Latin hymn "Adeste Fideles" |
| "'t Is geboren het Goddelijk Kind" | | | From French noël |
| "Midden in de winternacht" | | 1943 | Dutch text: Harry Prenen, melody: old Catalan carol "El desembre congelat" |

== English ==
| Title | Composer / lyricist | Year | Notes |
|---|---|---|---|
| "Adam lay ybounden" | Set by numerous composers, most notably by Boris Ord and Peter Warlock | 15th century | |
| "A Christmas Carol" | words and music: Charles Ives | 1897 | |
| "A Great and Mighty Wonder" | lyrics: The words of St Germanus were translated by John Mason Neale (1818–1866) tune: Michael Praetorius (1571–1621) written originally to the lyrics of "Lo, How a Rose E'er Blooming". | 1599 | |
| "Angels from the Realms of Glory" | lyrics: James Montgomery; music: Henry Thomas Smart, 1867, to the tune of "Regent Square". In the UK a slightly different arrangement of "Angels We Have Heard on High" ("Gloria") | 1816 | |
| "Angels We Have Heard on High" | based on traditional hymn "Gloria" (a French traditional carol "Les Anges dans nos Campagnes"); English translation by Bishop James Chadwick, tune arranged by Edward Shippen Barnes | 1862 | |
| "As with Gladness Men of Old" | William Chatterton Dix | 1867 | Set to same tune as "For the Beauty of the Earth" |
| "Away in a Manger" | First two stanzas unknown, often erroneously attributed to Martin Luther; third stanza written by John McFarland (1904) | 1882 | More than 40 settings are known. Most popular US version is by James R. Murray (1887); The most popular UK version is by another American, William J. Kirkpatrick (1895) |
| "The Babe in Bethlem's Manger" | Kentish traditional | | |
| "Beautiful Star of Bethlehem" | Robert Fisher Boyce | 1940 | |
| "Benedicamus Domino" | lyrics: Rev. C. L. Hutchins | 1916 | Several settings, including Ben Emberley (2022) |
| "Bethlehem Down" | Peter Warlock (composer); Bruce Blunt (poet) | 1927 | Mostly used in Christmas and Epiphany services of the Anglican church |
| "Boar's Head Carol" | English traditional | 15th century | |
| "Brightest and Best" ("Star of the East") | written by Reginald Heber | 1811 | Not to be confused with the American "Star of the East" |
| "Calypso Carol" ("See him lying on a bed of straw") | Michael Perry | 1969 | Written in 1964 for a college concert |
| "Candlelight Carol" | John Rutter | 1984 | |
| "Carol of the Bells" | Mykola Leontoyvch, Peter J. Wilhousky | 1904 | The song is based on a folk chant known in Ukrainian as "Shchedryk". |
| "The Cherry-Tree Carol" | English traditional | | |
| "Children, Go Where I Send Thee" | traditional African American spiritual | | |
| "Chrissy the Christmas Mouse" | Written by Louis S. Filardi | 1992 | |
| "Christians, awake, salute the happy morn" | John Byrom, music by John Wainwright | c. 1750 | Based on a poem of three 16 line stanzas, originally for the author's daughter, which was later reworked into singable verses. |
| "Christmas for Cowboys" | Steve Weisberg | 1975 | |
| "Christmas Saves The Year " | Twenty One Pilots | 2021 | |
| "Christmas Song" ("Chestnuts Roasting On An Open Fire") ("Merry Christmas to You") | Robert Wells and Mel Tormé | 1945 | |
| "Come and I will sing you" | English traditional | Early 19th century or before | Musicologist Cecil Sharp, influential in the folklore revival in England, noted in his 1916 One Hundred English Folksongs that the words are "so corrupt, indeed, that in some cases we can do little more than guess at their original meaning" |
| "Come, Thou Long Expected Jesus" | Charles Wesley | 1749 | Set to Hyfrydol |
| "Coventry Carol" ("Lullay, Thou Tiny Little Child") | English traditional | | |
| "December in the North" | | | |
| "Ding Dong Merrily on High" | music: Jehan Tabourot, words: George Ratcliffe Woodward | 1924 | Tune originally entitled "Branle de l'Official". |
| "Down in Yon Forest" | English traditional | | The "Corpus Christi Carol" |
| "Do You Hear What I Hear?" | written by Noël Regney and Gloria Shayne Baker | 1962 | |
| "Dominick the Donkey" | written by Ray Allen, Sam Saltzberg and Wandra Merrell | 1960 | |
| "Far, Far Away on Judea's Plains" | words and music: John Menzies Macfarlane | 1869 | |
| "The First Noel" ("The First Nowell") | English traditional | 1823 | First published in Carols Ancient and Modern by William Sandys |
| "The Friendly Beasts" | French Traditional | 12th century | English by Robert Davis 1934 |
| "Gabriel's Message" | translated into English by Sabine Baring-Gould | | from the Basque traditional carol "Birjina gaztettobat zegoen" |
| "Gloucestershire Wassail" | English Traditional | 18th century or earlier | Numerous publications of the present-day music were published in the 1800s along with variations of lyrics. It is known to have been sung at least as far back as the late 1700s. |
| "Go Tell It on the Mountain" | African American spiritual dating at least to 1865 Lyrics by John W. Work | 1865 | |
| "Good King Wenceslas" | English traditional | 1853 | John Mason Neale, Thomas Helmore |
| "God Rest Ye Merry, Gentlemen" | English traditional | c. 1760 | Published by William Sandys; author unknown |
| "Good Christian Men, Rejoice" | Heinrich Seuse | 1328 | English lyrics fitted to the Latin hymn-tune "In dulci jubilo"; also known as "Good Christian Friends, Rejoice" |
| "Hark! The Herald Angels Sing" | *music: Felix Mendelssohn, words: Charles Wesley, amended by George Whitefield and Martin Madan | 1739 | originally as part of Festgesang, adapted and harmonised by William Hayman Cummings; descant for verse 3 added in 1961 by Sir David Willcocks for the Carols for Choirs books |
| Hellesveor | Cornish Carol. Music by Colan Williams. Words: from the AV Bible | 19th century | Hellesveor is the name of a village and Methodist chapel near St Ives. |
| "Here We Come A-wassailing" | English traditional | c. "1850" | |
| "The Holly and the Ivy" | English traditional | | |
| Huron Carol ("Jesous Ahatonhia") | Jean de Brébeuf | 1643 | "Jesus, he is born". Also known as "Twas in the Moon of Wintertime" after English translation (1926) by Jesse Edgar Middleton. |
| "I Heard the Bells on Christmas Day" | words: Henry Wadsworth Longfellow | 1863 | Several settings of music have been popular: Joseph Mainzer (1845) John Baptiste Calkin (1872) Johnny Marks (1956) |
| "I Saw Three Ships (Come Sailing In)" | English traditional | 1833 | Published by William Sandys. |
| "In the Bleak Midwinter" | words: Christina Rossetti, music: versions by Gustav Holst and Harold Darke | | |
| "Infant Holy, Infant Lowly" ("W żłobie leży") | Polish traditional | | |
| "It Came Upon the Midnight Clear" | words: Edmund Hamilton Sears | 1849 | music (US): "Carol" Richard Storrs Willis music (UK): "Noel", melody arranged and adapted by Arthur Sullivan |
| "Jesus Christ the Apple Tree" | Elizabeth Poston | | |
| "Jingle Bells" | James Lord Pierpont | 1857 | Originally titled "One Horse Open Sleigh"; and written for a school Thanksgiving pageant. |
| "Joy to the World" | words: Isaac Watts based on Psalm 98, music: arranged by Lowell Mason based on themes in Handel's Messiah | 1719 | |
| "Judea" | music: William Billings | | |
| "Little Donkey" | written by Eric Boswell | 1959 | |
| "The Little Drummer Boy" ("Carol of the Drum") | written by Katherine K. Davis, Harry Simeone, Henry Onorati | 1941 | |
| "Love Came Down at Christmas" | words: Christina Rossetti, music: various | 1885 | |
| "The Lord at first did Adam make" | words: West Country traditional | | |
| "Mary, Did You Know?" | written by Mark Lowry and Buddy Greene | 1991 | |
| "Mary's Boy Child" | Jester Hairston | 1956 | |
| "Masters in This Hall" | written by William Morris | c. 1860 | |
| "Night of Silence" | words and music: Daniel Kantor | 1981 | written to be sung simultaneously with "Silent Night" |
| "O Come, All Ye Faithful" (Adeste Fideles) | 17th century carol. English translation by Frederick Oakeley in 1841. | | |
| "O Holy Night" | words: Placide Cappeau de Rouquemaure, translated by John Sullivan Dwight, music: Adolphe Adam | 1847 | |
| "O Little Town of Bethlehem" | words: Phillips Brooks | 1867 | Music (US): Lewis H. Redner, music (UK): traditional tune: "Forest Green" (a.k.a. "The Ploughboy's Dream") |
| "Of the Father's Heart Begotten" ("Of the Father's Love Begotten") | music: tune from Piae Cantiones | | |
| "Once in Royal David's City" | Words: Cecil Frances Humphreys Alexander; Music: Henry John Gauntlett (Irby) | 1849 | |
| "Past Three O'Clock" (or "Past Three a Clock") | English traditional, with verses written by George Ratcliffe Woodward | | First published in The Cowley Carol Book with a harmonisation by Charles Wood |
| "Rise Up Shepherd and Foller" | African American spiritual | 19th century | Also known as "Rise Up Shepherd and Follow" |
| "The Rocking Carol" | Loose translation of Czech traditional carol "Hajej, nynej, Ježíšku" by Percy Dearmer | 1928 | First published in the Oxford Book of Carols (1928) |
| "Rudolph the Red-Nosed Reindeer" | Johnny Marks | 1949 | |
| "Sans Day Carol" | Cornish traditional | | |
| "See, amid the Winter's Snow" | Words: Edward Caswall; Music: John Goss | | |
| "The Seven Joys of Mary" | English traditional | | |
| "Shepherds Arise" | anon., Dorset | 19th century | Published 1926 by W. A. Pickard-Cambridge |
| "Silver Bells" | Jay Livingston and Ray Evans | 1950 | |
| "Sir Christèmas" | Composed by Rev. Richard Smart | 15th century | |
| "Sleep, Baby, Sleep" | words: John Addington Symonds | 1885 | Setting by Ben Emberley (2023) |
| "Snoopy's Christmas" | Written by George David Weiss, Hugo & Luigi | 1967 | |
| "Star of the East" | Written by Alfred Hans Zoller; Translation by George Cooper in 1890; Music by Amanda Kennedy in 1883 | 1890 | Not to be confused with the English carol titled "Star of the East" or "Brightest and Best" |
| "Sussex Carol" ("On Christmas Night All Christians Sing") | English traditional | | |
| "Sweet Little Jesus Boy" | Robert MacGimsey | 1934 | Imitates the African American spiritual-style. |
| "The Apple White Carol (Christmas Be The Fairest)" | Written by David Lawrence | 2025 | Inspired by Ever After High, a fashion doll line by Mattel. The carol centers on the character Apple White, the daughter of Snow White, whose wish is to make Christmas "the fairest of them all". |
| "The Chipmunk Song (Christmas Don't Be Late)" | Written by Ross Bagdasarian | 1958 | Bagdasarian sang the Christmas carol, varying the tape speeds to produce high-pitched "chipmunk" voices, with the vocals credited to Alvin and the Chipmunks, Seville's cartoon virtual band and later media franchise. |
| "This Endris Night" | Traditional | 15th century | |
| "The Twelve Days of Christmas" | Traditional with additions by Frederic Austin | c. 1780 | |
| "There Is No Rose" | 15th century | | Numerous modern settings, by Benjamin Britten, John Joubert, Cheryl Frances-Hoad, et al. |
| "Torches" | Composed by John Joubert | 1951 | |
| "Unto Us a Boy is Born" ("Unto Us is Born a Son") | English traditional | | |
| "A Virgin Unspotted" ("A Virgin Most Pure") | English traditional | | |
| "We Three Kings of Orient Are" ("Three Kings of Orient") | Written by Rev. John Henry Hopkins | 1863 | An Epiphany carol |
| "What Child Is This?" | Music: traditional English song "Greensleeves"; Words: William Chatterton Dix | 1865 | |
| "Whence Is That Lovely Fragrance Wafting" ("Whence Is That Goodly Fragrance Flowing?") ("Quelle est cette odeur agréable?") | French traditional | | |
| "While by My Sheep I Watched at Night" | | | |
| "While shepherds watched their flocks" | Words: Nahum Tate; Music (UK): "Winchester Old" from Este's Psalter adapted from Christopher Tye; Music (US): adapted from Handel, 1728; arranged in Harmonia Sacra, 1812. | 1700 | |
| "With Wondering Awe", the Wisemen Saw... | Music and verse: Anon | | |
| "Wolcum Yole" | Written by Benjamin Britten | | From "A Ceremony of Carols" |
| "Zither Carol" | | | |

== Estonian ==
| Title | Composer / lyricist | Year published | Notes |
|---|---|---|---|
| "Kelgusõit" ("Sled Ride") | based on a 1905 poem by Reinhold Kamsen. | 1913 | Based on a Ukrainian folk tune. |
| "Läbi lume sahiseva" ("Through the Rustling Snow") | words by Juhan Aavik, melody by J. Janson. | 1924 | Based on an Estonian folk tune. |
| "Tiliseb, tiliseb aisakell" ("Tinkling, Tinkling Sleigh Bell") | words by Leonhard (Leo) Virkhaus, melody by Julius Oengo (J. Oro). | 1934 | The song has spread to over 70 countries, making it the most spread Estonian Christmas carol. |

== Filipino ==
| Title | Composer / lyricist | Year published | Notes |
|---|---|---|---|
| "Ang Pasko ay Sumapit" (Christmas Has Come) | Tagalog lyrics by Levi Celerio: adapted from Cebuano lyrics by Vicente Rubi, Mariano Vestil | 1933 | A loose translation of the original Cebuano Kasadya ni'ng Táknaa |

== Finnish ==
| Title | Composer / lyricist | Year published | Notes |
|---|---|---|---|
| "En etsi valtaa, loistoa" ("Give Me No Splendour, Gold, or Pomp") | words by Zachris Topelius (1887; Finnish translation by Martti Korpilahti, 1909); music by Jean Sibelius (1909) | | Translated from Finland Swedish "Giv mig ej glans, ej guld, ej prakt" |
| "Joulun kellot" ("Christmas Bells") | words by Helmi Auvinen (1897); music by Armas Maasalo (1914) | | |
| "Joulupuu on rakennettu" ("Christmas tree has been built") | words by Gustaf Oskar Schöneman; music Finnish folk melody | 1876 | |
| "Tonttu" | words by Viktor Rydberg; Finnish translation by Valter Juva; music by Lyyli Wartiovaara-Kallioniemi | | |
| "On hanget korkeat, nietokset " | words by Ilkku Joukahainen; music by Jean Sibelius | | |
| "Varpunen jouluaamuna" (Sparrow on Christmas Morning) | words (Swedish) by Zachris Topelius (1859); Finnish translation by Konrad Alexis Hougberg; music by Otto Kotilainen (1913) | | |
| "Sylvian joululaulu" (Sylvia's Christmas song) | words by Zachris Topelius; music by Karl Collan | | translated from Finland Swedish "Sylvias hälsning från Sicilien" |

== French ==
| Title | Composer / lyricist | Year published | Notes |
|---|---|---|---|
| "Les Anges dans nos campagnes" | | | Translated into English as "Angels We Have Heard on High" |
| "Çà, bergers, assemblons-nous" | | music 15th/16th century; published 1701 with words by Simon-Joseph Pellegrin | Title translation: "Here, shepherds, let us gather". Adapted from "Où s'en vont ces gais bergers". |
| "Cantate de Noël" / "Pour sauver l'humanité" | lyrics: Gustave Gaillardon; music: Louis-Claude d'Aquin | early 20th century (lyrics), c. 1757 (music) | Set to the melody of d'Aquin's 10th Noël; musical score at archive.org |
| "C'est Noël" | lyrics: Jean Manse; music: Henri Betti | 1956 | Song written for the movie Honoré de Marseille with Fernandel |
| "Dans cette étable" | | words 19th century | Title translation: "In this stable". It is sung to the same music as "Es ist ein Ros entsprungen" |
| "D'où viens-tu, bergère?" | Traditional French | | Title translation "Where are you coming from, shepherdess?" |
| "Entre le bœuf et l'âne gris" | | 13th or 16th century | Title translation: "Between the ox and the grey donkey" |
| "Il est né, le divin Enfant" | Traditional French | c. 1875 | Translated into English as "He Is Born, the Divine Christ Child" |
| "La Marche Des Rois Mages" | | 13th century traditional | Translated into English as "March of the Kings" or "Sing Noel: A Christmas Fanfare" with words by Jay Althouse |
| "Minuit, Chrétiens" ("Cantique de Noël") | lyrics: Placide Cappeau, music: Adolphe Adam | 1843 (lyrics), 1847 (music) | Translated into English as "O Holy Night" |
| "Noel Bourguignon" ("Burgundian Carol") | Bernard de La Monnoye | c. 1700 | Translated into English by Oscar Brand |
| "Noël nouvelet" | | 15th century | Translated into English as "Sing We Now of Christmas" |
| "Patapan" ("Guillô, pran ton tamborin!") | Bernard de La Monnoye | | Title translation: Willy, take your tambourine |
| "Petit Papa Noël" | lyrics: Raymond Vincy; music: Henri Martinet | 1946 | |
| "Quelle est cette odeur agréable?" | | | Translated into English as "Whence Is That Goodly Fragrance Flowing?" |
| "Trois Anges (sont venus ce soir") | Traditional French | | Title translation : "Three Angels have come tonight" |
| "Un flambeau, Jeannette, Isabelle" | | 1553 | Translated into English as "Bring a Torch, Jeanette, Isabella" |
| "Venez divin Messie" | | music 16th century; published 18th century with words by Simon-Joseph Pellegrin | Translated in English as "O Come, Divine Messiah". |

== Galician ==
| Title | Composer / lyricist | Year published | Notes |
|---|---|---|---|
| "Da Ulla a meu cabo veño" | Melchor López | 1790 | |
| "En Belén hai moita festa" | José Pacheco | 1829 | |
| "Nadal De Luíntra" ("Luintra Carol") | Traditional | | |
| "Null'ome per ren non-deve" | Alfonso X of Castile | 13th century | One of the Cantigas de Santa Maria (CSM 50) |
| "Pois que dos reys Nostro Sennor" (Since Our Lord chose to descend from the lineage of kings) | Alfonso X of Castile | 13th century | One of the Cantigas de Santa Maria (CSM 424). It is the oldest Iberian Christmas carol written in a vernacular language |

== German ==
| Title | Composer / lyricist | Year published | Notes |
|---|---|---|---|
| "Alle Jahre wieder" ("Every Year Again") | Friedrich Silcher /Wilhelm Hey | 1837 | |
| "Am Weihnachtsbaum die Lichter brennen" ("On the Christmas tree the lights burn") | traditional /Hermann Kletke | 1841 | Translated into English as "Light the Christmas tree candles" |
| "Auf, Christen, singt festliche Lieder" ("O Christians, sing festive songs") | August Erthel / in Fulda | 1778 | Translated into English as "O Christians, Come Join in the Singing" |
| "Die Könige" (The Kings) | Peter Cornelius | 1856 & 1870 (rewrote) | Translated into English as "The Three Kings" or "Three Kings From Persian Lands Afar" by W. G. Rothery in 1916 |
| "Der Morgenstern ist aufgedrungen" (The morning star is risen) | Daniel Rumpius / Michael Praetorius | 1587 | |
| "Es hat sich halt eröffnet" ("It just opened") | Anonymous | 18th century | from Tyrol, Styria and Swabia |
| "Es ist ein Ros entsprungen" ("A Rose Has Sprung Up") | Anonymous | 16th century | Translated into English as "Lo, How A Rose E'er Blooming", "Lo, There A Rose Is Blooming", "There Is A Flower Springing", "A great and mighty wonder" |
| "Es ist für uns eine Zeit angekommen" ("The Time Has Arrived for Us") | Swiss traditional | 19th century | |
| "Es kommt ein Schiff, geladen" ("A Ship is Coming, laden") | Andernach songbook | 1608 | |
| "Es wird scho glei dumpa" ("It'll be dark soon") | Anton Reidinger | 1884 | Tirolean dialect song |
| "Freu dich, Erd und Sternenzelt" (Be joyful, Earth and starry sky) | | 1844 | based on a Czech model |
| "Fröhliche Weihnacht überall" ("Merry Christmas Everywhere") | German and English traditional | | |
| "Fröhlich soll mein Herze springen" ("Merrily my heart shall leap") | Paul Gerhardt / Johann Crüger · Johann Georg Ebeling | 1653 (lyrics)/ 1553 (Crüger) · ? (Ebeling) | |
| "Gelobet seist du, Jesu Christ" ("Praise be to You, Jesus Christ") | Martin Luther | 1524 | |
| "Herbei, oh ihr Gläubigen" ("O Come, All Ye Faithful") | Translation of "Adeste fideles" by Friedrich Heinrich Ranke in 1823. | 17th century | |
| "Ich steh an deiner Krippen hier" ("I stand here by your manger") | Paul Gerhardt / Martin Luther · Johann Sebastian Bach | 1653 (lyrics)/ 1542 (Luther melody) · 1736 (Bach melody) | |
| "Ihr Kinderlein, kommet" ("Oh, Come, Little Children") | Johann Abraham Peter Schulz / Christoph von Schmid | 1794 (music)/ 1798 (lyrics)/ 1832 (combination of text and music) | |
| "In dulci jubilo" ("In Sweet Rejoicing") | | 14th century | |
| "Jauchzet, ihr Himmel" ("Rejoice, you Heavens") | traditional | 14th century | |
| "Kling Glöckchen" ("Ring Little Bell") | traditional /Karl Enslin | 19th century | |
| "Kommet, ihr Hirten" ("Come, you shepherds") | Carl Riedel after Czech "Nesem vám noviny" | c. 1870 | |
| "Kommt und lasst uns Christus ehren" ("Come, let us praise Christ"), from Latin "Quem pastores laudavere" | Bohemian traditional 15th century | | "Come, and Christ the Lord be praising", "He whom joyous shepherds praised", and more |
| "Lasst uns das Kindlein grüßen" ("Let Us Greet the Little Child") | traditional | | |
| "Lasst uns das Kindlein wiegen" ("Let Us Cradle the Little Child") | Munich | 1604 | |
| "Lasst uns froh und munter sein" ("Let Us Be Happy and Cheerful") | traditional from the Hunsrück | | this song is traditionally sung at Nicholas Eve on 6 December |
| "Leise rieselt der Schnee" ("Softly Falls Every Snow Flake") | Eduard Ebel / Eduard Ebel | about 1900 | |
| "Lobt Gott, ihr Christen alle gleich" ("Praise God, you Christians equally") | Nikolaus Herman | 1560 | |
| "Maria durch ein Dornwald ging" ("Mary Walks Amid the Thorns") | traditional from Hesse | 16th century | |
| "Menschen, die ihr wart verloren" ("Humans, you who were lost") | Christoph Bernhard Verspoell | 1810 | |
| "Morgen, Kinder, wird's was geben" ("Tomorrow, Children, Something Will Happen") | Carl Gottlieb Hering / Philipp Bartsch | 1850 | |
| "Morgen kommt der Weihnachtsmann" ("Tomorrow comes Santa Claus") | A. H. Hoffmann von Fallersleben | 17th century | |
| "Nun liebe Seel, nun ist es Zeit" ("Now, dear Soul, it is the time") | Georg Weissel | 1642 | |
| "O du fröhliche" ("Oh You Joyful") | Johannes Daniel Falk / Heinrich Holzschuher | 1816 | "Oh, how joyfully", Christopher Wren, Together in song #330; "Oh thou joyful", Henry Katterjohn, Chalice Hymnal#169 |
| "O Tannenbaum" ("O Christmas Tree") | German traditional/ E. Anschütz, A. Zarnack | 16th century | translated into English as "O, Christmas Tree", 1824 |
| "O Tannenbaum, du trägst ein grünen Zweig" ("O Christmas Tree, you Wear a Green Branch") | Westphalian traditional | | |
| "Schneeflöckchen, Weißröckchen" ("Little Snow Flake, Little White Coat") | Hedwig Haberkern | 1869 | |
| "Stern über Bethlehem" ("Star above Bethlehem") | Alfred Hans Zoller | 1964 | star singers' song |
| "Still, still, still" ("Hush, hush, hush") | Maria Vinzenz Süß / Georg Götsch | 1865 | |
| "Stille Nacht, Heilige Nacht" | Josef Mohr / Franz Xaver Gruber | 1818 | "Silent Night", in the English translation by John Freeman Young |
| "Süßer die Glocken nie klingen" ("The Bells Never Sound Sweeter") | traditional /Wilhelm Kritzinger | | |
| "Tausend Sterne sind ein Dom" ("Thousands of Stars form a dome") | Siegfried Köhler | 1946 | |
| "Tochter Zion, freue dich" ("Daughter Zion, Rejoice!") | George Frideric Handel | | |
| "Vom Himmel hoch, da komm ich her" ("From Heaven Above to Earth I Come") | traditional / Martin Luther | 1539 | "From heaven high I come to you", by Catherine Winkworth, Trinity Psalter Hymnal #304 |
| "Vom Himmel hoch, o Engel, kommt" ("From Heaven Above, o Angels Come") | traditional from Cologne | 1623 | |
| "Wie schön leuchtet der Morgenstern" ("How Lovely Shines the Morning Star") | Philipp Nicolai | 16th century | |
| "Zu Bethlehem geboren" ("Born in Bethlehem") | Friedrich Spee / French melody | 1638 | |
| Sind die Lichter angezündet | Erika Engel / Hans Sandig | 1950/1957 | https://www.musicalion.com/de/scores/noten/222506/hans-sandig/44542/sind-die-lichter-angez%C3%BCndet#interpretation=1 |

== Greek ==
| Title | Composer / lyricist | Year published | Notes |
|---|---|---|---|
| "Βυζαντινά" ("Byzantine Carol") | Traditional carols from the Byzantine Era | 11th century | (Byzantine Greek: Άναρχος θεός καταβέβηκεν, Ánarkhos Theós katabébēken, "God, who has no beginning, descended") |
| "Απόψε Χριστός γεννήθηκε" ("Tonight Christ was born") | Greek Traditional | | |
| "Κάλαντα Χριστουγέννων" ("Christmas Carol") | Greek Traditional | | Also known simply by its first verse: "Καλήν Εσπέραν Άρχοντες". There exist many local variations of the same carol with changes in the lyrics( ex. Smyrnian, Anatolian, Cretan, Cappadocian, Pontic, Thracian and others) |
| "Κάλαντα Πελοποννήσου" ("Carols of Peloponnese") | Traditional from Peloponnese | | "Christoúgenna, Prōtoúgenna" ("Christmas, Firstmas") |
| "Κάλαντα Πρωτοχρονιάς" ("New Year's Carols") | Greek Traditional | | "Archimēniá ki archichroniá" ("First of the month, first of the year"). |
| "Των Φώτων" ("Epiphany Carols") | Greek Traditional | | (Greek: Σήμερα τα φώτα κι ο φωτισμός, "Today is the Epiphany and the Enlightenment") |

== Hungarian ==
| Title | Composer / lyricist | Year published | Notes |
|---|---|---|---|
| "Mennyből az angyal" ("Angels from Heaven") | | | |
| "Pásztorok, Pásztorok" | | | |
| "Kis karácsony, nagy karácsony" ("Little Christmas, Big Christmas") | | | |
| "Fel nagy örömre" | Géza Gárdonyi | | |
| "Pásztorok keljünk fel" | | | |
| "Dicsőség mennyben az Istennek" | Based on Luke 2:14 | | |
| "Ó, gyönyörű szép" | | | |
| "A kis Jézus arany alma" | | | |
| "Csordapásztorok" | Hungarian Traditional | | |
| "Bethlehemi királyok" (also known as "Három királyok") ("Three kings") | Lyrics by Attila József | | |

== Indonesian ==
| Title | Composer/lyricist | Year published | Notes |
|---|---|---|---|
| Nunga Jumpang Muse Ari Pesta I (Bataknese); Sendah Jumpa Wari Raya Kita E (Karonese); Sudah Tiba Hari Raya yang Kudus (Indonesian) | words by Rev. J. A. U. Doloksaribu, M. Min. (Indonesian and Bataknese) words by Rev. N. Ginting Munthe (Karonese) | | These songs are set to Battle Hymn of the Republic tune |

== Irish ==
| Title | Composer / lyricist | Year published | Notes |
|---|---|---|---|
| "An Angel This Night" | words by Fr. Luke Waddinge | 17th century | Irish traditional, Part of "The Kilmore Carols" |
| "The Angel Said to Joseph Mild" | words by Fr. Luke Waddinge | 17th century | Irish traditional, (short carol) |
| "Behold Three Kings Come From the East" | words by Fr. Luke Waddinge | 17th century | Irish traditional, (short carol) |
| "Christmas Day Is Come" (also known as "The Irish Carol") | words by Fr. William Devereaux, | 18th century | Irish traditional, Part of "The Kilmore Carols" |
| "Codail A Linbh" / "Codail a Leanbh" ("Sleep Child") | Lyrics are from 5th century poem, music by Michael McGlynn | | |
| "The Kerry Christmas Carol" | Irish traditional | | |
| "Curoo Curoo" ("The Carol of the Birds") | Irish traditional | | |
| "Dia do Bheatha" ("Welcome") | Irish traditional | | |
| "The Darkest Midnight in December" | words by Fr. William Devereaux | 18th century | Irish traditional, Part of "The Kilmore Carols" |
| "Don Oíche Úd i mBeithil" ("That Night in Bethlehem") | Irish traditional | | |
| "The First Day of the Year" | words by Fr. Luke Waddinge | 17th century | Irish traditional, Part of "The Kilmore Carols" |
| "Hail Ye Flowers of Martyrs" | words by Fr. Luke Waddinge | 17th century | Irish traditional, Part of "The Kilmore Carols" |
| "Jerusalem, Our Happy Home" | words by Fr. William Devereaux | 18th century | Irish traditional, Part of "The Kilmore Carols" |
| "Now To Conclude Our Christmas Mirth" | words by Fr. William Devereaux | 18th century | Irish traditional, Part of "The Kilmore Carols" |
| "Oíche Nollag" ("Christmas Eve") | Irish traditional | | |
| "St John did Lean on Jesus' Breast" | words by Fr. Luke Waddinge | 17th century | Irish traditional, (short carol) |
| "St Stephen Had an Angel's Face" | words by Fr. Luke Waddinge | 17th century | Irish traditional, (short carol) |
| "Suantraí na Maighdine" ("The Virgin's Lullaby") | Irish traditional | | Also known as "The Christ Child's Lullaby" or "Mary's Lullaby" |
| "Sweet Jesus Was the Sacred Name" | words by Fr. Luke Waddinge | 17th century | Irish traditional, (short carol) |
| "Sweetest of All Names, Jesus" | words by Fr. William Devereaux | 18th century | Irish traditional, Part of "The Kilmore Carols" |
| "An Teitheadh go hÉigipt" ("The Flight to Egypt") | Irish traditional | | |
| "This Christmass Day You Pray me Sing" | words by Fr. Luke Waddinge | 17th century | Irish traditional, (short carol) |
| "This Feast of St Sylvester So Well Deserves a Song" | words by Fr. William Devereaux | 18th century | Irish traditional, Part of "The Kilmore Carols" |
| "This is our Christmas Day" | words by Fr. Luke Waddinge | 17th century | Irish traditional, (short carol) |
| "This is St Stephen's Day" | words by Fr. Luke Waddinge | 17th century | Irish traditional, Part of "The Kilmore Carols" |
| "To Greet Our Saviour's Dear One" | words by Fr. Luke Waddinge | 17th century | Irish traditional, Part of "The Kilmore Carols" |
| "A Virgin Queen in Bethlehem" | words by Fr. William Devereaux | 18th century | Irish traditional, Part of "The Kilmore Carols" |
| "Wexford Carol" (also "Enniscorthy Carol") | Irish traditional | | |
| "Ye Sons of Men with Me Rejoice" | words by Fr. William Devereaux | 18th century | Irish traditional, Part of "The Kilmore Carols" |

== Italian ==
| Title | Composer / lyricist | Year published | Notes |
|---|---|---|---|
| "Gesù bambino" ("The Infant Jesus") | Pietro Yon | 1917 | "When Blossoms Flowered" in English |
| "Tu scendi dalle stelle" ("From Starry Skies Thou Comest") | Italian traditional | | |
| "Dormi, dormi, bel Bambin" | | | |

== Korean ==
| Title | Composer / lyricist | Year published | Notes |
|---|---|---|---|
| "The Carol" | words by G-High, 최영경 (Choi Youngkyoung) music by G-High, 최영경 (Choi Youngkyoung), 박아셀 (Asher Park) | 2016 | Sung by Heejin, Haseul, and Hyunjin. |
| "The Carol 2.0" | words by G-High, 최영경 (Choi Youngkyoung) music by G-High, 최영경 (Choi Youngkyoung), 박아셀 (Asher Park) | 2017 | Sung by ViVi, Choerry, and Yves. It is another variation of "The Carol". |
| "The Carol 3.0" | words by G-High, 최영경 (Choi Youngkyoung) music by G-High, 최영경 (Choi Youngkyoung), 박아셀 (Asher Park) | 2023 | Sung by ARTMS. It is another variation of "The Carol". There is also an English version of the song. |

== Latin ==
| Title | Composer / lyricist | Year published | Notes |
|---|---|---|---|
| "Adeste Fideles" ("O Come, All Ye Faithful") | attributed to John Francis Wade, Latin words translated by Frederick Oakeley | c. 1743 | |
| "Angelus ad Virginem" | | 13th-century or older. | |
| "Dona nobis pacem" | Perhaps Mozart | | A 3-voice round. |
| "Gaudete" ("Rejoice") | sacred Christmas carol | 1582 | re-popularized by Steeleye Span (1973) |
| "Hodie Christus natus est" | Jan Pieterszoon Sweelinck | 1619 | Originally published in Cantiones Sacrae |
| "In dulci jubilo" | Heinrich Seuse | 1328 | Macaronic carol known in several translations; melody is also used for the English song "Good Christian Men, Rejoice" (aka, "Good Christian Friends, Rejoice"). |
| "Laetabundus" | attributed to Bernard of Clairvaux | 12th century | |
| "O Sanctissima" ("O du Fröhliche" or "Oh, How Joyfully") | | | |
| Personent hodie | | 1582 | Originally published in Finland, but with Latin lyrics |
| "Psallite, unigenito" | Michael Praetorius | 1609 | First published in Musae Sioniae VI |
| "Puer Natus in Bethlehem" | | Text early 13th-century (or older); melody 14th century | Sped up version of a Gregorian chant. |
| "Pueri Concinite" | Johann von Herbeck | 1868 | First performed in the Imperial Chapel, Vienna, on Christmas. |
| "Resonet in laudibus" | | 14th century | |

== Malay ==
| Title | Composer / lyricist | Year published | Notes |
|---|---|---|---|
| "Anak Yesus dilahirkan" ("Little Jesus has Born") | | | |
| "Kelahiran Penebus" | St Dominic | | |
| "Gloria" | St Dominic | | |
| "Malak Bergemar" ("Angels Sings") | | | |
| Cahaya Natal ("Christmas Light") | | | Advent Hymns |
| Ada Seru Kedengaran | | | Advent Hymns |
| Berjaga-Jagalah | | | Advent Hymns |
| Penantian Penebus ("Await of Messiah") | St John, Tuaran | 2019 | Advent Hymns |

== Norwegian ==
| Title | Composer / lyricist | Year published | Notes |
|---|---|---|---|
| "Musevisa" | Alf Prøysen | 1946 | Lyrics are by Prøysen, set to a traditional tune |
| "Eit barn er født i Betlehem" | Ørjan Matre | | |

== Occitan ==
| Title | Composer / lyricist | Year published | Notes |
|---|---|---|---|
| "La Cambo me fai mau" ("My leg hurts") | Nicolas Saboly / anonymous | | |

== Polish ==
| Title | Composer / lyricist | Year published | Notes |
|---|---|---|---|
| "Ach, ubogi żłobie" ("Oh, the humble manger") | Piotr Studziński / anonymous | 17th century | |
| "Ach, witajże pożądana" ("Oh, to be greeting desired") | Traditional | <1908 | |
| "Anioł pasterzom mówił" ("The angel told the shepherds") | Traditional | 1551–1555 | |
| "A wczora z wieczora" ("And yesterday on evening") | Traditional | <1630 | |
| "Będzie kolęda" ("It will be a carol") | Andrzej Zieliński / Wojciech Młynarski | 1968 | Skaldowie |
| "Bóg się rodzi" ("God Is Born") | Franciszek Karpiński | 1792 | |
| "Bracia patrzcie jeno" ("Brothers let you look on how the sky is burning") | Franciszek Karpiński | <1825 | |
| "Do szopy, hej, pasterze" ("To the shed, hey, shepherds") | Traditional | | |
| "Dzisiaj w Betlejem" ("Today in Bethlehem") | Traditional | 1878 | |
| "Gdy się Chrystus rodzi" ("When the Christ's being born") | Traditional | 1843 | |
| "Gdy śliczna Panna" ("As the beautiful Virgin [cradled Her Son]") | Traditional | beginning of 18th century | |
| "Gore gwiazda Jezusowi" ("A star is shining to Jesus") | Traditional | 18th century | |
| "Hej, w dzień narodzenia" ("Hey, on the day of the Nativity") | Traditional | | |
| "Jasna Panna" ("The Bright Lady") | Traditional | | |
| "Jest taki dzień" ("There is such a day") | Seweryn Krajewski / Krzysztof Dzikowski | 1966 | Czerwone Gitary |
| "Jezus malusieńki" ("The wee baby Jesus") | Traditional | | |
| "Jezusa narodzonego" ("Born Jesus [let's all greet]") | Traditional | 18th century | |
| "Jezusicek malusieński" ("Little baby Jesus on hay") | Traditional (Goral) | | |
| "Kolęda dla nieobecnych" ("A carol for absent") | Szymon Mucha | 1997 | |
| "Lulajże, Jezuniu" (Sleep now, baby Jesus") | Traditional | 1738 | Frédéric Chopin used this Christmas carol in the Scherzo in B minor, Op. 20 |
| "Mędrcy świata, Monarchowie" ("O, Sages of the world, Monarchs") | Traditional | 17th century | |
| "Mizerna, cicha" ("Humble and quiet [shabby little stable]") | Jan Gall / Teofil Lenartowicz | 1849 | |
| "Nie było miejsca dla Ciebie" ("There was no place for You") | Jozef Las / Mateusz Jez | 1932 | |
| "Nowy Rok bieży" ("New Year is coming") | Traditional | 17th century | |
| "Nuż my dziś krześcijani" | Traditional | | |
| "O gwiazdo betlejemska" ("O betlehem star") | Zygmunt Odelgiewicz, Alojzy Orszulok | 19th century | |
| "Oj, Maluśki, Maluśki, Maluśki" ("Oh, Tiny Little [like a little glove]") | Traditional highland-style | <1808 | |
| "Pasterze mili coście widzieli" ("Kind shepherds what you've seen") | Traditional | <1752 | |
| "Pokłon Jezusowi" | Traditional | | |
| "Pójdźmy wszyscy do stajenki" ("Let us go to the little shed") | Traditional | <1842 in Kraków | |
| "Północ już była" ("Midnight was already [when it appeared]") | Traditional | ~1843 | |
| "Przybieżeli do Betlejem" ("To Betlehem came [the shepherds]") | Traditional | 17th century | |
| "Skrzypi wóz" ("The cart creaks") | Karol Miarka | 1904 | |
| "Tryumfy Króla Niebieskiego" ("The Triumphs of the Heaven's King") | Traditional | 1754 | |
| "Uciekali, uciekali" ("They ran away, ran away") | Agata Miklaszewska, Maryna Miklaszewska | 1991 | |
| "Wesołą nowinę" ("The joyous news [hear, o my brothers]") | Traditional / Józef Wygrzywalski | | |
| "Wesoły nam ten to dzień Pan sprawił" | Traditional | | |
| "Witaj Synu najśliczniejszy" | Karol Miarka | 1904 | |
| "W kropki zielone" ("With green dotted") | Krzesimir Dębski / Jan Twardowski | 1998 | sung by Ewa Małas-Godlewska |
| "Wśród nocnej ciszy" ("In the night silence") | Traditional | <1853 | |
| "W żłobie leży" ("Infant Holy, Infant Lowly") | Piotr Skarga | 17th century | |
| "Z narodzenia Pana" ("Because of the Lord's birth [it's a joyful day]") | Traditional | 1842 | |
| "Zdrów bądź, królu anjelski" | Traditional | 1424 | |

== Portuguese ==
| Title | Composer / lyricist | Year published | Notes |
|---|---|---|---|
| "A todos um Bom Natal" ("Merry Christmas To You All") | César Batalha/Lúcia Carvalho | 1980 | |
| "Alegrem-se os Céus e a Terra" ("Rejoice, You Heavens And Earth") | Traditional | 18th century | |
| "Beijai o Menino" ("Give Infant Jesus A Kiss") | Traditional | 1934 | |
| "Eu hei de dar ao Menino" ("I Shall Give The Boy") | Traditional | 18th century | |
| "Eu hei de m'ir ao presépio" ("I Shall Visit The Manger") | Traditional | 19-20th century | Translated into English as "I See Your Cradle is Bare" by Lorenz Maierhofer |
| "José embala o Menino" ("Joseph Cradles The Infant Jesus") | Traditional | 1947 | |
| "Natal africano" ("African Christmas") | Traditional | | |
| "Natal da Índia Portuguesa" ("Portuguese India Carol") | Traditional | 18th century | |
| "Natal dos Simples" ("Carol of the Poor") | José Afonso | 1968 | A New Year's carol |
| "O Menino está com frio" ("The Infant Jesus Is Cold") | Traditional | 16th century | |
| "O Menino está dormindo" ("The Infant Jesus Is Sleeping") | Traditional | 18–19th century | |
| "Oh bento airoso" ("O Blessed And Graceful Mystery") | Traditional | 15–16th century | |
| "Pela Noite de Natal" ("It Was Christmas Night") | Traditional | 16th century | Translated into English as "All That Wondrous Christmas Night" by Eduardo Marzo |
| "Roxozinho está deitado" ("The Rosy-cheeked Boy Is Lying") | Traditional | 1889 | |
| "Sã qui turo zente pleta" ("All Here Are Black People") | Anonymous | 1643 | |

== Romanian ==
| Title | Composer / lyricist | Year published | Notes |
|---|---|---|---|
| "O, ce veste minunată!" ("Oh. what wonderful news") | D. G. Kiriac | | |
| "Pluguşorul" ("The little plow") | Traditional | | related rather to New Year's Eve |
| "Deschide uşa, creştine!" ("Open the door, christian") | Traditional | | |
| "Linu-i lin" | Traditional | | |
| "Florile dalbe" ("The whitened flowers") | Traditional | | |
| "Domn, domn sa-năltăm!" ("Lord, lord, let's praise") | Gheorghe Cucu | | |
| "Leganelul Lui Iisus" ("Jesus' swing") | Valentin Teodorian | | |
| "Asta-i seara de Craciun" (It's the Christmas evening") | Traditional | | |
| "Mos Craciun cu plete dalbe" ("Santa Claus with whithened hair") | Ioan D. Chirescu | | |
| "Cantec de Craciun" ("Christmas song") | Traditional | | |
| "Trei Pastori" ("Three shepherds") | Timotei Popovici | | |
| "Sus la Poarta Raiului" ("High at the Heaven's gate") | Emil Montia | | |
| Colindița ("The little carol will be over") | Traditional | | |
| La casa de peste drum ("At the house over the road") | Tradițional | | |
| După dealul cel mai mare ("Over the largest hill") | Traditional | | |
| Slobozî-ne gazdă-n casă ("Let us, host, in the house") | Traditional | | |
| Din an în an ("From year to year") | Traditional | | |
| Oaspeți cu azur în gene ("Guest with azure in the genes") | Nichifor Crainic | | |
| Steaua sus răsare ("The star is rising high") | Traditional | | |
| Astăzi s-a născut Hristos ("Today Christ was born") | Traditional | | |
| Cerul și pământul ("The Heavens and the earth") | Traditional | | |
| Iată vin colindători ("Here they come, carol singers") | Traditional | | |
| La Viflaim colo-n jos ("In Bethleem, down") | Traditional | | |
| Mărire-ntru cele-nalte ("Praise the high") | Traditional | | |
| Sculați gazde, nu dormiți (Wake up, hosts, don't sleep") | Traditional | | |
| Noapte de vis ("Dream night") | Traditional | | |
| O, brad frumos | | | Adapted from various carols such as "Oh, Tannenbaum" |
| Sus, boieri, nu mai dormiți ("Wake up, boyars(lords), don't sleep") | Traditional | | |
| Trei crai de la Răsărit ("Three princes from Orient") | Traditional | | |
| Afara ninge linistit ("Outside it's snowing peacefuly") | Traditional | | |
| Aseara pe-nserate ("Yesternight in the evening") | Traditional | | |
| An cu an de-a randul ("Year by year, every time") | Traditional | | |
| A sosit ziua cea sfanta ("The holy day has come") | Traditional | | |
| Astazi-i sara sara mare | Traditional | | |
| A coborat pe pamant ("He descended onto earth") | Traditional | | |
| Buna dimineata, la Mos Ajun ("Good morning, Old Man Eve") | Traditional | | |
| Buna seara, gazda mare ("Good evening, great host") | Traditional | | |
| Buna veste-n zori ("Good news at dawn") | Traditional | | |

== Scottish ==
| Title | Composer / lyricist | Year published | Notes |
|---|---|---|---|
| "Taladh Chriosda" ("Christ's Lullaby") | Traditional | | known among English speakers as "The Christ-Child's Lullaby", as popularized by Marjory Kennedy-Fraser |
| "Baloo, Lammy" ("Lullaby, Little Lamb") | Traditional | | |

== Spanish ==
| Title | Composer / lyricist | Year published | Notes |
|---|---|---|---|
| "Arre borriquito" ("Giddy up little donkey") | Music: Ricardo Boronat Lyrics: Diego San José de la Torre | Between 1925 and 1930 | Military origin, which explains the drum-based backdrop |
| "Hacia Belén va una burra" ("To Bethlehem goes a donkey") | Father Antonio Soler | 18th century | Very popular in both Spain and LATAM, composed by a religious scholar (allegedly) of Castilian origin |
| "Ay del chiquirritín" ("Oh little boy") | Traditional | Unknown | Probably of Andalusian or Navarran origin |
| "La marimorena" | Traditional, based on a Spanish drinking song | 1702 | Tells the story of the interruption of a religious ceremony by a popular celebration, among which was a certain "María Morena" who gives the carol its name. |
| "Campana sobre campana" or "Campanas de Belén" ("Bells of Bethlehem") | Traditional | Early 20th century | One of the most translated Spanish carols, believed to be of Andalusian origin |
| "Dime niño de quién eres" ("Tell me boy, where do you come from") | Traditional | 18th century | Murcia or Andalusian origin |
| "Canta, ríe y bebe" ("Sing, laugh and drink") | Traditional, adapted by Manuel Navarro Mollor | 20th century | Originally a popular song with very edgy lyrics, was later adapted by Francoist Spain's censorship to be more appropriate. |
| "Ya vienen los Reyes Magos" ("The three wise men are coming already") | Traditional, adapted by Manuel Navarro Mollor | 18th century | Origin unclear. |
| "Madre, en la puerta hay un niño" ("Mother, there's a boy at the door") | Traditional | Unknown | Origin unclear. Tells the story of baby Christ knocking on people's doors, asking for refuge from the cold. |
| "Ya viene la vieja" ("The old hag is coming already") | Traditional | Unknown | Popular Castilian song about an old lady who comes to give the Christmas aguinaldo. |
| "Los peces en el río" | Traditional | | |
| "Alegría, alegría, alegría" | Traditional | | |
| "Pastores venid" | Traditional | | |
| "A la Nanita Nana" | Juan Francisco Muñoz y Pavón | 1904 | The song was compiled by musicologist Kurt Schindler in his work Folk music and poetry of Spain and Portugal. |
| "Vamos todos a Belen" | | | |
| "Vamos cantemos somos ocho" ("Let us sing, we are eight") | Benito Cabrera | 1995 | Traditional carol from the Canary Islands, recently updated to include all eight independent islands. |

== Swedish ==
| Title | Composer / lyricist | Year published | Notes |
|---|---|---|---|
| "Giv mig ej glans, ej guld, ej prakt" ("Give Me No Splendour, Gold, or Pomp") | words by Zachris Topelius (1887); music by Jean Sibelius (1909) | | Finland Swedish song |
| "Gläns över sjö och strand" ("Shine Over the Lake and the Shore") | words by Viktor Rydberg (1891) music by Alice Tegnér (1893) | | |
| "När det lider mot jul" ("When Christmas Has Come") | words by Jeanna Oterdahl; music by Ruben Liljefors (1909) | | |
| "Jul, jul, strålande jul" ("Christmas, Christmas, Glorious Christmas") | words by Edvard Evers; music by Gustaf Nordqvist | 1921 | |
| "Nu har vi ljus här i vårt hus" ("We have Kindled the Candles in Our House Now") | | | in Sweden it is tradition to dance around the Christmas tree and sing, this being one of the traditional songs sung |
| "Nu tändas tusen juleljus" ("We Have Kindled Thousands of Christmas Lights Now") | words and music by Emmy Köhler | | |
| "Räven raskar över isen" (The Fox Is Sliding Over the Ice) | | | in Sweden it is tradition to dance around the Christmas tree and sing, this being one of the traditional songs sung |
| "Sankta Lucia" ("Santa Lucia") | | | |
| "Var hälsad, sköna morgonstund" ("All Hail to Thee, O Blessed Morn") | words by Johan Olof Wallin; music by Philipp Nicolai | | |

== Ukrainian ==
| Title | Composer / lyricist | Year published | Notes |
|---|---|---|---|
| "Бог предвічний народився" "Boh predvičnyj narodyvsia" (God Eternal is Born) | | 1790 | Probably considered the quintessential Ukrainian carol |
| "Небо і земля нині торжествують" "Nebo i zemlia nyni torzhestvuiut" (Heaven and Earth Rejoice Today) | | 1790 | Refrain is often sung as a round. |
| "Бог ся рождає" "Boh sia rozhdaie" (God is Born) | Ostap Nyzhankivsky | | |
| "Во Вифлиємі нині новина" "Vo Vyfleiemi nyni novyna" (In Bethlehem today there are tidings) | Ostap Nyzhankivsky | | |
| "Добрий вечір тобі, пане господарю" Dobryi vechir tobi, pane hospodariu" (Good Evening to You) | | | Sung when caroling, upon arrival at a house; not used in church. Video |
| "Нова радість стала" "Nova radist stala" (A New Joy Came) | | 1790 | Recorded as a folk song by Pavlo Chubynskyi during the 1870s. Numerous variations exist, including one used by Ukrainian rebels during the 1940s. |
| На небі зірка ясна засяла "Na nebi zirka yasna zasiiala" (In the Heavens a Bright Star Shone) | | | |
| Ой по всім світі сталася новина "Oi po vsim sviti stalasia novyna" (Oh, over all the Earth a New Event Occurred) | | | |
| Ой як сей ґазда з дому відходив "Oi yak sei gazda z domu vidkhodyv" (Oh, how did this owner leave the house) | | | Traditional Hutsul carol dedicated to spirits of dead ancestors |
| "Виді Бог, виді Сотворитель" "Vydi Boh, vydi Sotvorytel" (God, the Creator, Sees) | apocryphal arranged by Kyrylo Stetsenko | 1790 | Video |
| Спи, Ісусе, спи "Spy, Isuse, spy" (Sleep, Jesus, Sleep) | | | |
| "Днесь поюще" "Dnes poyusche" (Singing Today) | arranged by Kyrylo Stetsenko | | |
| "Щедрик" "Shchedryk" | arranged by Mykola Leontovych | 1901; 1919 (final version) | Not truly a Christmas carol, but rather, a secular song of good wishes for prosperity, traditionally sung on Щедрий Вечір (Shchedryi Vechir, i.e. Theophany Eve). Melody used for the English "Carol of the Bells" and, in the 1970s-1980s, for André champagne commercials. |

See also: List of Ukrainian Koliadkas and Shchedrivkas

== Vietnamese ==
| Title | Composer / lyricist | Year published | Notes |
|---|---|---|---|
| "Hang Bêlem" ("The Cave of Bethlehem") | Hải Linh (Composer) / Minh Châu (Lyrics) | 1945 | |
| "Cao Cung Lên" ("Lift Up High/Angels We Have Heard on High") | Rev. Hoài Đức & Nguyễn Khắc Xuyên | 1946 | |

== Welsh ==
| Title | Composer / lyricist | Year published | Notes |
|---|---|---|---|
| "Ar Hyd y Nos" ("All Through the Night") | Edward Jones (Composer) / John Ceiriog Hughes (Welsh lyrics) | 1784 | translated into English as "All Through the Night" with English lyrics by Harold Boulton (English Lyrics) |
| "Oer yw'r gŵr sy'n methu caru" | Thomas Oliphant (English lyrics) | 1862-74 | rendered in English as "Deck the Hall" |
| "Tua Bethlem Dref" | David Evann (composer) / Wil Ifan (lyricist) | 1934 | rendered in English as "Towards Bethlehem Town" |

== See also ==
- Christmas music
- List of best-selling Christmas singles in the United States
- List of Christmas hit singles in the United Kingdom
- List of Filipino Christmas carols and songs
- List of popular Christmas singles in the United States
- Category:Christmas carol collections
