= The First Nowell (Vaughan Williams) =

Cantata by Ralph Vaughan Williams

- Choral work by Ralph Vaughan Williams
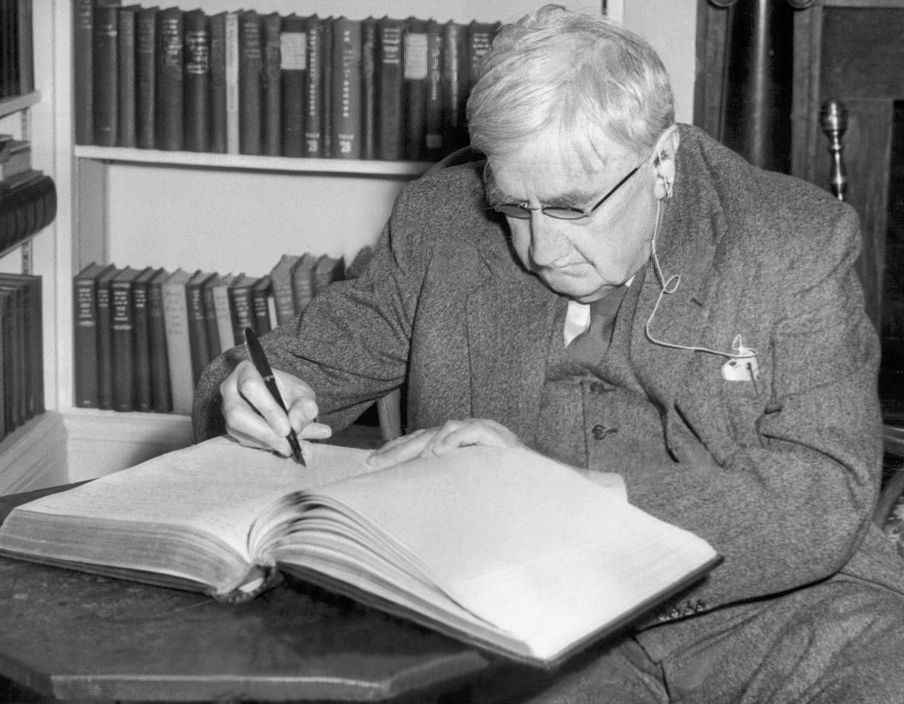
- The composer in 1954
- Occasion: St. Martin-in-the-Fields charity matinee
- Text: Christmas carols, medieval pageants by Simona Pakenham
- Language: English
- Composed: 1958
- Performed: 19 December 1958
- Scoring: soprano; baritone; SATB chorus; orchestra

The First Nowell is a choral work for soprano and baritone soloists, SATB chorus and full orchestra by English composer Ralph Vaughan Williams written in 1958 and completed by Roy Douglas following the composer's death in August of that year.

The First Nowell was written to accompany a nativity play adapted from medieval pageants by Simona Pakenham. Pakenham recalled:

In early July 1958, I was asked by Austin Williams, the vicar of St. Martin-in-the-Fields, to persuade Vaughan Williams to collaborate with me on the writing of a nativity play. This was to be given at a matinee at Drury Lane Theatre on 19 December in support of the Ockendon Venture – a charity that was building a village to house refugee children. I hesitated to put this to Vaughan Williams because I knew he was always busy with the composition of the moment... I went to tea at Hanover Terrace on 6 July and I was astonished that he considered the idea at all. The mere mention of Christmas inspired him. He had a passion for carols.

It was first performed at the Theatre Royal, Drury Lane on 19 December 1958 with the St. Martin-in-the-Fields Concert Orchestra and Singers conducted by John Churchill, and produced by Noel Iliff and Geraldine Stephenson.

The work presents a sequence of carols and scenes bookmarked between God Rest You Merry, Gentlemen and The First Nowell:

- Prelude: God rest you merry – The truth sent from above
- Angelus ad Virginem
- The Salutation Carol
- The Cherry Tree Carol part 1: Joseph was an old man
- The Cherry Tree Carol part 2: As Joseph was awalking
- Joseph and Mary
- In Bethlehem City, "A Virgin most pure"
- The Sussex Carol
- The Salutation Carol: 'Tidings true be come new
- How brightly shone the morning star
- Interlude
- The First Nowell

== Recordings ==
- The piece was recorded in 2006 by Richard Hickox, with Sarah Fox (soprano), Roderick Williams (baritone), the Joyful Company of Singers and the City of London Sinfonia.
- The London Philharmonic Orchestra have also released the work as a live recording with Vladimir Jurowski conducting, Lisa Milne (soprano) and Christopher Maltman (baritone).
