= Infant Holy, Infant Lowly =

Polish Christmas carol

- Native name: W żłobie leży
- Genre: Christmas carol
- Text: Traditional Polish, translated by Edith Margaret Gellibrand Reed
- Based on: Luke 2:7
- Meter: 8.7.7.8.8.7.7

W żłobie leży ("In the Manger He Lies") is a traditional Polish Christmas carol. In 1920, the song was translated into English as "Infant Holy, Infant Lowly" by Edith Margaret Gellibrand Reed (1885-1933), a British musician and playwright. Reed found the carol in the hymnal Śpiewniczek Pieśni Kościelne (published 1908), though the song itself may date back as far as the 13th century. The Polish text could possibly be attributed to Piotr Skarga (1536-1612). The carol’s melody refers to the coronation polonaise of the Polish king, Władysław IV Vasa.

Its rhythm resembles that of the polonaise, one of the Polish national dances popularized, among others, by Frédéric Chopin. The short, rhymed phrases lead to a crescendo in each stanza's final lines: "Christ the babe is lord of all, Christ the babe was born for you!"

== Polish lyrics ==
W żłobie leży! Któż pobieży
Kolędować małemu
Jezusowi Chrystusowi
Dziś nam narodzonemu?
Pastuszkowie przybywajcie
Jemu wdzięcznie przygrywajcie
Jako Panu naszemu.

My zaś sami z piosneczkami
Za wami pospieszymy
A tak Tego Maleńkiego
Niech wszyscy zobaczymy
Jak ubogo narodzony
Płacze w stajni położony
Więc go dziś ucieszymy.

== English lyrics ==
English lyrics by Edith Margaret Gellibrand Reed (As appears in Carols for Choirs, Book 1 and 100 Carols for Choirs)

Infant holy,
Infant lowly,
For His bed a cattle stall;
Oxen lowing,
Little knowing
Christ the Babe is Lord of all.
Swift are winging
Angels singing,
Noels ringing,
Tidings bringing,
Christ the Babe is Lord of all.

Flocks were sleeping,
Shepherds keeping
Vigil till the morning new;
Saw the glory,
Heard the story,
Tidings of a Gospel true.
Thus rejoicing,
Free from sorrow,
Praises voicing,
Greet the morrow,
Christ the Babe was born for you!

== Notable recordings ==
The carol has been recorded by:

- The Choir of St. Thomas NYC
- The Mormon Tabernacle Choir on their album Sing, Choirs of Angels! (2004)
- Choir of King's College, Cambridge
- Vocal Point on the album The Sing-Off: Songs of the Season (2011)
- Cara Dillon on the album Upon a Winter's Night (2016)
- Salisbury Cathedral Choir on their album Christmas at Salisbury (2010)
- Vancouver Chamber Choir on the album Classical Christmas (1997)
- Lorie Line on the album Home for the Holidays (1997)
- Kathleen Battle and Christopher Parkening on the album Angel's Glory (1996)
- Millennial Choirs and Orchestras on the single Infant Holy, Infant Lowly (2022)

== See also ==
- List of Christmas carols
