= Intimate Sketches (Janáček) =

Set of compositions by Leoš Janáček

Intimate Sketches (Czech: Intimní skici) is a collection of piano miniatures by Czech composer Leoš Janáček (1854–1928) published in 1994, sixty-six years after his death.

== The music ==
The thirteen pieces in the set, each only a minute or two long, were gathered from manuscripts and ephemeral publications, notably the People's News (Lidové noviny). Nos. 5, 6, 7, and 8 here are Nos. 3, 5, 12, and 13 respectively in the Album for Kamila Stösslová (Památník pro Kamilu Stösslovou).

No.	Catalogue	Date	Czech title	English title	German title
1.	JW VIII/31	published 1927	Malostranský palác (Andante)	Malá Strana Palace (Andante)	Kleinseiten-Palais (Andante)
2.	JW VIII/29	composed c. 1920–1926	Bez názvu	Untitled	Ohne Titel
3.	JW VIII/26	published 1923	Melodie (Con moto)	Melodie (Con moto)	Melodie (Con moto)
4.	JW VIII/21	published 1911	Moderato	Moderato	Moderato
5.	JV VIII/33/3	composed 1927	Jen slepý osud?	Just blind fate?	Nur blindes Schicksal?
6.	JW VIII/33/5	composed 1928	Aby už se nemohlo jíti nikdy zpět	So you can never return	Damit man nie zurück könnte
7.	JW VIII/33/12	composed 1928	Zlatý kroužek	The golden ring	Der goldene Ring
8.	JW VIII/33/13	composed 1928	Čekám Tě!	Waiting for you!	Ich erwarte Dich!
9.	JW IX/1	composed 1877	Rondo	Rondo	Rondo
10.	JW VIII/9	composed c. 1887	Na památku	In memoriam	Zum Andenken
11.	JW V/2/28	composed 1896	Své Olze	My Olga	Meiner Olga
12.	JW V/14	published 1920	Ukolébavka	Lullaby	Wiegenlied
13.	JW VIII/20	published 1909	Narodil se Kristus pán	Christ the Lord is born	Geboren ist Herr Jesu Christ

== Recordings ==
Håkon Austbø plays eleven of the pieces on his Janáček: Piano Works (Complete) (Brilliant Classics, 2005). Thomas Adès plays six of them on his recording of The Diary of One Who Disappeared with Ian Bostridge (EMI, 2001). Sarah Lavaud has recorded 5 of the pieces on a CD published by Hortus. Lars David Kellner has recorded all pieces except the 'Rondo' (a juvenile work) on his 3-CD Janacek compilation (HOFA, 2013).

== Related scores ==
Intimate Sketches was followed by a second volume of twenty-six miniatures called Moravian Dances (Moravské tance).
