= Kling, Glöckchen =

German Christmas carol

"Kling, Glöckchen"
Performed by the Chamber Winds of the United States Air Forces in Europe Band

"Kling, Glöckchen", or "Ring, Little Bell", is a German Christmas carol from the 19th century. The lyrics were written by Karl Enslin (1819–1875) to a traditional German folk tune. According to other sources, it was set to music in 1884 by Benedikt Widmann (1820–1910).

== Lyrics ==
Kling, Glöckchen, klingelingeling,
kling, Glöckchen, kling!
Laßt mich ein, ihr Kinder,
ist so kalt der Winter,
öffnet mir die Türen,
laßt mich nicht erfrieren!
Kling, Glöckchen, klingelingeling,
kling, Glöckchen, kling!

Kling, Glöckchen, klingelingeling,
Kling, Glöckchen, kling!
Mädchen, hört, und Bübchen,
macht mir auf das Stübchen,
bring euch viele Gaben,
sollt euch dran erlaben.
Kling, Glöckchen, klingelingeling,
kling, Glöckchen, kling!

Kling, Glöckchen, klingelingeling,
kling, Glöckchen, kling!
Hell erglühn die Kerzen,
öffnet mir die Herzen!
Will drin wohnen fröhlich,
frommes Kind, wie selig.
Kling, Glöckchen, klingelingeling,
kling, Glöckchen, kling!

Ring, little bell, ringalingaling,
Ring, little bell, ring!
Let me in, you kids,
So cold is the winter,
Open the doors for me,
Don't let me freeze!
Ring, little bell, ringalingaling,
Ring, little bell, ring!

Ring, little bell, ringalingaling,
Ring, little bell, ring!
Girls, listen, and boys,
Open up the room for me,
I bring you many gifts,
You should enjoy them!
Ring, little bell, ringalingaling,
Ring, little bell, ring!

Ring, little bell, ringalingaling,
Ring, little bell, ring!
Brightly glow the candles,
Open your hearts to me!
I want to live there happily,
Devout child, how blessed!
Ring, little bell, ringalingaling,
Ring, little bell, ring!

== See also ==
- List of Christmas carols
