= This Endris Night =

Song

Song
- Written: 1400s
- Genre: Christmas carol
- This Endris Night Performed by U.S. Army Band Chorus

"This Endris Night" (also "Thys Endris Night", "Thys Ender Night" or "The Virgin and Child") is a 15th-century English Christmas carol. It has also appeared under various other spellings. Two versions from the 15th-century survive, one republished in Thomas Wright, Songs and Carols Now First Printed, From a Manuscript of the Fifteenth Century (London: The Percy Society, 1847), and the other in the possession of the Advocates' Library in Edinburgh, Scotland, a legal deposit belonging to the Faculty of Advocates, a role which was assumed by the National Library of Scotland from 1925 onwards. All non-legal collections were given to the National Library.

It has been praised for the unusual delicacy and lyrical flourish for a poem of the period. The opening lyrics, in the Wright edition, are:

Thys endris nyȝth
I saw a syȝth,

A stare as bryȝt as day;

And ever among
A mayden song

Lullay, by by, lullay.

== See also ==
- List of Christmas carols
