= Dormi, dormi, bel Bambin =

Italian Christmas carol

Dormi, dormi, bel Bambin
Performed by the U.S. Army Band Chorus

Dormi, dormi, bel Bambin is an Italian Christmas carol. It is particularly popular in Corsica. The carol is supposed to be a cradle song of the Virgin Mary.

== See also ==
- List of Christmas carols
