= Fum, Fum, Fum =

Catalan Christmas carol

- Genre: Christmas carol
- Text: Traditional
- Language: Catalan

Fum, Fum, Fum
A somewhat idiosyncratic arrangement of Fum, Fum, Fum, in Spanish instead of the original Catalan, performed by the U.S. Army Band Chorus.

Fum, Fum, Fum (Catalan: [ˈfum ˈfum ˈfum]) is a traditional Catalan Christmas carol. It was first documented by the folklorist Joaquim Pecanins in 1904, who had heard the song at the Christmas Eve midnight mass in Prats de Lluçanès, Catalonia. However, the song's origins stretch back to the 16th or 17th century, according to folklorist Joan Amades.

In 1922, the musicologist Kurt Schindler first translated the song into English, publishing it in one of the largest musical publishing houses of the era, Oliver Ditson and Company in Boston. Spanish-language versions are also popular today, and it is included in many traditional Spanish Christmas carol collections.

== Meaning ==
Before being written down in the early 20th century, the song was a typical example of a cançó de les mentides (English: "song of lies"), appropriate for the debaucherous way in which Christmas was celebrated in the 18th and 19th centuries. Lyrics were improvised each time it was sung, with each verse more absurd than the last. Some of this survives in the modern Catalan version, which in one verse asks qui dirà més gran mentida? (English: "who will tell a bigger lie?"), while a different verse references shepherds eating eggs and sausage—an explicit reference to fellatio.

Indeed, the ethnomusicologist Jaume Ayats notes that the word "fum" is the imperative form of the verb "fúmer", which in a literal sense means "to fornicate" but can be used as a slang form of saying "to do". In fact, the original song was sung with "fot, fot, fot", from the verb "fotre" instead, a less polite verb with the same meaning. When Pecanins first documented the song, he changed the lyrics to "fum, fum, fum", thought to be more acceptable to a broader audience.

Other sources have suggested a more innocent meaning to the lyrics. Since the word "fum" also means "smoke" in Catalan, it has been suggested the name may simply refer to the smoke rising from a chimney as seen from afar, or, as indicated in the New Oxford Book of Carols, "may imitate the sound of a drum (or perhaps the strumming of a guitar)". Webster's Revised Unabridged Dictionary (1913) defines "fum" as "to play upon a fiddle", quoting Ben Jonson, "Follow me, and fum as you go."

== Lyrics ==
Foreign-language versions typically do not literally translate the original lyrics. For example, the typical English version of the carol, created by Alice Parker and Robert Shaw in 1953, does not take into account the satirical substratum of the original. It was this version that popularized the carol in the United States and other English-speaking areas, though there are several other versions in English as well.

English version

On December five and twenty
fum, fum, fum.
On December five and twenty,
fum, fum fum.
Oh, a child was born this night
So rosy white, so rosy white
Son of Mary, virgin holy
In a stable, mean and lowly,
fum, fum, fum.

On December five and twenty
fum, fum, fum.
On December five and twenty
fum, fum, fum.
Comes a most important day
Let us be gay, let us be gay.
We go first to church and then we
Have the sweetest buns and candy,
fum, fum, fum, fum, fum.

God will send us days of feasting
fum, fum, fum.
God will send us days of feasting
fum, fum, fum.
Both in hot months and in cold
for young and old, for young and old.
We will tell the holy story
Ever singing of his glory,
fum, fum, fum.

Catalan Version

A vint-i-cinc de desembre
fum, fum, fum
A vint-i-cinc de desembre
fum, fum, fum
Ha nascut un minyonet
ros i blanquet, ros i blanquet;
Fill de la Verge Maria,
n'és nat en una establia.
Fum, fum, fum.

Allí dalt de la muntanya
fum, fum, fum
Allí dalt de la muntanya
fum, fum, fum
Si n'hi ha dos pastorets
abrigadets, abrigadets;
amb la pell i la samarra,
menjant ous i botifarra.
Fum, fum, fum.

Qui dirà més gran mentida?
Fum, fum, fum
Qui dirà més gran mentida?
Fum, fum, fum
Ja en respon el majoral
el gran tabal, el gran tabal;
jo en faré deu mil camades
amb un salt totes plegades.
Fum, fum, fum.

A vint-i-cinc de desembre
fum, fum, fum
A vint-i-cinc de desembre
fum, fum, fum
n'és el dia de Nadal,
molt principal, molt principal,
quan n'eixirem de matines,
farem bones escudines.
Fum, fum, fum.

Déu vos do unes santes festes
fum, fum, fum
Déu vos do unes santes festes
fum, fum, fum
amb temps de fred i calor,
i molt millor, i molt millor
fent-ne de Jesús memòria
perquè ens vulgui dalt la glòria.
Fum, fum, fum.

Alternative Catalan version

El vint-i-cinc de desembre
fum, fum, fum
El vint-i-cinc de desembre
fum, fum, fum
Ha nascut un minyonet
ros i blanquet, ros i blanquet;
Fill de la Verge Maria,
si n'és nat en una establia.
Fum, fum, fum.

Aquí dalt de la muntanya
fum, fum, fum
Aquí dalt de la muntanya
fum, fum, fum
N'hi ha dos pastorets
abrigadets, abrigadets;
amb la pell i la samarra,
mengen ous i botifarra.
Fum, fum, fum.

Qui dirà més gran mentida?
Fum, fum, fum
Qui dirà més gran mentida?
Fum, fum, fum
Ja respon el majoral
amb gran cabal, amb gran cabal;
jo faré deu mil camades
amb un salt totes plegades.
Fum, fum, fum.

Translation of Catalan lyrics

On the 25th of December
fum, fum, fum
On the 25th of December
fum, fum, fum
A little boy was born
blond and fair, blond and fair;
Son of the Virgin Mary,
he has been born in a stable.
Fum, fum, fum.

Here atop the mountain
fum, fum, fum
Here atop the mountain
fum, fum, fum
There are two little shepherds
warming themselves, warming themselves;
In their sheepskin and zamarra,
They are eating eggs and sausage.
Fum, fum, fum.

Who will tell a bigger lie?
Fum, fum, fum
Who will tell a bigger lie?
Fum, fum, fum
The majoral responds
very fluidly, very fluidly;
I will take ten thousand strides
all in one jump.
Fum, fum, fum.

On the twenty-fifth of December
Fum, fum, fum
On the twenty-fifth of December
Fum, fum, fum.
it's Christmas Day,
very important, very important,
when we leave the matins,
we'll make good escudines.
Fum, fum, fum

God give you holy holidays
Fum, fum, fum.
God give you holy holidays
Fum, fum, fum.
with cold and hot weather,
and much better, and much better
making Jesus' memory
so that he wants us to glory above.
Fum, fum, fum.

== See also ==
- List of Christmas carols
