= Csordapásztorok =

Hungarian Christmas carol

"Csordapásztorok" ("Shepherds" in English) is one of the oldest Hungarian Christmas carols.

Its lyrics (with the note "old song") can be found in Benedek Szőlősy's book, the Cantus Catholici, which was first published in 1651. Its music was first recorded in the Deák-Szentes manuscript, which was written between 1741 and 1774 by Mózes Szentes.

== Lyrics ==
Csordapásztorok

Csordapásztorok midőn Betlehemben

{{!}}:Csordát őriznek éjjel a mezőben,:|

Isten angyali jövének melléjük,

{{!}}:Nagy félelemmel telék meg ő szívük.:|

Örömet mondok, nagy örömet néktek,

{{!}}:Mert ma született a ti üdvösségtek.:|

Menjetek el csak gyorsan a városba,

{{!}}:Ott találjátok Jézust a jászolba'.:|

Elindulának és el is jutának,

{{!}}:Szűz Máriának jónapot mondának.:|

Isten titeket hozott Uratokhoz.

{{!}}:De nem szólhattok mostan szent Fiamhoz,:|

Mert ő aluszik, nyugoszik pólyában,

{{!}}:Szénán bágyadoz a hideg jászolban.:|

Nem pihen ágyban, sem friss palotában,

{{!}}:Hanem jászolban, romlott istállóban.:|

Serkentsd fel Jézust, szent Fiadat, nékünk,

{{!}}:Mert mi angyalok igéjére jöttünk.:|

Üdvözlégy Jézus, pásztorok Pásztora,

{{!}}:Bűnös emberek megváltó szent Ura.:|

Kérünk Tégedet, mi Üdvözítőnket,

{{!}}:Sok bűneinkért meg ne útálj minket.:|

Mária, Te is könyörögj érettünk,

{{!}}:Hogy halálunkkor boldogok lehessünk.:|

Dicsőség Néked, örök Atyaisten,

{{!}}:Te kisded Jézus és Szentlélekisten.:|

Literal English translation

Shepherds in Bethlehem when

{{!}}:Herd is kept at night in the field,:|

God's angels came to them,

{{!}}:Great fear filled their hearts.:|

I say joy, great joy to you,

{{!}}:Because today your salvation was born.:|

Go quickly into the city,

{{!}}:There you will find Jesus in the manger.:|

So they went and they arrived,

{{!}}:Said good day to Virgin Mary.:|

God guided you to your Lord,

{{!}}:But you can't speak with my holy son now,:|

Because he is asleep, he rests in his swaddle,

{{!}}:Resting on straw, in the cold manger.:|

Does not rest in bed or in refreshing palace,

{{!}}:But in a manger, in a decayed barn.:|

Wake up Jesus, your holy son for us,

{{!}}:Because we guided here by angels.:|

Hail Jesus, Shepherd of Shepherds,

{{!}}:Holy Lord Saviour of sinful people.:|

We ask thee, our Savior,

{{!}}:Do not hate us because of our many sins.:|

Mary, you also pray for us,

{{!}}:For us to be happy when we die:|

Glory to Thee, God the Eternal Father,

{{!}}:The infant Jesus and God the Holy Spirit.:|

== See also ==
- List of Christmas carols
