= Giv mig ej glans, ej guld, ej prakt =

Christmas song by Jean Sibelius (1909) to lyrics by Zacharis Topelius (1887)

- by Jean Sibelius
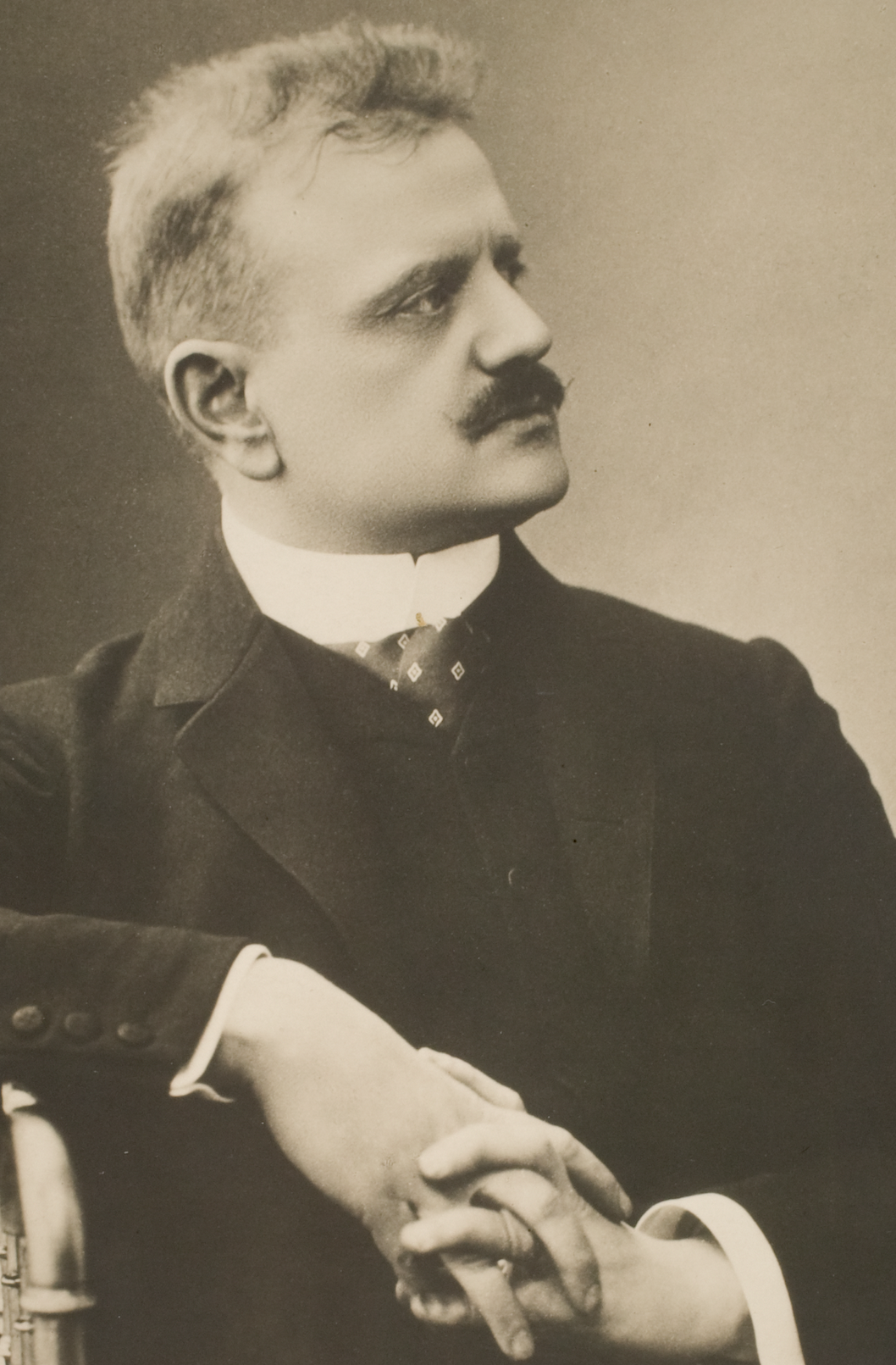
- The composer (c. 1905)
- Other name: "Julvisa"
- Opus: 1/4
- Text: by Zacharias Topelius (1887)
- Language: Swedish
- Composed: 1909, arr. 1935, 1942, 1954

"Giv mig ej glans, ej guld, ej prakt" (in Finnish: "En etsi valtaa, loistoa"; literal English translation: "Give Me No Splendor, Gold or Pomp"), also known simply as "Julvisa" (in English: "Christmas Song"), Op. 1/4, is an art song for vocal soloist and piano written in 1909 by the Finnish composer Jean Sibelius, who set an 1887 Christmas carol by the Finnish poet Zacharias Topelius. Late in his career, Sibelius made several arrangements of "Giv mig ej glans, ej guld, ej prakt": for male choir a cappella in 1935; for voice and female choir a cappella in 1942; for two unaccompanied female voices in 1942; and for children's choir and organ in 1954.

Topelius's poem was originally published in Publicistklubben's magazine Julqvällen ("Christmas Eve"), and appears in the fourth volume of Topelius's Samlade skrifter ("Collected Works").

In Finnish, the song's opening lines are "En etsi valtaa, loistoa" and the song was originally published in Finnish in 1909, probably with lyrics by Martti Korpilahti, and was adopted in the 1986 Finnish hymnal, with lyrics by Niilo Rauhala in 1984. However, the older Finnish language-version had already become popular, and is commonly sung. The song is one of the most popular Christmas carols in Finland.

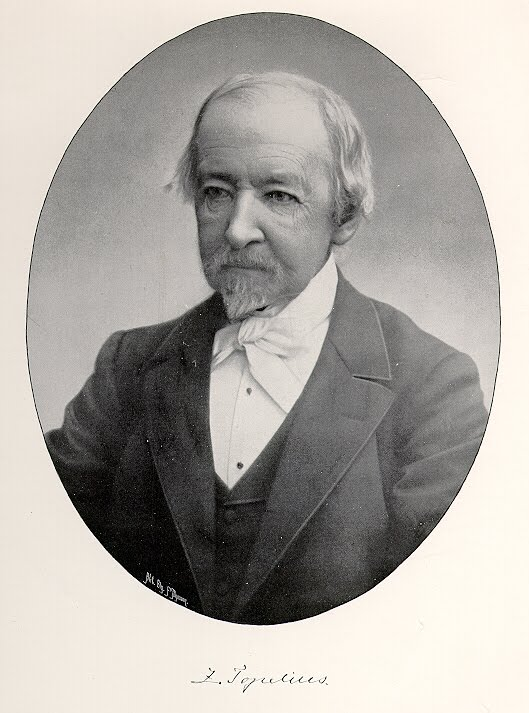
The Finnish poet Zachris Topelius, who wrote the lyrics to "Julvisa" in 1887

== Publication history ==
- Julvisa in Topelius, Zacharias (1889). Sånger. 3, Ljung (in Swedish). Bonnier. p. 232.
- Julvisa in Topelius, Zacharias (1905). Samlade skrifter. D. 4, Sånger, fjärde bandet:1879-1897 (in Swedish). p. 99.
- Finlandssvenska psalmboken as number 510 in the 1923 edition of the 1886 Finnish hymnal version under the heading "Julpsalmer".
- Finlandssvenska psalmboken 1943 as number 28 under the heading "Jul".
- Frälsningsarméns sångbok 1968 as number 591 under the heading "Högtider - Jul".
- Finlandssvenska psalmboken 1986 as number 32 under the heading "Jul".
- 1986 års psalmbok i Sverige as number 645, as a bilingual song in two versions under the heading "From Finland".
- Virsikirja 1986 as number 31 in the section "Joulu" (Christmas).
- Psalmer och Sånger 1987 as number 491 under the heading "Jul".
- Frälsningsarméns sångbok 1990 as number 722 under the heading "Kyrkoårets högtider, Jul".
- Several non-religious songbooks

== See also ==
- List of Christmas carols
