= O Menino está dormindo =

Portuguese traditional Christmas carol from the city of Évora

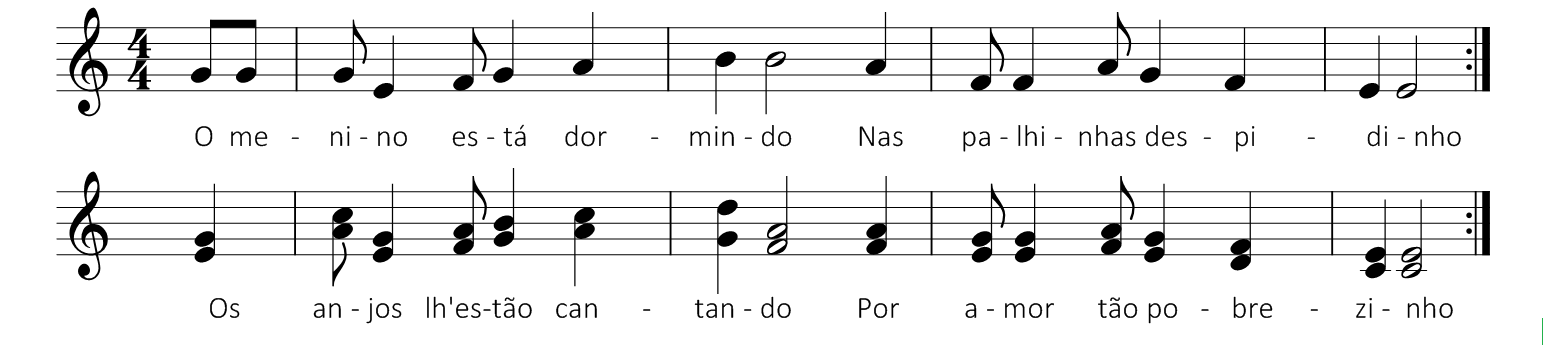

"O Menino está dormindo" (English: "The Infant Jesus Is Sleeping", Portuguese pronunciation: [u mɨˈninwiʃˈta ðuɾˈmĩdu]) is a Portuguese traditional Christmas carol from the city of Évora. The original lyricist and the composer are unknown.

It is dated by Mário de Sampayo Ribeiro to the late 18th or early 19th century.

== Lyrics ==
Lyrics	Translation
O Menino está dormindo, Nas palhinhas deitadinho. Os anjos Lhe estão cantando: «Por amor tão pobrezinho.»	The Infant Jesus is sleeping, Lying naked in the straw. The angels are singing: "He chose to be poor for love."
O Menino está dormindo, Nos braços de São José. Os anjos Lhe estão cantando: «Gloria tibi Domine!»	The Infant Jesus is sleeping, In the arms of Saint Joseph. The angels are singing: "Glory to Thee, O Lord!"
O Menino está dormindo, Nos braços da Virgem pura. Os anjos Lhe estão cantando: «Hosana lá na altura!»	The Infant Jesus is sleeping In the arms of the Virgin pure The angels are singing: "Hosanna in the highest!"
O Menino está dormindo, Um sono muito profundo. Os anjos Lhe estão cantando: «Viva o Salvador do Mundo!»	The Infant Jesus is sleeping, Sleeping very heavily. The angels are singing: "Praise the Saviour of the World!"

== See also ==
- List of Christmas carols
