= Shepherds Arise =

Christmas carol

Shepherds Arise! Be Not Afraid, often known simply as Shepherds Arise, is a Christmas carol first recorded in a 19th-century manuscript from the parish of Winterborne Zelston, Dorset, England. It has Roud number 1207.

== History ==
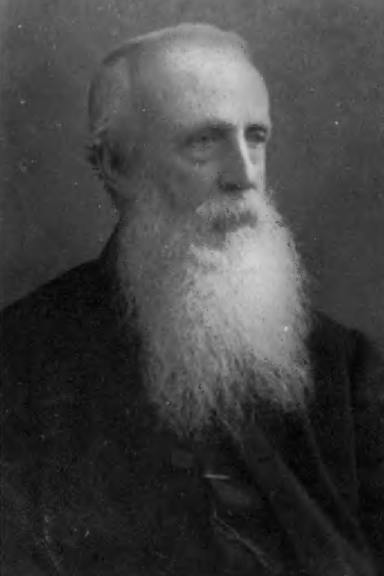
Rev. Octavius Pickard-Cambridge, Rector of Bloxworth, obtained a 19th-century manuscript containing a version of the carol Shepherds Arise.

The carol was first published in a 1926 book, A Collection of Dorset Carols, by William Adair Pickard-Cambridge. Pickard-Cambridge, a classics scholar and talented organist, had obtained several old manuscripts of early 19th century "West gallery music" from his father Octavius Pickard-Cambridge, who had been Rector in the Dorset parish of Bloxworth, near Blandford Forum. The Rev. Pickard-Cambridge had often overseen the "singing of the old Village Carols (and many newer ones)" in the rectory at Christmas. His son had collected additional carol manuscripts from other Dorset parishes where similar carolling traditions survived, the majority being what he referred to as tunes of "Old Methodist" type (a common, if inaccurate, Victorian term for Georgian "West gallery" music, much of which was Anglican). Amongst the collection was an anonymously authored manuscript from Winterborne Zelston, including a version of Shepherds Arise.

While W.A. Pickard-Cambridge, in his printed edition, retained the four-part setting and fuguing elements of Shepherds Arise, he amended or edited some aspects of the tunes recorded in the manuscripts, in particular changing the tenor-led arrangements typical of the "West gallery" era to a more modern soprano-led arrangement. As the original manuscripts were destroyed during World War II Pickard-Cambridge's edition remains the oldest source of this text.

A second version of the carol, with substantially different verses but including a repeated chorus, occurs in an early 19th-century manuscript from Puddletown now held in the Dorset Record Office. In common with much church music of the era, this version includes brief instrumental interludes. A composite arrangement by Woods, using elements of both the Winterborne Zelston and Puddletown versions, has often been used in modern revivals of the carol in Dorset.

== Folk versions ==
The carol gained a wider recognition, particularly in the repertoire of English folk music, through being recorded by Bob and Ron Copper in 1951 for the BBC and on the Copper family's 1971 LP A Song for Every Season. This setting has a number of differences to Pickard-Cambridge's version, notably adding a repeated chorus. The source of this version is unknown, but the Copper family were presumably aware of Pickard-Cambridge's earlier setting through the English Folk Song Society. A. L. Lloyd suggested that both the Dorset version and that sung by the Copper family ultimately derived from an 18th-century hymn book or printed broadsheet, a similar origin to that suggested by Pickard-Cambridge for his carols.

A number of folk musicians and groups such as Waterson–Carthy have since made recordings based on the Copper family's version.

== See also ==
- List of Christmas carols
