= Quelle est cette odeur agréable? =

Traditional French Christmas song

- Christmas carol
- English: What is this perfume so appealing?
- Genre: Christmas carol, French folk
- Language: French

"Quelle est cette odeur agréable?" (What is this perfume so appealing?) is a 17th-century traditional French Christmas carol about the Nativity.

John Gay used the melody of this carol for the song and chorus "Fill ev'ry Glass" in act 2, scene 1, in his 1728 work The Beggar's Opera.

David Willcocks created an arrangement for four-part choir and baritone solo using A.B. Ramsay's 1935 translation "Whence is that goodly fragrance flowing?", adding his own translation for the final verse. Frank Houghton wrote the hymn "Thou who wast rich beyond all splendour" to the melody of this French carol.

== Text ==
French text	English translation by K.W. Simpson	English translation by A.B. Ramsay
Quelle est cette odeur agréable, bergers, qui ravit tous nos sens? S'exhale-t'il rien de semblable au milieu des fleurs du printemps? Quelle est cette odeur agréable, bergers, qui ravit tous nos sens?	What is this fragrance softly stealing? Shepherds! It sets my heart a-stir! Never was sweetness so appealing Never were flowers of spring so fair! What is this fragrance softly stealing? Shepherds! It sets my heart a-stir!	Whence is that goodly fragrance flowing, Stealing our senses all away, never the like did come a-blowing, Shepherds, in flow'ry fields of May, Whence is that goodly fragrance flowing, Stealing our senses all away.
Mais quelle éclatante lumière dans la nuit vient frapper nos yeux l'astre de jour, dans sa carrière, fut-il jamais si radieux! Mais quelle éclatante lumière dans la nuit vient frapper nos yeux	What is this Light around us streaming? Out of the dark – with blinding ray – Purer than Star of Morning's seeming – Showing our path as plain as day! What is this Light around us streaming? Out of the dark – with blinding ray!	What is that light so brilliant, breaking Here in the night across our eyes. Never so bright, the day-star waking, Started to climb the morning skies! What is that light so brilliant, breaking, Here in the night across our eyes.
Voici beaucoup d'autres merveilles! Grand Dieu! qu'entends-je dans les airs? Quelles voix! Jamais nos oreilles n'ont entendu pareils concerts. Voici beaucoup d'autres merveilles! Grand Dieu! qu'entends-je dans les airs?	What is this Wonder all around us Filling the air with Music light! Shepherds! Some Magic here hath found us! Never mine ears knew such delight! What is this Wonder all around us Filling the air with Music light!	
Ne craignez rein, peuple fidèle, écoutez l'ange du Seigneur; il vous annonce une merveille qui va vous combler de bonheur. Ne craignez rein, peuple fidèle Écoutez l'Ange du Seigneur.	'Be not affrighted, Shepherds lowly! Hearken the Angel of the Lord! Bearing a Message glad and Holy – Shedding a radience all abroad! 'Be not affrighted, Shepherds lowly! Hearken the Angel of the Lord!	
À Bethléem, dans une crèche il vient de vous naître — un Sauveur. Allons, que rien ne vous empêche d'adorer votre Rédempteur. À Bethléem, dans une crèche il vient de vous naître — un Sauveur.	There, in a Manger with His Mother, Lieth our Saviour, Born today! Come away Shepherds; Let none other Hinder thy coming now away! There, in a Manger with His Mother, Lieth our Saviour, Born today!	Bethlehem! there in manger lying, Find your Redeemer haste away, Run ye with eager footsteps vieing! Worship the Saviour born today. Bethlehem! there in manger lying, Find your Redeemer haste away.
Dieu tout puissant, gloire éternelle vous soit rendue jusqu'aux cieux. Que la paix soit universelle que la grâce abonde en tous lieux. Dieu tout puissant, gloire éternelle vous soit rendue jusqu'aux cieux.	God in His charity and favour, Give of His grace to all a share! Grace that aboundeth, now and ever, Peace that abideth everywhere! God in His charity and favour, Give of His grace to all a share!	

== Music ==
Source
