= Kalanta Christougenon =

Traditional Greek Christmas carol

Kalanta Christougenon (Greek: Κάλαντα Χριστουγέννων) is a Greek traditional Christmas carol (kalanta) translated into English simply as "Christmas Carol." This carol is commonly abbreviated as Kalanta or Kalanda, some other common titles for this Christmas carol are Καλήν εσπέραν ("good evening") and Χριστός γεννάται ("Christ is born"). This carol is commonly sung around Christmas and accompanied by light percussion instruments such as the triangle and guitar.

Originating in the Byzantine Empire, this Greek traditional Christmas carol gained a large audience beyond Greece through various performances by Nana Mouskouri throughout Europe.

== Lyrics ==
Καλήν εσπέραν άρχοντες (Greek)	Kalanta Christougenon (Greek) – Transliteration	Christmas Carol (English) – Translation
Καλήν εσπέραν άρχοντες, αν είναι ορισμός σας, Χριστού τη Θεία γέννηση, να πω στ' αρχοντικό σας. Χριστός γεννάται σήμερον, εν Βηθλεέμ τη πόλη, οι ουρανοί αγάλλονται, χαίρεται η φύσις όλη. Εν τω σπηλαίω τίκτεται, εν φάτνη των αλόγων, ο βασιλεύς των ουρανών, και ποιητής των όλων. Πλήθος αγγέλων ψάλλουσι, το Δόξα εν υψίστοις, και τούτο άξιον εστί, η των ποιμένων πίστις. Εκ της Περσίας έρχονται τρεις μάγοι με τα δώρα άστρο λαμπρό τους οδηγεί χωρίς να λείψει ώρα. Σ' αυτό το σπίτι που 'ρθαμε, πέτρα να μη ραγίσει κι ο νοικοκύρης του σπιτιού χρόνια πολλά να ζήσει.	Kalin esperan arhontes an ine orismos sas Hristu ti thia genissi na po st' arhontiko sas Hristos gennate simeron en Vithleem ti poli i ourani agalonte herete I fissis oli En to spileo tiktete en fatni ton alogon o vassilefs ton ouranon ke piitis ton olon Plithos agelon psalousi to Doxa en ipsistis ke touton aksion esti I ton pimenon pistis Ek tis Persias erhonte tris magi me ta dora astro lambro tous odigi horis na lipsi I ora S'afto to spiti pou'rthame petra na mi ragisi ki o nikokiris tou spitiou hronia polla na zisi	Good evening noblemen If this is your will, Christ's holy birth May I sing in your noble house Christ is being born today In the town of Bethlehem Heavens rejoice All nature rejoices Inside the cave (He) is being born In a manger for horses The King of the heavens The Creator of everything. A crowd of angels are singing, "Glory in the highest!" And this is holy, The faith of the shepherds. From Persia three magi arrive With their gifts A bright star shows them the way Without any delay. In this house we have come May no stone ever crack And the landlord May live for many years.

== See also ==
- List of Christmas carols
