= The Babe in Bethlem's Manger =

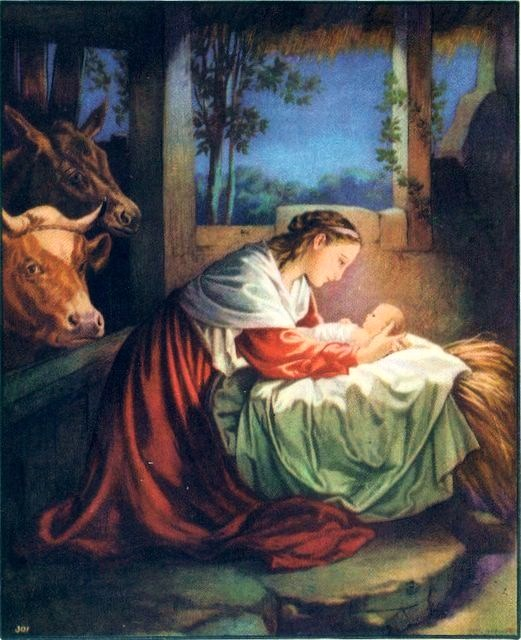
Stylised illustration of the Nativity of Jesus (1925)

"The Babe in Bethlem's Manger", also called "The Babe in Bethlehem's Manger Laid", "Old Kentish Carol" and "The Saviour's Work", is an anonymous English folk Christmas carol celebrating the birth of Jesus in Bethlehem.

== History ==
The writer of the carol is not known. However, the lyrics are traditionally described as being a traditional folk hymn from the English county of Kent. Erik Routley, though, noted that its composition was "very much of the 18th century". It was first published in print in 1871 by the Church of England's Reverend Henry Ramsden Bramley and hymn writer John Stainer in Christmas Carols New and Old. Bramley included the commonly used tune for the carol. Christopher Chope's 1894 Carols for use in Church attributed the words as being Kentish, which was later confirmed by R R Terry in 1923 in his Old Christmas Carols anthology. The carol later passed into North America and was later published in the Evangelical Lutheran Church's Wartburg Hymnal in 1918. In 1960, it was published in the Church of Ireland's The Church Hymnal.

A critical analysis of the hymn notes that the refrain is intended to provoke thought about the difference in people's lives without Jesus and then the later redemption through Jesus.

== Music ==
Several composers have also written music for "The Babe in Bethlem's Manger". In 1964, an optional obbligato for flute was copyrighted in the United States by Theron Kirk. In 1973, in one of his last works before his death, British composer Patrick Hadley wrote a piece of music for the carol so it could be performed in his Lent cantata.

== See also ==
- List of Christmas carols
