= Schneeflöckchen, Weißröckchen =

1869 song with lyrics by Hedwig Haberkern

Schneeflöckchen, Weißröckchen (little snowflake, white little skirt) is a German Christmas carol. The original version comes from Hedwig Haberkern (1837–1901), who published the song in her first book in 1869.

== Lyrics ==
Contemporary (German) version and its English translation

Schneeflöckchen, Weißröckchen,
wann kommst du geschneit?
Du wohnst in den Wolken,
dein Weg ist so weit.

Komm setz dich ans Fenster,
du lieblicher Stern,
malst Blumen und Blätter,
wir haben dich gern.

Schneeflöckchen, du deckst uns
die Blümelein zu,
dann schlafen sie sicher
in himmlischer Ruh’.

Schneeflöckchen, Weißröckchen,
komm zu uns ins Tal.
Dann bau’n wir den Schneemann
und werfen den Ball.

Tiny Snowflake, little whitedress,
when are you coming snowed?
You live in the clouds
your way is so far

Come sit at the window
you lovely star
paint flowers and leaves,
we like you.

Tiny Snowflake, you cover us
the flowers,
then they sleep safely
in heavenly peace.

Tiny Snowflake, white little skirt,
come to us in the valley.
Then we'll build the snowman
and throw the ball

Compared to the original text, which consists of two stanzas, each with eight lines, the text is now usually reproduced in four four-line stanzas. Weißröckchen, a Silesian synonym for snowflake, does not appear in the original version of the text in the opening verse, only in the fourth to last line.

== Melody ==
According to the poet's will, the song should have been sung to the melody of the song "Wir Kinder, wir haben der Freuden so viel" (We children, we have so much of joy). The text of this song by Christian Adolph Overbeck was first published in the Musen-Almanach on the year 1777. Wolfgang Amadeus Mozart set the revised text in 1791 as a song for voice and piano "Das Kinderspiel", KV 598. Another setting had been published by Karl Christian Agthe in 1782. It cannot therefore be said with absolute certainty whether Hedwig Haberkern wanted Mozart's melody for her snowflake song. Since the two known settings are art songs that are melodically and rhythmically more demanding than a simple children's song, it would also be conceivable that Hedwig Haberkern knew another, more folksong melody.

The melody common today, the composer of which is not known, has been documented in song books since 1915. However, in the first half of the 20th century, the song was spread across several different melodies. So it was sung on the melody of "Im Märzen der Bauer" as well as on compositions by Johann André and Kurt Schläger. At the latest after the end of the Second World War, the melody known today prevailed. Occasionally – but only in post-war songbooks – the source is mentioned, that the song was brought by German colonists from Russia or from Courland.

== See also ==
- List of Christmas carols
