= Det kimer nu til julefest =

Danish Christmas carol

"Det kimer nu til julefest" (The Happy Christmas Comes Once More) is a Danish Christmas carol. The lyrics were written by the Danish poet N.F.S. Grundtvig in 1817, and the music was composed by Carl Christian Nicolaj Balle in 1850.

== History ==
Grundtvig wrote the hymn with inspiration from Martin Luther's "Vom Himmel hoch da komm’ Ich her". In 1810, he wrote it as "Fra Himmelen højt komme vi nu her", and in 1817 it was reworked as "Det kimer nu til julefest" with 24 stanzas. It was published in a weekly magazine on 23 December as "Morten Luthers Jule-Psalme. (Frit fordansket"). The current version of the hymn with nine stanzas is the result of several modifications, for instance by Bernhard Severin Ingemann, and was first published in a supplement to the 1877 edition of Fest-Psalmer.

== Music ==
The hymn was most likely written for the tune of "Fra Himlen højt kom budskab her" (Schumann, 1539), but can also be paired with the tune of "Fra Himlen kom en engel klar". The most popular tune was written by the clergyman C. Balle in 1850.

== Publication and recordings ==
The hymn is included in the 19th edition of the Danish Folk High School Songbook, as No. 241, paired with Balle's tune.

Notable recordings have been made by Swedish singer Sven-Olof Sandberg (1905–1974) and Norwegian soloist Olav Werner (1913–1992).

== Adaptations ==
A number of adaptations of the song into English exist. The earliest, entitled "The Bells of Christmas Chime Once More", was translated by Charles P. Krauth in 1867. A later adaptation bore the title "O Fir Tree Dark", and was recorded by Bing Crosby in 1947. Another translation is "The Happy Christmas Comes Once More" by Charles P. Krauth.

== See also ==
- List of Christmas carols
