= The Lord at first did Adam make =

The Lord at first did Adam make, alternatively The Lord at first had Adam made is a traditional English Christmas carol which was collected and first published in 1822 in Davies Gilbert's collection Some Ancient Christmas Carols...Formerly Sung in the West of England. The carol relates the events of Genesis, Chapter 3, relating the evils that have befallen humanity since that first fall and humanity's subsequent redemption; during Advent, a traditional theme is of the birth of Jesus being the coming of the "Second Adam".

The carol was sung in the West Country of England on Christmas Eve. In Davies Gilbert's preface to his 1822 publication, he writes

The following Carols or Christmas Songs were chanted to the Tunes accompanying them, in Churches on Christmas Day, and in private houses on Christmas Eve, throughout the West of England, up to the latter part of the late century ... The Editor is desirous of preserving them in their actual forms, however distorted by false grammar or by obscurities, as specimens of times now passed away, and of religious feelings superseded by others of a different cast.

It was popularised by its inclusion in John Stainer and Henry Ramsden Bramley's Christmas Carols, New and Old of 1877, albeit in a Victorianised non-modal form, with a grammatically corrected text. In this version, the carol was chosen by Edward White Benson to be the opening carol at the original Festival of Nine Lessons and Carols at Truro Cathedral in 1880.

In addition to Gilbert Davies' collected version, another tune also exists and there are numerous textual variations, including additional verses.

== See also ==
- List of Christmas carols
