= A todos um Bom Natal =

1980 Portuguese Christmas song

"A todos um Bom Natal" (Portuguese pronunciation: [ɐ ˈtoðuz ũ ˈbõ nɐˈtal]; English: "Merry Christmas To You All") is a Portuguese Christmas song written in 1980 by César Batalha and Lúcia Carvalho for the Children's Choir of Santo Amaro de Oeiras. It has become a classic Christmas pop song in Portugal.

== See also ==
- List of Christmas carols
