= Freu dich, Erd und Sternenzelt =

German Christmas carol

- German Christmas carol
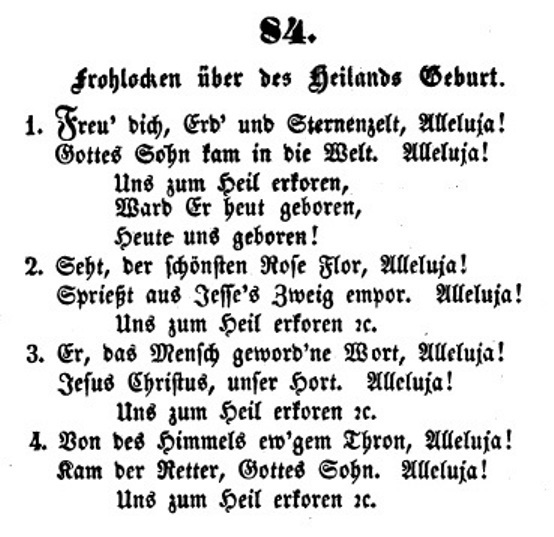
- First print of the German lyrics, Leitmeritz 1844
- English: Be joyful, Earth and canopy of stars
- Language: German
- Based on: "Narodil se Kristus pán"
- Published: 1844

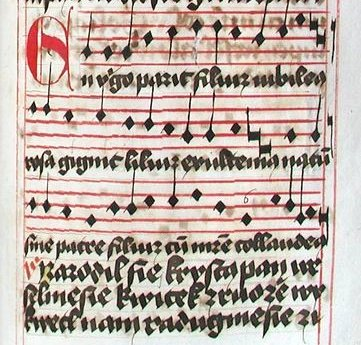
"En virgo parit filium" – "Narodil se Kristus pán", oldest document of the song in Latin and Czech, Gradual held by the Czech Silver Museum, c. 1500

"Freu dich, Erd und Sternenzelt" (Be joyful, Earth and canopy of stars) is a German Christmas carol. The text and melody are based on the Czech carol "Narodil se Kristus pán" (Lord [Jesus] Christ is born), which was derived around 1500 from a Latin model, "En Virgo parit filium", The Czech song is regarded as a popular Czech carol.

== History ==
A German paraphrase in four stanzas with a refrain first appeared in 1844 in the collection by the Diocese of Leitmeritz, Katholische Gesänge für die öffentliche und häusliche Andacht, zunächst zum Gebrauche der Gläubigen der bischöflichen Leitmeritzer Diöcese, for congregational and personal devotion. The song was titled "Frohlocken über des Heilands Geburt" (Rejoicing about the Saviour's birth). The stanzas in seven lines differ only in their first and third lines, while the second and fourth is Halleluja, and the last stanzas are a refrain: "Uns zum Heil erkoren, ward er heut geboren, heute uns geboren." (For our salvation chosen, he was born today, today for us born). The song was included in regional parts of the first edition of the Catholic hymnal Gotteslob in 1975.

The Protestant minister Johannes Pröger in Gauersheim replaced around 1950 two of the stanzas (3 and 4) by lyrics referring to the Annunciation to the shepherds. This version has appeared in the Protestant hymnal Evangelisches Gesangbuch (as EG 47), in the list of ecumenical songs, and in various regional sections of the Gotteslob.

The simple and jolly melody has been varied several times. In the oldest document, it is in a triple metre. The song became a sacred folk song, due to its simple melody and repetitious refrain.

== See also ==
- List of Christmas carols
