= Auf, Christen, singt festliche Lieder =

- German Christmas carol
- English: "O Christians, Come Join in the Singing"
- Text: by August Erthel
- Language: German
- Published: 1778

"Auf, Christen, singt festliche Lieder" is a German Christmas carol. A first text was written in 1778 by August Erthel, which was first published in Fulda (Fuldaer Gesangbuch) with a first melody that year. Heinrich Bone modified the text in 1851 for his hymnal Cantate!. It was sung with different melodies.

It is part of regional sections in the current Catholic hymnal Gotteslob, such as GL 765 in the Roman Catholic Archdiocese of Bamberg and GL 751 in the Diocese of Limburg. It was translated as "O Christians, Come Join in the Singing".

== Text (GL) ==
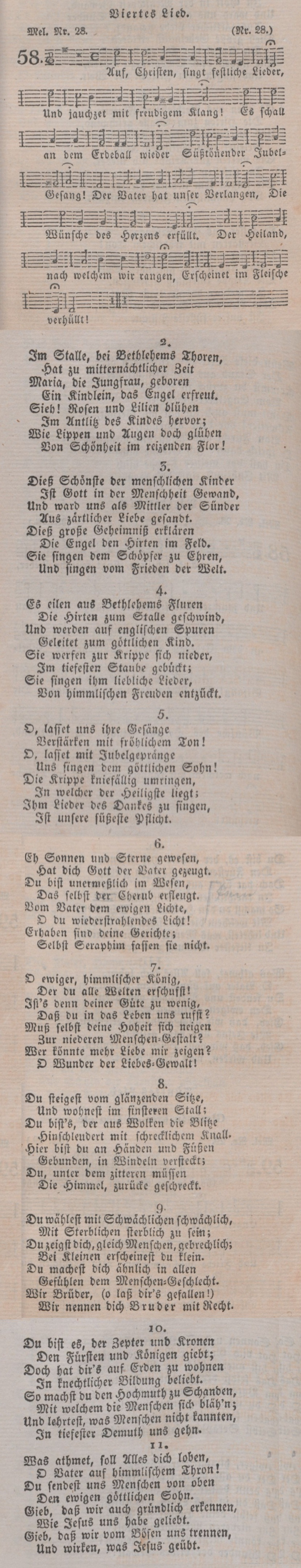
Fuldaer Diözesangesangbuch (1834)

Auf Christen, singt festliche Lieder und jauchzet mit fröhlichem Klang!
Es halle auf Erden laut wider hell tönender Jubelgesang!
Der Vater hat unser Verlangen und seine Verheißung erfüllt
sein Sohn, von Maria empfangen, erscheint uns im Fleische verhüllt.

Im Stalle vor Bethlehems Toren hat liebend zur Mitternachtszeit
Maria, die Jungfrau, geboren, den Heiland, der alle erfreut.
Dies große Geheimnis erklären die Engel den Hirten im Feld,
sie singen dem Heiland zu Ehren, sie singen vom Frieden der Welt.

Oh ewiger, himmlischer Vater, der du alle Welten erschufst,
ist´s denn deiner Liebe zu wenig, dass du in das Leben uns rufst?
Muss selbst deine Gottheit sich neigen zur niedrigen Menschennatur?
Wer könnte mehr Liebe erzeigen, als wie sie der Mensch heut erfuhr?

Was atmet, soll alles dich loben, dich, Vater, am himmlischen Thron!
Du sandtest den Menschen von oben, den eigenen göttlichen Sohn.
So lass uns ihn liebend empfangen, die Herzen ihm öffnen dafür.
Erfüllt ist der Welten Verlangen: Dreifaltiger, Ehre sei Dir!

== Melody ==
Text and melody as used in the Catholic hymnal Sursum Corda of the Archdiocese of Paderborn:

== See also ==
- List of Christmas carols
