= Still, still, still =

Christmas carol from Austria

- Austrian Christmas carol
- Language: German
- Melody: Folk tune
- Published: 1865

"Still, still, still" is an Austrian Christmas carol and lullaby.

The melody is a folk tune from the district of Salzburg. The tune appeared for the first time in 1865 in a folksong collection of Vinzenz Maria Süß (1802–1868), founder of the Salzburg Museum. The words describe the peace of the infant Jesus and his mother as the baby is sung to sleep. They have changed slightly over the years, but the modern Standard German version remains attributed to Georg Götsch (1895–1956). There are various English translations.

== Lyrics ==
Still, still, still, weil 's Kindlein schlafen will.
Maria tut es niedersingen,
ihre keusche Brust darbringen. (Note: Or "ihre große Lieb darbringen")
Still, still, still, weil 's Kindlein schlafen will.

Schlaf, schlaf, schlaf, mein liebes Kindlein, schlaf!
Die Englein tun schön musizieren,
vor dem Kripplein jubilieren.
Schlaf, schlaf, schlaf, mein liebes Kindlein, schlaf!

Groß, groß, groß, die Lieb' ist über groß.
Gott hat den Himmelsthron verlassen
und muss reisen auf den Straßen.
Groß, groß, groß, die Lieb' ist übergroß

Wir, wir, wir, wir rufen all' zu dir.

Still, still, still, He sleeps this night so chill.
The Virgin's tender arms enfolding,
Warm and safe the Child are holding.
Still, still, still, He sleeps this night so chill.

Sleep, sleep, sleep, He lies in slumber deep.
While angel hosts from heav'n come winging,
Sweetest songs of joy are singing.
Sleep, sleep, sleep, He lies in slumber deep.

Great, great, great, love is exceedingly great.
God has left the throne of heaven
and must travel the roads.
Great, great, great, love is exceedingly great.

Up, up, up, you children of Adam!
Fall all at Jesus' feet,
because he atones for our sins!
Up, up, up, you children of Adam!

We, we, we, we all call to you:
Open the kingdom of heaven for us,
when we must die.

We, we, we, we all call to you.[1]
Or "offer their great love"

== See also ==
- List of Christmas carols
