= Carl Christian Nicolaj Balle =

Danish musician

Carl Christian Nicolaj Balle (1806–1855) was a Danish composer and editor of church music; he is noted for his Christmas compositions, including the hymn tune "Det kimer nu til julefest". He was born in Copenhagen, and served as a pastor in Vesterbølle and Nebsager.
