= Sã qui turo zente pleta =

The Interior of the Mosteiro de Santa

"Sã qui turo zente pleta" (English: "All here are black people") is a Portuguese villancico for Christmas. It was composed by an anonymous monk of the Monastery of Santa Cruz circa 1643.

Performers of this song include the Roger Wagner Chorale, Chanticleer, Santa Fe Desert Chorale and The King's Singers.
