= A Virgin Unspotted =

Christmas carol

"A Virgin Unspotted"
"A Virgin Unspotted" performed a cappella.

"A Virgin Unspotted" is a Christmas carol. It originates from 1661, when the oldest known version was written in "New Carolls for this Merry Time of Christmas". It is said to be based on "A Virgin Most Pure", a similar carol. This carol is in a 3/4 rhythm in the verses, but speeds up to a 6/8 rhythm in the chorus.

The song existed in the English folk tradition, where several versions were documented, including one sung by Emily Bishop of Herefordshire which was recorded by Peter Kennedy in 1952 (with audio available via the British Library Sound Archive) and another by a Harold Boucher which can also be heard online.

== See also ==
- List of Christmas carols
