= Narodil se Kristus Pán =

Czech Christmas carol

- Christmas hymn
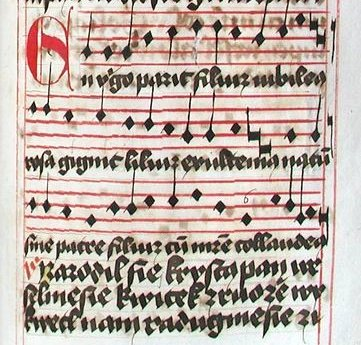
- "En virgo parit filium" – "Narodil se Kristus Pán", oldest document of the song in Latin and Czech in the Gradual held by the Czech Silver Museum, c.before 1500
- English: Be joyful, Earth and starry sky
- Language: Czech

"Narodil se Kristus Pán" (The Lord Christ Was Born), in English version "Be joyful, Earth and starry sky" is a Czech Christmas carol and Christian hymn. The text and melody come from the oldest preserved record of the song in Latin ("En Virgo parit filium") and Czech in the Gradual of the Czech Silver Museum in Kutná Hora, written in the late 15th century, but the song itself is considered to be older. Some historians date it back to the 13th century, while others believe it is originally a Hussite hymn from the first decades of the 15th century. The song is regarded as the most popular Czech carol and it is sung regularly today at the end of catholic Mass and other Christian worship services in the Czech Republic during Christmas time.

The simple and jolly melody has been varied several times, most notably into the German "Freu dich, Erd und Sternenzelt." The Old Czech tune did not contain the tritone (augmented fourth) in the beginning, which can be heard in today's modern editions without exception. In the oldest document, it is in triple metre.

== Latin lyrics ==
En virgo partit filium

En virgo parit filium,
iubilemus,
rosa gignit lilium,
exultemus.
Natum sine patre
filium cum matre
collaudemus.

== Czech lyrics ==
Narodil se Kristus Pán This version comes from the beginning of 15th century and it is usually sung today without 5th and 6th strophe

1) Narodil se Kristus Pán, veselme se,
z růže kvítek vykvet' nám, radujme se!
Z života čistého, z rodu královského,
již nám narodil se.

2) Jenž prorokován jest, veselme se,
ten na svět poslán jest, radujme se!
Z života čistého, z rodu královského,
již nám narodil se.

3) Člověčenství naše, veselme se,
ráčil vzíti na se, radujme se!
Z života čistého, z rodu královského,
již nám narodil se.

4) Goliáš oloupen, veselme se,
člověk jest vykoupen, radujme se!
Z života čistého, z rodu královského,
již nám narodil se.

5) Ó milosti Božská, budiž s námi;
dejž, ať zlost ďábelská nás nemámí.
Pro Syna milého, nám narozeného,
smiluj se nad námi!

6) Dejž dobré skončení, ó Ježíši,
věčné utěšení věrných duší!
Přijď nám k spomožení, zbav nás zatracení
pro své narození.

== See also ==
- List of Christmas carols
