= Angelus ad virginem =

Medieval carol

"Angelus ad virginem" (Latin for "The angel came to the virgin", also known by its English title, "Gabriel, from Heven King Was to the Maide Sende" or "Gabriel fram evene king") is a medieval carol whose text is a poetic version of the Hail Mary and the Annunciation by the archangel Gabriel to the Virgin Mary.

== Background ==
Probably Franciscan in origin, it was brought to Britain by French friars in the 13th century. It is said to have originally consisted of 27 stanzas, with each following stanza beginning with the consecutive letter of the alphabet.

Surviving manuscripts may be found in a c. 1360 Dublin Troper (a music book for use at Mass) and a 13th or 14th century vellum sequentiale that may have been connected with the Church of Addle, Yorkshire. The Arundel 248 manuscript is held in the British Library.

Its lyrics also appear in the works of John Audelay. This is within a group of four Marian poems.

It is also mentioned in Geoffrey Chaucer's "The Miller's Tale" (c. 1390), in which the scholar Nicholas sings it in Latin to the accompaniment of his psaltery.

== Lyrics ==
Angelus ad virginem,
Subintrans in conclave,
Virginis formidinem
Demulcens, inquit "Ave!
Ave, regina virginum:
Coeli terraeque dominum
Concipies et paries intacta
Salutem hominum;
Tu porta coeli facta,
Medela criminum."

"Quomodo conciperem,
Quae virum non cognovi?
Qualiter infringerem,
Quae firma mente vovi?"
"Spiritus sancti gratia
Perficiet haec omnia.
Ne timeas, sed gaudeas
Secura, quod castimonia
Manebit in te pura
Dei potentia."

Ad haec, virgo nobilis
Respondens inquit ei,
"Ancilla sum humilis
Omnipotentis Dei.
Tibi coelesti nuntio,
Tanti secreti conscio,
Consentiens et cupiens videre
Factum quod audio,
Parata sum parere
Dei consilio."

Angelus disparuit
Et statim puellaris
Uterus intumuit
Vi partus salutaris.
Qui, circumdatus utero
Novem mensium numero,
Hinc exiit et iniit conflictum,
Affigens humero
Crucem, qua dedit ictum
Hosti mortifero.

Eia Mater Domini,
Quae pacem reddidisti
Angelis et homini
Cum Christum genuisti!
Tuum exora filium
Ut se nobis propitium
Exhibeat, et deleat peccata,
Praestans auxilium
Vita frui beata
Post hoc exsilium.

The angel came to the Virgin,
entering secretly into her room;
the Virgin's fear
calming, he said, "Hail!
Hail, queen of virgins:
you will conceive the Lord of heaven and earth
and bear him, still a virgin,
to be the salvation of mankind;
you will be made the gate of heaven,
the cure of sins."

"How can I conceive,
When I have never known a man?
How can I transgress
resolutions that I have vowed with a firm mind?"
"The grace of the Holy Spirit
shall do all this.
Do not be afraid, but rejoice
without a care, since your chastity
will remain in you unspoilt
through the power of God."

To this, the noble Virgin,
replying, said to him,
"I am the humble maidservant
of almighty God.
To you, heavenly messenger,
and bearer of such a great secret,
I give my consent, and wishing to see
done what I hear,
I am ready to obey
the will of God."

The angel vanished,
and at once the girl's
womb swelled
with the force of the pregnancy of salvation.
He, protected by the womb
for nine months in number,
left it and began the struggle,
fixing to his shoulder
a cross, with which he dealt the blow
to the deadly Enemy.

Hail, Mother of our Lord,
who brought peace back
to angels and men
when you bore Christ!
Pray your son
that he may show favor to us
and blot out our sins,
giving us help
to enjoy a blessed life
after this exile.

=== Middle English version ===
A 14th middle-English version begins:

Gabriel fram Heven-King / Sent to the Maide sweete,
Broute hir blisful tiding / And fair he gan hir greete:
"Heil be thu, ful of grace aright! / For Godes Son, this Heven Light,
For mannes love / Will man bicome / And take / Fles of thee,
Maide bright, / Manken free for to make / Of sen and devles might."

== Music ==
This is the music of the carol, as it is known today, with the first verse of the Latin words:

== See also ==
- List of Christmas carols

== General and cited references ==
- Free scores of Angelus ad virginem in the Choral Public Domain Library (ChoralWiki)
