= Sing, Choirs of Angels! =

Studio album by Mormon Tabernacle Choir
- Released: 2004
- Recorded: 2004
- Genre: Christmas
- Label: Mormon Tabernacle Choir
- Producer: Mack Wilberg

Sing, Choirs of Angels! is a Christmas album released by Mormon Tabernacle Choir. The album was originally released in 2004. It became the first choir recording to make Billboard Magazine's Top 25 Christian chart.

== Track listing ==
No.	Title	Length
1.	"I Saw Three Ships"	2:53
2.	"Away in a Manger"	4:07
3.	"Shephard's Pipe Carol"	2:58
4.	"Still, Still, Still"	5:48
5.	"The Virgin Mary Had a Baby Boy"	3:25
6.	"Infant Holy, Infant Lowly"	3:46
7.	"O, Green and Shrimmering Tree, Good Day!"	3:17
8.	"What Sweeter Music"	5:10
9.	"Angels' Carol"	3:30
10.	"Fum, Fum, Fum!"	1:29
11.	"Candlelight Carol"	4:41
12.	"Joseph Dearest, Joseph Mine"	4:23
13.	"Silent Night"	4:52
14.	"Oh, Come, All Ye Faithful"	4:35

== Charts ==
Chart (2004)	Peak position
Billboard Holiday	40
Billboard Classical	4
Billboard Independent	26
Billboard Christian	30
