= Es hat sich halt eröffnet =

German Christmas carol

- Christmas carol
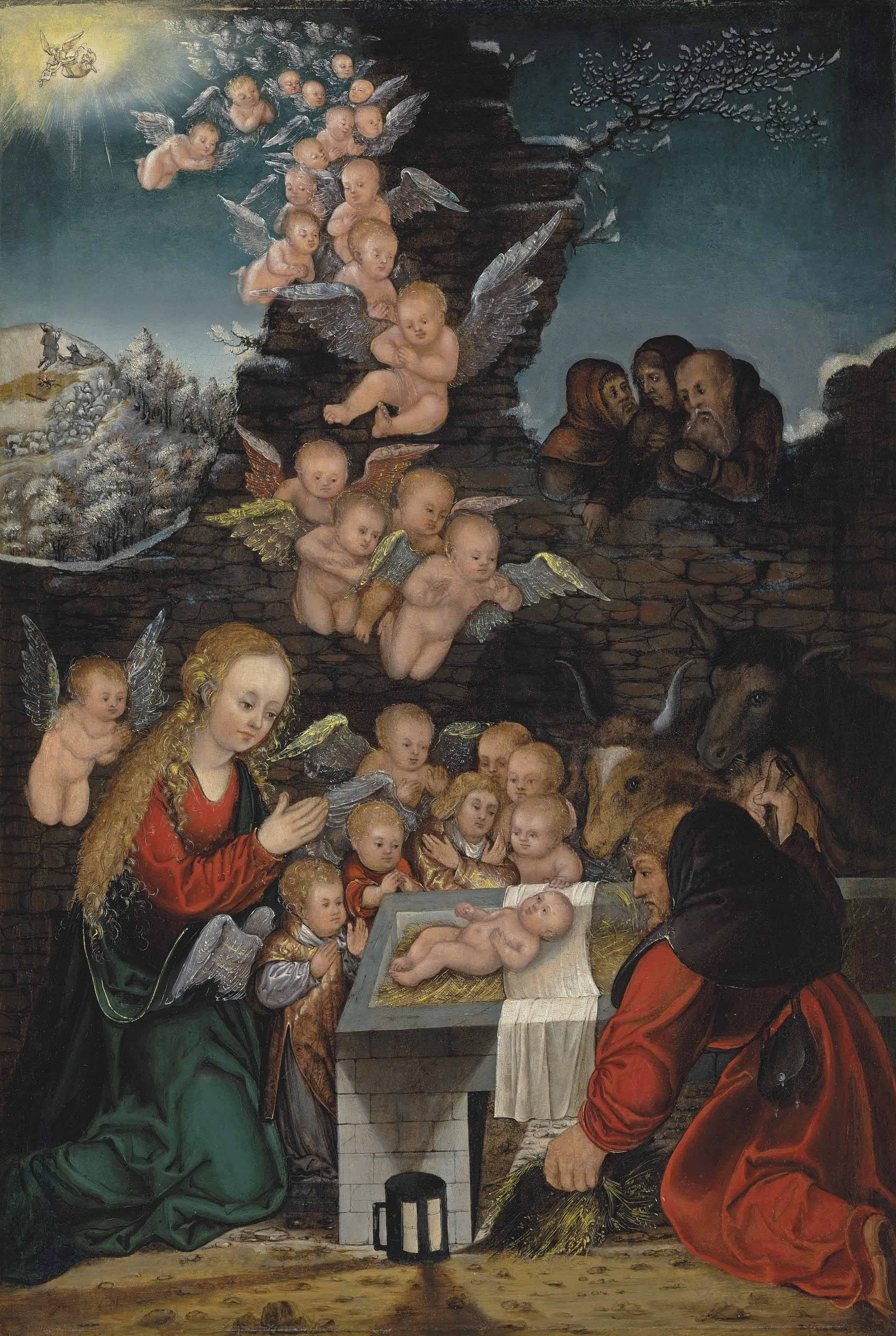
- Nativity, workshop of Lucas Cranach, c. 1520
- English: It just opened
- Language: German
- Published: 1622

"Es hat sich halt eröffnet" is a traditional Christmas carol in dialect German from Tyrol and Styria as well as from Swabia. Its topic is the annunciation to the shepherds from the perspective of shepherd boys. Its beginning, "Es hat sich halt eröffnet das himmlische Tor", translates to "The heavenly gate just opened", followed by an imagination of angel boys and girls coming down, rolling over and enjoying themselves. Further stanzas imagine in direct speech between named boys which food gifts to take to the baby that an angel announced. First documented in 1756, the song is still popular.

== History ==
"Es hat sich halt eröffnet" is a traditional Christmas carol from Tyrol and Styria (now in Austria), and from Swabia (now in Germany). It appeared first as a leaflet in 1756, in a version of 16 stanzas of six lines each. A much shorter version was included in Des Knaben Wunderhorn in 1808. Wilhelm Pailler published a version in 1883, giving as origin "Tyrol, Lienz"; in his version today's first stanza is placed at the end.

A different tradition, which included the melody, has Nauders in Tyrol as place of origin, while a third tradition has the Upper Inn valley in Tyrol. Karl Liebleitner (1858–1942) noted a first stanza in 1898 which was first published in 1899 by Franz Friedrich Kohl in the collection Echte Tiroler Lieder (True Tyrol Songs). The song is also known as the only Christmas carol in Swabian, which is explained by a cultural connection of both regions over centuries, especially by the Swabian children. The song was included in Christmas church services in Tyrol, but the Cecilian Movement criticised it as too secular. In response, a Hallelujah was added to the text.

The song was promoted by the Trapp Family, who recorded it first on their 1953 album Christmas with the Trapp Family Singers. Another arrangement was created by Karl J. Marx (1949).

The song is regarded as one of the most popular Christmas carols in Alpine folk tradition. The title of the song was taken as the title of a collection by the Tiroler Volksmusikverein (Tyrol Folk Music Association) of 20 songs for Advent and Christmas, intended to intensify the experience of Christmas by collective singing. The preface quotes the beginning lines "Es hat sich halt eröffnet das himmlische Tor, die Engelen de kugelen ganz haufenweis hervor, die Büabalen, die Madelen, de machen Purzigagelen" (The heavenly gate has opened. the little angels tumble in large numbers, the little boys, the little girls, they're somersaulting) as an expression of childlike joy.

== Theme and melody ==
The opening of the gate of Heaven, mentioned in the first line, is a topic of Advent that appears in many songs such as "Veni, veni, Emmanuel", "Tauet, Himmel, den Gerechten", "O Heiland, reiß die Himmel auf" and "Lobt Gott, ihr Christen alle gleich". The cheerful song imagines many putti, boys and girls, tumbling from Heaven and rolling over, to proclaim the birth of the Christ Child. Further stanzas have topics from nativity plays, of shepherds who listen to the message, leave their flocks and run to Bethlehem to adore the baby and bring gifts such as apples and nuts.

2) Jetzt håb ma hålt dås himmlische Gwammel erblickt;
es håt uns Gott Våter an Botn zuagschickt.
Wir sollten uns vereinen, zum Kindlein auf die Roas,
verlåssn unsre Öchslan, die Kälber und die Goaß,
verlåssn unsre Öchslan, die Kälber und die Goaß.

3) Åft sein mir nåcher gången, i und du a,
kerzengråd nåch Bethlehem, juchheißa, hopsassa.
Seppele, du Schlanggele, nimm du dei gmöstets Lampele,
und Michl, du a Henn, und Jost, du an Håhn,
und i nimm mei foasts Fakkele und renn damit davon.

4) Geh, Veitl, mir wöllen die Gscheitern hålt sein!
Wir betn ’s Kindlan ån im Ochsenkrippelein.
Büabale, wås mågst denn håbn, mågst eppa dechta unsre Gåbn?
Mågst Äpfl oder Birn, oder Nussn oder Kas,
willst Zwötschgen oder Pflaumen oder sinst a sölles Gfraß?

The song is written from the perspective of shepherd boys who address each others by names such as Seppele, Michl and Veitl. The first stanza begins with their look at a heavenly gate opening and little angels tumbling down, described as little boys and little girls making somersaults, up und down and enjoying themselves. In the second stanzas, the shepherd boys say that they saw the heavenly swarm and a messenger telling them to leave their oxen, calves and goats and go to the little child. In the third stanza, they speak to each other about what to take, such as a lamb and a chicken, and in the fourth stanza, they adore the baby and ask him what he would like from the food they have to offer, mentioning various fruits, nuts and cheese.

== Recordings ==
The song is included in collections of Christmas music, such as a collection Alpenländische Weihnacht (Christmas in the Alps) by the Weinheimer Sängerknaben, conducted by Werner Berberich, opening the sequence. It is on 26 carols recorded by the Wiener Sängerknaben in 1994, recorded in 1994, and part of a 2008 collection of 29 carols, entitled Neubeurer Weihnachtssingen and performed by the Chorgemeinschaft Neubeuern conducted by Enoch zu Guttenberg.
