= Glory to God =

Christmas carol

"Glory to God" is a Christmas carol popular among American and Canadian Reformed churches that have Dutch roots. It is translated from the Dutch "Ere Zij God" and is one of the most beloved carols sung in Protestant churches in the Netherlands.

The lyrics are inspired by the words that the angels sang when the birth of Christ was announced to shepherds in Luke 2:14. The song first appeared in print in 1857 in the hymnal Het nachtegaaltje (The little nightingale), compiled and written by lyricist Isaac Bikkers (1833–1903).

The hymn is thus one of a series that have drawn on that text, including Angels We Have Heard on High, Angels from the Realms of Glory, While Shepherds Watched Their Flocks, and, by far the most ancient, the Greater Doxology or Gloria in Excelsis Deo.

The music is attributed to F.A. Schultz, of whom little is known except for references by others that a Franz Albert Schultz wrote a song book while working at a college in Königsberg in 1731. No copies of this book are extant. The music is grandiose in style, in the A-B-A form, with an extended, flowing double-Amen ending.

== Lyrics ==
Glory to God! Glory to God!
In the highest, in the highest, in the highest!
Peace be on Earth, peace be on Earth
To the people whom God delights in.

Glory to God in the highest, glory to God in the highest!
Peace be on Earth, peace be on Earth, peace be on Earth, peace be on Earth
To the people, to the people whom God delights in,
To the people whom God delights in, whom God delights in.

Glory to God! Glory to God!
In the highest, in the highest, in the highest!
Peace be on Earth, peace be on Earth
To the people whom God delights in.

Amen. Amen.

== Bibliography ==
- Dutch songbook "Kun je nog zingen, zing dan mee!"
