= List of folk song collections =

This is a list of folk song collections including pioneer and notable work in collecting folk songs.

Many such collections were made in the 19th century. The earlier ones are often considered to be parts of the National Romanticist interests in folklore. The monumental efforts of single enthusiasts laid the foundation for the modern academic investigations of epic folk songs. The comments made by various collectors also indicate that they respected and were inspired by the work done by their counterparts. Child's comments show that he indeed could read and understand ballads in Scandinavian languages.

The following table lists comparable pioneering works from different countries or language areas, and corresponding modern scholarly collections or classifications. The 'pioneers' are not necessarily the first collectors, but they were each the first to gain widespread recognition, and to provide classification or at least useful enumeration.

Country/region	Title	Collector	Modern classification
Canada (Ukrainian-Canadians)	Ukrainian-Canadian Folklore and Dialectological Texts	Jaroslav Rudnyckyj	First volume, 1956
China	Anthology of Yuefu Poetry (translated)	Guo Maoqian	Traditional, with some elaboration
Denmark	Danmarks gamle Folkeviser (DgF)	started by S. H. Grundtvig 1853.	The original classification is essentially retained but expanded.
England	Various	Cecil Sharp	The founding father of the British folk revival in England
Faroe Islands	Færøiske kveder	V.U. Hammershaimb	Føroya kvæði. Corpus carminum Færoensium (CCF)
Finland/Karelia	Suomen kansan vanhat runot	Christfried Ganander, Elias Lönnrot and others	The original classification is still in use
France	Chants et chansons populaires de la France	Théophile Marion Dumersan	The original classification is still in use.
Germany	Deutscher Liederhort	Ludwig Erk, Franz Magnus Böhme	Deutsche Volkslieder mit ihren Melodien. Balladen (DVM)
Great Britain, and American variants	Child Ballads	Francis James Child	The original classification is still in use.
Great Britain, Ireland and North America	Roud Folk Song Index	Steve Roud	A database of songs in folk song collections, field recordings and folk song publications.
Iceland	Íslenzk fornkvæði	Jón Sigurdsson, Svend Grundtvig	The original classification is still in use.
India	Pattole Palame	by Nadikerianda Chinnappa 1924.	A collection of Kodava language folk songs, belonging to the district of Kodagu.
Ireland	Songs of the People	Sam Henry	The collection was published in book form in 1990.
Italy:Lombardy	Canti popolari Lombardi	Giulio Ricordi and Leopoldo Pullè	The original classification is still in use.
Italy:Piedmont	Canti popolari del Piemonte	Costantino Nigra	The original classification is still in use.
Italy:Sicily	Canti popolari siciliani	Giuseppe Pitrè	The original classification is still in use.
Netherlands	Het oude Nederlandsche lied (4 volumes, 1903-1908)	Florimond van Duyse	714 historic songs with musical notation
Netherlands	Nederlandse Liederenbank (Dutch Song Database)	Meertens Institute (KNAW)	Scientific database with over 180.000 historic songs (all known versions of a song) (1954 - present)
Norway	Utsyn yver gamall norsk folkevisedikting (1912)	Leiv Heggstad	Ådel Gjøstein Blom, Norske mellomalderballadar (NMB); Visearkivet Oslo CD-ROM uses TSB
Sweden	Svenska folk-visor från forntiden	Erik Gustaf Geijer and Arvid August Afzelius	Sveriges Medeltida Ballader (SMB).

== See also ==
- Roud Folk Song Index
- The Types of the Scandinavian Medieval Ballad

== Bibliography ==
- Marcello Sorce Keller, "The Problem of Classification in Folksong Research: a Short History", Folklore, XCV (1984), no. 1, 100–104.
