= Sei uns willkommen, Herre Christ =

- Christmas hymn
- Language: German
- Published: 1394

"Sei uns willkommen, Herre Christ" is the earliest surviving Christmas hymn in the German language. It originated as a leise and its melody is first recorded as a fragment in the Liuthar Gospels at Aachen Cathedral Treasury, probably dating to the 14th century. The earliest complete surviving version is in a manuscript from Erfurt dating to 1394. August Heinrich Hoffmann von Fallersleben saw the hymn as originating in the 11th century and in 1861 reconstructed a translation from the Erfurt version back into Old High German.

The song welcomes the Lord Christ ("Herre Christ") on earth ("auf Erden") as the Lord of "us all" ("unser aller"). The hymn is also known as the Aachener Weihnachtslied (Aachen Christmas carol) or Aachener Schöffenlied (Aachen juror carol) – according to old Aachen chronicles it was sung from the choir stalls of Aachen Cathedral by the schöffen, appointed honourable citizens involved in general government and jurisdiction, at Midnight Mass on Christmas Eve.

== Melody ==
Sei uns willkommen, Herre Christ appeared in the 1975 Gotteslob, a German Catholic hymnal, as GL 131 with a 14th or 15th century melody from Aachen in modern notation and with the addition of a new second verse from 1970. It is no longer included in the main section of the new Gotteslob, introduced on the first Sunday of Advent in 2013, but the regional section of the Diocese of Limburg includes it as GL 757. The current Protestant hymnal Evangelisches Gesangbuch (EG 22) includes it as a round under the title Nun sei uns willkommen, Herre Christ, with a 1934 canon melody by Walter Rein.

=== Ancient melody ===
Source:

=== Modern melody ===
Source: Gotteslob (1975) nr. 131

== Lyrics ==
In Deutscher Liederhort (1894), Ludwig Erk and Franz Magnus Böhme give two Dutch versions of the lyrics and the following three German versions:

=== First version ===
==== Aachen fragment, 14th or 15th century ====
Syt willekomen, heirre kirst, – Be ye welcome, Lord Christ
want du unser alre herre bis. – May you be our lord of all

==== Erfurt manuscript c. 1394 ====
Sys willekomen heirre kerst, – Be ye welcome, Lord Christ
want du onser alre heirre bis, – May you be our lord of all
sys willekomen, lieve heirre, – Be ye welcome, dear Lord
her in ertrische also schone: – lord on earth thus beautiful
Kirieleys. – Kyrie eleison

=== Second version – Aachen 1825 ===
Nun siet uns willekomen, hero kerst,
Die ihr unser aller hero siet.
Nu siet uns willekomen, lieber hero,
Die ihr in den kirchen schöne siet.
Kyrie-eleyson!

Nun ist gott geboren, unser aller trost,
Der die höllsche pforten mit seinem kreutz aufstoes.
Die mutter hat geheischen maria,
Wie in allen kersten-bucheren geschriben steht.
Kyrie-eleyson!

=== Third version – re-issue by Fallersleben, 1861 ===
Nu sîs uns willekomen hêrro Crist,
du unser aller hero bist!
nu sîs uns willekomen lieber herro,
der du in den kirchen stast scôno.
Kyrieleison.

Nu ist uns geborn unser aller trôst
der die hellischen porten mit sîm kriuze ûfslôz.
diu mueter ist geheizen Marjâ,
also in allen kristen buechen stât.
Kyrieleison.

== Bibliography (in German) ==
- Ludwig Erk, Franz Magnus Böhme (ed.): Deutscher Liederhort. Auswahl der vorzüglicheren Deutschen Volkslieder, nach Wort und Weise aus der Vorzeit und Gegenwart. Band 3. Breitkopf und Härtel, Leipzig 1894 (Nachdruck: Olms, Hildesheim 1988), pp. 625f. (Digitalisat).
- Johannes Janota: Sit willekomen herre kirst. In: Kurt Ruh (Hrsg.): Die deutsche Literatur des Mittelalters. Verfasserlexikon. Band 8. de Gruyter, Berlin 1992, ISBN 3-11-012690-7, Sp. 1287–1288 (Digitalisat).
- Theo Mang, Sunhilt Mang (ed.): Der Liederquell. Noetzel, Wilhelmshaven 2007, ISBN 978-3-7959-0850-8, pp. 1048f.
- Ingeborg Weber-Kellermann: Das Buch der Weihnachtslieder. Schott, Mainz 1982, ISBN 3-7957-2061-3, pp. 9f.
