= The Faithful Hussar =

German folk song

"The Faithful Hussar" (German: "Der treue Husar") is a German song based on a folk song known in various versions since the 19th century. In its current standard form, it is a song from the Cologne Carnival since the 1920s.

== Origin and history ==
A source claims, that in the estate of Caspar Josef Carl von Mylius (1749–1831) a handwritten version of the text from 1781 was found, that Mylius brought from Austria to Cologne. The proof was found after his death in 1831. This version is supposedly the oldest ever. Since this version has not been published, the exact wording and the correspondence with later versions cannot currently be verified.

In 1808 Achim von Arnim and Clemens Brentano in the third volume of their collection Des Knaben Wunderhorn published a version of the text under the title "Die gute Sieben" (The good seven). Achim von Arnim had compiled this text from five different versions, that had been recorded by Bernhard Joseph Docen, Auguste Pattberg, Bettina von Arnim and two unknown senders.

In 1816 Johann Gustav Gottlieb Büsching first published a melody to the song, that has been recorded by Carl Hohnbaum in Franconia, which does not match today's popular tune.

In Münsterische Geschichten (1825) we find a version similar in wording to the now popular one. In 1856 Ludwig Erk in the first edition of his collection Deutscher Liederhort published three different versions of the song. The 1893 version of the same collection compiled by Franz Magnus Böhme contains seven different versions of the text and five different melodies.

In the earliest published versions of the text, the acting person is mostly referred to as Knabe (boy) or Edelknabe (squire). The editors of the Wunderhorn also received two entries referring to a "brave soldier", which were not used for the Wunderhorn version though. Evidence for versions of the text referring to a "hussar" as acting in person date back to the 1880s only: they were recorded in 1880 at Imbden near Dransfeld (Province of Hanover) and in 1885 in Oberlahnkreis (today Limburg-Weilburg) and Kreis Wetzlar.

The folk song collector Elizabeth Marriage points in 1902 to the prevalence of the song and mentions the hero – in their version of the text "a young hussar" – appears "mostly as a fine boy, also young boy, brave soldier, red hussar".

Today's popular version of the song was composed by Cologne Carnival composer and former military bandleader Heinrich Frantzen (1880–1953) as a marching song. Cologne-based music publisher Gustav Gerdes (now part of Hans Gerig publishers) published the song in 1924. The march was allegedly composed on the occasion of establishing the Cologne Carnival society "K.G. Treuer Husar Blau-Gelb" in 1925. Originally, the lyrics taken from the folk song were added only the refrain-like part of the piece. Which version of the text served as the model to Frantzen is not known. The tune does not match any of the melodies published in the 19th century. It is unclear whether Frantzen did cite an existing tune, or whether the march was completely composed by himself. The note in a sheet music issue of original publisher states: "This is the only popular and protected version of the 'Faithful Hussar' with the additional composition by Heinrich Frantzen". Joseph "Jupp" Frantzen, the composer's son, allegedly has added the additional lyrics subsequently.

== Content ==
The ballad is about a soldier or – depending on the version of the text – young boy who is separated from his beloved one, and is only allowed to return to her when she is already mortally ill. While the first verses are largely the same in most versions, there are strong deviations in the later verses. Since nowadays almost always only the first verse – usually in a happy mood drinking – is sung in Germany, the sad love story is usually not perceived.

== Lyrics and melody ==
Es war einmal ein treuer Husar,
Der liebt' sein Mädchen ein ganzes Jahr,
Ein ganzes Jahr und noch viel mehr,
Die Liebe nahm kein Ende mehr.

Der Knab' der fuhr ins fremde Land,
Derweil ward ihm sein Mädchen krank,
Sie ward so krank bis auf den Tod,
Drei Tag, drei Nacht sprach sie kein Wort.

Und als der Knab' die Botschaft kriegt,
Daß sein Herzlieb am Sterben liegt,
Verließ er gleich sein Hab und Gut,
Wollt seh'n, was sein Herzliebchen tut.

Ach Mutter bring' geschwind ein Licht,
Mein Liebchen stirbt, ich seh' es nicht,
Das war fürwahr ein treuer Husar,
Der liebt' sein Mädchen ein ganzes Jahr.

Und als er zum Herzliebchen kam,
Ganz leise gab sie ihm die Hand,
Die ganze Hand und noch viel mehr,
Die Liebe nahm kein Ende mehr.

"Grüß Gott, grüß Gott, Herzliebste mein!
Was machst du hier im Bett allein?"
"Hab dank, hab Dank, mein treuer Knab'!
Mit mir wird's heißen bald: ins Grab!"

"Grüß Gott, grüß Gott, mein feiner Knab.
Mit mir wills gehen ins kühle Grab."
"Ach nein, ach nein, mein liebes Kind,
Dieweil wir so Verliebte sind."

"Ach nein, ach nein, nicht so geschwind,
Dieweil wir zwei Verliebte sind;
Ach nein, ach nein, Herzliebste mein,
Die Lieb und Treu muß länger sein."

Er nahm sie gleich in seinen Arm,
Da war sie kalt und nimmer warm;
"Geschwind, geschwind bringt mir ein Licht!
Sonst stirbt mein Schatz, daß's niemand sicht."

Und als das Mägdlein gestorben war,
Da legt er's auf die Totenbahr.
Wo krieg ich nun sechs junge Knab'n,
Die mein Herzlieb zu Grabe trag'n?

Wo kriegen wir sechs Träger her?
Sechs Bauernbuben die sind so schwer.
Sechs brave Husaren müssen es sein,
Die tragen mein Herzliebchen heim.

Jetzt muß ich tragen ein schwarzes Kleid,
Das ist für mich ein großes Leid,
Ein großes Leid und noch viel mehr,
Die Trauer nimmt kein Ende mehr.

A faithful soldier, without fear,
He loved his girl for one whole year,
For one whole year and longer yet,
His love for her, he'd ne'er forget.

This youth to foreign land did roam,
While his true love, fell ill at home.
Sick unto death, she no one heard.
Three days and nights she spoke no word.

And when the youth received the news,
That his dear love, her life may lose,
He left his place and all he had,
To see his love, went this young lad...

Oh mother, bring forth a light,
My darling dies, I do not see,
That was indeed a faithful hussar,
He loves his girl a whole year.

And when he came to his darling,
Very softly, she gave him her hand,
The whole hand and much more,
Love never came to an end.

"Greetings, greetings, my dearest!
What are you doing alone in bed?"
"Thanks, thanks, my faithful lad!
With me it will soon be in the grave."

"Greetings, greetings, my fine boy.
Let me go to the cool grave."
"Oh no, oh no, my dear child,
Because we are so in love. "

"Oh no, oh no, not so fast,
Because we are two lovers;
Oh no, oh no, my heart tells me,
The love and faith must last longer."

He took her in his arms to hold,
She was not warm, forever cold.
"Oh quick, oh quick, bring light to me,
Else my love dies, no one will see."

And when the maid had died,
He puts on the funeral bier.
Where do I get six young boys,
To carry my dear to the grave?

Pallbearers we need two times three,
Six farmhands they are so heavy.
It must be six of soldiers brave,
To carry my love to her grave.

A long black coat, I must now wear.
A sorrow great, is what I bear.
A sorrow great and so much more,
My grief it will end nevermore.

== Popular culture ==
Recordings by British artists Ted Heath and Vera Lynn (as "Don't Cry My Love") both reached the Billboard Top 100. Lynn's rendition also reached #29 in the UK. American artists such as Louis Armstrong also played the piece. Armstrong's version reached #27 in the UK charts in 1956.
