= There's a Hole in My Bucket =

Classic, humorous children's song

"There's a Hole in My Bucket" (or "...in the Bucket") is a children's folk song based on a protracted humorous dialogue between two characters about a leaky bucket. The song is believed to have originated in Germany by the 1700s, and was well-known in England and the United States by the 1930s.

The characters are typically a man (often named Henry or Georgie (Note: The name of the male questioner varies depending on the source. School music books from the 1960s and modern published works often use the name Johnny.)) and a woman named Liza. Various versions exist but they differ only slightly, all describing a complicated situation essentially as follows: Henry's bucket leaks, so Liza tells him to repair it. To fix the leaky bucket, he needs straw. To cut the straw, he needs a knife. To use the knife, he needs to sharpen it. If the sharpening stone must be damp, he needs water. But to fetch water, he needs the bucket which has a hole in it.

To commemorate the song, the National Day Calendar organization in Mandan, North Dakota, United States denotes May 30 every year is "Hole in My Bucket Day".

== Melody and lyrics ==
There's a hole in my bucket, dear Liza, dear Liza,
There's a hole in my bucket, dear Liza, a hole.

Then mend it, dear Henry, dear Henry, dear Henry,
Then mend it, dear Henry, dear Henry, mend it.

With what shall I mend it, dear Liza, dear Liza?
With what shall I mend it, dear Liza, with what?

With straw, dear Henry, dear Henry, dear Henry,
With straw, dear Henry, dear Henry, with straw.

The straw is too long, dear Liza, dear Liza,
The straw is too long, dear Liza, too long.

Then cut it, dear Henry, dear Henry, dear Henry,
Then cut it, dear Henry, dear Henry, cut it.

With what shall I cut it, dear Liza, dear Liza?
With what shall I cut it, dear Liza, with what?

With a knife, dear Henry, dear Henry, dear Henry,
With a knife, dear Henry, dear Henry, a knife.

The knife is too dull, dear Liza, dear Liza,
The knife is too dull, dear Liza, too dull.

Then sharpen it, dear Henry, dear Henry, dear Henry,
Then sharpen it, dear Henry, dear Henry, sharpen it.

With what shall I sharpen it, dear Liza, dear Liza?
With what shall I sharpen it, dear Liza, with what?

With a stone, dear Henry, dear Henry, dear Henry,
With a stone, dear Henry, dear Henry, a stone.

The stone is too dry, dear Liza, dear Liza,
The stone is too dry, dear Liza, too dry.

Then wet it, dear Henry, dear Henry, dear Henry,
Then wet it, dear Henry, dear Henry, wet it.

With what shall I wet it, dear Liza, dear Liza?
With what shall I wet it, dear Liza, with what?

With water, dear Henry, dear Henry, dear Henry,
With water, dear Henry, dear Henry, with water.

In what shall I fetch it, dear Liza, dear Liza?
In what shall I fetch it, dear Liza, in what?

In a bucket, dear Henry, dear Henry, dear Henry,
In a bucket, dear Henry, dear Henry, in a bucket.

But there's a hole in my bucket, dear Liza, dear Liza,
There's a hole in my bucket, dear Liza, a hole.

== Origins and development ==
The earliest known archetype of this song seems to be in the German collection of songs Bergliederbüchlein (c 1700). It is set as a dialogue between a woman named Liese, and an unnamed man.

Wenn der Beltz em Loch hat –
stop es zu meine liebe Liese
Womit soll ich es zustopfen –
mit Stroh, meine liebe Liese.

When the jug has a hole –
stop it up my dear Liese
With what shall I stop it –
with straw my dear Liese.

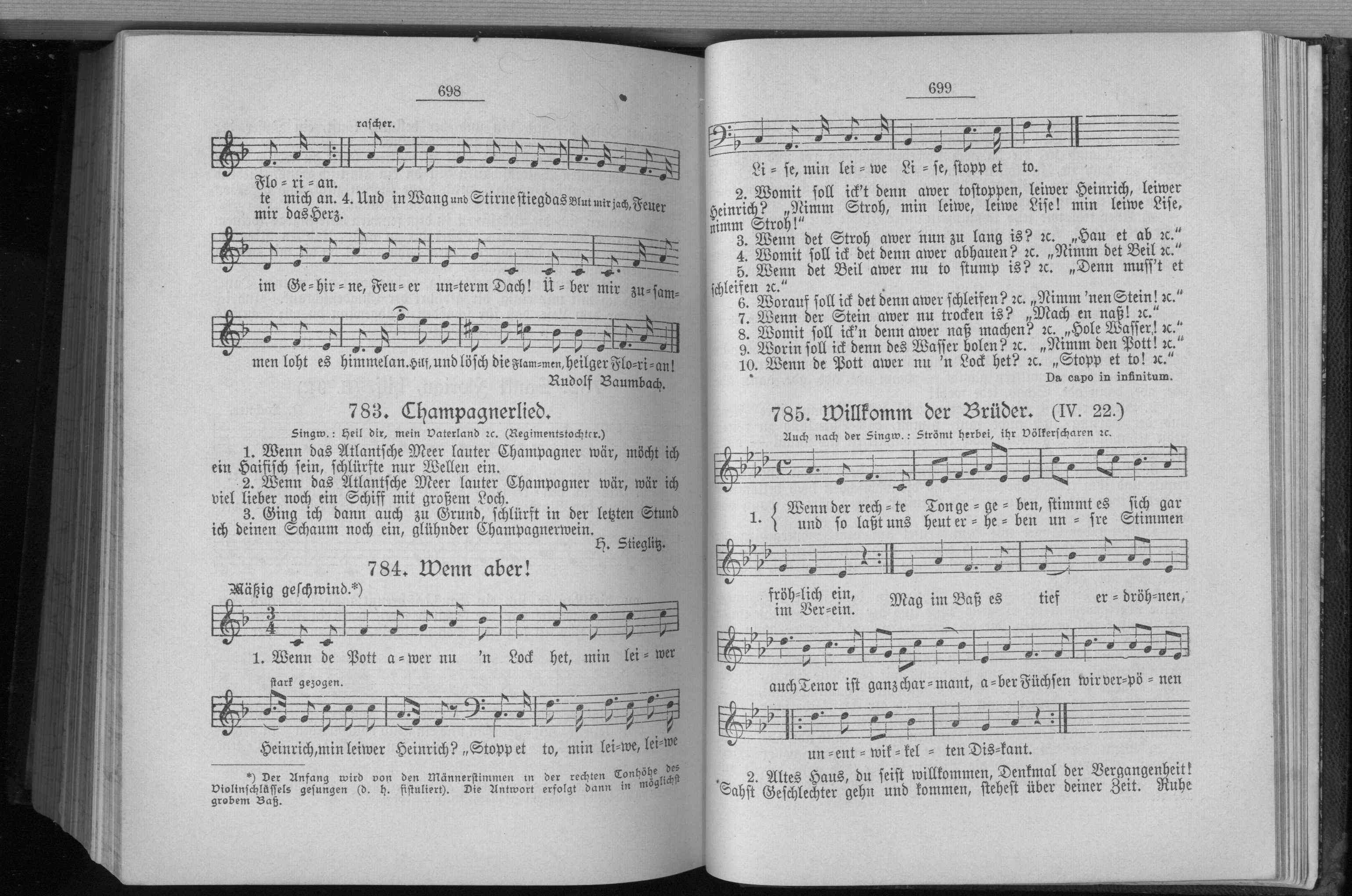
Version in the Kommersbuch

In later German sources the song is reproduced under the title of "Heinrich und Liese" and credited as a folk song from Hesse. In the 19th century it was sung as a commercium song and printed in the 1858 Allgemeines Deutsches Kommersbuch. The song collection Deutscher Liederhort (3 volumes, 1856–1894), edited by Ludwig Erk and Franz Magnus Böhme, includes the song, relating it to the Flemish song "Mooy Bernardyn – Wat doet gy in het groene veld?". The German song became even more widespread when it was included in the Wandervogel songbook Der Zupfgeigenhansl in 1909.

In George Korson's Pennsylvania Songs and Legends (1949) there is a song with meter closer to the modern English version and beginning thus:

Wann der Tschock awer en Loch hot
Liewer Georgie Liewer Georgie,
Wann der Tschock awer en Loch hot?
Dummer Ding, dann schtopp'n zu!

When the jug has a hole
Dear Georgie, dear Georgie
When the jug has a hole?
Stupid thing, then stop it up!

This was collected in 1940, and is earlier than any known English-language version. This suggests that it might be a traditional "Pennsylvania Dutch" (i.e. German) song. Ed McCurdy recorded it in 1958 on "Children's Songs". Harry Belafonte recorded it with Odetta in 1960. It reached No. 32 in the UK Singles Chart in September 1961. In his book Where Have All the Flowers Gone: A Singer's Songs, Stories, Seeds, Robberies (1993), Pete Seeger refers to it as an originally German song, "Lieber Heinrich". Songs Along the Mahantongo: Pennsylvania Dutch Folksongs (1951), by Boyer, Buffington, & Yoder, has a version

Was soll ich koche, liewer Hei,
Liewer Heinrich, liewer Heinrich?
Was soll ich koche, liewer Heinrich,
Was dann?

What should I cook, dear Henry,
Dear Henry, dear Henry?
What should I cook, dear Henry,
What then?

These versions all have Henry as the foolish questioner and Liza as the common-sense woman.

== Further adaptations ==
An English version of the song existed by 1937, when it was quoted in the novel Starting Point by Cecil Day-Lewis.

There's a hole in my bucket, Sister Liza, Sister Liza!
There's a hole in my bucket, Sister Liza, a hole!

In 1953, Flanders and Swann wrote a parody named "There's a Hole in My Budget" satirising the British budget deficit, substituting the Prime Minister Winston Churchill and Chancellor Rab Butler for Henry and Liza, respectively. They rerecorded it in 1974, updating the characters to Harold Wilson and Denis Healey.

A Hebrew version (יש חור בדלי / "There is a hole in the bucket") was written by Israeli songwriter Dan Almagor and was recorded in 1961, sung by Yossi Banai and Yona Atari.

In a 1966 episode of The Dean Martin Show, Dean Martin and George Gobel sang a version of the song on television. It was also performed by Jim Henson as Henry and Rita Moreno as Liza for a 1976 episode of Sesame Street.

Czech lyrics were written by M. Bukovič, who stayed true to the English lyrics of the song and only translated it (using the names Lojza and Líza as his title) while keeping the rhyme. It was first sung by the band Fešáci in 1977 by their front man Michal Tučný.

Chumbawamba included a version of one verse of this song titled "Knickers" in their 2000 album WYSIWYG.

The first lines are sung by a Hybrid being in the science-fiction TV series Battlestar Galactica, in the 2009 episode "Islanded in a Stream of Stars." It is a reference to an eternal, unresolvable cycle, an infinite loop, which is relevant to the show's themes.

In the lead up to the 2022 Australian federal election, a version of the song was used by the Liberal Party of Australia in a campaign ad to attack the Australian Labor Party over their alleged deficits and paying for them with new taxes while in government. The advertisement was widely ridiculed as ineffective.

== See also ==
- Bucket (song)
