= Das Todaustreiben =

German folksong

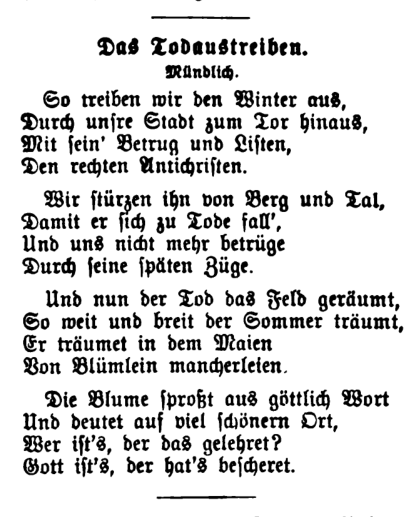
- The text of the song in the 1906 edition of Des Knaben Wunderhorn

Song
- Language: German
- English title: Driving out Death
- Published: not later than 1570
- Genre: Folk
- Songwriter: Traditional

"Das Todaustreiben" ("Driving out Death") or "Das Winteraustreiben" ("Driving out Winter") is an old German song associated with the folk custom of Todaustragen, which celebrated the death of winter and the rebirth of spring. In the 16th century a version of the song was rewritten as a Protestant attack on the Pope.

== History ==
A folksong associated with the Lenten tradition of the driving out of winter existed in Germany as early as the first half of the 16th century, when it was used as the model for a Protestant antipapal parody, which began with the words So treiben wir den Papst heraus / Aus Christus Kirche und Gottes Haus ("Thus we drive the Pope out / from Christ's church and God's house"). This version of the song was first published as a Liedblatt-Druck (a single-sheet printed broadside) in 1545, with a four-part musical setting. A slightly modernized text was included in the Deutscher Liederhort, edited by Ludwig Erk and Franz Magnus Böhme in 1893–1894. The parody was traditionally attributed to Martin Luther himself and included among his works, but more recent scholarship suggests that the author was probably Johannes Mathesius, who brought the song to Luther's attention in April 1545; Luther then arranged for its publication, with some additions and alterations to strengthen the attack on the Pope, whom the song equates with the Antichrist.

The original folk version of the song, in which winter rather than the Pope was driven out, does not seem to have appeared in print until several decades later. A text from 1584 was printed by Franz Magnus Böhme in his Altdeutsches Liederbuch of 1877 under the title "Winteraustreiben", and reprinted in the Deutscher Liederhort in 1894. (The version quoted below is from the Deutscher Liederhort).

So treiben wir den Winter aus,
Durch unsre Stadt zum Thor hinaus
Mit sein Betrug und Listen,
den rechten Antichristen.

Wir stürzen ihn von Berg zu Tal,
Damit er sich zu Tode fall,
Und uns nicht mehr belüge
Durch falsche Lehr und Lüge.

Nun haben den Winter wir ausgetrieben,
So bringen wir den Sommer herwieder,
Den Sommer und den Maien,
Die Blümlein mancherleien.

Die Blümlein sind das göttlich Wort,
Das blüht itzunder an manchem Ort,
Das wird uns rein geleret:
Gott ist's, der's hat bescheret.

Das danken Gott von Herzen wir,
Bitten, daß er wollt senden schier
Christum, uns zu erlösen
Vom Winter und allem Bösen.

Thus, we drive the winter out,
Through our city and out the gate,
With his deceit and cunning,
The real Antichrist.

We cast him down from mountain to valley,
So that he falls to his death,
And may deceive us no more
With his false teaching and lies

And now we have driven the Winter out,
So let us bring the Summer back,
The Summer and May,
The little flowers of many kinds.

The little flowers are the divine word,
That blooms now in many places;
Who is it, who orders this?
God it is, who has granted it.

For this we thank God from our hearts
in prayer, that he was willing to send soon
Christ to deliver us
from winter and all evil.

Although drawing on older, traditional material, this version of the text has been adapted to make it more overtly Protestant; in his study of the sources of Des Knaben Wunderhorn, Ferdinand Rieser described it as a Prostestant song of faith and a spiritual reworking of the folk tradition. The editors of the Deutscher Liederhort judged only the opening lines of the first two stanzas and the third stanza to be of genuinely folk character. In particular, the allusions to the Antichrist and to falsche Lehr und Lüge ("false teaching and lies") were probably influenced by the Lutheran parody, since they are characteristic of Protestant attacks on the Pope, but make much less sense when applied to the season of winter.

In a 17th-century version recorded in Balthasar Schnurr's Art-, Haus-, und Wunderbuch (1676), death replaces winter in the first line. This version was sung by children as part of the Silesian celebration of Todsonntag on the last Sunday of Lent:

Nun treiben wir den Tod hinaus,
Dem alten Jöden in den Bauch,
Dem jungen in den Rücken;
Das ist sein Ungelücke.

Wir treiben ihn über Berg und Thal,
Daß er nicht wiederkommen sol,
Wir treiben ihn über die Heide;
Das thun wir den Schäfern zuleide.

Nun haben wir den Tod hinaus getreiben
Und bringen den lieben Sommer wieder,
Den Sommer und auch den Meyen,
Der Blümelein sind mancherleyen.

Now we drive Death out,
Into the belly of the old Jew,
Onto the back of the young Jew;
That is his misfortune.

We drive him over mountain and valley,
So that he will never come back,
We drive him over the heath;
This harm we do to the shepherds.

Now we have driven Death out
And brought the dear Summer back,
The Summer and also May,
Whose little flowers are of many kinds.

In 1806 Achim von Arnim and Clemens Brentano included another version of the song, under the title "Todaustreiben", in the first volume of their collection of old German songs and poems, Des Knaben Wunderhorn. Because of the popularity of their work, this has become the most widely known version. (The text quoted below is from the centennial edition of 1906, edited by Eduard Grisebach, with minor changes in spelling and punctuation from the first edition.)

So treiben wir den Winter aus,
Durch unsre Stadt zum Tor hinaus,
Mit sein Betrug und Listen,
Den rechten Antichristen.

Wir stürzen ihn von Berg und Tal,
Damit er sich zu Tode fall',
Und uns nicht mehr betrüge
Durch seine späten Züge.

Und nun der Tod das Feld geräumt,
So weit und breit der Sommer träumt,
Er träumet in dem Maien
Von Blümlein mancherleien.

Die Blume sproßt aus göttlich Wort
Und deutet auf viel schönern Ort,
Wer ist's, der das gelehret?
Gott ist's, der hat's bescheret.

Thus, we drive the winter out,
Through our city and out the gate,
With his deceit and cunning,
The real Antichrist.

We cast him down him from mountain and valley,
So that he falls to his death,
And may deceive us no more
With his late gusts.

And now Death leaves the field,
So far and wide the Summer dreams,
He dreams in May
Of little flowers of many kinds.

The flower sprouts through the divine word
And points to a much more beautiful place.
Who is it, who orders this?
God it is, who has granted it.

== Christian and pagan traditions ==
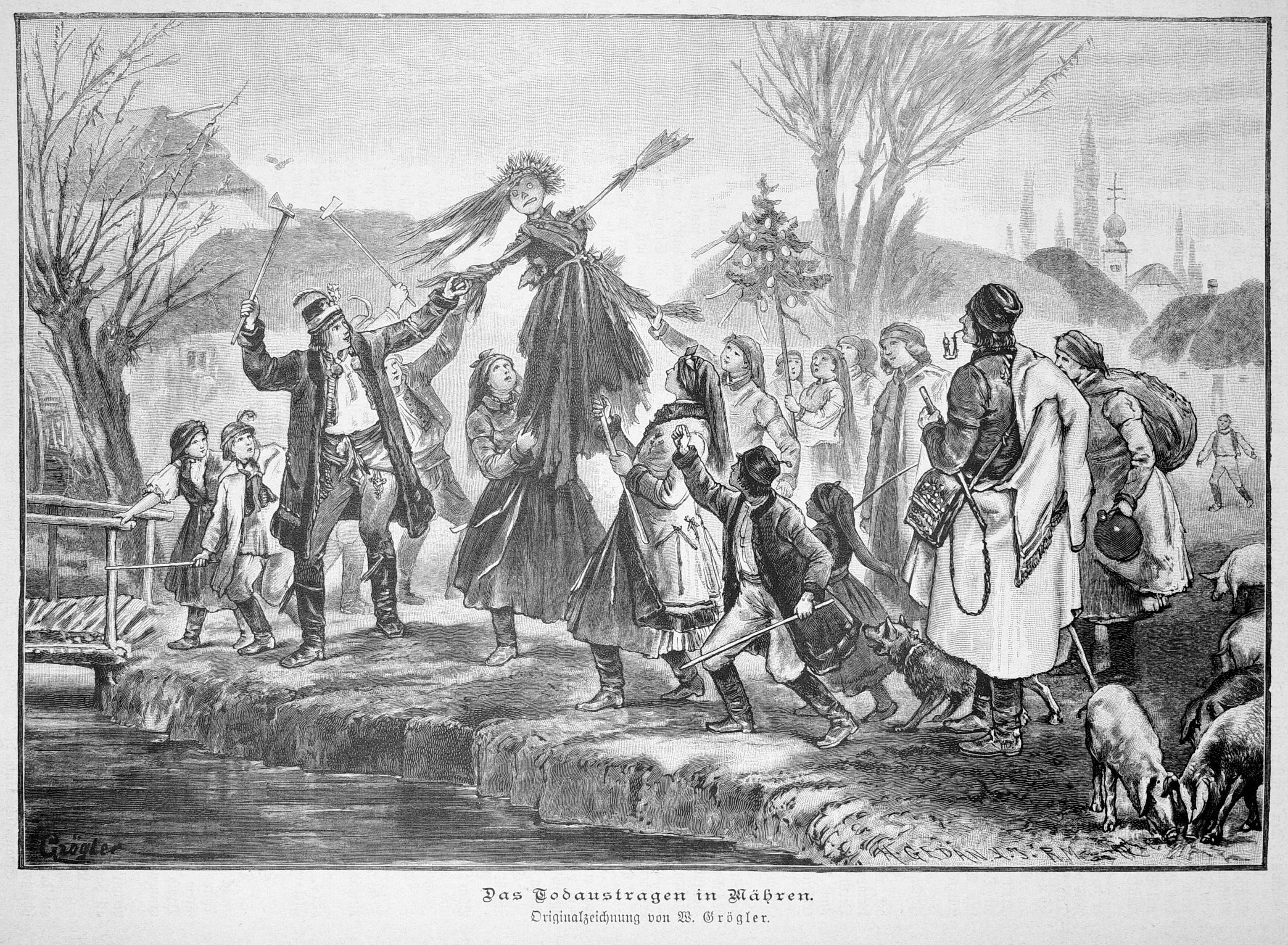
The folk custom of Driving out Death in Moravia

The song is based on an old pagan custom of Driving out Death. This custom has long been traditional in many parts of Germany (such as Silesia, Thuringia, Franconia). Christians considered death to be the Antichrist, who was to be banished, to free the way for the Saviour. This custom of Driving out Death (also known as Driving out Winter) represented the struggle against Winter and the subsequent awakening of Earth in Spring.
