= Resonet in laudibus =

14th-century carol

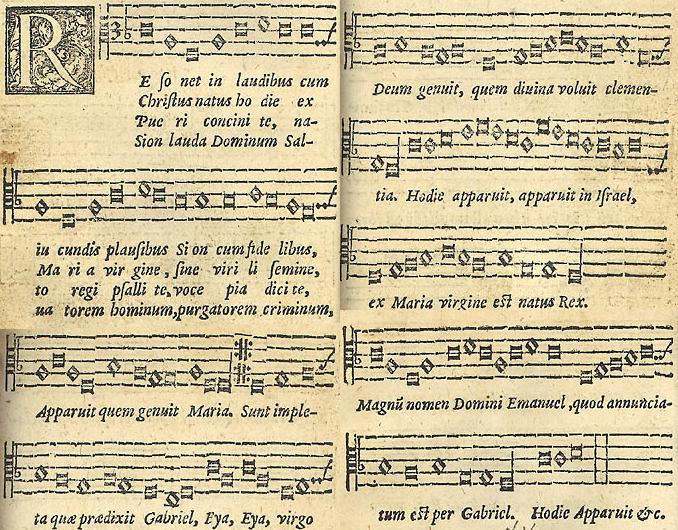
"Resonet in laudibus" in the 1582 Swedish songbook Piae Cantiones

"Resonet in laudibus" (Latin for "Resound in praises") is a 14th-century Christmas carol which was widely known in medieval Europe, and is still performed today. Although probably earlier, in manuscript form it first appears in the Moosburg gradual of 1360 and occurs in several 15th, 16th and 17th century printed collections from both Catholic and Lutheran traditions.

Orlande de Lassus's motet based on "Resonet in laudibus"

There is no definitive version of the Latin text, and there are many variations and parodies in various sacred songbooks, as well as extended, embellished versions (for example motets by the Franco-Flemish composer Orlande de Lassus or the Slovenian-German composer Jacobus Gallus). Georg Witzel, a contemporary of Martin Luther, referred to the carol as "one of the chief Christmas songs of joy" in 1550. In addition to its literal English translation, it has also appeared as "Christ was Born on Christmas Day" in two different translations by John Mason Neale in 1853 (who based his version on the 1582 Swedish song collection Piae Cantiones) and Elizabeth Poston in 1965.

In Germany, the melody is used for the traditional song "Joseph, lieber Joseph mein" ("Joseph dearest, Joseph mine"), originally sung as a lullaby by the Virgin Mary in a 16th-century mystery play in Leipzig (and doubtfully credited to Johannes Galliculus). The Lutheran poet and composer Johann Walter wrote one of his finest motets using this song. Sir David Willcocks' arrangement in Carols for Choirs 2 titles the work "Resonemus laudibus".

== Tune ==
Source: Erk, Ludwig; Böhme, Franz Magnus, eds. (1894). Deutscher Liederhort. Vol. 3. Leipzig. pp. 642–643.

== See also ==
- List of Christmas carols
