= Sveriges Medeltida Ballader =

Sveriges Medeltida Ballader (SMB) is a scholarly edition which compiles, in principle, all of the known Swedish medieval (traditional) ballads in existence, including those from Swedish-speaking parts of Finland. The collection was published between 1983 and 2001 by the Svenskt visarkiv, and edited by Bengt R. Jonsson, Margareta Jersild and Sven-Bertil Jansson.

The ballads are cross referenced to the corresponding TSB number (The Types of the Scandinavian Medieval Ballad). Not only that, the SMB numbers were assigned in the order of ascending TSB type numbers, i.e., SMB 1 was assigned to TSB A 4, ending with SMB 260 assigned to F 75, at the point in time when 260 ballad types were recognized in the collection. But 263 types were given in the final count when the 5th volume was published 2001. (See §Contents of the published volumes).

For each ballad type in the collection, all variants in full text have been printed, up to a maximum of 25 variants, arranged chronologically (This means that for about 80% of the types, all known variants are exhaustively printed, while for the 20% remaining, only a listing of the variants are given beyond the 25 variants limit).

Another feature of SMB is that the accompanying melodies have been comprehensively printed alongside the text, unlike ballad collections in some of the other languages.

In 2005, a ballad collection was discovered in the library of Växjö that contained ballad types not enumerated in the SMB.

A full list of the Swedish ballad types is given in the List of Sveriges Medeltida Ballader.

== Contents of the published volumes ==
- Band 1 (1983): Naturmytisk visa "Ballads of the Supernatural" (SMB 1-36)
- Band 2 (1986): Legendvisa "Legendary Ballads" (SMB 37-54); Historisk visa "Historical Ballads" (SMB 55-65)
- Band 3 (1990): Riddarvisa "Ballads of Chivalry" I (SMB 66-130)
- Band 4:1 (1996): Riddarvisa II (SMB 131-169)
- Band 4:2 (1997): Riddarvisa III (SMB 170-196)
- Band 5:1 (2001) Kämpavisa "Heroic Ballads" (SMB 197-219); Skämtvisa "Jocular Ballads" I (SMB 220-233)
- Band 5:2 (2001) Skämtvisa II (SMB 234-263)

== See also ==
- GA = Geijer and Afzelius, Svenska folk-visor från forntiden (1814–1816) – pioneering Swedish ballad collection.
- SF =Adolf Ivar Arwidsson, Svenska fornsånger (1834) – another early Swedish compilation.
- GAB = Bergström and Höijer, Svenska folkvisor (1880) – revision of Geijer and Afzelius.
- List of folk song collections
- Danmarks gamle folkeviser – Danish folk ballad compilation
- Francis J. Child's The English and Scottish Popular Ballads – Compilation of traditional ballads in English.
