= Užgavėnės =

Lithuanian festival

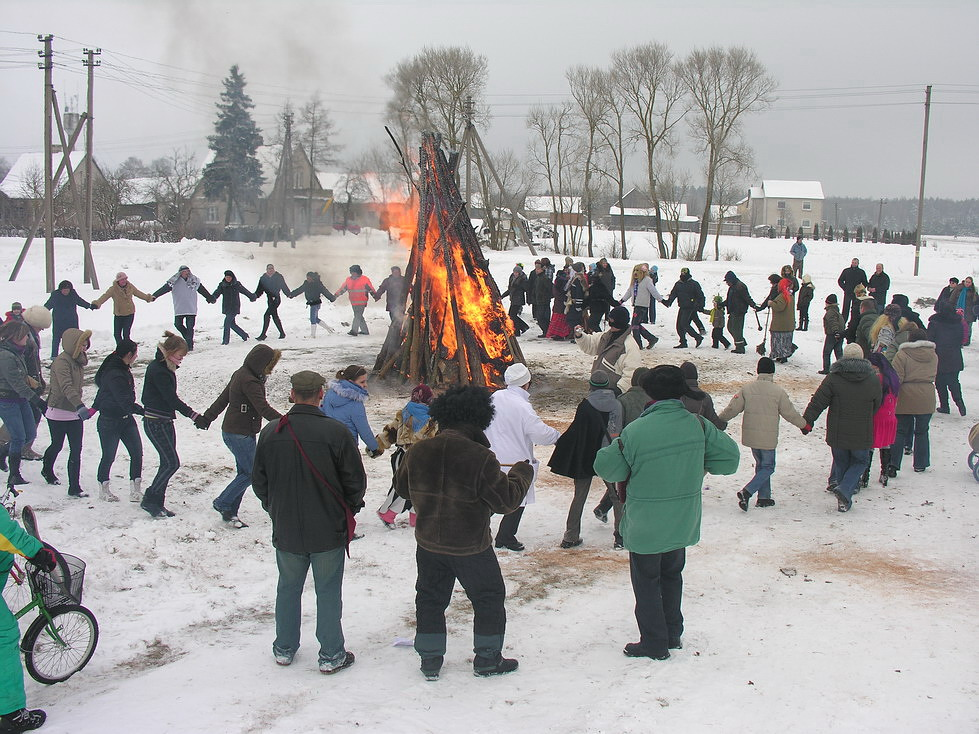
Užgavėnės in Samogitia in 2010

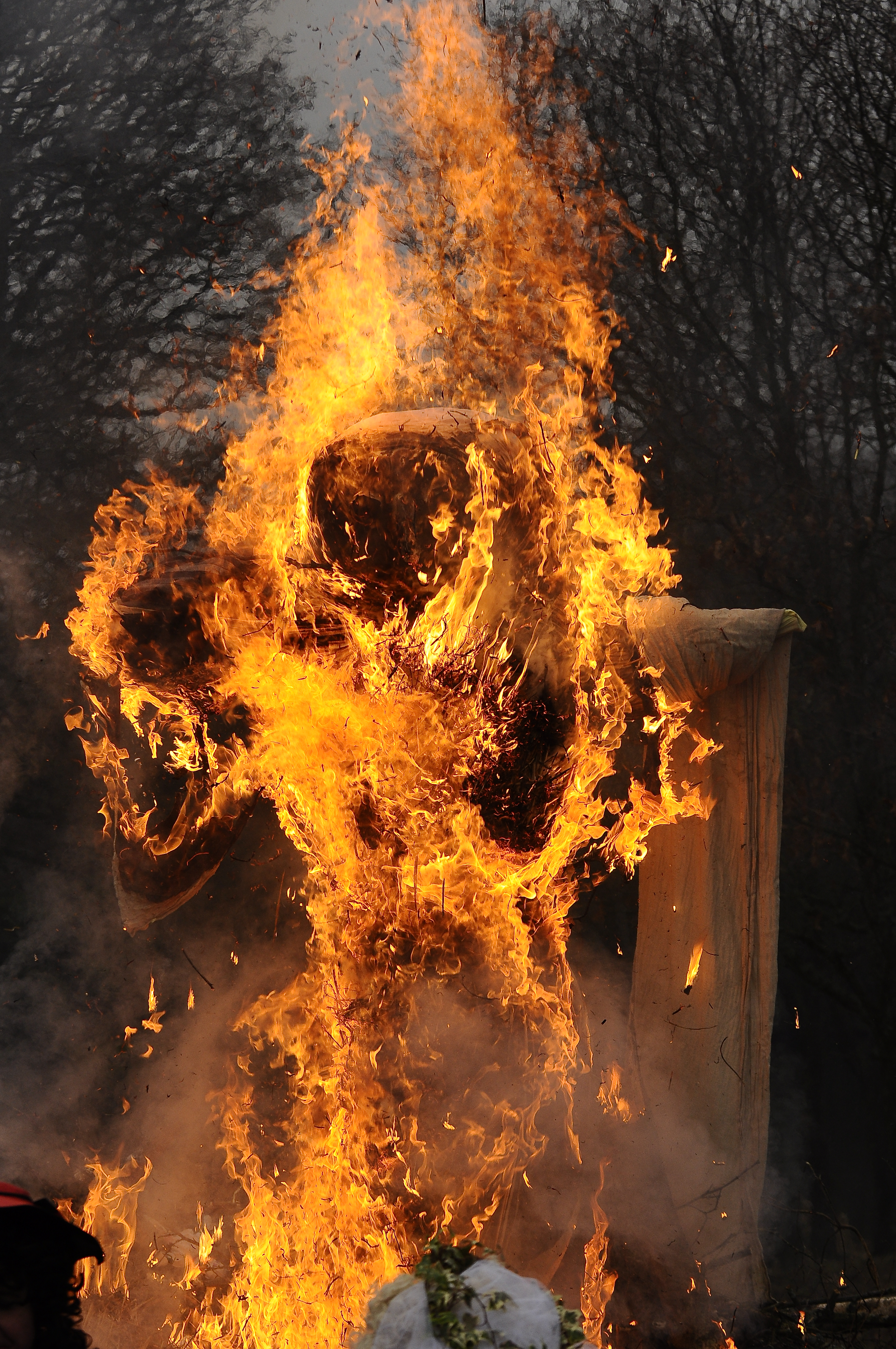
Morė on fire

Užgavėnės [ʊʒ'ɡaːvʲeːnʲeːs] is an ancient Lithuanian festival that takes place during the seventh week before Easter (Ash Wednesday). The celebration corresponds to Roman Catholic holiday traditions in other parts of the world, such as Mardi Gras, Shrove Tuesday, and Carnaval.

Užgavėnės begins on the night before Ash Wednesday, when an effigy of winter (usually named Morė) is burnt. A major element of the holiday, meant to symbolize the defeat of winter in the Northern Hemisphere, is a staged battle between Lašininis ("porky") personifying winter and Kanapinis ("hempen man") personifying spring. Devils, witches, goats, the grim reaper, and other joyful and frightening characters appear in costumes during the celebrations. The participants and masqueraders dance and eat the traditional dish of the holiday - pancakes with a variety of toppings.

== See also ==
- Meteņi
- Maslenitsa
