= Karl Fredrik Bergh =

Finnish scholar (1763-1844)

Karl Fredrik Bergh, sometimes known as Carl Fredrik Berg, in Finnish as Kaarle, and in Latin as Carolus Fridericus Berg (around 23 November 1763, died Suonenjoki 9 February 1844), was a cleric and scholar, noted for his interest in oral Finnish literature.

== Life ==
Bergh was born to Elisabet Bergh (d. 1798), daughter of the chaplain Henrik Bergh (d. 1732), and a lieutenant from Kuopio; he was baptised at Maaninka Monday 23 November 1763. Bergh attended Oulu's trivial school in 1785, taking the entrance examination for university 2 March 1786. He began studying at the Royal Academy of Turku on 2 March 1786. He was ordained priest in Porvoo diocese on 24 July 1788, serving as assistant to the vicar of Leppävirta that year 1788. He became parish priest in Suonenjoki in 1793, chaplain in 1798, and deputy pastor 1813.

In 1793, Bergh married Kristina Kjellman (d. 1807); in 1808 he married Juliana Bergh (d. 1821), daughter of the cleric Adam Bergh (1739–96); and in 1822 he married Katarina Charlotta Montell (d. 1833).

In all, he had four sons, who all had clerical careers: Johan Fredrik Bergh (1816–66) [fi], Gustaf Adam Bergh (1822–44), Nils Henrik Bergh (1824–45), and Julius Immanuel Bergh (1832–78) [fi].

== Role in Finnish literary history ==
In the 1897 assessment of A. R. Niemi,

Bergh was an enthusiastic propounder of the word of God, but he also took an interest in the Finnish language, being one of those early people, now often forgotten, who were sympathetic to Finnish, who believed with commitment in the future of a Finnish-speaking Finland and in their mind's eye envisaged a happier time coming for their fatherland than that in which they themselves chanced to live.

Bergh was the owner of a folio manuscript, copied in the eighteenth century by someone other than him from a yet earlier manuscript, containing eighteen 'Finska Runor' (Finnish poems). This represents some of the earliest recorded Finnish-language literature—though most of the poems are incomplete, cut off with an 'etc.'. The manuscript was collected from Bergh by Adolf Ivar Arwidsson and was one of the sources used by Henrik Gabriel Porthan. It is now held by the Suomalainen Kirjallisuuden Seura as A. I. Arvidsson Collection, MS no 488 a. 15 and contains the following texts:

Number	Number of lines	Manuscript title	English translation
1	42	Perustussanoja	Preliminary formula
2	160	Eldens ursprung	The origin of fire
3	127	Öfwer ormstyng	On snakebite
4	75	Raudan synty	The origin of iron
5	20	Mot kiöld	Against the cold
6	6	Haltioihin-saattosanoja	Falling into ecstasy
7	16	Laulajan virttä	Song of a singer
8	69	Om Barna Börd	On childbirth
9	25	Då Boskap utsläppes	When livestock is released
10	68	At fånga räfwar	To catch foxes
11	8	Emot Tandwärk	Against toothache
12	12	Emot Warg Styng	Against a wolf's bite
13	19	Så kallad Ähky	So-called ähky (colic)
14	56	Emot Syng	
15	38	Humalan Syndy	The origin of beer
16	22	Emot winter orm	Against winter-worm
17	6	Basilisk. Sisälisko	
18	15	Karjanlukua	Cattle-count
