= Svenska fornsånger =

Swedish folk song collection

Svenska fornsånger ("Old Swedish Songs") is a three-volume collection of Swedish folk songs compiled by Adolf Ivar Arwidsson and published in 1834, 1837, and 1842, respectively. The first two volumes consist mainly of folk ballads, while the third contains mainly singing games.

The work relied heavily on the folk song collection of Leonhard Fredrik Rääf, but also on older personal song books and collections from various institutions, such as the National Library in Stockholm. In addition, the first volume included a request for additional material to be forwarded to Arwidsson, some of which he included in the later volumes. The included melodies were arranged by Erik Drake.

Svenska fornsånger was not the first attempt to collect Swedish "medieval ballads"; notably, Erik Gustaf Geijer and Arvid August Afzelius had previously published the three-volume Svenska folk-visor från forntiden (1814–1816), which Arwidsson frequently refers back to. However, Arwidsson introduced a categorization of ballads, which would later be further developed by Svend Grundtvig into the system of classification that has largely been adhered to in later editions, such as Sveriges Medeltida Ballader and The Types of the Scandinavian Medieval Ballad.

== Sources ==
- Jonsson, Bengt R.; Solheim, Svale; Danielson, Eva, eds. (1978). The types of the Scandinavian medieval ballad (2nd ed.). Oslo: Universitetsforlaget. ISBN 82-00-09479-0.
- Jonsson, Bengt R.; Jersild, Margareta; Jansson, Sven-Bertil, eds. (1983). Sveriges medeltida ballader. Svenskt visarkiv/Musikverket. ISBN 9789122006190.
