= Thomas Helmore =

Anglican priest who was a choirmaster

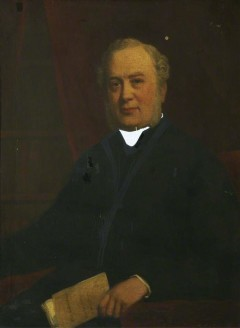
- Portrait of Thomas Helmore
- Born: 7 May 1811; Kidderminster
- Died: 6 July 1890 (aged 79); Westminster
- Occupations: Choirmaster, Writer and Author and Editor of hymns and carols

Thomas Helmore (7 May 1811, in Kidderminster – 6 July 1890, in Westminster) was a choirmaster, writer about singing and author and editor of hymns and carols.

Helmore's father was a congregationalist minister (also called Thomas). During the boy's childhood, the family moved from Kidderminster to Stratford-upon-Avon, where Helmore later trained his father's choir and taught in a school which his father had founded. Until the age of sixteen, he was educated at Mill Hill School with his brother Frederick. In 1837, he began his studies at Magdalen Hall, Oxford, graduating in 1840. He was ordained in the Church of England in the same year, and took up a curacy at St Michael on Greenhill, Lichfield, where he was also a priest-vicar in the Cathedral.

Two years later, he was appointed as precentor and vice-principal at St Mark's College, Chelsea, where the principal was Derwent Coleridge (son of the poet Samuel Taylor Coleridge). He soon came to be on friendly terms with his new colleague and, in 1844, he married Kate Pridham, who was Derwent Coleridge's sister-in-law.

His main duty at St Mark's was to train the students to sing a daily unaccompanied choral service in the college chapel. In the basic musical training, he was assisted by John Pyke Hullah. The choir's repertoire grew to include such as the anthems of Gibbons and Byrd and the motets of Palestrina, Vittoria and Marenzio. Helmore's growing reputation as a choirmaster led to his appointment in 1846 as master of the choristers in the Chapel Royal, St James's, where one of his pupils was Arthur Sullivan. He continued as precentor at St Mark's, however, until 1877.

At this time in Anglican and Catholic musical circles, there was a growing interest in plainsong. The sixteenth-century Booke of Common Praier Noted of John Merbecke was republished in 1844. In the same year, Helmore's friend William Dyce brought out his Book of Common Prayer with Plain Song. Helmore himself resolved to research and contribute. His aim was to create a setting which was authentic, but also well fitted to the text in tempo and accentuation. In 1849 he completed The Psalter Noted, the first of a series of similar works. His Primer of Plainsong (1877) came to be regarded as the standard work on the subject.

In 1853, the British ambassador to Sweden, G. J. R. Gordon, returned to England with a copy of the sixteenth-century song book Piae Cantiones, which he presented to John Mason Neale, known for his interest in early music. He, in turn, passed it on to Helmore whom he knew to be expert in the interpretation of the mensural notation in which the tunes were given. Neale translated the texts into English or, in a few cases, wrote completely new texts. He and Helmore published 12 of these tunes in that same year as Carols for Christmastide, and the following year 12 more as Carols for Eastertide. The Christmas set included Christ was born on Christmas Day from Resonet in laudibus, Good Christian men, rejoice from In dulci jubilo and Good King Wenceslas as completely new words for the spring carol Tempus adest floridum. Helmore immediately went on to publish a more substantial collection, The Hymnal Noted, where the texts were mostly Neale's translations from the Latin.

Helmore was appointed as executor of the will of Chauncy Hare Townshend and, on the latter's death in 1868, together with co-executrix Angela Burdett-Coutts, 1st Baroness Burdett-Coutts, he undertook the responsibility of founding an elementary school in London, which was finally opened in Rochester Street, Westminster, in 1876.

His interest in plainsong led him to make several visits, in and after 1875, to the Abbey of Saint Gall in Switzerland, to examine an ancient manuscript supposed to be an accurate copy of a book on Gregorian chant written by Saint Gregory himself.

He died at his home in Pimlico on 6 July 1890 and was buried in Brompton Cemetery.

== Some published works ==
- A Manual of Plain Song; containing:- A Brief Directory of the Plain Song used in the Morning and Evening Prayer, Litany, and Holy Communion; together with The Canticles and Psalter Noted, 1850
- Accompanying Harmonies to the Hymnal Noted (1852)
- Accompanying Harmonies To The Brief Directory Of The Plain Song: Used In The Morning And Evening Prayer, Litany, And Holy Communion, 1853
- Carols for Christmas-Tide, 1853 (with John Mason Neale)
- Carols for Easter-Tide, 1854 (with John Mason Neale)
- The Hymnal Noted, 1854
- The Ancient Plain-Song of the Church: Adapted to the American Book of Common Prayer, 1855
- The Psalter Noted: Carefully Compared and Made to Agree with the Psalter of the Standard Prayer (with Edward M. Pecke) (1856)
- Christ Was Born on Christmas Day: A Carol (with J. M. Neale), illustrated edition 1864
- Primer of Plainsong, 1877
- Translation of Fétis’ Treatise on Choir and Chorus Singing, 1885
