= Morė =

Lithuanian folk effigy

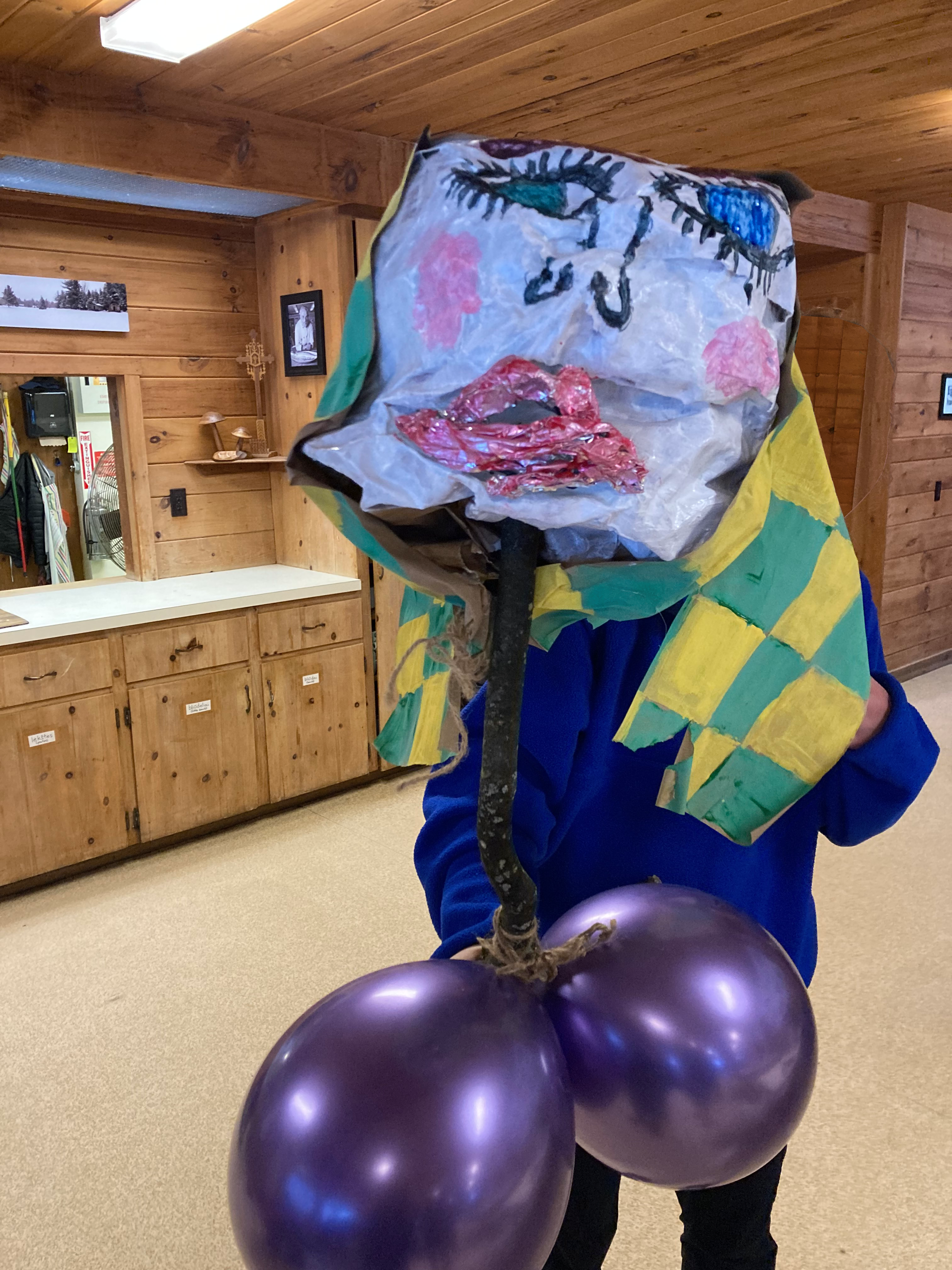
A Morė made for 2023 Užgavėnės celebrations.

Morė is one of the main effigies and attributes of the traditional Lithuanian folk festival Užgavėnės. It is an artificial woman (čiūčiala), stuffed with various materials, who is ultimately burned in a bonfire.

Morė is associated with the winter personification as a Slavic goddess Marzanna. She is burned because once it was believed that it will help to bring spring faster. Participants of the ritual are dancing around the bonfire and shouting "Žiema, žiema, bėk iš kiemo" (Winter, winter, run from the yard).
