= Brynica (disambiguation) =

The Brynica is a river in southern Poland.

Brynica may also refer to the following villages:

- Brynica, Łódź Voivodeship (central Poland)
- Brynica, Świętokrzyskie Voivodeship (south-central Poland)
- Brynica, Kluczbork County in Opole Voivodeship (south-west Poland)
- Brynica, Gmina Łubniany, Opole County in Opole Voivodeship (south-west Poland)
