= Walter Salmen =

German musicologist (1926–2013)

Walter Salmen (20 September 1926 in Paderborn – 2 February 2013 in Freiburg im Breisgau) was a German musicologist and university lecturer. Salmen taught from 1958 to 1992 as a professor of musicology at the Saarland University and the University of Kiel. Afterwards, he was for many years the full professor of the Musicological Institute of the University of Innsbruck. As a guest lecturer, he also worked in Switzerland, Israel and the United States. After retirement, he lived in Kirchzarten near Freiburg im Breisgau, and worked as honorary professor at the University of Freiburg.

== Publications ==
- Johann Friedrich Reichardt: Komponist, Schriftsteller, Kapellmeister und Verwaltungsbeamter der Goethezeit. Zürich and Freiburg 1963
- Geschichte der Musik in Westfalen bis 1800. Bärenreiter, Kassel 1963
- Geschichte der Musik in Westfalen im 19. und 20. Jahrhundert. Bärenreiter, Kassel 1967
- Zur Geschichte der Bärentreiber und der Tanzbären. In Gustaf Hilleström (editor): Studia instrumentorum musicae popularis III. (Musikhistoriska museets skrifter 5. Festschrift für Ernst Emsheimer.) Musikhistoriska museet, Stockholm 1974, p. 203–205
- "Geisslerlieder", in The New Grove Dictionary of Music and Musicians, ed. Stanley Sadie. 20 vol. London, Macmillan Publishers Ltd., 1980. ISBN 1-56159-174-2
- Musikleben im 16. Jahrhundert. Leipzig 1976 (Musikgeschichte in Bildern).
- Tanz im 17., 18. und 19. Jahrhundert. Leipzig 1988, 1989.
- Der Tanzmeister. Geschichte und Profile eines Berufes vom 14. bis zum 19. Jahrhundert. Georg Olms Verlag, Hildesheim 1997
- Der Spielmann im Mittelalter. Innsbrucker Beiträge zur Musikwissenschaft 8, Innsbruck, 1960
- Spielfrauen im Mittelalter. Georg Olms, Hildesheim 2000
- Der Tonkünstler Johann Friedrich Reichardt und Goethe: "... von der musikalischen Seite unser Freund, von der politischen unser Widersacher...". Eine Ausstellung des Goethe-Museums Düsseldorf zum 250. Geburtstag von Johann Friedrich Reichardt (1752–1814). Schloss Jägerhof, Düsseldorf 2002.
- "Nu pin ich worden alde...". Begegnungen und Verweigerungen im Leben eines Musikwissenschaftlers. Georg Olms, Hildesheim 2011
