= Adolf Ivar Arwidsson =

Finnish political journalist, writer, and historian (1791-1858)

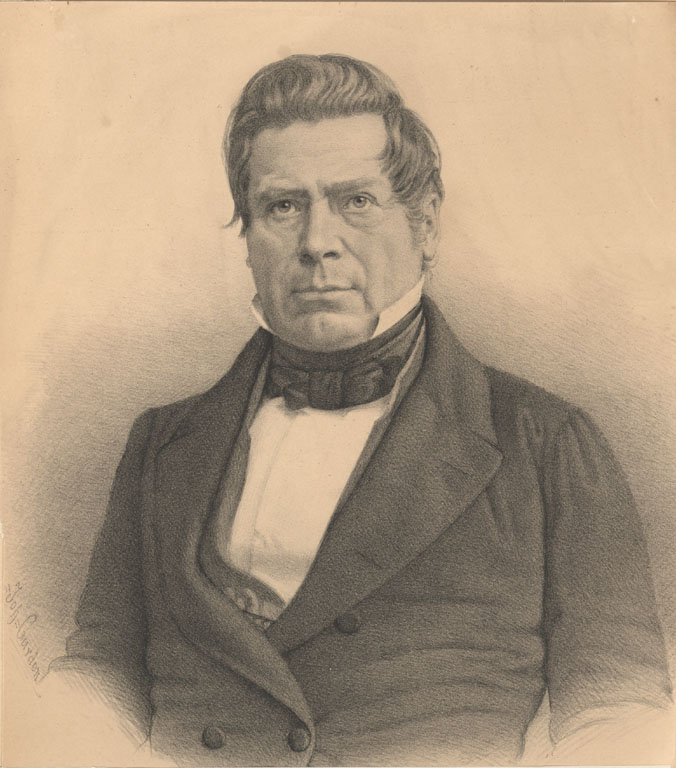
- Born: 7 August 1791; Padasjoki, Finland
- Died: 21 June 1858 (aged 66); Viipuri, Finland
- Resting place: Laukaa, Finland
- Occupations: Political journalist, writer, historian, librarian
- Employer: Royal Library, Stockholm
- Notable work: Svenska fornsånger (1834–42); Finland och dess framtid (1838)
- Spouse: Johanna Carolina Armfelt (m. 1824)

Adolf Ivar Arwidsson (7 August 1791 – 21 June 1858) was a Finnish political journalist, writer, and historian. His writing was critical of Finland's status at the time as a Grand Duchy under the Russian Tsars. Its sharpness cost him his job as a lecturer at The Royal Academy of Turku and he had to emigrate to Sweden, where he continued his political activity. He became director of the Royal Library in Stockholm in 1843. He has long been regarded as a forerunner of Finnish national awakening, though later scholarship has presented a more nuanced view of his political vision.

== Life ==
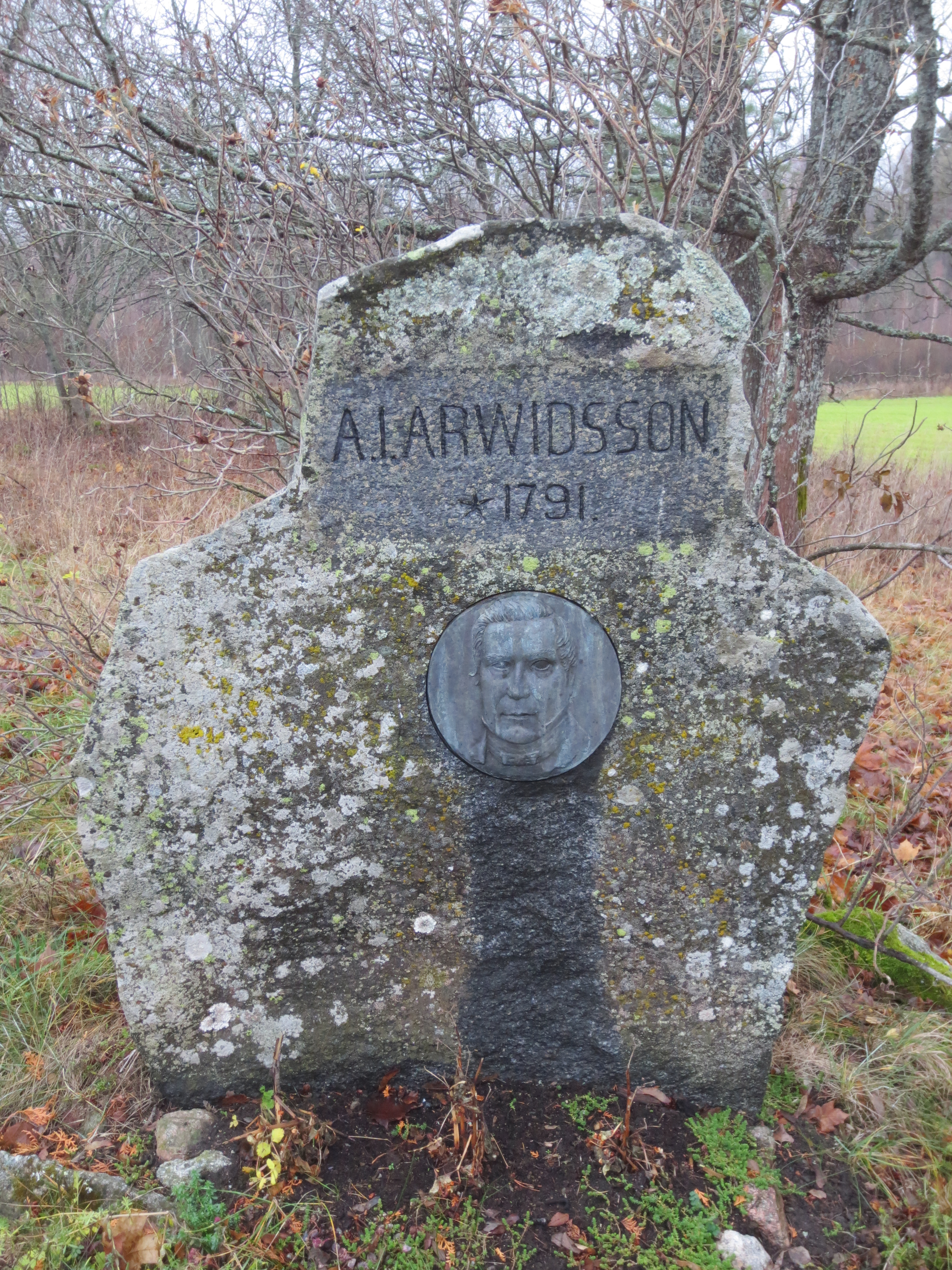
Memorial to Adolf Ivar Arwidsson - Unveiled in 1895. Padasjoki, Finland

Adolf Ivar Arwidsson was born in 1791 in Padasjoki in southern Finland. His father, the vicar Arvid Adolf Arwidsson, and his mother Anna Katarina Kolin, moved the family to Laukaa. The region was severely affected by the Finnish War of 1808–1809 and Arwidsson was left facing life under the Russian Empire, to which Finland now belonged as an autonomous Grand Duchy. It was here that Arwidsson's deep-seated antipathy toward Russia took root. In 1809, while still at high school in Porvoo, he witnessed the Diet of Porvoo, at which the Finnish estates swore oaths of allegiance to the Tsars.

In 1814 the Royal Academy of Turku awarded him his Magister degree in philosophy. In 1817 the same institution awarded him his doctorate, and he became a lecturer at the academy. Though Swedish was his native language and all his works are in Swedish, he was a fluent speaker of Finnish.

Arwidsson's earliest poem, Lifvets svärmeri (1813), was influenced by Frans Michael Franzén, but his verses soon took on an increasingly patriotic character. His poem Vid en smälthytta (1815) was published in a Swedish Romantic journal, Poetisk Kalender, which was edited by Per Daniel Amadeus Atterbom, bringing him to the attention of Swedish literary circles. Through visits to Sweden from 1816 onward he became personally acquainted with Atterbom and other leading figures of Swedish Romanticism. It was in this period that he developed the phrase that, somewhat modified, became an often quoted Fennoman credo: "Swedes we are no longer, Russians we do not want to become, let us therefore be Finns." (Swedish: "Svenskar äro vi icke längre, ryssar vilja vi icke bli, låt oss alltså vara finnar"; Finnish: "Ruotsalaisia emme enää ole, venäläisiksi emme tahdo tulla, olkaamme siis suomalaisia.")

In 1820, after his return to Finland, Arwidsson submitted for publication a political text whose sharp and radical tone soon ensured attention in the capital, Saint Petersburg. As a consequence, in 1822 he lost his position as a lecturer and was banished from the university. In 1823 he emigrated to Stockholm, where in 1825 he gained his civil rights and found work as a librarian in the royal library.

His marriage to Johanna Carolina Armfelt in 1824 was unusual for the time as they were from different estates. The marriage was met by mixed reactions among the noble civil servant class, and further complicated Arwidsson's efforts to establish himself in Sweden.

In 1827 Arwidsson undertook a research trip to Finland, but was immediately deported back to Sweden by the authorities. This experience led to a further radicalisation of his political work, and as a result he participated in several public debates in Sweden, in each of which he represented the situation in Finland in a dark light, but at the same time tried to portray the Finnish-national identity positively. In 1843 he was appointed director of the royal library, an appointment largely based on his scholarly merits, including his work editing historical source material on Finland and his authorship of a textbook on Finnish history and geography published in 1832. He was allowed to travel to Finland from the same year, but only took advantage of this in 1858, when he undertook a round trip through the country. During this journey Arwidsson caught pneumonia and died on 21 June in Viipuri. He was buried in his childhood home town of Laukaa. The following verses written by Elias Lönnrot were later carved onto his gravestone:

His love for his own country saw him banished, and brought him home again. Now he lies here, enshrouded by his own country.

== Political works ==
The political works of Adolf Ivar Arwidssons form two main phases. The first is his time as a lecturer in Turku. The second period of intensive political activity followed after his emigration to Sweden, where Arwidsson participated intensively in the debate over the situation of his homeland.

The most significant debate of Arwidsson's Swedish years was the polemic of 1838–1842 over Finland's constitutional status. In 1838, writing under the pseudonym Pekka Kuoharinen, he published the pamphlet Finland och dess framtid ("Finland and its future), a rebuttal of Israel Hwasser's defence of Finland's position within the Russian Empire. In it, he argued that Finland suffered from its connection to the Russian Empire and that conditions in some way were worse in Finland than in Russia. In 1842, the book Finlands nuvarande Stats-Författning, published under the pseudonym Olli Kekäläinen and attributed to Arwidsson by some historians, argues a more measured view in which there are both positive and negative consequences of Finland's status.

== Bibliography ==
- Ingenii romantici, aevo medii orti, expositio historica (1817)
- Historia Volsungorum. Svetice reddita I−III (1820−1821)
- Svenska konungar och deras tidehvarf I−II. (1830−1843)
- Ungdoms rimfrost af Sonen i Örnskog (1832)
- Lärobok i Finlands historia och geografi (1832)
- Svenska fornsånger I−III. (1834−1842)
- Stockholm förr och nu. (1837−1840)
- Finland och dess framtid (under the pseudonym Pekka Kuoharinen, 1838)
- Finlands nuvarande statsförfattning (under the pseudonym Olli Kekäläinen, 1841)
- Handlingar till upplysning af Finlands häfder I−X (1846−1858)
- Konung Gustaf III och hans samtida regenter. (1846)
- Bref utan “Munlås” (utg. af Svipdagr Gamle). (1847)
- Förteckning öfver k. bibliothekets i Stockholm isländska handskrifter. (1848)
- Lefnadsteckning öfver Carl XIV Johan. (1850)
- Trettio-åriga krigets märkvärdigaste personer. (1856)
- Adolf Ivar Arwidssonin tutkimuksia ja kirjoitelmia (1909).

=== Academic works ===
- Svenska fornsånger ("Old Swedish Songs", 1834–42)
- Förteckning öfver Kongl. Bibliothekets i Stockholm Isländska Handskrifter ("Inventory of the Icelandic Manuscripts in the Royal Library of Stockholm", 1848)
