= Arvid August Afzelius =

Swedish pastor, poet, historian and mythologist

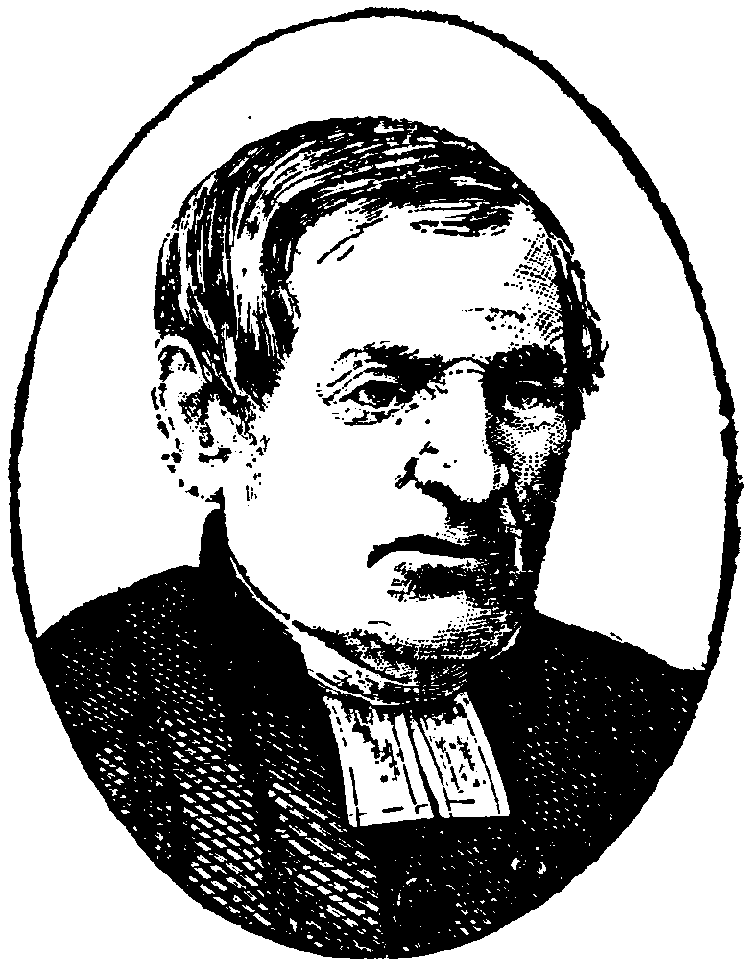
Arvid August Afzelius

Arvid August Afzelius (Swedish pronunciation: [ˈǎrːvɪd ˈǎʊɡɵst afˈsěːlɪɵs]; 8 October 1785, in Fjällåkra – 2 September 1871, in Enköping) was a Swedish pastor, poet, historian and mythologist.

== Historical background ==
From 1828 till his death he was parish priest of Enköping. He is mainly known as a collaborator with the learned historian, Erik Gustaf Geijer, in the great collection of Swedish folk-songs, Svenska folk-visor från forntiden, 3 vols (Stockholm, 1814–1817).

He also published translations of the Poetic Edda and Hervarar saga, and a history of Sweden to Charles XII (of which a German translation was published in 1842), as well as original poems.
