= Franz Magnus Böhme =

German academic, musicologist and composer

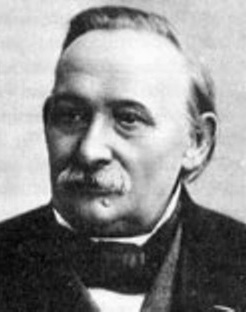
Franz Magnus Böhme

Franz Theodor Magnus Böhme (11 March 1827 in Willerstedt – 18 October 1898 in Dresden) was a German academic, musicologist, composer, folksong collector and writer on music history and folksong.

== Biography ==
The son of a farmer, Böhme became a primary school teacher in Thuringia. He then studied at the Conservatory in Leipzig under Moritz Hauptmann and Julius Rietz. From 1859 to 1878 he was a choirmaster and music teacher in Dresden, before teaching counterpoint and history of music at the Hoch Conservatory in Frankfurt am Main from 1878 to 1885. After 1885 he returned as a professor to Dresden, where he continued to teach.

Inspired by the example of Ludwig Uhland and Ludwig Erk, he was an avid collector and publisher of folk tunes, and contributed greatly to the establishment of research into German folk music. Böhme died in 1898 in Dresden, and was buried at the Trinitatisfriedhof (Holy Trinity cemetery). Having died in the former DDR, a great part of his legacy, in particular his manuscripts on the history of dance and folk songs (many of which remain unpublished to this day) passed to the former Institute for folk music research in Weimar. These are now preserved in the University archive/Thuringian state music archive at Weimar (shelf-mark FMB). Another part of his legacy, about 16000 collected songs, as well as his own compositions (shelf-marks Mus.1-W-26, Mus.1-W-27 / Mscr.Dresd.App.2345) are to be found today in the state library of Saxony and state and university library of Dresden.

A street is named after him in his birthplace, Willerstedt.

== Selected works ==
=== Collections ===
- Altdeutsches Liederbuch. Volkslieder der Deutschen nach Wort und Weise aus dem 12. bis zum 17. Jahrhundert, 1877 (Digital link).
- Deutscher Liederhort, Neubearbeitung und Fortsetzung des Werkes von Ludwig Erk, 3 Bände, 1893/94
- Volksthümliche Lieder der Deutschen im 18. und 19. Jahrhundert, 1895 (Franz Magnus Böhme is available for free viewing and download at the Internet Archive).
- Deutsches Kinderlied und Kinderspiel, 2 Bände, 1870/97 (Franz Magnus Böhme is available for free viewing and download at the Internet Archive).

=== Books ===
- Geschichte des Oratoriums, 1861
- Geschichte des Tanzes in Deutschland, 1886

== Bibliography (in German) ==
- Brockhaus, Riemann Musiklexikon Vol. 1 (1998) p. 155, ISBN 3-254-08396-2
- Kurt Thomas: Bericht über einen Teilnachlaß von Franz Magnus Böhme im Institut für Volksmusikforschung Weimar, Jahrbuch für Volksliedforschung 38 (1993), S. 13–26.
- Otto Holzapfel, together with Brigitte Emmrich and Heike Müns: Sammlung Franz Magnus Böhme in der Sächsischen Landesbibliothek in Dresden, Jahrbuch für Volksliedforschung 38 (1993), pp. 27–49 [zur Wissenschaftsgeschichte und dem Entstehen des Erk-Böhme, Deutscher Liederhort, 1893/94, und dem Nachlass Böhmes].
- Horst Seeger: Musiklexikon Personen A–Z / Deutscher Verlag für Musik Leipzig (1981), Seite 102 ff.
- E. Stockmann: Zum Nachlass Franz Magnus Böhmes, Deutsches Jahrbuch für Volkskunde VIII, 1962
- Robert Eitner (1903). "Böhme, Franz Magnus". Allgemeine Deutsche Biographie (in German). Vol. 47. Leipzig: Duncker & Humblot. pp. 77–79.
- Walter Salmen (1955). "Böhme, Franz Magnus". Neue Deutsche Biographie (in German). Vol. 2. Berlin: Duncker & Humblot. pp. 387–388. (full text online).
