= Deutscher Liederhort =

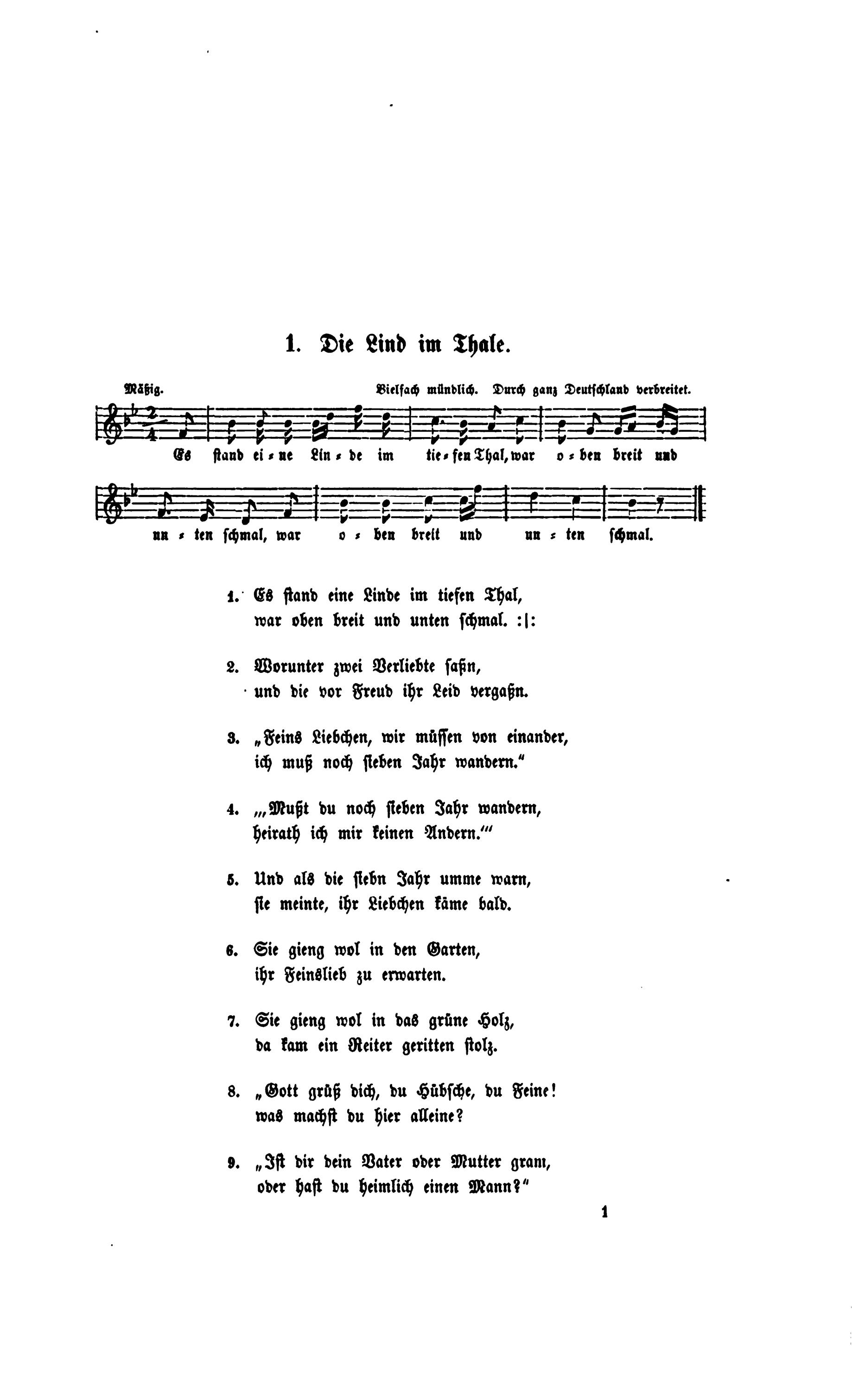

The Deutscher Liederhort is a large collection of Volkslieder (folk-songs), now considered their authoritative source. It is often abbreviated as "Erk-Böhme" after its editors Ludwig Erk and Franz Magnus Böhme.

== Editions ==
- Ludwig Erk (ed.): Deutscher Liederhort: Auswahl der vorzüglichern deutschen Volkslieder aus der Vorzeit und der Gegenwart mit ihren eigenthümlichen Melodien. Enslin, Berlin 1856 (Text at Google Books).
- Ludwig Erk, Franz Magnus Böhme (ed.s): Deutscher Liederhort. 3 Bände. Breitkopf und Härtel, Leipzig 1893–94 (Reprinted: Olms, Hildesheim 1963).
  - Volume 1, 1893 (Online).
  - Volume 2, 1893 (Online).
  - Volume 3, 1894 (Online).
