= Ludwig Erk =

German musicologist

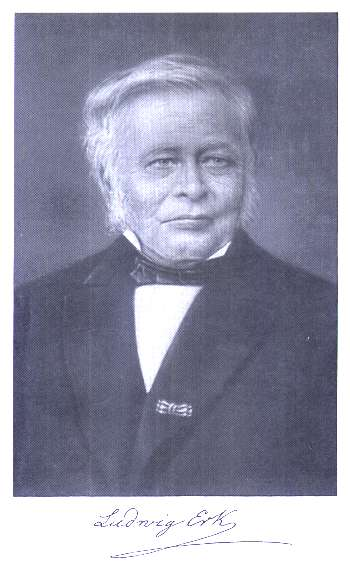
Ludwig Erk

Ludwig Christian Erk (6 January 1807, Wetzlar – 25 November 1883, Berlin) was a German musicologist, music teacher, academic, composer and folk-song collector.

== Bibliography ==
- Friedrich Wilhelm Bautz: Erk, Ludwig Christian. In: Biographisch-Bibliographisches Kirchenlexikon (BBKL). Band 1, Bautz, Hamm 1975. 2., unveränderte Auflage Hamm 1990, ISBN 3-88309-013-1, Sp. 1535.
- Max Friedlaender: Erk, Ludwig. In: Allgemeine Deutsche Biographie (ADB). volume 48, Duncker & Humblot, Leipzig 1904, S. 394–397.
- Walter Salmen: Erk, Ludwig Christian. In: Neue Deutsche Biographie (NDB). volume 4, Duncker & Humblot, Berlin 1959, ISBN 3-428-00185-0, p. 590 f. (digitalised).
- Ernst Schade: Was das Volk zu singen weiss, Ludwig Erk: Leben und Werk eines Liedersammlers, 1992, ImHayn Verl., ISBN 3-928149-03-2
