= Gunlöd =

Gunlöd may refer to:

- Gunnlöð, a being in Norse mythology.
- Gunlöd (opera), an opera by Peter Cornelius

== See also ==
- 657 Gunlöd, a background asteroid
