= List of compositions by Paul Manz =

This list of compositions by Paul Manz includes all the published choral and organ works by American composer Paul Manz.

== Choral ==
Title	Liturgy or Occasion	Arrangement(s)
A Hodie Processional	Christmas	SATB; Opt. Keyboard
The Angel Gabriel from Heaven Came	Advent; Christmas	SATB
Antiphonal Carol	Christmas	Unison, with organ
Christmas Jubilation	Christmas	SATB, with organ
The Church's One Foundation	Reformation	SATB with Organ, Brass Quartet, opt. Oboe
E'en So, Lord Jesus, Quickly Come	Advent	SATB; SSAA; TTBB
Ever Since the Savior Came	Christmas	SATB
I Caused Thy Grief	Lent	SATB, with organ
I Want to Walk as a Child of the Light	Epiphany	
Let Us Ever Walk with Jesus		Unison, with a solo
On My Heart Imprint Thine Image	Lent	SATB a capella
Peace Came to Earth	Christmas	SATB
Praise to the Lord, the Almighty	Easter	SATB with Organ and brass quartet
Preserve Me, O Lord		SATB a capella
Sing a New Song to the Lord	Reformation	SATB

== Organ ==
Title	Liturgy or Occasion	Other instruments / Notes
Ah, Holy Jesus	Lent; Holy Week	
All Glory, Laud and Honor	Lent; Passion; Palm Sunday	
Aria	Weddings Funerals General Use Organ recitals	Was used during the funeral service for Ronald Reagan at Washington National Cathedral
At the Lamb's High Feast We Sing	Easter	
Awake, My Heart, with Gladness	Easter	
Aus Tiefer Not	Lent	setting hymn "Aus tiefer Not schrei ich zu dir", with flute and oboe
Christ, the Life of All the Living	Lent	
Ein feste Burg	Reformation	setting hymn "Ein feste Burg ist unser Gott"
Freu dich sehr	Advent	
Go to Dark Gethsemane	Lent; Holy Week	
Good Christian Friends, Rejoice and Sing	Easter	
Grosser Gott	Trinity	setting hymn "Großer Gott, wir loben dich"
Haf Trones Lampa fardig	Advent	
Herzliebster Jesu	Lent	setting hymn "Herzliebster Jesu"
How Lovely Shines the Morning Star	Advent, Christmas, Epiphany	B-flat Instruments or C Instruments
I Want to Walk as a Child of the Light		
Jesus Christ Is Risen Today	Easter	
Jesus Lives! The Victory's Won	Easter	
Jesus, I Will Ponder Now	Lent	
Jesus, Lover of My Soul/Savior, When in Dust to You	Lent	
Kirken den er et gammelt Hus	Reformation	
Komm heiliger Geist, Herre Gott	Pentecost	setting hymn "Komm, Heiliger Geist, Herre Gott"
Liebster Jesu, wir sind hier	Baptism; Processional	setting hymn "Liebster Jesu, wir sind hier"
Look, Oh, Look, the Sight Is Glorious	Ascension of Jesus	
Lord Jesus Christ, Be Present Now	Communion	
My Song Is Love Unknown	Lent	
Now All the Vault of Heaven Resounds	Easter	
Now the Green Blade Rises	Easter; Advent	
O Lord, throughout These Forty Days	Lent	
O Sacred Head, Now Wounded	Lent; Holy Week	setting hymn "O Haupt voll Blut und Wunden"
Partita on From Heaven Above to Earth I Come	Christmas	
Partita on St. Anne		
Prelude on In Babilone		
Reprise (Reflections on "E'en So, Lord Jesus")	Memorial	
Savior of the Nations, Come	Advent	
Schümcke Dich	Communion	setting hymn "Schmücke dich, o liebe Seele"
Sine nomine	All Saints Day	
Tantum ergo/Dulce carmen	General use	
Toccata on At the Lamb's High Feast	Easter	
What Wondrous Love This Is	Lent	
