= Wie schön leuchtet der Morgenstern =

Chorale by Philipp Nicolai

- Lutheran hymn
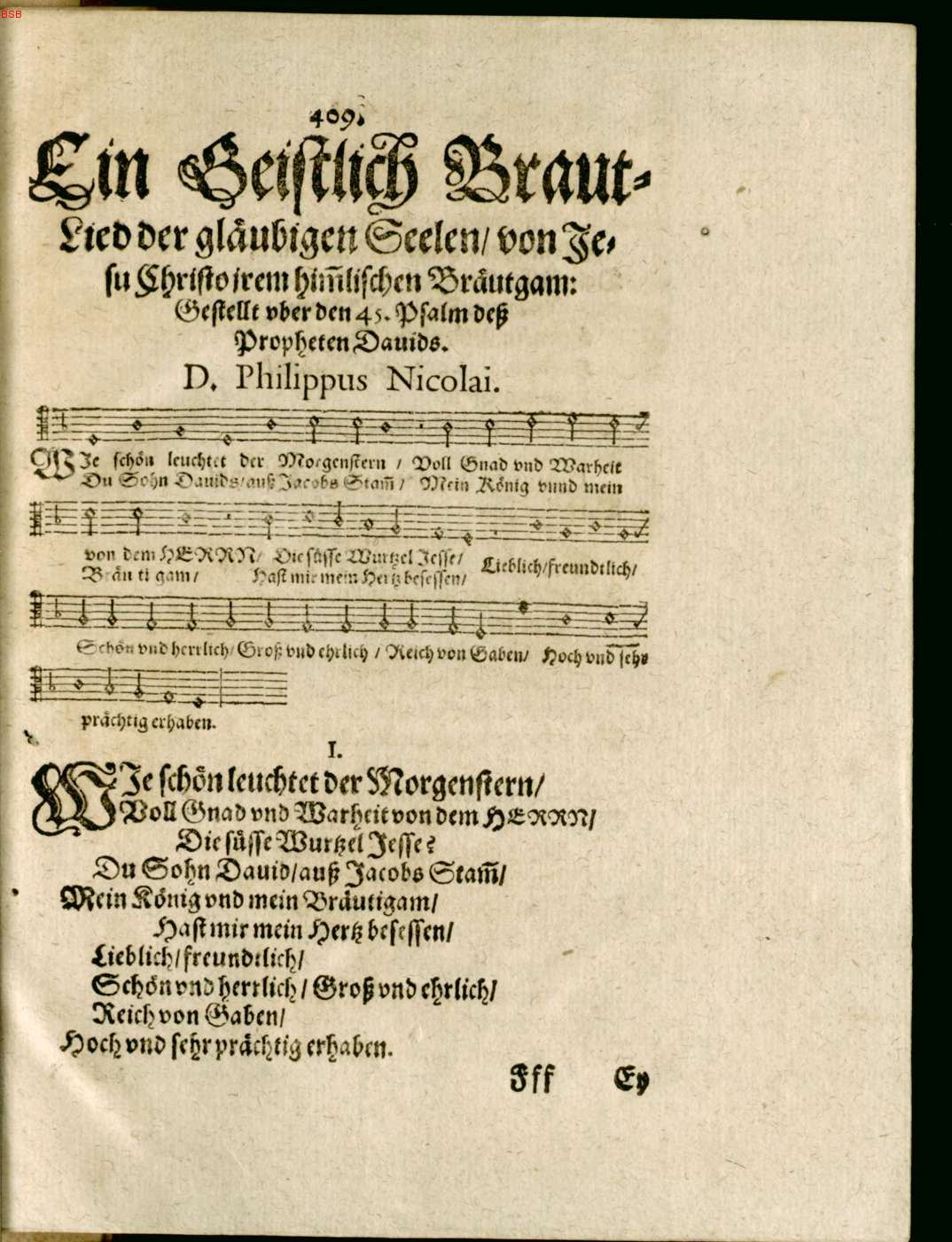
- First publication in Nicolai's 1599 Freudenspiegel deß ewigen Lebens
- English: How lovely shines the morning star
- Catalogue: Zahn 8359
- Written: 1597
- Text: by Philipp Nicolai
- Language: German
- Melody: by Nicolai, reminiscent of a 1538 tune
- Published: 1599
- Tune (organ)

"Wie schön leuchtet der Morgenstern" (German pronunciation: [viː ʃøːn ˈlɔɪ̯çtət deːɐ̯ ˈmɔʁɡn̩ˌʃtɛʁn]; lit. 'How lovely shineth the morning star') is a Lutheran hymn by Philipp Nicolai written in 1597 and first published in 1599. It inspired musical settings through centuries, notably Bach's chorale cantata Wie schön leuchtet der Morgenstern, BWV 1, but also vocal and instrumental works by Baroque composers, Peter Cornelius, Felix Mendelssohn, Max Reger, Hugo Distler, Ernst Pepping, Mauricio Kagel and Naji Hakim.

== History ==
Nicolai wrote the text in response to a pestilence in 1597. The hymn, in seven stanzas, is based on Psalm 45, a mystical wedding song. Jesus is identified with the morning star, according to Revelation 22:16, and with the bridegroom of the psalm. The initials of the seven stanzas form the same acrostic as the full name of Nicolai's pupil Wilhelm Ernst Graf und Herr zu Waldeck: 1) Wie schön, 2) Ey meine Perl, ... 6) Zwingt die Saiten, 7) Wie bin ich.

Nicolai published the hymn first in 1599 in his collection Frewdenspiegel deß ewigen Lebens ("Mirror of Joy of the Life Everlasting") in Frankfurt, together with "Wachet auf, ruft uns die Stimme". He introduced it: "Ein Geistlich Brautlied der Gläubigen Seelen / von Jesu Christo irem himlischen Bräutgam: Gestellt ober den 45. Psalm deß Propheten Dauids" (A spiritual bridal song of the believing soul / concerning Jesus Christ, her heavenly bridegroom, founded on the 45th Psalm of the prophet David).

== Tune ==
The hymn tune of "Wie schön leuchtet der Morgenstern", Zahn No. 8359, was codified then as a creation of Nicolai. C. S. Terry claimed in an article in 1917 that the melody was at least 61 years older than Nicolai's publication. Joachim Stalmann wrote in 2000 that Nicolai's melody is reminiscent ("hat Anklänge") of a 1538 melody published in the Strasbourg Psalter in 1539 with the song "Jauchzet dem Herren alle Land", possibly by Jakob Dachser.

== Translations ==
The hymn appeared in several translations in English hymnals, beginning with "How bright appears the Morning Star!" by John Christian Jacobi, in his Psalmodica Germanica, 1722, p. 90. The first stanza, in an anonymous English translation beginning "How splendid shines the morning star", appeared in the Southern Harmony, an 1835 shape-note tunebook compiled by William Walker, where it is set to a tune called Morning Star by composer J. C. Lowry. This arrangement is repeated in An American Christmas Harp, with the addition of two more stanzas in a translation by William Mercer (1811–1873). The hymn has been referred to as the "Queen of Chorales".

== Musical settings ==
The words, speaking of süße musica (sweet music) in the sixth stanza, and the melody have inspired composers to vocal and instrumental settings. Other hymns to Nicolai's tune include "O heilger Geist, kehr bei uns ein" by Michael Schirmer (1640).

=== Vocal works ===
"Wie schön leuchtet der Morgenstern" was seized upon by many composers of the period. Dieterich Buxtehude used it (BuxWV223), as did Johann Kuhnau. Michael Praetorius published a setting in Polyhymnia Caduceatrix et Panegyrica (1618–19, Wolfenbüttel).

Johann Sebastian Bach based his 1725 chorale cantata Wie schön leuchtet der Morgenstern, BWV 1, on the complete hymn. He used single stanzas in four-part settings for other cantatas: the fourth stanza as the closing chorale of Erschallet, ihr Lieder, erklinget, ihr Saiten! BWV 172, the fifth stanza in Wer da gläubet und getauft wird, BWV 37, the sixth stanza in Schwingt freudig euch empor, BWV 36, and the seventh stanza in the final duet of Ich geh und suche mit Verlangen, BWV 49. The final lines of the seventh stanza form the closing chorale of Nun komm, der Heiden Heiland, BWV 61.

Wilhelm Friedemann Bach composed a cantata Wie schön leuchtet der Morgenstern (F 82). Christian Geist set the words for soprano, two violins, viola da gamba and basso continuo.

"Die Könige", from: Weihnachtslieder Opus 8,3

In 1870 Peter Cornelius published his second version of “Die Könige” (The kings), as part of six Weihnachtslieder, Op. 8, a song for solo voice and piano. He used the "Wie schön" melody for the accompaniment of his own vocal melody. The song was later reworked into an Epiphany anthem in English for solo voice and chorus in which the soloist sings the text "Three Kings from Persian lands afar..." (using Cornelius's original tune) over the choir which performs the chorale setting from Cornelius's original piano accompaniment. A version of "The Three Kings" is included in the first volume of the popular Willcocks and Jacques compilation Carols for Choirs.

Christus is the title given by the composer's brother Paul to fragments of an unfinished oratorio by Felix Mendelssohn, published posthumously as Op. 97. The completed portions include a four-part setting of the chorale tune in the chorus "There Shall a Star from Jacob Shine Forth."

Hugo Distler treated the tune both instrumentally as well as vocally, with an a cappella arrangement for four voices. Mauricio Kagel quoted the stanza "Zwingt die Saiten in Cythara" in his oratorio Sankt-Bach-Passion telling Bach's life, composed for the tricentenary of Bach's birth in 1985.

=== Instrumental works ===
Bach wrote several chorale preludes for organ on the chorale. Bach's student Johann Ludwig Krebs wrote a prelude on the chorale tune. So did Pachelbel in his Erster Theil etlicher Choräle. Pachelbel's student Johann Heinrich Buttstett composed a chorale setting for organ as well. Dieterich Buxtehude also wrote a chorale fantasia Wie schön leuchtet der Morgenstern (BuxWV 223).

Felix Mendelssohn used this theme as cantus firmus in one of his early fugues for string quartet, MWV R 12, composed in 1821 when he was age 12, as a contrapuntal composition exercise when studying with Carl Friedrich Zelter.

In 1899 Max Reger composed an organ fantasy on "Wie schön leucht't uns der Morgenstern", the first of two, Zwei Choralphantasien, Op. 40. He also wrote in 1902 a chorale prelude, No. 49 in his collection of 52 Chorale Preludes, Op. 67. Ernst Pepping wrote in 1933 a partita, "Partita über den Choral 'Wie schön leuchtet der Morgenstern'". Hugo Distler composed a prelude for organ entitled Vorspiel und Satz 'Wie schön leuchtet der Morgenstern', as part of his Op. 8, No. 3, published in 1938.

In 1954 Jan Koetsier composed the "Partita for English Horn and Organ" Op. 41, No. 1, which includes the melody played by the English horn over an organ accompaniment in the final movement. Howard Hanson used the choral tune as the basis for his orchestral work "Dies Natalis" (1967). In 1974 Gloria Coates composed Phantasie über 'Wie schön leuchtet der Morgenstern' for amplified viola and organ. Rolf Schweitzer wrote in 1983 a meditative work for organ, Orgelmeditation 'Morgenstern'.

Australian composer, Graeme Koehne, referenced the chorale in a work titled To His servant Bach God grants a final glimpse; the morning star (1989). Naji Hakim composed in 2008 Wie schön leuchtet der Morgenstern, variations for oboe (flute, violin) and organ. Organist and composer Paul Manz also created a chorale setting for organ and solo instrument called "How Lovely Shines the Morning Star" (2009).
