= Christus (Mendelssohn) =

Unfinished oratorio by Felix Mendelssohn

- Unfinished oratorio by Felix Mendelssohn
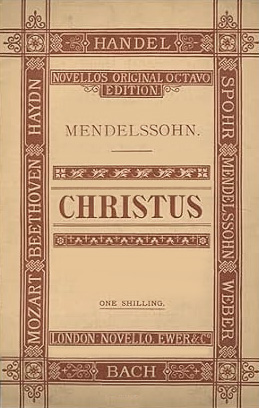
- Cover of the 1905 Novello edition of Mendelssohn's Christus
- Opus: 97
- Text: Christian Karl Josias von Bunsen
- Language: German
- Performed: 1852: Düsseldorf
- Scoring: Bass-baritone, soprano, alto, tenor soloists; SATB choir; orchestra

Christus is the title of an unfinished oratorio by Felix Mendelssohn, which exists only as a collection of fragments. The title was given to the work by the composer's brother, Paul, and it was published posthumously as Op. 97. Some scholars believe the completed movements may have been intended as parts of a larger, unrealised work.

Movements from Christus are commonly performed at the Feast of Epiphany due to their references to prophecies of a star, associated with the Biblical account of the Three Wise Men following the Star of Bethlehem. The work includes two Lutheran hymns, "Wie schön leuchtet der Morgenstern" and "Er nimmt auf seinen Rücken".

== Composition history ==
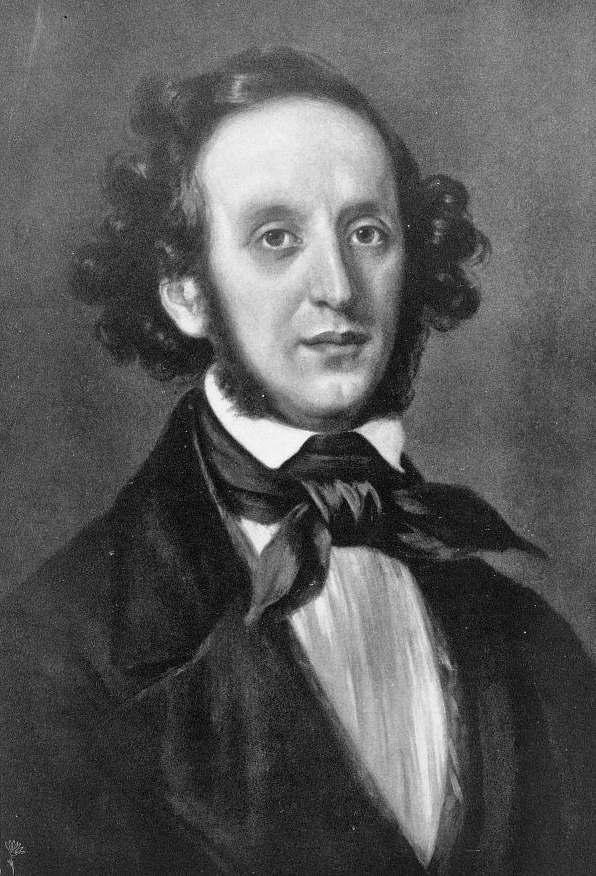
Composer Felix Mendelssohn

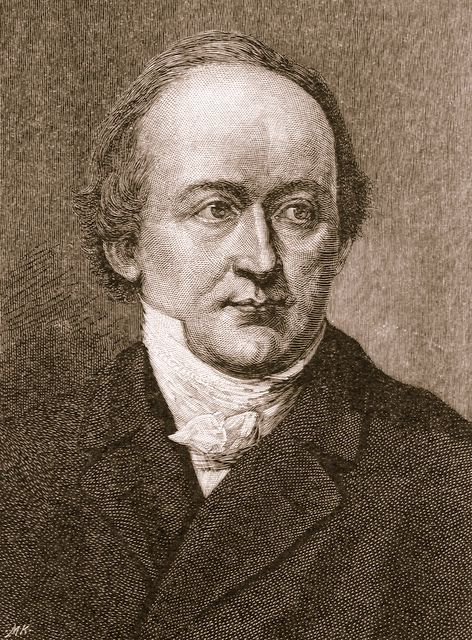
Librettist Christian Charles Josias von Bunsen

Writing in 1848, the musicologist Otto Jahn noted that Felix Mendelssohn had begun to compose a new oratorio while he was still working on Elijah, and surmised that the work that later came to be known as Christus formed part of a complementary whole along with Elijah, emphasising the Incarnation of Christ as the fulfilment of Old Testament prophecies.

After Elias, Mendelssohn was searching for a libretto for a new oratorio and consulted a number of scholars for inspiration, among them Julius Schubring, Johann Gustav Droysen and Henry Chorley. A successful collaboration emerged in 1844, when Christian Karl Josias von Bunsen produced a libretto compiled from biblical sources. Composition began in 1846 and continued through Mendelssohn's last year. It is thought that certain material from Mendelssohn's embryonic composition was included in his oratorio Erde, Hölle und Himmel, possibly the third number, "Es wird ein Stern aus Jacob aufgeh'n". Queen Victoria recorded in her diary that Mendelssohn performed this work for her during his visit to Britain in 1847.

After Felix Mendelssohn's death in Leipzig in November 1847, his brother Paul acquired Felix's untitled autograph. Finding the collection of movements all related to the life of Christ, Paul published the work under the title Christus, with the opus number 97.

== Movements ==
"Da Jesus geboren ward" and the opening of "Wo ist der neugeboren" in Mendelssohn's autograph manuscript of 1847

The existing fragments of Christus comprise 16 movements for choir and solo voices, relating the Biblical accounts of the Nativity and Passion of Jesus. The completed portions include a tenor recitative relating Christ's birth, two choruses "Wo ist der neugeborne?" ("Where is the newborn?") and "Es wird ein Stern aus Jacob aufgeh'n" ("There Shall a Star from Jacob Come Forth") using Philipp Nicolai's chorale "Wie schön leuchtet der Morgenstern", and a passion section ending with another chorale, Paul Gerhardt's "O Welt, sieh hier dein Leben". The first performance took place in 1852.

No.	Form	Title	Source
1	Recit	"Da Jesus geboren ward"	Matthew 2:1
2	Trio:	"Wo ist der neugeborne"	Matthew 2:2
3	Choir:	"Es wird ein Stern aus Jakob aufgehn" with chorale "Wie schön leuchtet der Morgenstern"	Numbers 24:17–18, Philipp Nicolai
4	Recit:	"Und der ganze Haufe"	Luke 23:1–2
5	Choir:	"Diesen finden wir"	Luke 23:2–3
6	Recit:	"Pilatus sprach"	Luke 23:4–5
7	Choir:	"Er hat das Volk erregt"	Luke 23:4–5
8	Recit:	"Pilatus aber sprach"	John 18:38, Luke 23:4–5
9	Choir:	"Hinweg mit diesem"	Luke 23:18–19
10	Recit:	"Da rief Pilatus abermals"	Luke 23:20–21
11	Choir:	"Kreuzige, kreuzige ihn!"	Luke 23:20–21, John 19:6
12	Recit:	"Pilatus sprach zu ihnen"	John 19:6–7
13	Choir:	"Wir haben ein Gesetz"	John 19:7
14	Recit:	"Da überantwortete er"	John 19:16–17, Luke 23:27
15	Choir:	"Ihr Töchter Zions" ("Daughters of Zion")	Luke 23:28–30
16	Chorale	"Er nimmt auf seinen Rücken"/"Wo bist du, Sonne, blieben?"	Paul Gerhardt

== Analysis ==
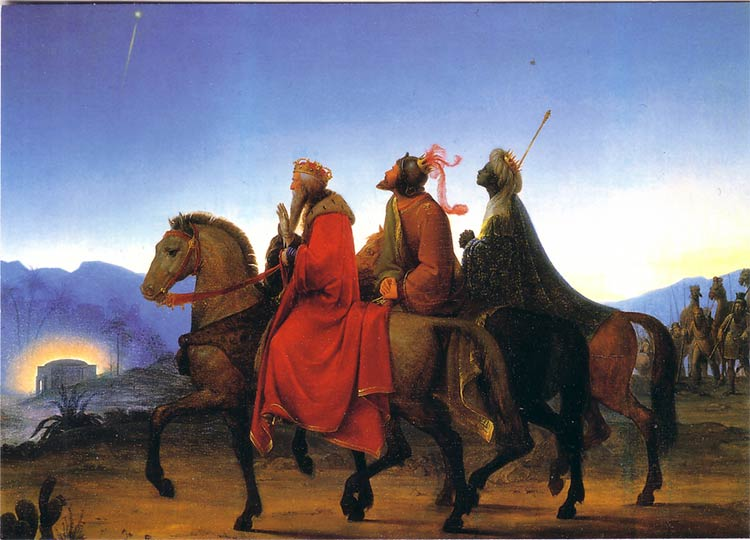
Sections of Christus are connected to the story of the Three Wise Men following the Star of Bethlehem and may be sung at Epiphany

External videos
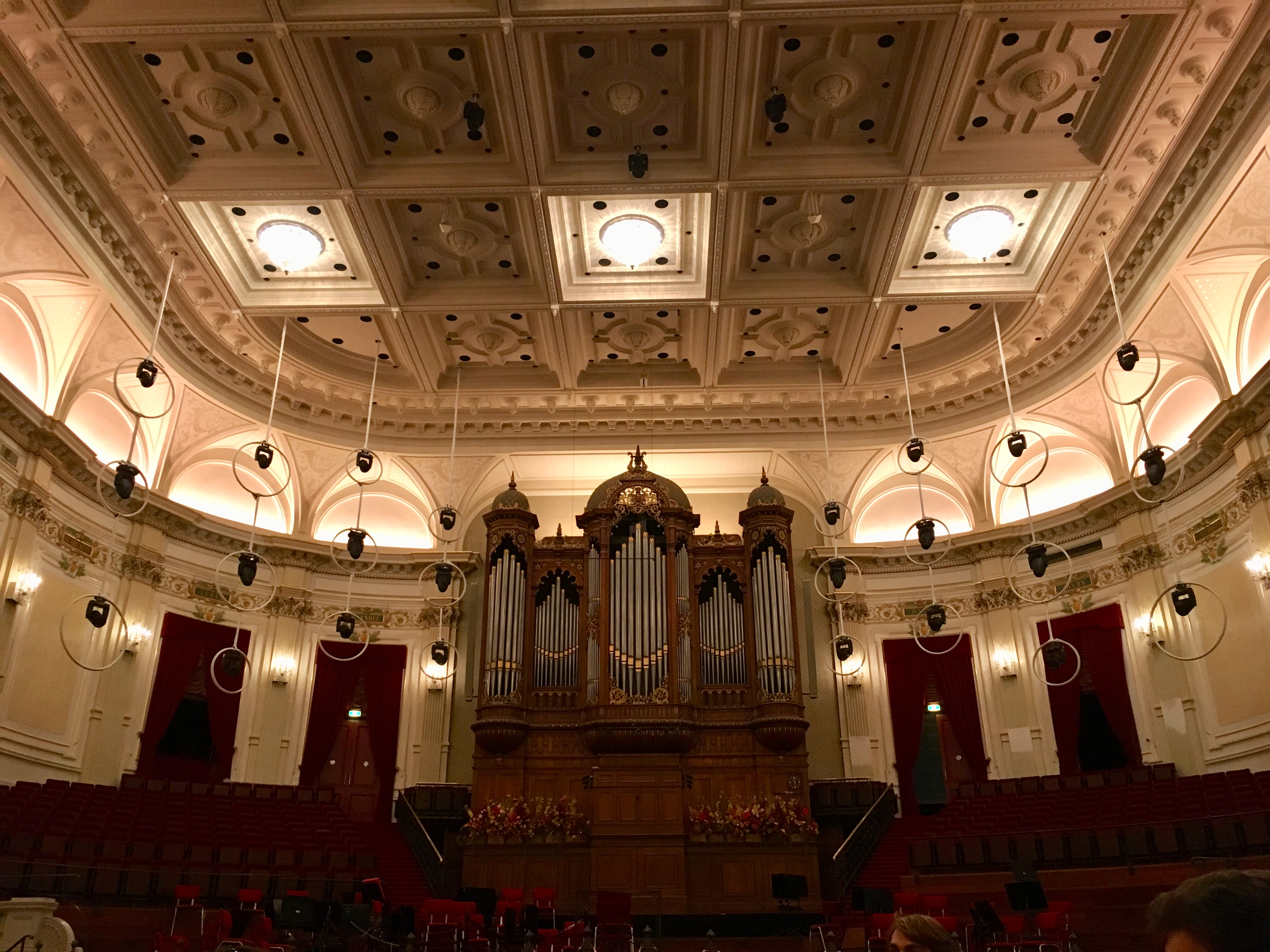
- Video: Mendelssohn's Christus, Op.97 sung by the Choir of St John's College, Cambridge at the Concertgebouw, Amsterdam in 2023

Paul Mendelssohn's choice of Christus as the title for the oratorio was based on the completed fragments relating the life of Christ. Music scholars have compared it to Felix Mendelssohn's earlier work Erde, Hölle und Himmel ("Earth, Hell and Heaven") and surmise that the completed movements of Christus were intended to form the Erde part of a larger work, to be followed two more unrealised sections concerned with the Crucifixion, Christ's descent into Hell and Resurrection (Hölle), and the Last Judgment (Himmel).

The third movement of Christus, "Es wird ein Stern aus Jakob aufgehn" ("A Star shall come out of Jacob") may be understood as a prophecy about the reign of King David, but Mendelssohn emphasises a Christological interpretation, associating it with the New Testament account of the Three Wise Men following the Star of Bethlehem by including Philipp Nicolai's 1599 Lutheran hymn "Wie schön leuchtet der Morgenstern" ("How brightly beams the morning star").

Jeffrey S. Sposato discusses both Christus and Mendelssohn's cuts in his performing version of J. S. Bach's Matthäuspassion and claims to discern an agenda in the latter to promote "the Lutheran concept of universal guilt for Christ's death" in a manner consistent with anti-Jewish sentiment, which he was able to transcend with genuine Christian sincerity in the former.

== Legacy ==
The first three movements of Christus are popular choices for church choirs to sing at the Feast of the Epiphany, often in English translation – the recitative "When Jesus our Lord…", the trio "Say, where is he…?", and "There shall a star…" (with the chorale, "How brightly beams the morning star").

== See also ==
- The Three Kings, an 1856 motet by Peter Cornelius
