= Loddfáfnir =

Character in the Eddic poem the Hávamál

Loddfáfnir is a character in the Eddic poem the Hávamál, to whom the discourse on morals, ethics, and correct action is directed.

== See also ==
- Fáfnir - A similarly named dragon from the Völsung cycle
