= Weihnachtslieder, Op. 8 (Cornelius) =

Christmas song cycle by Peter Cornelius

Weihnachtslieder
- Song cycle by Peter Cornelius
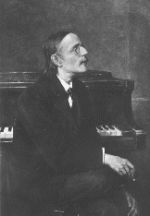
- The poet and composer
- English: Christmas Songs
- Full title: Weihnachtslieder : ein Cyklus für eine Singstimme mit Pianofortebegleitung : Op. 8 / Text und Musik von Peter Cornelius
- Opus: 8
- Text: by Cornelius
- Language: German
- Composed: 1856 – 1870
- Dedication: Elisabeth Schily
- Published: 1870
- Scoring: voice; piano

Weihnachtslieder (Christmas Songs), Op. 8, is a song cycle of six lieder related to Christmas by Peter Cornelius, who set his own poems for voice and piano between 1856 and 1870. The full title is: Weihnachtslieder : ein Cyklus für eine Singstimme mit Pianofortebegleitung : Op. 8 / Text und Musik von Peter Cornelius. Cornelius dedicated the songs to his sister, Elisabeth Schily. The song "Die Könige" about the Biblical Magi has been translated and published separately. English versions come under the title "The Three Kings". It incorporates in the piano accompaniment Philipp Nicolai's hymn "Wie schön leuchtet der Morgenstern".

== History ==
Cornelius, who was also a gifted writer and had first pursued a career as an actor, wrote the poems for the song cycle on six topics. He followed Schumann in grouping his songs around a theme. Cornelius adhered to a Protestant theology of a new Pietism, initiated by August Neander and termed Pektoraltheologie (theology of the heart). Apparently he completed the text for a cycle before he composed the music.

Cornelius composed the Weihnachtslieder for voice and piano in 1856. He revised the music in 1859 on a recommendation by Franz Liszt who also gave him ideas such as quoting the melodies of related older Christmas carols in the piano accompaniment., but was not successful finding a publisher until revising them again in 1870. After the premiere on 29 January 1871, a review in the Neue Zeitschrift für Musik noted a rich creative mind whose work reached the depth of the human soul ("Ein reicher, schöpferisch begabter Geist tritt uns darin entgegen, ein Künstler, dessen Werk unmittelbar begeisternd in das Tiefste der Menschenseele hineingreift.").

The song "Die Könige" (No. 3, "The Kings") about the Biblical Magi has become popular and has been translated and published separately, as "Three kings have come from the eastern land" and "Three Kings from Persian lands afar", among others. Some English versions are titled "The Three Kings". It was often recorded in collections of Christmas carols. The music was also arranged for choir.

== Structure ==
"Die Könige"

1. Christbaum (Christmas tree)
2. a) Die Hirten b) Die Hirten (The Shepherds)
3. a) Die Könige b) Die Könige (The Kings)
4. Simeon
5. Christus der Kinderfreund (Christ the friend of children)
6. Christkind (Christ child)

Cornelius wrote both "Die Hirten" and "Die Könige" in two versions. The second version of song "Die Könige" incorporates in the piano the melody of Philipp Nicolai's hymn "Wie schön leuchtet der Morgenstern" in slow motion.

== Publication ==
The work was published in Leipzig in 1870 by E. W. Fritzsch as Weihnachtslieder : ein Cyklus für eine Singstimme mit Pianofortebegleitung : Op. 8 / Text und Musik von Peter Cornelius. The dedication reads: "Meiner lieben Schwester Frau Elisabeth Schily." (To my dear sister Mrs. E. Sch.).

Three of the songs were arranged for choir a cappella for five to eight voices by Clytus Gottwald, published by Carus-Verlag in 2011. In "Die Hirten" Gottwald took Liszt's suggestion fürther to quote the melody of the Christmas carol "Den die Hirten lobeten sehre" ("Quem pastores laudavere", shortened to Quempas) in the choral accompaniment.
