= Old Norse philosophy =

Philosophy of the Norse peoples

Old Norse philosophy was the philosophy of the early Scandinavians. (Note: "[A]ncient Scandinavia... possessed a distinct moral philosophy which was rather clearly reflected in the life of the common man as well as in the customary law of the time. ") (Note: "Although the available sources of Old Norse philosophy, other than Hávamál are not numerous, they are reliably complete. The sagas contain much direct and even more indirect evidence of the principal points in this philosophy, as well as examples of its influence in daily life; and the Eddic poetry is the most direct and dependable proof that the Vikings embraced a philosophy of life specific in its content and explicit in formal statement.") (Note: "On level with the Sibyl's Vision in interest and significance is another Eddic poem, the Sayings of the High One (Havamal), which has been referred to as a Norse Book of Proverbs. It is largely a collection of wise precepts tersely expressed. Here we find the most direct and the most complete presentation of the Old Norse philosophy of life.")

Similar to the patterns of thought of other early Germanic peoples, Old Norse philosophy is best attested in the Poetic Edda, particularly Hávamál, which is a poem attributed to Odin, the leading deity in Norse mythology. It emphasized that happiness could only be attained through living a life of virtue, particularly one characterized by the interconnected virtues of wisdom, self-control and personal independence.

== Origins ==
Some researchers believe Old Norse philosophy was largely indigenous in origin, having developed in relative isolation independent of outside influences. It was probably of similar nature and origin to the patterns of thought of other Germanic peoples.

Scholars, such as Guðmundur Finnbogason and Sveinbjorn Johnson, have pointed out striking similarities between Old Norse philosophy and ancient Greek philosophy, in particular that of Homer and Aristotle. These similarities appear to be a result of independent development, rather than external influence.

== Sources ==
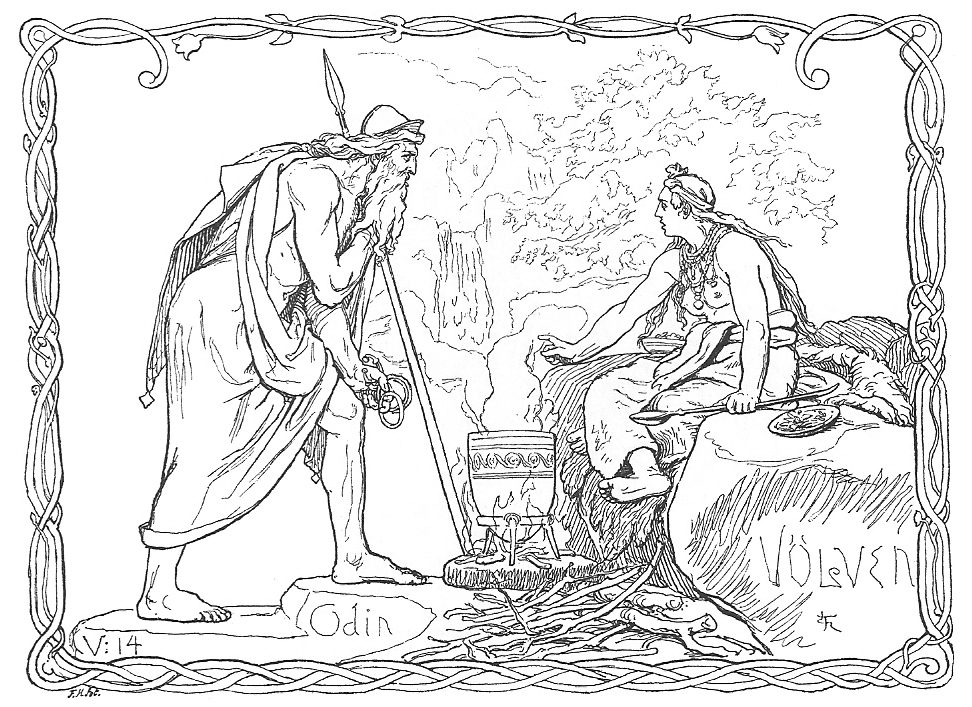
Odin and the Völva (1895) by Lorenz Frølich

The most important source of Old Norse philosophy is the Poetic Edda, which consists of a number of poems dealing with mythology, heroic legends and moral teachings. According to Lee M. Hollander, the Poetic Edda is as important for the understanding of the ethical views of the Norse and other Germanic peoples as the Vedas are for understanding Indian philosophy and the works of Homer are for understanding ancient Greek philosophy.

An important part of the Poetic Edda in regard to philosophy is its first poem, the Völuspá. It deals with the beginnings and destiny of mankind and his world.

Another important part of the Poetic Edda is the Hávamál, a poem on social conduct attributed to Odin, who was the god of war and wisdom and the leading deity in Norse mythology. It is considered the most important source on Old Norse philosophy, (Note: "The very heart of the Old Norse philosophy of life is embodied in this oft quoted and much admired stanza...") and has been referred to as the "Nicomachean Ethics of the North".

The sagas give many glimpses into the Old Norse philosophy on life.

== Themes ==
Better a homestead, though hovel it be;
a man is his master at home;
bleeding the heart of him who must beg
his meat for every meal

— Stanza 37 of Hávamál

Similarly to ancient Greek philosophy, Old Norse philosophy was independent of influence from religious dogma, and emphasized that human nature was the foundation on which the pillars of moral philosophy must rest. The aim of life is happiness, which can only be attained by living a life of virtue.

Virtues emphasized in Old Norse philosophy include independence, self-reliance, loyalty, modesty, hospitality, generosity, compassion, courage, and most importantly, wisdom. (Note: The importance of the requirement of independence and wisdom to attain happiness is particularly expressed in stanza 8 of Hávamál.) Independence was not just attained materially, but was exerted through independence of thought and action as well. Complete independence could only be attained through wisdom, and as in Aristotelian ethics, wisdom could only be acquired through experience. An important source of experience was traveling. (Note: Stanza 18 of Hávamál states that a man who always stays at home will become dull and narrow-minded, while a man who travels wide will acquire wisdom.) The author of the Hávamál points out that while wealth is temporary, wisdom is eternal. Wealth is dismissed as "the most fickle of friends". The ultimate expression of independence was one's ability to act in accordance with wisdom.

The author of Hávamál stresses, like Aristotle, that man is at heart a social being, and that he cannot develop his full potential in isolation. (Note: Stanza 50 of Hávamál states that the destiny of a solitary man is similar to the fate of a fir tree standing alone, while stanza 47 emphasizes that Odin considered himself wealthy when he finds a friend.) This deep need for fellowship is noted frequently in Old Norse literature. A man was to be a faithful friend, and was not to be on friendly terms with the friends of his enemies. The importance of fulfilling ones personal responsibilities was highly emphasized.

Wisdom is necessary

— Stanza 5 of Hávamál

A key feature of a happy man was his ability to get a good rest. This is similar to the sayings of Aristotle. In accordance with Old Norse philosophy, it was foolish to lay awake at night thinking about ones troubles, as this made one less able to deal with the problem the next day.

Despite belonging to a warrior culture, Old Norse philosophy emphasizes that even the lame, the armless, the deaf, and the blind have a particular place in society. (Note: This is stated in stanza 71 of the Hávamál.)

Old Norse philosophy was strongly fatalistic in that no man could ultimately escape his fate. This belief applied to all classes of society, from kings to thralls. This fatalism encouraged them to live a life of courage and fortitude. This spirit is famously embodied in stanza 77 of Hávamál, which emphasizes that the only lasting thing in the world is the noble name one gains by living a life filled with noble deeds.

== Legacy ==
Despite the eventual Christianization of Scandinavia and its adoption of the Christian ethics, the pillars of Old Norse philosophy remain vital to many Scandinavians.

== See also ==
- Rígsþula
- Sigrdrífumál

== Bibliography ==
- Beck, Richard (April 1933). "Iceland's Contribution To World Literature". Quarterly Journal. 23 (3). University of North Dakota: 175–184.
- Johnson, Sveinbjorn (October 1938). "Old Norse and Ancient Greek Ideals". Ethics. 49 (1). University of Chicago Press: 18–36. doi:10.1086/290042. JSTOR 2988773. S2CID 145493657.
