= Billingr =

Figure in Norse mythology

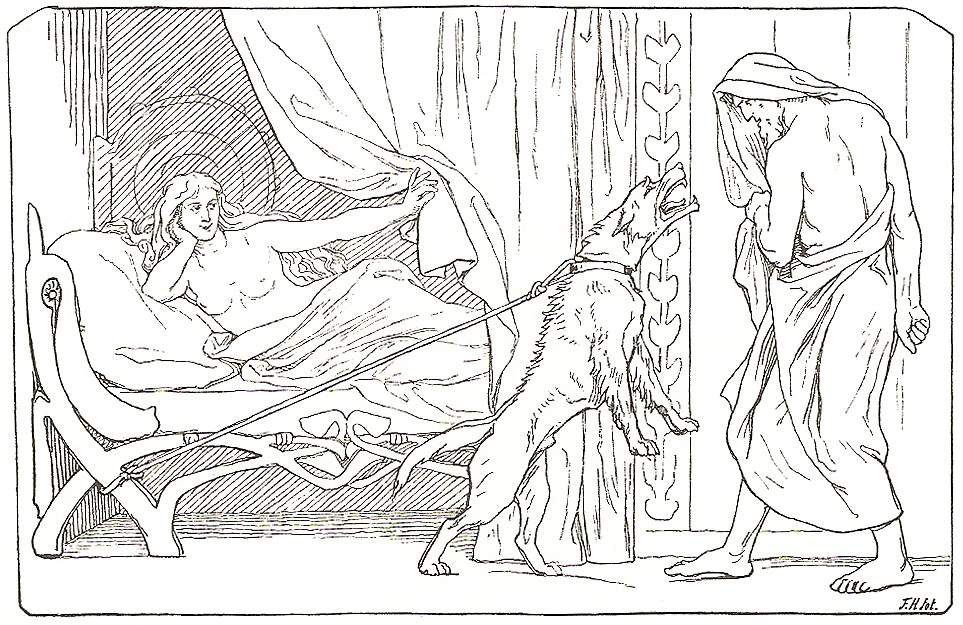
Billingr's girl watches on while Odin encounters the bitch tied to her bedpost (1895) by Lorenz Frølich.

In Norse mythology, Billingr or Billing is the father of a maiden (whose name is not provided) desired by Odin. According to stanzas 96-102 of the poem Hávamál from the Poetic Edda, Odin was told by the maiden to meet her after nightfall when it would be safest and she would give herself to him, but when Odin returned he found the path blocked by warriors with swords and burning torches. When he came back at daybreak he discovered that the maiden was gone and had left a female dog tied to the bed in her place. In this way Odin was thwarted in his attempts to possess the girl. The episode is narrated in the first person by Odin himself and used by him as an example of the supposed fickleness and deception of women, and he laments the folly of longing for that which is unobtainable.

Billingr was presumably either a giant or a dwarf, and John Lindow in Norse Mythology (2001) presents arguments for both possibilities. For example, Billing is listed as a dwarf name in the Hauksbók manuscript version of Völuspá and is found in a kenning for poetry: "cup of the son of Billing." Since the dwarves and giants both possessed the Mead of Poetry before Odin obtained it, this kenning applies whether Billing is a dwarf or a giant. On the other hand, if Billing is a dwarf, then his daughter would be one of very few female dwarves in the mythology, while Odin's relations with giantesses are well attested throughout the Eddas.
