= Heinrich Esser =

German violinist, conductor and composer

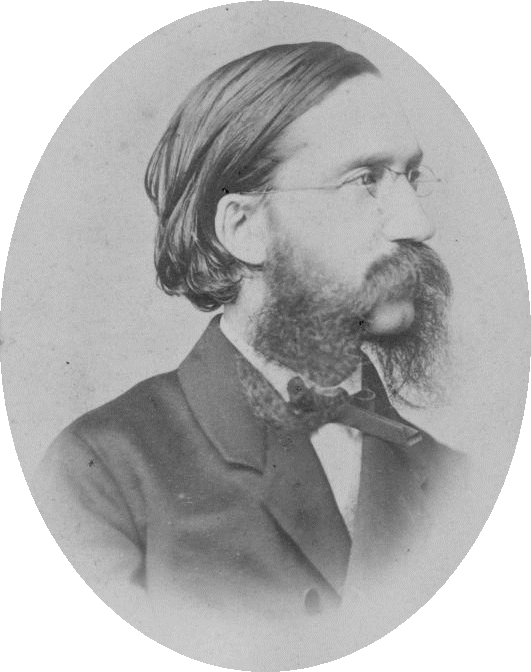
Heinrich Esser, 1869

Heinrich Joseph Esser (15 July 1818 – 3 June 1872) was a German violinist, influential conductor and composer.

== Biography ==
Heinrich Esser was born in Mannheim. He received early musical instruction from Franz Lachner who was court conductor in Mannheim from 1834. Esser followed Lachner to Munich in 1836 and subsequently went to Vienna in 1839 to complete his composition studies under Simon Sechter.

In 1840, he had a position as court conductor at the National Theatre Mannheim, but left for his new appointment as a conductor of the singing society in Mainz during the following year. During his time in Mainz, Esser was composition teacher of Peter Cornelius.

In 1847, Esser became conductor at the Vienna Court Opera which he directed temporarily in 1860/1861. He also became an honorary member of the Vienna Men's Choral Association in 1859 and conducted concerts of the Vienna Philharmonic. In the course of his activities as a consultant for the publisher Franz Schott, Esser got in contact with Richard Wagner in 1859, whose musical works he strongly supported. (He directed the Viennese first performance of Lohengrin in 1858).

In late 1869, Esser retired and relocated to Salzburg, where he died of tuberculosis in 1872.

== Works ==
Esser composed operas, five symphonies, two suites for orchestra and a large number of lieder that were largely known at their time. His two best known operas are Thomas Riquiqui oder die politische Heirath (op. 10, Text by Carl Gollmick, first performance in Frankfurt am Main, 1843) and Die zwei Prinzen (op. 15, Text by Carl Gollmick, first performance in Munich, 1845). Furthermore, his Fourth Symphony (in d-minor op. 44, 1853) and Second Suite (in a-minor op.75, 1866)

== Sources ==
- Heinrich Kábdebo (1877). "Heinrich Esser" . Allgemeine Deutsche Biographie (in German). Vol. 6. Leipzig: Duncker & Humblot. p. 382.
- Woess, Margareta (1947), Heinrich Esser. Eine Darstellung seines Lebens und Wirkens als Dirigent unter besonderer Berücksichtigung seiner Beziehung zu Richard Wagner. Dissertation University of Vienna, 3 vols.
- "Esser, Heinrich Joseph". In: Österreichisches Biographisches Lexikon 1815–1950 (ÖBL). Vol. 1, Austrian Academy of Sciences, Vienna 1957, p. 268.
- Mueller, Karl-Josef (1969), Heinrich Esser als Komponist. Dissertation University of Mainz.
- "Heinrich Esser" at Austrian Music Encyclopedia Online.
