= Hávamál =

Old Norse poem

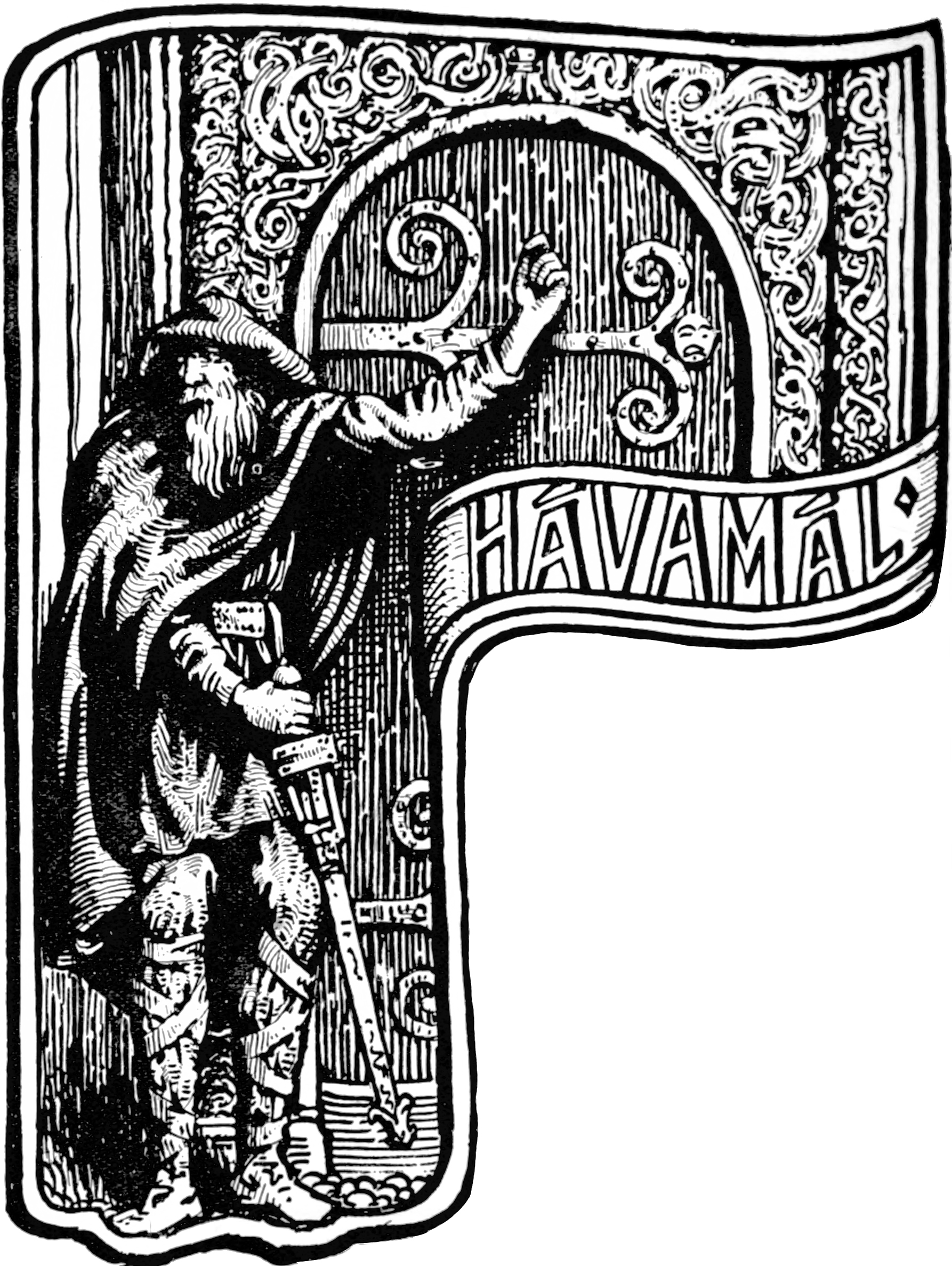
"The Stranger at the Door" (1908) by W. G. Collingwood

Hávamál ('Words of Hávi [the High One]' in Old Norse) is presented as a single poem in the Codex Regius, a collection of Old Norse poems from the Viking age. A scholarly estimate of Hávamál's age dates the poem to between 900 and 1000 AD. The poem, itself a combination of numerous shorter poems, is largely gnomic, presenting advice for living, proper conduct and wisdom. It is considered an important source of Old Norse philosophy.

The verses are attributed to Odin; the implicit attribution to Odin facilitated the accretion of various mythological material also dealing with the same deity.

For the most part composed in the metrical style known as ljóðaháttr, a metre associated with wisdom verse, Hávamál is both practical and philosophical in content. Following the gnomic "Hávamál proper" comes the Rúnatal, an account of how Odin won the runes, and the Ljóðatal, a list of magic chants or spells.

== Name ==
The Old Norse name Hávamál (Old West Norse: [ˈhɒːwaˌmɒːl], Modern Icelandic: [ˈhauːvaˌmauːl̥]; English: /ˈhɔːvəˌmɔːl/ HAW-və-mawl) is a compound of the genitive form of Hávi, which is the inflexionally weak form of Odin's name Hár ('High One'), and the plural noun mál (from older mǫ́l), and means 'Song (or Words) of the High One'.

Unnormalised spelling in the Codex Regius: hava mal (title); Nv ero Hava mál qveðin Háva hꜹllo i [...] (final stanza).

== Textual history ==
The only surviving source for Hávamál is the 13th century Codex Regius, with the exception of two short parts. (Note: The first stanza is also found in the manuscripts of the Prose Edda (in slightly different versions), and three lines of a later stanza are also found in the manuscripts of Fóstbrœðra saga (again in slightly different versions).) The part dealing with ethical conduct (the Gestaþáttr) was traditionally identified as the oldest portion of the poem by scholarship in the 19th and early 20th century. Bellows (1936) identifies as the core of the poem a "collection of proverbs and wise counsels" which dates to "a very early time", but which, by the nature of oral tradition, never had a fixed form or extent.

To the gnomic core of the poem, other fragments and poems dealing with wisdom and proverbs accreted over time. A discussion of authorship or date for the individual parts would be futile, since almost every line or stanza could have been added, altered or removed at will at any time before the poem was written down in the 13th century. Individual verses or stanzas nevertheless certainly date to as early as the 10th, or even the 9th century. Thus, the line deyr fé, deyja frændr ('cattle die, kinsmen die') found in verses 76 and 77 of the Gestaþáttr can be shown to date to the 10th century, as it also occurs in the Hákonarmál by Eyvindr skáldaspillir. The Hávamál has been described as a 10th-century poem in some sources.

== Structure ==
The Hávamál is edited in 165 stanzas by Bellows (1936). Other editions give 164 stanzas, combining Bellow's stanzas 11 and 12, as the manuscript abbreviates the last two lines of stanzas 11. Some editors also combine Bellow's stanzas 163 and 164. In the following, Bellow's numeration is used.

The poems in Hávamál is traditionally taken to consist of at least five independent parts,

1. the Gestaþáttr, or Hávamál proper, (stanzas 1–80), a collection of proverbs and gnomic wisdom
2. a dissertation on the faithlessness of women (stanzas 81–95), prefacing an account of the love-story of Odin and the daughter of Billingr (stanzas 96–102) and the story of how Odin got the mead of poetry from the maiden Gunnlöð (stanzas 103–110)
3. the Loddfáfnismál (stanzas 111–138), a collection of gnomic verses similar to the Gestaþáttr, addressed to a certain Loddfáfnir
4. the Rúnatal (stanzas 139–146), an account of how Odin won the runes, introductory to the Ljóðatal
5. the Ljóðatal (stanzas 147–165), a collection of charms

Stanzas 6 and 27 are expanded beyond the standard four lines by an additional two lines of "commentary". Bellow's edition inverses the manuscript order of stanzas 39 and 40. Bellow's stanza 138 (Ljóðalok) is taken from the very end of the poem in the manuscript, placed before the Rúnatal by most editors following Müllenhoff. Stanzas 65, 73–74, 79, 111, 133–134, 163 are defective.

Stanzas 81–84 are in málaháttr, 85–88 in fornyrðislag. The entire section of 81–102 appears to be an ad hoc interpolation. Stanza 145 is also an interpolation in málaháttr.

== Contents ==
=== Gestaþáttr ===
The first section Gestaþáttr, the "guest's section". Stanzas 1 through 79 comprise a set of maxims for how to handle oneself when a guest and traveling, focusing particularly on manners and other behavioral relationships between hosts and guests and the sacred lore of reciprocity and hospitality to the Norse pagans.

The first stanza exemplifies the practical behavioral advice it offers:

Gattir allar,
aþr gangi fram,
vm scoðaz scyli,
vm scygnaz scyli;
þviat ouist er at vita,
hvar ovinir sitia
a fleti fyr (Note: Quoted after the Codex Regius.)

Translation:

All the entrances, before you walk forward,
you should look at,
you should spy out;
for you can't know for certain where enemies are sitting,
ahead in the hall

Number 77 is possibly the most known section of Gestaþáttr:

Deyr fę,
deyia frǫndr,
deyr sialfr it sama;
ec veit einn
at aldri deýr:
domr vm dꜹþan hvern.

Translation:

Cattle die,
kinsmen die,
all men are mortal;
but words of praise will never perish
nor a noble name.

=== On women ===
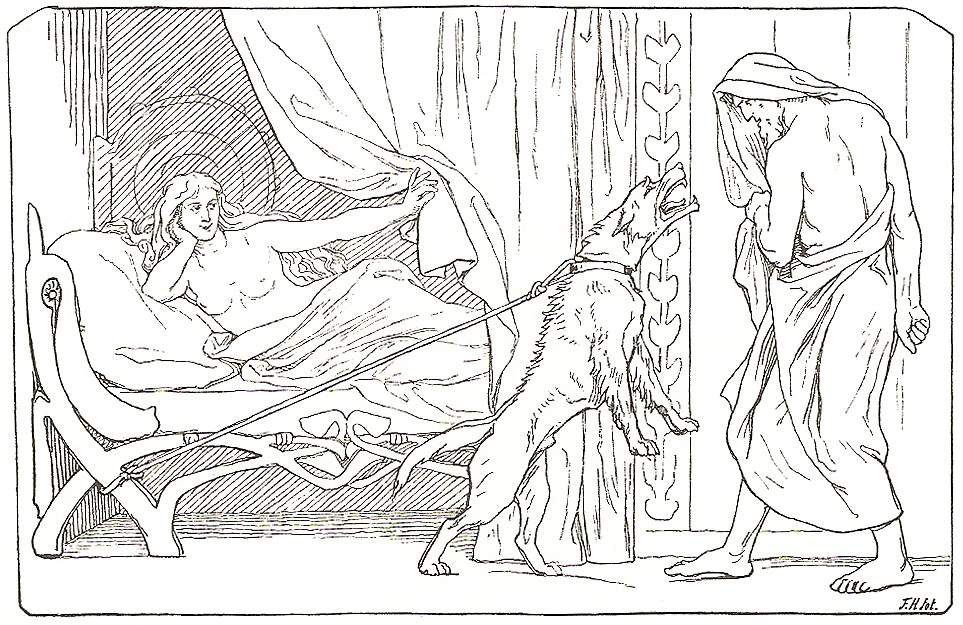
Billingr's girl watches on while Odin encounters the bitch tied to her bedpost (1895) by Lorenz Frølich.

Stanzas 83 to 110 deal with the general topic of romantic love and the character of women.

It is introduced by a discussion of the faithlessness of women and advice for the seducing of them in stanzas 84–95, followed by two mythological accounts of Odin's interaction with women also known as "Odin's Examples" or "Odin's Love Quests". The first is an account of Odin's thwarted attempt of possessing the daughter of Billing (stanzas 96–102), followed by the story of the mead of poetry which Odin won by seducing its guardian, the maiden Gunnlöð (stanzas 103–110).

=== Loddfáfnismál ===
The Loddfáfnismál (stanzas 111–138) is again gnomic, dealing with morals, ethics, correct action and codes of conduct. The section is directed to Loddfáfnir.

=== Rúnatal ===
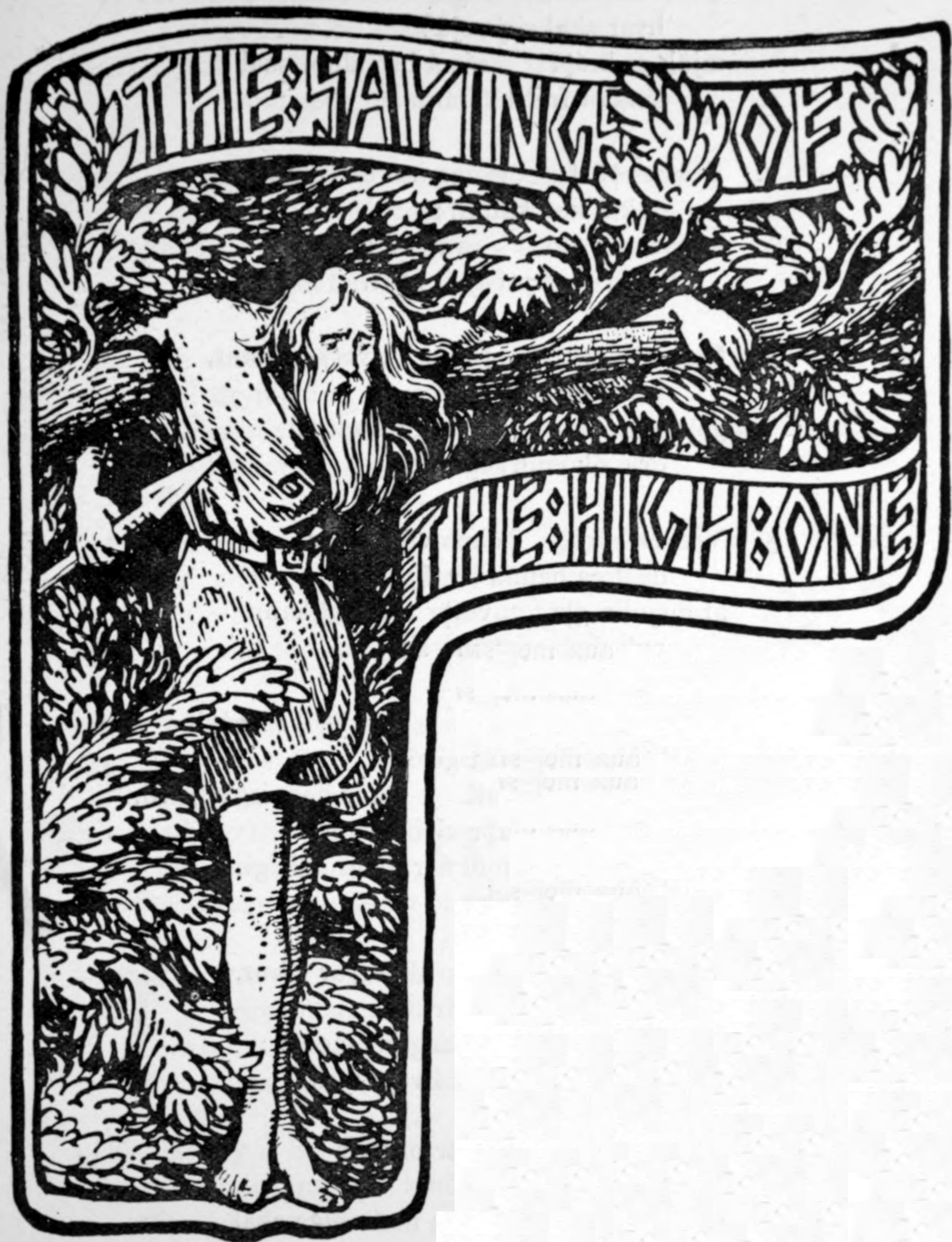
"Odin's Self-sacrifice" (1908) by W. G. Collingwood.

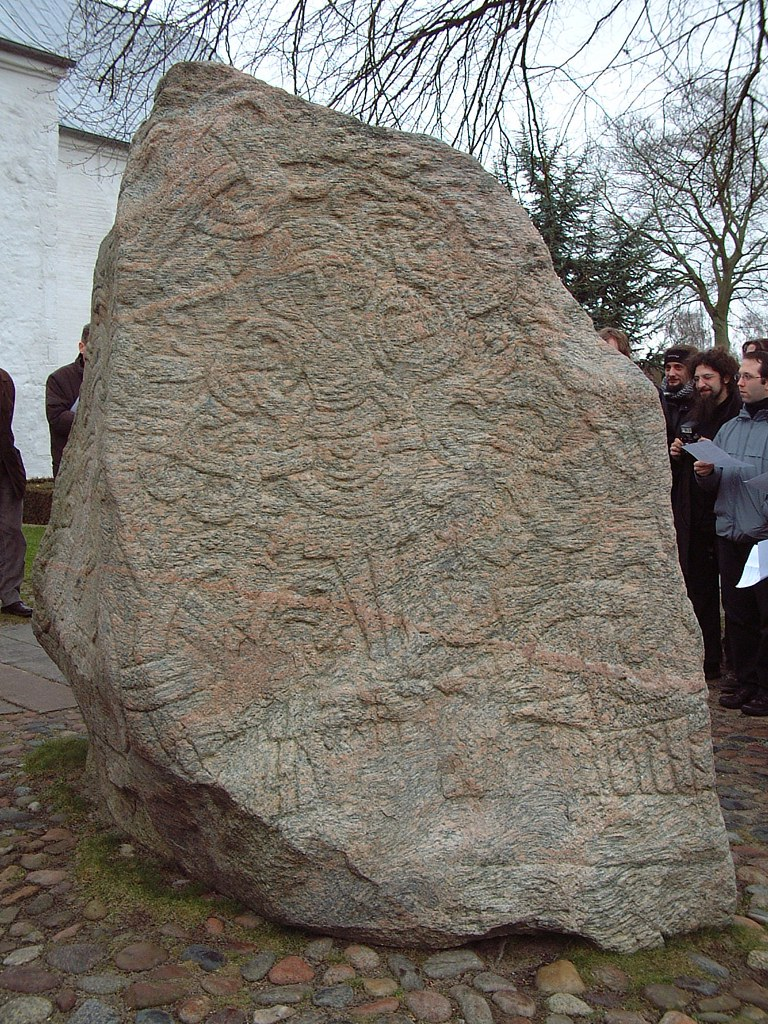
The younger Jelling stone (erected by Harald Bluetooth c. 970) shows the crucifixion of Christ with the victim suspended in the branches of a tree instead of on a cross.

Rúnatal or Óðins Rune Song, Rúnatáls-þáttr-Óðins (stanzas 139–146) is a section of the Hávamál where Odin reveals the origins of the runes. In stanzas 139 and 140, Odin describes his sacrifice of himself to himself:

Vęit ec at ec hecc
vindga meiði a
nętr allar nío,
geiri vndaþr
oc gefinn Oðni,
sialfr sialfom mer,
a þeim meiþi,
er mangi veit,
hvers hann af rótom renn.

Við hleifi mic seldo
ne viþ hórnigi,
nysta ec niþr,
nam ec vp rv́nar,
ǫpandi nam,
fęll ec aptr þatan.

Translation:

I know that I hung on a windy tree
nine long nights,
wounded with a spear, dedicated to Odin,
myself to myself,
on that tree of which no man knows from where its roots run.

No bread did they give me nor a drink from a horn,
downwards I peered;
I took up the runes,
screaming I took them,
then I fell back from there.

The "windy tree" from which the victim hangs is often identified with the world tree Yggdrasil by commentators. The entire scene, the sacrifice of a god to himself, the execution method by hanging the victim on a tree, and the wound inflicted on the victim by a spear, is often compared to the crucifixion of Christ as narrated in the gospels.

The parallelism of Odin and Christ during the period of open co-existence of Christianity and Norse paganism in Scandinavia from the 9th to 12th centuries, corresponding with the assumed horizon of the poem's composition, also appears in other sources. To what extent this parallelism is an incidental similarity of the mode of human sacrifice offered to Odin and the crucifixion, and to what extent a Pagan influence on Christianity, has been discussed by scholars such as Sophus Bugge.

The persistence of Odin's self-sacrifice in Scandinavian folk tradition was documented by Bugge (1889) in a poem from Unst on the Shetland Islands:

Nine days he hang' pa de rütless tree;
For ill wis da folk, in' güd wis he.
A blüdy mael wis in his side —
Made wi' a lance — 'at wid na hide.
Nine lang nichts, i' de nippin rime,
Hang he dare wi' his naeked limb.
Some dey leuch;
Bid idders gret.

=== Ljóðatal ===
The last section, the Ljóðatal enumerates 18 songs (ljóð), sometimes called "charms", prefaced with (stanza 147):

Lioþ ec þꜹ kann,
er kannat þioðans kóna
oc mannzcis mꜹgr"

Translation:

The songs I know
that king's wives know not
Nor men that are sons of men.

The songs themselves are not given, just their application or effect described. They are explicitly counted from "the first" in stanza 147, and "a second" to "an eighteenth" in stanzas 148 to 165, given in Roman numerals in the manuscript.

There is no explicit mention of runes or runic magic in the Ljóðatal excepting in the twelfth song (stanza 158), which takes up the motif of Odin hanging on the tree and its association with runes:

sva ec rist
oc i rv́nom fác

Translation:

So do I write
and color the runes

Nevertheless, because of the Rúnatal preceding the list, modern commentators sometimes reinterpret the Ljóðatal as referring to runes, specifically with the 16 letters of the Younger Futhark.

Müllenhoff takes the original Ljóðatal to have ended with stanza 161, with the final three songs (16th to 18th) taken as late and obscure additions.

== Influence ==
Sveinbjörn Beinteinsson, leader of the Icelandic Ásatrúarfélagið, published his performance of a number of Eddaic poems, including the Hávamál, chanted in rímur style.

The opera Gunlöd by Peter Cornelius takes its plot from the Hávamál; detailing Odin's theft of the mead of poetry.

The German viking-pagan metal band Falkenbach formed in 1989 and recorded their first demo, titled Hávamál, and incorporate lines from the poem into lyrics.

== Editions and translations ==
- editio princeps: Peder Hansen Resen, Edda. Islandorum an. Chr. 1215 islandice conscripta, 1665 (Google Books).
- Peter Andreas Munch, Carl Rikard Unger, Den Ældre Edda: Samling af norrøne oldkvad, indeholdende Nordens ældste gude- og helte-sagn, Christiania: P. T. Malling, 1847 (Internet Archive)
- Benjamin Thorpe, Edda Sæmundar Hinns Froða: The Edda Of Sæmund The Learned, 1866 (online transcription).
- Sophus Bugge, Sæmundar Edda hins fróða. Christiania: P. T. Malling, 1867.
- Olive Bray, The Elder or Poetic Edda, commonly known as Sæmund's Edda, part I: The Mythological Poems, London: Printed for the Viking Club, 1908, pp. 61–111 (online transcription).
- H. A. Bellows, The Poetic Edda, 1936, "Hovamol: The Ballad of the High One" (online edition).
- Carolyne Larrington, The Poetic Edda, Oxford University Press, 2006.
- Jackson Crawford, The Poetic Edda, Hackett Publishing Company, Inc., 2015.
- Jackson Crawford, The Wanderer's Hávamál, 2019

== See also ==
- Nine Herbs Charm
- Noleby Runestone
