= Jackson Crawford =

American Old Norse scholar (born 1985)

- Crawford in 2024
- Born: August 28, 1985 (age 41); Houston, Texas, US
- Occupations: YouTuber, translator

Academic background
- Education: Texas Tech University (BA); University of Georgia (MA); University of Wisconsin–Madison (PhD)

Academic work
- Discipline: Scandinavian studies
- Sub-discipline: Old Norse; Linguistics; Norse mythology
- Institutions: University of California, Los Angeles; University of California, Berkeley; University of Colorado Boulder
- Website: https://jacksonwcrawford.com/

Jackson W. Crawford (born August 28, 1985) is an American scholar, translator, and poet who specializes in Old Norse. He previously taught at University of Colorado, Boulder (2017–2020), University of California, Berkeley (2014–2017), and University of California, Los Angeles (2011–2014). Crawford has a YouTube channel focused on Old Norse language, literature, and mythology.

== Life and career ==
Jackson Crawford is a former Instructor of Nordic Studies, and Coordinator of the Nordic Program. Crawford taught courses in the Old Norse language, Norse mythology, and the history of the Scandinavian languages. He received B.A. in Classics and Classical Languages, Literatures, and Linguistics from Texas Tech University; an M.A. in Linguistics from the University of Georgia (focusing on Indo-European historical linguistics); and a Ph.D. in Scandinavian Studies from the University of Wisconsin, Madison (specializing in Old Norse).

He was a consultant for the Disney movies Frozen (2013) and Frozen 2 (2019).

In 2015 he published a translation of the Poetic Edda. His stated goal was to make an accessible translation for readers primarily interested in mythology rather than poetry or textual scholarship. The translated poems are rendered in free verse. In 2017 he published his translations of the Saga of the Volsungs and the Saga of Ragnar Lothbrok in one volume. His book The Wanderer's Hávamál (2019) includes the Old Norse text of the poem Hávamál with Crawford's page-facing English translation along with commentary, a few brief Old Norse texts about Odin, and the Cowboy Hávamál, which is Crawford's translation of Gestaþáttr into his grandfather's dialect. Matthew Coker, reviewing the volume in The Medieval Review, called the Cowboy Hávamál a "refreshingly unique take on the poem" that brings "its hard natural and human world to life". Crawford has also contributed to the 2020 video game Assassin's Creed: Valhalla, where he consulted on topics mainly centered around linguistics.

Crawford is a public educator on his YouTube channel where he lectures on Old Norse language and discusses literature and mythology. He says there is a great interest in Old Norse material, but much of what can be found on the Internet is unreliable, and he wants to provide accessible information that is separate from both popular culture and mystical practices. Most of his YouTube videos are filmed in the natural outdoors of Wyoming or Colorado with him wearing a cowboy hat.

== Bibliography ==
- Crawford, Jackson (2015), The Poetic Edda: Stories of the Norse Gods and Heroes, Indianapolis, Indiana: Hackett Publishing Company, ISBN 9781624663567
- Crawford, Jackson (2017), The Saga of the Volsungs: With the Saga of Ragnar Lothbrok, Indianapolis, Indiana: Hackett Publishing Company, ISBN 9781624666339
- Crawford, Jackson (2019), The Wanderer's Hávamál, Indianapolis, Indiana: Hackett Publishing Company, ISBN 9781624668357
- Crawford, Jackson (2021), Two Sagas of Mythical Heroes: Hervor and Heidrek and Hrólf Kraki and His Champions, Indianapolis, Indiana: Hackett Publishing Company, ISBN 978-1624669958
