= Peter Cornelius =

German composer (1824–1874)

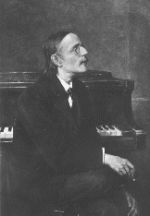
- Born: 24 December 1824; Mainz, Grand Duchy of Hesse, German Confederation
- Died: 26 October 1874 (aged 49); Mainz, Grand Duchy of Hesse, Germany
- Occupations: Composer; poet; translator

Carl August Peter Cornelius (24 December 1824 – 26 October 1874) was a German composer, writer about music, poet and translator.

== Early life and education ==
He was born in Mainz to Carl Joseph Gerhard (1793–1843) and Friederike (1789–1867) Cornelius, actors in Mainz and Wiesbaden. From an early age he played the violin and composed, eventually studying composition with Heinrich Esser in 1841. He lived with his painter uncle Peter von Cornelius in Berlin from 1844 to 1852, and during this time he met prominent figures such as Alexander von Humboldt, the Brothers Grimm, Friedrich Rückert and Felix Mendelssohn.

== Career ==
His early compositions included chamber and church music and secular songs, among which stands the Stabat Mater for soloists, choir, and orchestra, composed in 1849. Cornelius's first mature works (including the opera Der Barbier von Bagdad) were composed during his brief stay in Weimar (1852–1858). His next place of residence was Vienna, where he lived for five years. It was in Vienna that Cornelius began a friendship with Richard Wagner. At the latter's behest, Cornelius moved to Munich in 1864, where he married and fathered four children.

During his last few years in Berlin, Cornelius wrote music criticism for several major Berlin journals and entered into friendships with Joseph von Eichendorff, Paul Heyse and Hans von Bülow. Despite his long-standing association with Wagner and Franz Liszt (the latter on occasion sought Cornelius's advice when it came to matters of orchestration), Cornelius's relations with the so-called "New German School" of composition were sometimes rocky. For instance, he did not attend the premiere of Tristan und Isolde, using the premiere of his own opera Der Cid as an excuse.

Cornelius's third and final operatic project, Gunlöd, based on the Norse eddas, was left incomplete at his death (from diabetes) in Mainz. He was buried in the city's Hauptfriedhof, and his grave can still be seen there.

== Legacy ==
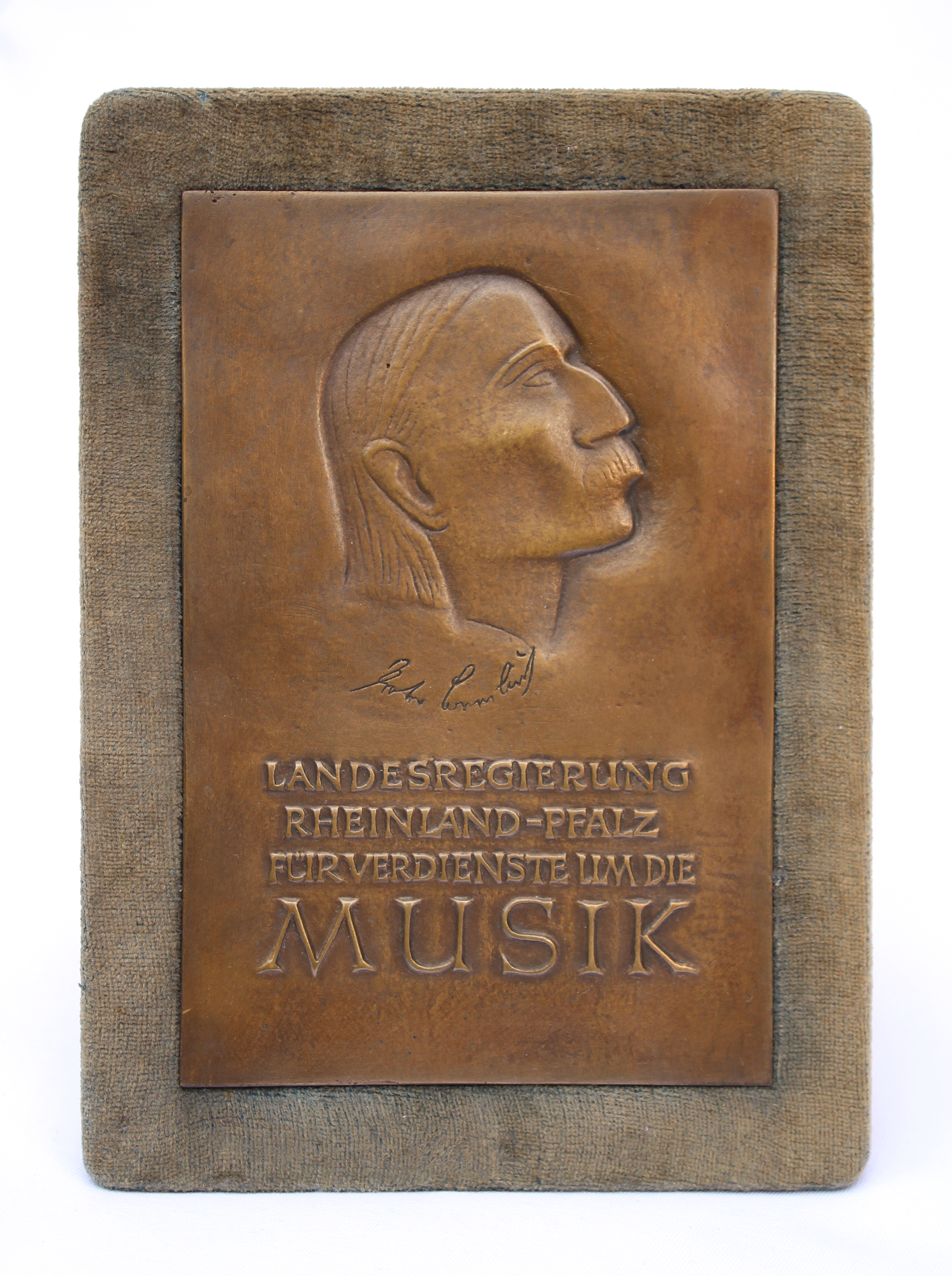
Plaque of Peter Cornelius Award

The Mainz Conservatory was renamed the Peter Cornelius Conservatory in 1936. The state of Rhineland-Palatinate honors musical achievements with the Peter Cornelius Award since 1951.

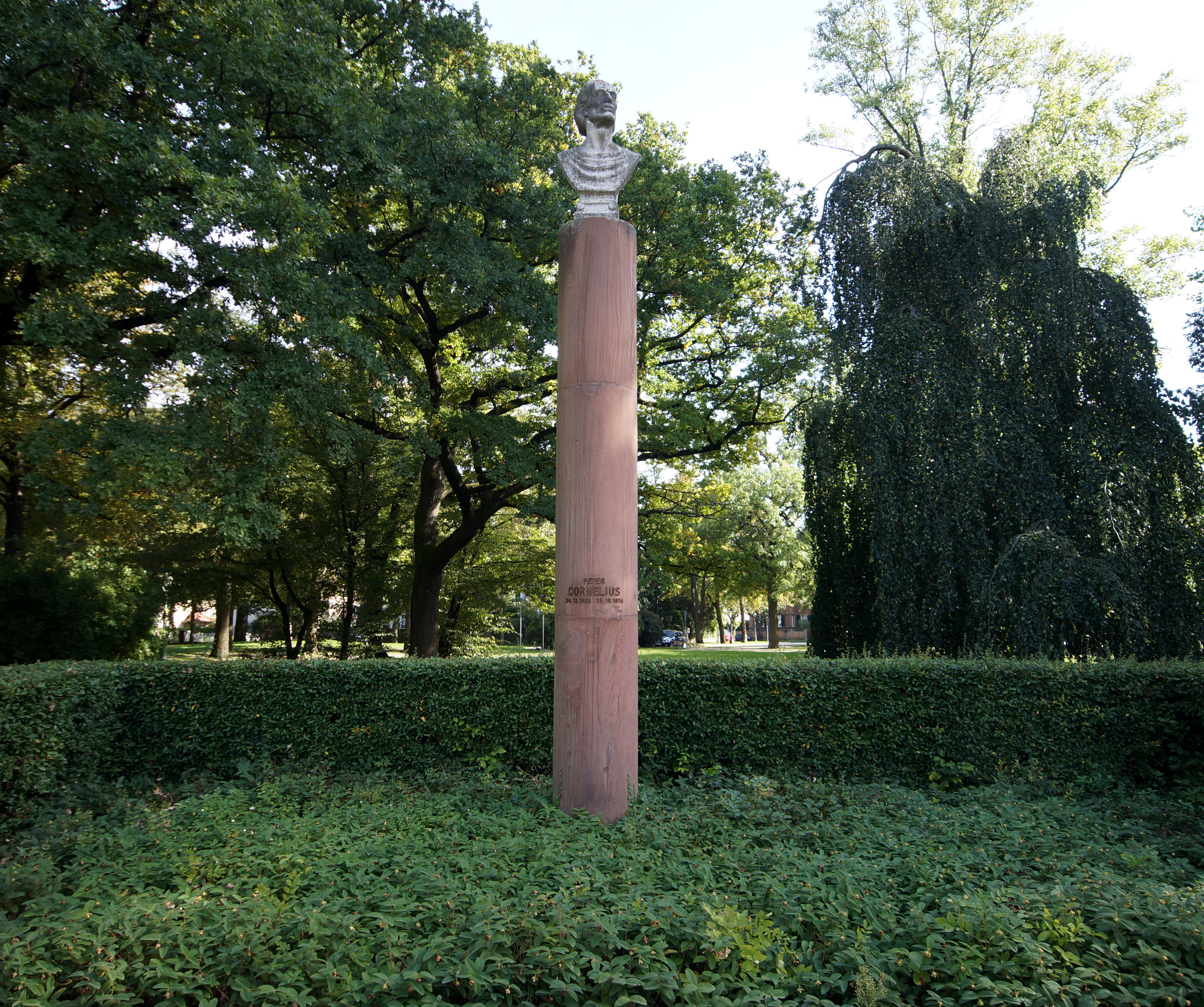
Bust of Peter Cornelius, Park Drususwall, Mainz.

A bust created by Hugo Lederer in 1930 is displayed in Park Drususwall, Mainz.

Several streets and squares are named after him in Mainz (Peter-Cornelius-Platz) and across other German cities such as Berlin, Frankfurt am Main, Augsburg and Weimar, as well as in Vienna, Salzburg, and Waalwijk, Netherlands.

The Peter Cornelius Archive is an extensive collection maintained by the Mainz City Library, consisting of the composer’s personal items, documents, and musical works. It includes around 50 original music manuscripts, 58 notebooks with diaries, sketches, and poems, personal memorabilia like death masks, and over 2,600 letters. The archive, enriched by contributions from Cornelius's family, is open to the public for research.

In Britain to this day, Cornelius's best-known work is "The Three Kings" ("Die Könige"), a song for solo voice and piano originally from his 1856 song cycle, Weihnachtslieder. The song's melody line is accompanied by the chorale tune of "Wie schön leuchtet der Morgenstern" ("How brightly shines the morning star"), written by Philipp Nicolai in 1597. An English translation made in 1928 by H.N. Bate ("Three Kings from Persian lands afar...") was arranged by Ivor Atkins in 1957 for solo voice and choir, and this version was included in the first volume of the popular David Willcocks and Reginald Jacques compilation Carols for Choirs in 1961.

== Selected works ==
- Stabat mater for soloists, chorus and orchestra (1849)
- Brautlieder (1856)

"Die Könige", from: Weihnachtslieder Opus 8,3. The accompanying piano plays the chorale Wie schön leuchtet der Morgenstern.

- Weihnachtslieder, Op. 8 (1856)
- Der Barbier von Bagdad, opera buffa (1858)
- Der Cid, opera (1865)
- Requiem ("Seele, vergiß sie nicht"), after a poem of Hebbel (1872)
- String quartets
- Gunlöd, unfinished opera in three acts based on the story Hávamál in the version found in the Edda; completed by Karl Hoffbauer for its 1879 publication; premiered at the Hoftheater Weimar on 6 May 1891 with new orchestrations by Eduard Lassen. A different completed version by Max Hass (vocal score) and Waldemar von Baußnern (orchestrations) premiered on 15 December 1906 at the Cologne Opera.
- Mass in D minor, CWV 91 for two soloists, chorus and organ, strings

== See also ==
- Three Bs, a term coined by Cornelius

== Cited sources ==
- Chisholm, Hugh, ed. (1911). "Cornelius, Carl August Peter" . Encyclopædia Britannica. Vol. 7 (11th ed.). Cambridge University Press. pp. 167–168.
