= Gunlöd (opera) =

Gunlöd is an opera in three acts by composer Peter Cornelius. Cornelius also authored the work's libretto which is based on the story of Hávamál in the version found in the Edda, a literary work from Medieval Iceland which details Old Norse legends. The opera's story and psychology has some striking similarities to Richard Wagner's Ring Cycle; with the opera Lohengrin being a clear influence.

== Roles ==
- Odin (tenor)
- Suttung (bass)
- Gunnlöd (mezzo-soprano)
- Hela (contralto)

== Plot ==
Odin, the god of light, transforms himself into a worm in order to sneak into the giant Suttung's castle to steal the Mead of Poetry; a powerful drink which grants unlimited knowledge and insight. Suttung's daughter, Gunnlöd, warns him of Odin's presence and he according hides his golden goblet that is filled with the special mead. Odin seduces Gunnlöd, and she gives him the mead after he wins her heart. He flees. Suttung and Gunnlöd tragically die as punishment for losing the Mead of Poetry.

== History ==
Peter Cornelius began composing Gunlöd in 1866, and continued to labor on it until his death eight years later in 1874. It was unfinished with none of the opera orchestrated, but with the piano score of the entire first act and the majority of the second act finished. Of the third act music, Cornelius had only composed the piano score for the wedding songs sung by the character Suttung. The composer Karl Hoffbauer completed the opera, and it is this version which was published in 1879.

The Belgian-Danish composer Eduard Lassen re-orchestrated the opera for its world premiere production which took place at the Hoftheater Weimar on May 6, 1891. Three years later Max Hasse re-worked a new vocal score from Cornelius's original manuscript. He later asked Waldemar von Baußnern to help him complete his version with Baußnern contributing new orchestral arrangements to Hasse's vocal score. This version of the opera was given its premiere on 15 December 1906 at the Cologne Opera. Hasse and Baußnern's version of the opera was performed in a concert version at the Staatstheater Mainz in 2024 with conductor Hermann Bäumer leading the musical forces.
