= Paul Manz =

American musician

Paul Otto Manz (May 10, 1919 – October 28, 2009), was an American composer for choir and organ. His most famous choral work is the Advent motet "E'en So, Lord Jesus, Quickly Come", which has been performed at the Festival of Nine Lessons and Carols at King's College, Cambridge, though its broadcast by the neighboring Choir of St John's College, Cambridge, in its Advent Carol Service precipitated its popularity.

His most famous organ works are his volumes of neo-Baroque chorale preludes and partitas. Manz long served the church as recitalist, composer, teacher, and leader in worship. He was Cantor Emeritus at the Evangelical Lutheran Church of Saint Luke in Chicago, Illinois, as well as Cantor Emeritus of Mount Olive Lutheran Church in Minneapolis, Minnesota. He was the director of the Paul Manz Institute of Church Music, and was Professor Emeritus of Church Music at Christ Seminary-Seminex at the Lutheran School of Theology at Chicago.

== Biography ==
Manz was born to Otto and Hulda (Jeske) Manz in Cleveland, Ohio. Trained as an educator at Concordia Teacher's College in River Forest, Illinois (now Concordia University Chicago) and he earned a master's degree in Music at Northwestern University.

A Fulbright grant enabled him to study with Flor Peeters in Belgium and Helmut Walcha in Germany. The Belgian government invited him to be the official United States representative in ceremonies honoring Peeters on his 80th birthday and his 60th year as titular organist of the Cathedral of Saint Rombout in Mechelen, Belgium. At that time, Peeters referred to his former student as ‘my spiritual son.’

Manz concertized extensively in North America. He appeared at Lincoln Center in New York City, with the National Symphony Orchestra, under conductor Geoffrey Simon, at the Kennedy Center in Washington, D.C., with the Chicago Symphony Orchestra at Orchestra Hall and with the Minnesota Orchestra under the direction of Charles Dutoit, Leonard Slatkin, and Henry Charles Smith. In addition, he played recitals in churches and cathedrals in the U.S. and abroad. He was in great demand for his hymn festivals, which are his legacy as a church musician. He conducted many organ clinics, participated in liturgical seminars, and appeared as lecturer and recitalist at the regional and national conventions of the American Guild of Organists.

The esteem and respect with which Manz is regarded can be seen in the many honors he received. He was twice named one of the "Ten Most Influential Lutherans", served as National Councilor of the American Guild of Organists, and is listed as one of the "101 Most Notable Organists of the 20th Century". He was the recipient of many honorary doctorates and awards. Northwestern University, his alma mater, presented him with its "Alumni Merit Award, the Lutheran School of Theology at Chicago presented him with the "Confessor of Christ Award", the Chicago Bible Society presented him with the "Gutenberg Award", and the Lutheran Institute of Washington, DC honored him with the first "Wittenberg Arts Award". At a convention of the Association of Lutheran Church Musicians, his colleagues honored him for his work in the church. A large gathering in Minneapolis held a "Paul Manz Celebration: Honoring the Life of a Church Musician" where substantial gifts were given to the Ruth and Paul Manz Scholarship for Church Musicians.

Trinity Seminary of Columbus, Ohio, bestowed the "Joseph Sittler Award for Theological Leadership" and among his many honorary doctorates are the Doctor of Sacred Music degree from Valparaiso University, and most recently, the Doctor of Music degree from St. Olaf College, Northfield, Minnesota.

As a performer, Manz was most famous for his hymn festivals. Instead of playing traditional organ recitals, Manz would generally lead a "festival" of hymns from the organ, in which he introduced each hymn with one of his creative organ improvisations based on the hymn tune in question. The congregation would then sing the hymn with his accompaniment. Sometimes he would play an improvisation between each sung stanza, as with his well-known variations on the tune, St. Anne, sung to the Isaac Watts text "Oh God, Our Help in Ages Past" with which he would end each festival. Many volumes of these improvisations have been written out and published and are played by church organists throughout the world.

From 1957 until 1976, while continuing to serve at Mt. Olive, Manz was called to Concordia College, St. Paul (now Concordia University, St. Paul), as professor and chair of the Division of Fine Arts. He left that position in 1976 to return to full-time parish service at Mt. Olive as its cantor. During his time there Paul developed the hymn festival for which he eventually became known throughout the world. Having heard his first hymn festival in 1945, Paul recast the format, adding the unique approach of bringing a number of hymns together under a theme with appropriate readings interspersed. He also brought back the ancient practice of alternation during the singing of hymns. He started doing this at weekly services at Mt. Olive, eventually exposing a wider audience to it through hymn festivals.

His idea for the hymn festival began to germinate when he presented annual organ recitals at Mt. Olive: "I would always begin and end with a hymn; many people would come to those recitals, and I found that they thoroughly enjoyed singing the hymns. So finally, instead of doing a recital with a hymn at the beginning and the end, I did a program with hymns only. It caught on like wildfire, and I have subsequently presented hymn festivals all over the world."

== Selected works ==
His musical compositions are internationally known. His organ works are extensively used in worship services, recitals and in teaching. His choral music is widely used by church and college choirs here and abroad. His motet, "E'en So, Lord Jesus, Quickly Come" is regarded as a classic and has been frequently recorded. His life and works are the subject of a doctoral dissertation which details his career spanning more than fifty years and analyzes his organ works.
