= The Three Kings =

Song composed by Peter Cornelius

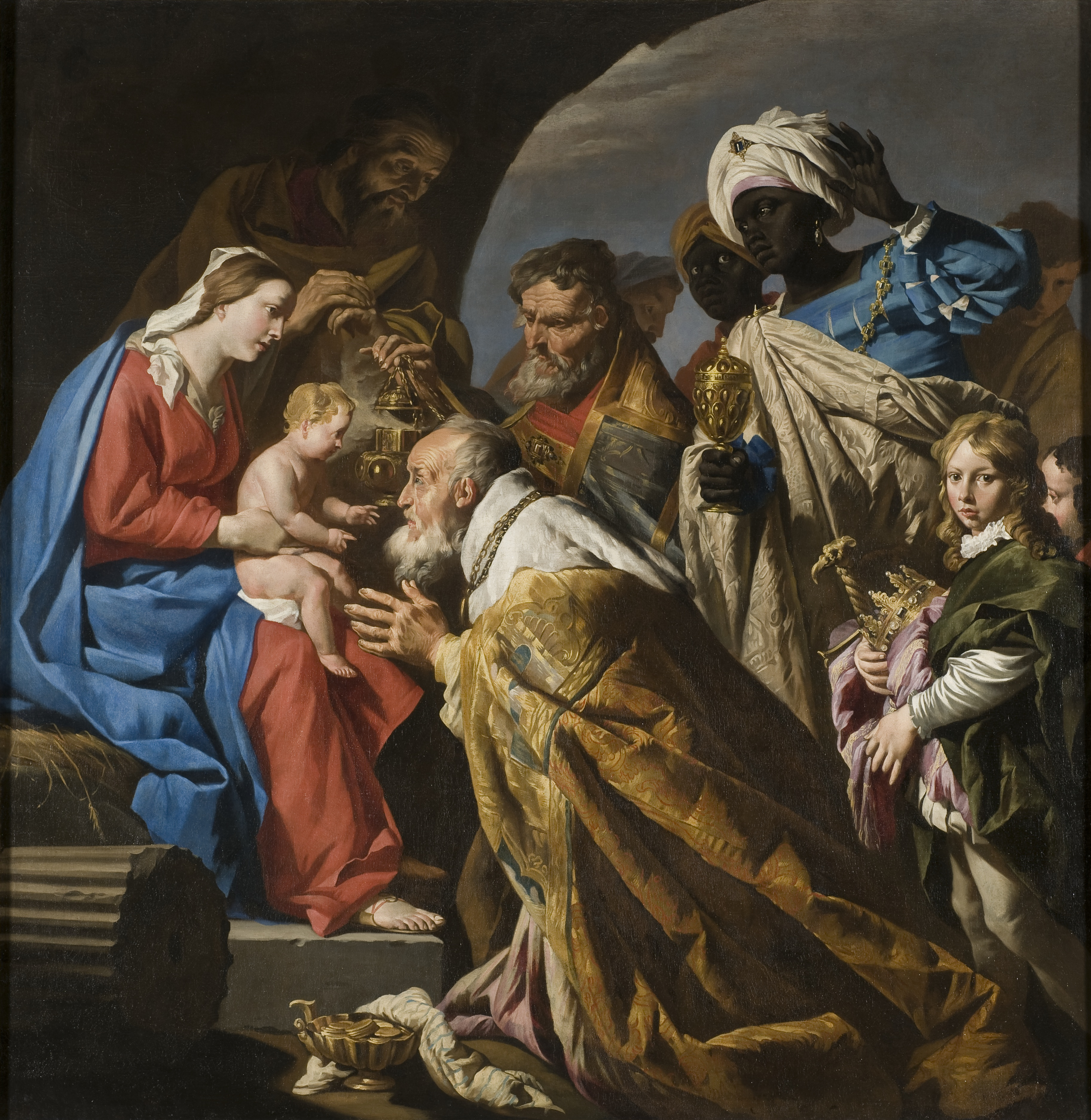
- The Adoration of the Magi by Matthias Stom
- Native name: Die Könige
- Year: 1856
- Genre: Christmas/Lied
- Form: Solo voice and piano Arrangement for SATB choir
- Language: German
- Melody: Peter Cornelius
- Song from Weihnachtslieder, Op. 8

"The Three Kings", or "Three Kings From Persian Lands Afar", is a Christmas carol by the German composer Peter Cornelius. He set "Die Könige" for a vocal soloist, accompanied by Philip Nicolai's hymn "Wie schön leuchtet der Morgenstern" ("How Brightly Shines the Morning Star"), which he erroneously thought was an Epiphany hymn. In fact, it is an Advent hymn in which the morning star is an allegory for the arrival of Jesus, not the Star of Bethlehem. In Cornelius' original second setting, the accompaniment was played on a piano but the English organist Ivor Atkins later arranged the accompaniment for choir, with the choir singing the words of the original hymn. The German words have been translated into English by H.N. Bate. The carol describes the visit of the Biblical Magi to the Infant Jesus during the Nativity and is also used as an Epiphany anthem.

== History ==
"Die Könige", from: Weihnachtslieder Opus 8,3

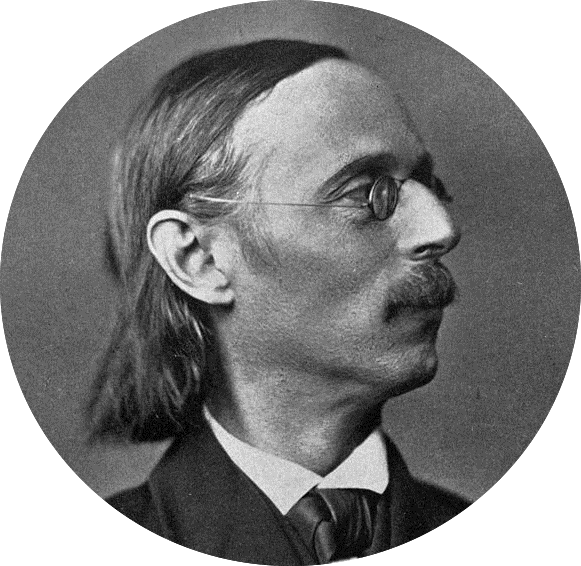
Composer Peter Cornelius

Cornelius wrote his first version of the German hymn "Die Könige" in 1856 as part of Weihnachtslieder, Op. 8, for a solo voice and piano. This first setting of the text, which does not cite Nicolai's hymn, was published posthumously in 1905 and remained relatively unknown. In 1859 he composed a completely new version again for soloist and piano, using the 16th-century chorale "Wie schön leuchtet der Morgenstern" ("How Brightly Shines the Morning Star") by Philipp Nicolai in the piano accompaniment after a suggestion from Franz Liszt. This version was again revised in 1870 before publication.

== Publication ==
The hymn was originally translated into English in 1916 by W. G. Rothery, as "Three Kings had journey'd from lands afar", and published in Carols Old and Carols New.

A more commonly used English translation, including references to the Magi being from Persian lands, was made in 1928 by H.N. Bate for the "Oxford Book of Carols". The original piano accompaniment by Cornelius was transcribed various times for choir, notably in the 1957 arrangement for solo voice and choir by Ivor Atkins, organist at Worcester Cathedral. This version was included in the first volume of the popular 1961 collection compiled by David Willcocks and Reginald Jacques, Carols for Choirs.

Another arrangement for choir a cappella for five to eight voices was written by Clytus Gottwald in 2011. "The Three Kings" was included in a Nick Hern Books adapted publication of Charles Dickens' A Christmas Carol. In 2016, the carol was included by the head of chapel music at Winchester College, Malcolm Archer, in the 2016 publication of the Carols Ancient and Modern" hymnal.

== See also ==
- List of Christmas carols
