= E'en So, Lord Jesus, Quickly Come =

1953 motet by Ruth and Paul Manz

"E'en So, Lord Jesus, Quickly Come" is a 1953 motet composed by Paul Manz with lyrics adapted by Ruth Manz. The piece is adapted from text found in the Book of Revelation. It is known as Paul Manz's most notable composition and has been frequently performed by numerous ensembles and choral groups such as the King's College Choir, who are thought to have popularized it.

== Composition ==
Paul and Ruth Manz wrote "E'en So, Lord Jesus, Quickly Come" in 1953 during a time when their three-year-old son was critically ill. Reflecting on the time, Ruth Manz reported, "I think we'd reached the point where we felt that time was certainly running out so we committed it to the Lord and said, 'Lord Jesus quickly come'". During this time, she had prepared some text for Paul for a composition based on the Book of Revelation. While at his son's bedside, Paul Manz began drafting the composition, which later became the current piece. Their son did recover, which the couple attributed to the power of prayer.

The motet is written for SATB, and is normally performed at an adagio pace with slight changes in tempo in certain phrases of the piece.

The text of the piece comes from a number of verses in the Book of Revelation, much of which is drawn from chapter 22. For instance, the line

And night shall be no more;

they need no light nor lamp nor sun,

for Christ will be their all.

— Manz, E'en So, Lord Jesus, Quickly Come, 1953

is taken from Revelation 22:5:

And there will be no more night; they need no light of lamp or sun, for the Lord God will be their light, and they will reign forever and ever.

Over one million copies of the composition have been sold. The composition was first published by Concordia Publishing House in 1954 and the copyright was renewed in 1982. In 1987, the copyright was transferred to publisher Birnamwood Publications, a division of MorningStar Music Publishers, Inc.

== Notable performances ==
The piece is often performed in choral settings, and has been performed publicly as early as 1974; it was featured at the Nine Lessons and Carols by King's College Choir and has been performed by many other choral groups for similar Christmas and other services. It is one of the signature songs of the Wheaton College Men's Glee Club who perform it with alumni members at the end of every concert. It has also been performed by a mandolin quartet under Windham Hill.
