= Hymn Society =

The Hymn Society may refer to:

- The Hymn Society of Great Britain and Ireland
- The Hymn Society in the United States and Canada
