= Marc (given name) =

Marc is a French, Catalan, and Romanian masculine given name of Latin origin, derived from the Roman name Marcus.

Marc may refer to:

- Marc Abaya, (born 1979), Filipino actor, singer, and musician
- Marc Acito (born 1966), American playwright, novelist, and humorist
- Marc Alaimo (born 1942), American actor
- Marc Albrighton (born 1989), English footballer
- Marc Alexandre, French judoka
- Marc Allégret (1900–1973), French screenwriter, photographer and film director
- Marc Almond, English artist and one half of Soft Cell
- Marc Andreessen, chair of Opsware
- Marc Andreu, French rugby union player
- Marc D. Angel, rabbi and author
- Marc Andreyko (born 1970), American comic book writer and screenwriter
- Marc Angelucci, American lawyer and men's rights activist
- Marc Anthony, Puerto Rican-American singer-songwriter
- Marc Asch (born 1946), American politician
- Marc Awodey (1960–2012), American contemporary artist and poetriter
- Marc Bartra, Spanish footballer
- Marc Batchelor (1970–2019), South African footballer
- Marc Bator (born 1972), German television moderator
- Marc Bell, drummer for The Ramones
- Marc Bell, Canadian absurdist cartoonist
- Marc Bélanger (musician) (born 1940), Canadian violinist
- Marc Benioff (born 1964), American internet entrepreneur billionaire and philanthropist
- Marc Bennett (1967–2019), British travel advisor
- Marc Bergevin (born 1965), Canadian former ice hockey player and former general manager of the Montreal Canadiens
- Marc Berman (born 1980), American politician and attorney
- Marc Bernicke (born 1995), German politician
- Marc Bellemare (born 1956), Canadian lawyer and politician
- Marc-André Blanchard (born 1965), Canadian executive, lawyer, and former diplomat
- Marc Blitzstein, American composer
- Marc Bloch (1886–1944), French historian
- Marc Blondin, French Canadian professional wrestling commentator
- Marc Blucas, American actor
- Marc Bolan (1947–1977), singer and songwriter for T. Rex
- Marc de Bonte, Belgian kickboxer
- Marc Breslow (1925–2015), American television director
- Marc Brown (disambiguation)
- Marc Isambard Brunel, French engineer, father of Isambard Kingdom Brunel
- Marc Bulger, American football player
- Marc-Antoine Camirand (born 1979), Canadian racing driver
- Marc Camille Chaimowicz, French-British painter
- Marc Canter, well-known figure in the sphere of open standards, social networks and blogging
- Marc Caro (born 1956), French filmmaker and cartoonist, partner of Jean-Pierre Jeunet
- Marc Carroll (born 1972), Irish musician, songwriter and multi-instrumentalist
- Marc Cécillon, French rugby union player and convicted murderer
- Marc Chagall, Belarusian painter
- Marc Cherry (born 1962), American television writer and producer
- Marc Cohn, American Grammy Award-winning singer-songwriter
- Marc Collins-Rector (born 1959), American businessman
- Marc Copani (born 1981), American professional wrestler and school principal
- Marc Copland, American jazz pianist
- Marc H. Dalton (born 1965), retired United States Navy rear admiral
- Marc Dalton, Canadian politician
- Marc Diraison (born 1975), American voice actor
- Marc Davis, multiple people
- Marc Donato (born 1989), Canadian actor
- Marc Dreier (born 1950), former American lawyer
- Marc Dupré (born 1973), Canadian singer, songwriter and musician
- Marc Dutroux (born 1956), Belgian serial killer
- Marc Ecko, American entrepreneur and fashion designer
- Marc-Antoine Eidous (c.1724 – c.1790), French writer
- Marc Ellis, an All Black rugby player
- Marc Emery, Canadian politician and marijuana advocate
- Marc Enfroy (born 1965), American composer, songwriter and producer
- Marc Fisher (born 1958), American senior editor for The Washington Post
- Marc-Vivien Foé, Cameroonian footballer
- Marc Fogel, American schoolteacher
- Marc Ford (born 1966), American blues-rock guitarist
- Marc-Antoine Fortuné (born 1981), French Guianan professional football manager and former player
- Marc Forster, German-Swiss filmmaker and screenwriter
- Marc Gagnon, Canadian athlete and Olympian
- Marc Garneau, Canadian astronaut
- Marc Gasol, Catalan basketball player
- Marc Gilpin (1966–2023), American child actor
- Marc-Amable Girard (1822–1892), second premier of Manitoba
- Marc Gonsalves (born 1972), American Northrop Grumman member
- Marc Griffin (born 1956), American judge
- Marc Guéhi (born 2000), English footballer
- Marc Guggenheim (born 1970), American screenwriter, television producer, comic book writer, and novelist
- Marc-André Hamelin, French-Canadian pianist
- Marc Hamilton (1944–2022), Canadian singer
- Marc Hannaford, Australian jazz pianist
- Marc Hempel, American cartoonist known for his work on The Sandman with Neil Gaiman
- Marc Hoffmann (born 1973), German sex offender and murderer
- Marc Hodler, International Olympic Committee member
- Marc Hogan (born 1981), American journalist
- Marc de Hond (1977–2020), Dutch television presenter, businessman, author, and theatre performer
- Marc Jacobs, American fashion designer
- Marc Jampole (born 1950), American poet, public relations executive, former television news reporter and political blogger
- Marc Janko, Austrian footballer
- Marc Kielburger, Canadian social entrepreneur, co-founder of WE Charity and ME to WE
- Marc-Uwe Kling, German author and comedian
- Marc Kudisch, American stage actor
- Marc Labrèche (born 1960), Canadian actor, comedian and host
- Marc Lacroix (biochemist) (born 1963), Belgian biochemist
- Marc Lacroix (photographer), French photographer
- Marc Lasry, American billionaire hedge fund manager
- Marc Lawrence, American actor
- Marc Leach (born 1994), English professional boxer
- Marc Lembeck (born 1989), German para-rower
- Marc Lépine (1964–1989), Canadian mass murderer and perpetrator of the 1989 École Polytechnique massacre
- Marc Malon, American politician
- Marc Maron, American stand-up comedian
- Marc Márquez, Spanish Grand Prix motorcycle racer
- Marc May, American football player
- Marc McMain, American politician
- Marc Meneau (1943–2020), French chef
- Marc Mero (born 1960), American professional wrestler
- Marc Methot (born 1985), Canadian professional ice hockey player
- Marc Miller, several people
- Marc Morley, American lacrosse player
- Marc Moro, (born 1977), Canadian former professional hockey player
- Marc Mozart, German songwriter, record producer and music manager
- Marc Munford (born 1965), American football player
- Marc Norman (born 1941), American screenwriter, novelist and playwright
- Marc Okrand, creator of the Klingon language
- Marc Overmars, Dutch footballer
- Marc Panther, French-Japanese singer and member of the Japanese pop group Globe
- Marc Picard (born 1955), Canadian politician
- Marc Pingris (born 1981), Filipino basketball player
- Marc Platt (born 1957), American producer
- Marc du Pontavice (born 1963), French producer
- Marc Price, American actor and comedian
- Marc Quessy, Canadian paralympic athlete
- Marc Quiñones (born 1963), American percussionist
- Marc Ratner, American Vice President of Regulatory Affairs with the Ultimate Fighting Championship
- Marc Ravalomanana, president of Madagascar
- Marc Ribot, composer
- Marc Riboud (1923–2016), French photographer
- Marc Rich (1934–2013), Swiss-based Spanish billionaire who fled the United States in 1983 to live in Switzerland in order to avoid prosecution
- Marc Rotenberg (born 1960), American lawyer
- Marc Rucart (1893–1964), French journalist and Radical politician
- Marc Armand Ruffer (1859–1917), Swiss-born British experimental pathologist and bacteriologist
- Marc Sappington (born 1978), American spree killer
- Marc Eugene Schiler, professor of the USC School of Architecture at the University of Southern California
- Marc Shaiman (born 1959), American composer
- Marc Singer, Canadian actor, best known for his role in the film The Beastmaster and its sequels
- Marc Sondheimer, producer at Pixar
- Marc Staal (born 1987), Canadian ice hockey player
- Marc Stevens, UFC fighter
- Marc Sumerak (born 1978), American freelance comic book writer
- Marc Summers (born 1951), American TV host
- Marc Swayze (1913–2012), American comic book artist
- Marc-André ter Stegen (born 1992), German footballer
- Marc Thiercelin, (born 1960) French professional sailor
- Marc Thompson, several people
- Marc Waldie, American volleyball player
- Marc Warren (disambiguation)
- Marc Wasserman (born 1968), American actor and lawyer
- Marc Webb (born 1974), American music video director and filmmaker
- Marc Webb (footballer) (born 1979), Australian rules football coach
- Marc Weiner, American comedian, puppeteer, and actor
- Marc Wilkinson (1929–2022), Australian-British composer and conductor
- Marc Wilmots (born 1969), Belgian footballer
- Marc Woodard, NFL player
- Marc Yu (born 1999), American musical child prodigy
- Marc Scott Zicree (born 1955), American science fiction author, television writer and screenwriter
- Marc Guiu Paz (born 2006), FC Barcelona player

== Fictional characters ==
- Marc, a character in the 2013 coming-of-age movie Puppylove
- Marc Godart, Time Crisis 5 character

== See also ==
- Mark (given name)
- Saint-Marc (disambiguation)
