= Alas! and Did My Saviour Bleed =

1707 hymn by Isaac Watts

- by Isaac Watts
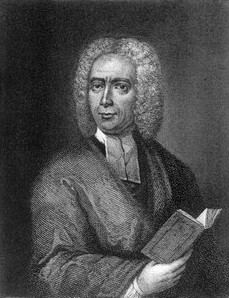
- Isaac Watts
- Genre: Hymn
- Meter: 8.6.8.6
- Melody: "Martyrdom" (Hugh Wilson), "Hudson" (Ralph E. Hudson)
- Published: 1707

"Alas! and Did My Saviour Bleed" is a hymn by Isaac Watts, first published in 1707. The words describe the crucifixion of Jesus and reflect on an appropriate personal response to this event. The hymn is commonly sung with a refrain added in 1885 by Ralph E. Hudson; when this refrain is used, the hymn is sometimes known as "At the Cross". The final line of the first stanza has attracted some criticism, as it leads the singer to call themselves a "worm". Hymnals often change the line from "for such a worm as I" to "for such a one as I" or "for sinners such as I".

== History ==
=== Original composition ===
"Alas! and Did My Saviour Bleed" was originally published in 1707, in Hymns and Spiritual Songs, which was the first collection of hymns by the prolific English hymnwriter Isaac Watts. This anthology was published in three volumes; "Alas! and Did My Saviour Bleed" was included in volume 2. This volume comprised songs "Composed on Divine Subjects", and the hymn was given the heading "Godly sorrow arising from the Sufferings of Christ".

The traditional words have commonly been paired with the hymn tune "Martyrdom", which is an adaptation of a traditional Scottish melody, attributed to Hugh Wilson. The hymn has been more popular in the US and Canada than in the UK; in North America, it is one of the most-sung hymns by Isaac Watts.

=== "At the Cross" ===
In the context of late 19th-century revivalism, this became one of a number of traditional hymns that were turned into gospel songs with the addition of a chorus. In 1885, songwriter Ralph E. Hudson added a repeated refrain in his hymnbook Songs of Peace, Love, and Joy. This refrain has been included in many hymnals:

At the cross, at the cross,
Where I first saw the light,
And the burden of my heart rolled away,
It was there by faith I received my sight,
And now I am happy all the day!

The words and music of this refrain probably originated in camp meetings of the time. When this chorus is included, the hymn is often known as "At the Cross". Hudson also wrote a new tune in a gospel style for the verses; this tune is known as Hudson. The refrain has sometimes been added to other hymns as well, or included in hymnbooks as a standalone chorus.

== Text ==
=== Original words ===
The original hymn had six four-line stanzas.

Alas! and did my Saviour bleed,
And did my sov'reign die?
Would he devote that sacred Head
For such a Worm as I?

Thy Body slain, sweet Jesus, thine,
And bath'd in its own Blood,
While all expos'd to Wrath divine
The glorious Sufferer stood?

Was it for Crimes that I had done
He groan'd upon the Tree?
Amazing Pity! Grace unknown!
And Love beyond Degree?

Well might the Sun in Darkness hide,
And shut his Glories in,
When God the mighty Maker died
For Man the Creatures Sin.

Thus might I hide my blushing Face
While his dear Cross appears,
Dissolve my Heart in Thankfulness,
And melt mine Eyes to Tears.

But Drops of Grief can ne'er repay
The Debt of Love I owe;
Here, Lord, I give my self away,
'Tis all that I can do.

=== Analysis ===
The hymn words centre on the Crucifixion of Jesus, and the opening verses offer a concise summary of the doctrine of penal substitution. This doctrine is approached from a personal and emotional perspective, leading to a reflection on the appropriate response to Jesus' death. In the Canterbury Dictionary of Hymnology, Alan Gaunt describes it as "one of Watts's most intense lyric poems," which "emphasises the emotional effect on the writer and the reader/singer". According to Leland Ryken, the hymn contains the "speaker's thought process as he comes to grips with the crucifixion and what it means for him", and invites the singer to "enact the same thought process". Comparing this hymn with another well-known Isaac Watts hymn, "When I Survey the Wondrous Cross", Carl P. Daw Jr. notes that where the latter is "objective and sweeping; this one is subjective and tightly focused".

=== Alterations ===
Hymn books commonly omit the second stanza, which is described as an optional verse in the originally published version. In Salvation Army hymn books, the line "God the mighty Maker" in stanza four is changed to "Christ the mighty maker".

As well as the refrain included by Ralph E. Hudson, other hymn books have added a chorus to the hymn. Charles Price Jones, founder of the Church of Christ (Holiness) U.S.A., added the following refrain:

I surrendered at the cross,
and my heart was cleansed from sin
By the precious blood the Savior shed for me;
I am living in His word, and it daily keeps me clean!
Hallelujah, from the pow'r of sin I'm freed.

In the 1986 Song Book of the Salvation Army, the added refrain was:

Remember me, remember me,
O Lord, remember me;
Remember, Lord, thy dying groans,
And then remember me.

A three-verse version titled "Isle of Wight" was recorded by Mark Korven for the 2015 film The Witch.

=== "For such a worm as I" ===
The final line of the first stanza ("for such a worm as I") is amended in many hymnals. Sometimes, the word "worm" is changed to "one" or more commonly, the line is altered to "sinners such as I".

The original line has been criticised by some modern commentators as an example of "worm theology", which suggests to people that "low self-worth means God is more likely to show mercy and compassion upon them". Writing for Christianity Today, Mark Galli found the line problematic for promoting the idea that "only by abasing ourselves are we able to grasp and receive God's mercy". Theologian Anthony A. Hoekema has described the lyrics as an example of a hymn that has made a "contribution to the negative self-image often found among Christians".

In response to this criticism, David W. Music has claimed that the word "worm" is both lyrically and biblically appropriate:

Here, the "worm" language sets up a contrast between the majestic "Sacred Head" of Christ and the hymn writer's (and singer's) own status as a creature that falls far short of the glory of God. The writer may have also had in mind Job 25:6 ("How much less man, that is a worm? and the son of man, which is a worm?") or Psalm 22:6 ("But I am a worm, and no man").

Theologian Marva Dawn argued that the hymn's "worm" imagery is an important way of highlighting the "incredible freedom and immense joy of forgiveness". Hymnologist Madeleine Forell Marshall suggested Watts was not intending to make a general comment on humanity, but to describe how, when faced with the death of Jesus, we are "initially filled with powerful disgust and graphic self-loathing".
