= David W. Music =

American composer, writer and professor of church music (born 1949)

David Wayne Music (born January 28, 1949) is an American composer, writer and former professor of church music. He served on the faculties of both his alma maters, California Baptist College and the Southwestern Baptist Theological Seminary, before spending 18 years at Baylor University. His publications have included edited collections of primary sources, monographs on the history of American hymnody, and works on the hymnwriter Isaac Watts. He has also composed works for choirs, recorder, organ and piano. In 2010, he was named a Fellow of the Hymn Society in the United States and Canada.

== Early life and education ==
David Wayne Music was born in Ardmore, Oklahoma, on January 28, 1949. His father, Joseph Hopwood Musick, was a pastor with degrees from Baylor University and the Southwestern Baptist Theological Seminary (SWBTS). His mother, Menita Corine Cullins Music, was a school teacher, who had also studied at SWBTS, where she and Joseph met.

David Music grew up sharing his parents' Christian faith, and he sang in the youth choir of the church his father pastored in Huntington Park, California. His interest in pursuing a vocation in church music was stimulated during a conference he attended as a teenager, where he was inspired by the worship leader, Gene Bartlett.

He completed a BA in music at California Baptist College in 1970. His undergraduate studies encouraged his interest in hymnody and historical church music. He then did postgraduate study at Southwestern Baptist Theological Seminary (SWBTS), graduating with a Doctor of Musical Arts degree in 1977.

== Career ==
After leaving the Southwestern Baptist Theological Seminary, Music initially worked for three years as a minister of music, at Highland Heights Baptist Church in Memphis, Tennessee. While at Highland Heights, he won the 1980 Norman W. Cox Award from the Baptist History and Heritage Society, for his article "The Introduction of Musical Instruments into Baptist Churches in America."

In 1980, he began working at his alma mater California Baptist College, where he directed a number of choirs. In 1990, he returned to SWBTS to teach. While at SWBTS, he led the annual Sacred Harp sing (a form of unaccompanied shape note singing). From 2002 until his retirement in 2020, Music was Professor of Church Music at Baylor University in Waco, Texas, where he served as graduate program director in the School of Music from 2003 to 2012. At Baylor, he also ran Sacred Harp singing events.

Music's name has been considered a good example of nominative determinism, where a person's name correlates with their chosen career. In a 2003 news article, while teaching at Baylor University, he commented: "Most people can't believe it. I get letters addressed to 'Dr. David W., Music Department'."

== Publications ==
Music has edited two collections of primary sources relating to congregational hymn singing. The first, Hymnology: A Collection of Source Readings, was published by The Scarecrow Press in 1996. This includes excerpts from various writings, such as hymnbook prefaces, letters, diaries and theological works, from the second century to the 1960s. Charles Webb, in Church History described this as a "valuable resource" for "both the serious hymnological scholar and the interested 'person in the pew'".

This was followed by Instruments in Church: A Collection of Source Documents, published in 1998. This includes sources discussing the use of instruments in congregational worship, from the Old Testament to the 20th century. Lutheran composer and lecturer Carl Schalk described this as an "excellent work" containing "a helpful, useful, and stimulating collection of source documents."

Music has co-written a few books on American hymnody. This includes "I Will Sing the Wondrous Story": A History of Baptist Hymnody in North America, written with Paul A. Richardson and published by Mercer University Press in 2008. This book details the history of congregational singing in Baptist churches, from the earliest American Baptist groups to the present day. It includes discussions of hymnwriters, hymnbooks, music styles, and doctrine. Reviewing the book for The Hymn, Beverly Howard described this as a "definitive work on the history of Baptist hymnody", which is a "'must-have' for collections in college, university, and seminary libraries."

Music has written two books discussing the hymns of Isaac Watts: Repeat the Sounding Joy (2020) comprises reflections on 25 hymns and psalms, and Studies in the Hymnody of Isaac Watts (2022) offers a general overview of the theology, composition and usage of his hymns.

Music has contributed to a variety of journals, and was editor of The Hymn for six years. He has also written articles for The New Grove Dictionary of Music and The New Grove Dictionary of American Music. He served on the committees for two hymnals: The Baptist Hymnal (1991) and Celebrating Grace (2010). Music's compositions include choral anthems, organ-piano duets, recorder music, and hymn tunes.

== Awards and honours ==
In 2010, Music was named a Fellow of the Hymn Society in the United States and Canada, for his "outstanding contributions to the study and practice of congregational song." He was also named an Outstanding Professor for Research by Baylor University. In 2018, he was awarded a Lifetime Achievement Award from the Baptist Church Music Conference.

In 2021, a festschrift was published in his honour, featuring contributions from church music scholars such as Carl P. Daw Jr., Monique Ingalls, Richardson, and Paul Westermeyer.

== Personal life ==
Music married Doris (née Fugate) in 1971; the couple had met while they were both students at California Baptist College. They have three children.

== Bibliography ==
=== As author ===
- Music, David W. (2001). Christian Hymnody in Twentieth-Century Britain and America: An Annotated Bibliography. ABC-CLIO. ISBN 9780313075292.
- Music, David W. (2013). William J. Reynolds: Church Musician. Smith & Helwys. ISBN 9781573126908.
- Music, David W. (2020). Repeat the Sounding Joy: Reflections on Hymns by Isaac Watts. Mercer University Press. ISBN 9780881467697.
- Music, David W. (2022). Studies in the Hymnody of Isaac Watts. Brill. ISBN 9789004520523.

=== As co-author ===
- Music, David W.; Eskew, Harry; Richardson, Paul A. (1994). Singing Baptists: Studies in Baptist Hymnody in America. Church Street Press. ISBN 9780805498240.
- Music, David W.; Richardson, Paul A. (2008). "I Will Sing the Wondrous Story": A History of Baptist Hymnody in North America. Mercer University Press. ISBN 9780865549487.
- Music, David W.; Price, Milburn (2010). A Survey of Christian Hymnody, 5th edition. Hope Publishing.
- Music, David W.; Westermeyer, Paul (2014). Church Music in the United States 1760–1901. MorningStar Music Publishers.
- Music, David W.; Gray, Scotty (2021). A Noble Theme, A Skillful Writer: Timothy Dudley-Smith and Christian Hymnody. Hope Publishing.

=== As editor ===
- Music, David W., ed. (1996). Hymnology: A Collection of Source Readings. Scarecrow Press. ISBN 9780810831483.
- Music, David W., ed. (1998). Instruments in Church: A Collection of Source Documents. Scarecrow Press. ISBN 9780810835955.
- Music, David W., ed. (2005). A Selection of Shape-note Folk Hymns From Southern United States Tune Books, 1816–61. A-R Editions.
