= Mark Miller =

Mark Miller may refer to:

== Entertainment ==
- Mark D. Miller (1891–1970), Colorado photographer
- Mark Miller (actor) (1924–2022), television actor and producer, father of Penelope Ann Miller
- Mark Thomas Miller (born 1960), actor in the short-lived Misfits of Science TV series
- Mark Miller, lead singer of the band Sawyer Brown
- Mark Alan Miller, vice president of Seraphim, comic book writer
- Mark Ian Miller, actor in Speed Demon (2003 film)
- Mark Miller (composer), composer of Christian anthems, hymns, and choruses

== Sports ==
- Mark Miller (quarterback, born 1956), American football quarterback
- Mark Miller (quarterback, born 1962), American football quarterback
- Mark Miller (footballer) (born 1962), retired English football player and coach
- Mark Miller (racer) (born 1962), off-road racer, competing in both cars and on motorcycles
- Mark Miller (soccer) (born 1962), minor league U.S. soccer player
- Mark Miller (kickboxer) (born 1971), American kickboxer
- Mark Miller (basketball) (born 1975), American basketball player and coach
- Mark Miller (fighter) (born 1978), professional mixed martial artist
- Mark Miller (TT motorcyclist), American motorcycle racer

== Others ==
- Mark F. Miller (born 1943), Wisconsin state senator
- Mark Miller (Ohio), lawyer and librarian from Ohio, ran for Congress, 1992
- Mark Crispin Miller (born 1949), conspiracy theorist and professor of media studies at New York University
- Mark S. Miller, computer scientist, inventor of Miller Columns and the E programming language
- Mark Miller (Manitoba politician), councillor elected in the 1989 Winnipeg municipal election

== See also ==
- Mark Millar (born 1969), Scottish comic book writer
- Mark Millar (footballer) (born 1988), Scottish footballer
- Marc Miller (disambiguation)
