= The Hymnal 1982 =

1982 hymnal of the Episcopal Church

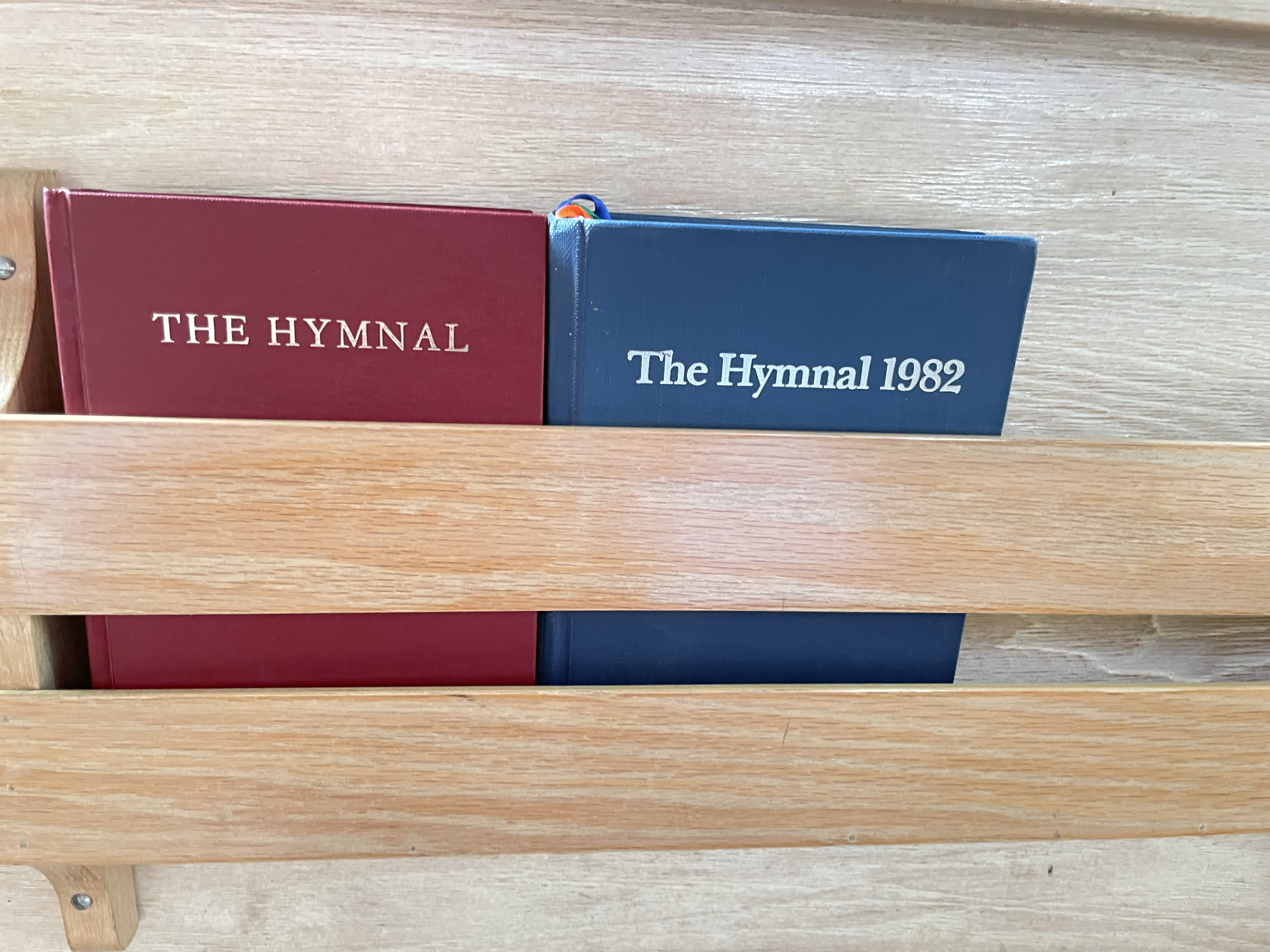
The Hymnal 1940 (left) and The Hymnal 1982 in a pew

The Hymnal 1982 is the primary hymnal of the Episcopal Church in the United States of America. It is one in a series of seven official hymnals of the Episcopal Church, including The Hymnal 1940. Unlike many Anglican churches (including the Church of England) the Episcopal Church requires that the words of hymns be from officially approved sources, making the official hymnals perhaps more important than their counterparts elsewhere. The Hymnal 1940 was originally compiled with input from the Joint Commission on Church Music of the Episcopal Church, which was founded in 1919. The Hymnal 1982 was put together based on the Joint Commission's work by the Standing Commission on Church Music. The Hymnal 1982 had a much expanded service music and chant section, which became necessary with the introduction of the 1979 edition of the Book of Common Prayer. The Hymnal 1982 was approved by both houses of General Convention, the governing body of the Episcopal Church, in 1982. It is published by The Church Pension Fund.

In addition to the service music, The Hymnal 1982 has 720 hymns. It is strongly founded on congregational singing, and takes some beginning steps toward multiculturalism, including eight hymns based on spirituals, two on Ghanaian work songs, two on Chinese hymns, two on "Amerindian" songs, one Hispanic American song, and one by a Mexican composer.

== Use in other countries ==
Because the Episcopal Church in the Philippines (ECP) was a former missionary district of the Episcopal Church of the United States of America, the former still retains a lot of the character of the latter. The ECP was granted Full Provincehood on 1 May 1990, and is still undergoing processes to develop its own identity apart from TEC. The ECP continues to use The Hymnal 1982 and The Hymnal 1940 along with the ECP Trial Hymnal.

== See also ==
- Carl P. Daw Jr. - Executive Director of the Hymn Society in the United States and Canada.
- Venantius Fortunatus
- Randall Giles
- List of English-language hymnals by denomination

== Sources ==
- Nicholas Temperley. "Anglican and Episcopalian church music", Grove Music Online, ed. L. Macy (accessed December 17, 2006), grovemusic.com (subscription access).
- The Hymnal 1982 ISBN 0-89869-120-6
