= Hymn Society in the United States and Canada =

The Hymn Society in the United States and Canada
- Predecessor: The Hymn Society of America
- Formation: 1922; 104 years ago
- Tax ID no.: 13-5564941
- Purpose: To encourage, promote, and enliven congregational singing
- Headquarters: Washington, DC
- Executive Director: J. Michael McMahon, DMin
- President of the Board: Hilary Seraph Donaldson, PhD
- President-Elect: Charles D. Frost
- Immediate Past President: Benjamin Brody, DMA
- Revenue: $652,831 (2016)
- Expenses: $384,659 (2016)
- Website: thehymnsociety.org

The Hymn Society in the United States and Canada – founded in 1922 as The Hymn Society of America and renamed in 1991 – is a not-for-profit organization based in North America. It is for those people who believe that congregational song is an integral component of worship, believe that the writing and singing of new texts and tunes needs to be promoted, and value learning about the origins of the words and music they sing.

Members of The Hymn Society include clergy and worship leaders, church musicians, poets, composers, scholars, libraries and congregational singers of varied backgrounds and interests. Members of all denominations, races and cultures participate in the annual conferences and workshops sponsored by The Hymn Society. The Society produces a quarterly publication, The Hymn, a journal of research and opinion, containing practical and scholarly articles and reflecting the diverse cultural and theological identities of the organization's membership. In 1984 it published, on microfilm, the Dictionary of American Hymnody (edited by Leonard Ellinwood and Elizabeth Lockwood), an index to the texts of more than 8000 North American hymnals.

== Center for Congregational Song ==
The Center for Congregational Song (CCS) is the resource and programmatic arm of The Hymn Society in the United States and Canada. Run by The Hymn Society and funded by Society members and donors, it works to fulfill The Hymn Society's mission to "encourage, promote, and enliven congregational singing". The current Director of the CCS is Brian Hehn.

== Fellowship ==
Since 1942, the Hymn Society has awarded a fellowship for hymnwriters, composers, hymnal editors and hymnologists. It is the society's highest individual honor. Fellowship recipients include:

- 1942: William Walker Rockwell
- 1944: Harry Burleigh
- 1946: Clarence Dickinson and Helen Adell Dickinson
- 1952: Henry Wilder Foote, Harry Emerson Fosdick, J. Vincent Higginson, John Haynes Holmes and William P. Merrill
- 1956: Luther D. Reed
- 1957: Ruth Messenger
- 1962: Walter Edwin Buszin, Leonard Ellinwood, Armin Haeussler, Earl E. Harper and Thomas Tiplady
- 1966: Deane Edwards
- 1967: William Watkins Reid
- 1968: Phillip Sidney Watters
- 1970: David Hugh Jones
- 1972: Lee Hastings Bristol Jr., Shirley Lewis Brown, George Litch Knight and Jean Woodward Steele
- 1975: Jan O. Bender and Ralph Mortensen
- 1980: Francis Bland Tucker
- 1982: Fred Pratt Green and Frank Von Christierson
- 1983: James Rawlings Sydnor and Anastasia van Burkalow
- 1985: Erik Routley (posthumously), John Whitridge Wilson
- 1986: Austin Cole Lovelace and Stanley Llewellen Osborne
- 1988: Jaroslav Vajda
- 1989: Donald Hustad and Mary K. Oyer
- 1990: George Herbert Shorney
- 1991: Hugh Thomas McElrath
- 1992: William Jensen Reynolds and Carl Schalk
- 1993: Margaret Clarkson and Carlton R. Young
- 1995: Ellen Jane Lorenz and I-to Loh
- 1996: Mary Louise VanDyke, W. Thomas Smith and Sylvia G. Dunstan (posthumously)
- 1997: L. David Miller and Timothy Dudley-Smith
- 2000: Alice Parker
- 2001: Frederik Herman Kaan and Brian Wren
- 2002: Harry L. Eskew
- 2004: Emily R. Brink, Herman Gustav Steumpfle Jr. and Paul H. Westermeyer
- 2006: Robert J. Batastini
- 2007: Carl P. Daw Jr. and John L. Bell
- 2008: C. Michael Hawn
- 2009: Shirley Murray
- 2010: David W. Music, Paul A. Richardson and Paul R. Powell
- 2013: Ruth C. Duck and Delores Dufner
- 2014: Fred Kimball Graham and Nicholas Temperley
- 2015: W. James Abbington Jr.
- 2016: Daniel Charles Damon, Deborah Carlton Loftis and John Thornburg
- 2017: John Ambrose, Melva W. Costen, João Faustini and John Richard "Dick" Watson
- 2018: S T Kimbrough Jr., Patrick Matsikenyiri and Pablo Sosa
- 2019: Ken Nafziger and Thomas H. Troeger
- 2020: Mary Louise Bringle, Nancy Rosenberger Faus-Mullen and Gracia Marie Grindal
- 2021: Andrew Donaldson, Robin Knowles Wallace and Sally Ann Morris
- 2022: Ysaye M. Barnwell, Jacque Browning Jones, Per Harling, Lim Swee Hong, Randall Sensmeier and Cynthia A. Wilson
- 2023: David E. Eicher and Simei Monteiro
- 2024: Marty Haugen, Jan Kraybill, Mark Miller and Adam M. L. Tice
- 2025: Michael Joncas, Raquel Mora Martínez, Mary Frances Reza and Tina Schneider
- 2026: Beverly Howard, Mary Nelson Keithahn, J. Michael McMahon, Martin Tel, Karen B. Westerfield Tucker

== See also ==
- Hymn Society of Great Britain and Ireland
