= Randall Giles =

Randall Giles (1950 – August 27, 2010) was an American music composer, Episcopal Church missionary, and ethnographer.

He was born in Oregon City, Oregon in 1950. His first studies in composition were with Mark DeVoto at Reed College, after which he took his undergraduate degree at the University of York while studying with Sir Peter Maxwell Davies in London. He was a United States Peace Corps volunteer in Liberia, and also earned a master's degree at Northwestern University.

He was known for both his music used in the Episcopal Church, and as an ethnographer and missionary in India.

Giles wrote several settings for religious services in the Episcopal Church, including Service Music for St. Mary's, and Trisagion. He also wrote three hymns for Wonder, Love and Praise, the 2001 supplement to the bestselling The Hymnal 1982 -- Monrovia, which is a new musical setting for Faithful Cross by Venantius Honorius Fortunatus, Dorland Mountain, and Dillow.

He lived most recently in Chennai, where he was diocesan director of music, and died in Pondicherry of a heart attack at the age of 60.
