= Worm theology =

Worm theology is Christian theological position emphasizing the depravity of humanity in comparison to God's power. The name is often attributed to a line in the Isaac Watts hymn Alas! and Did My Saviour Bleed (Pub 1707) which says "Would he devote that sacred head for such a worm as I?"

== Origins ==
Worm theology has similarities to the teachings of John Calvin (1509–1564) a 16th-century theologian and Protestant reformer. Calvin saw the human race as totally unable to do anything to free itself from sin.
