= Anastasia van Burkalow =

American geographer, hymnologist

- Born: March 16, 1911; Buchanan, New York
- Died: January 14, 2004 (aged 92); Wantage, New Jersey
- Education: Hunter College; Columbia University
- Occupations: Geographer and hymnologist

Anastasia van Burkalow (March 16, 1911 – January 14, 2004) was an American professor of geology and geography, and a hymnologist and hymn poet.

== Life and work ==
Van Burkalow was born in Buchanan, New York into a ministerial family. Her father and both grandfathers were Methodist ministers, and her mother had a music education. When Van Burkalow started her studies, she set out to become a teacher.

She graduated with a B.A. degree in geology from Hunter College in 1931 and then enrolled in the master's program at Columbia University. She finished her master's degree in 1933 and was immediately recommended to continue with a doctorate, which she finished in 1944, becoming the first woman to receive the prestigious title of Kemp Fellowship in Geology at Columbia. She began teaching at Hunter in 1941 and remained there until she retired as a Professor Emerita.

=== Geographer ===
Van Burkalow wrote a number of articles and was editor of the Journal of Geological Education from 1954 to 1956. In 1948 she was nominated for membership in the American Geographical Society and in 1951 she was admitted to the Society of Woman Geographers—New York Group. In 1961 she was named Head of the Geology and the Geography Department at Hunter for four consecutive four-year terms, and in 1973 was inducted into the Hunter College Alumni Hall of Fame.

Her research ranged across many geographical specialties including geomorphology, physical geography, cartography, conservation, resources, and medical geology and geography. For the 1952 annual meeting in the United States of the International Geographical Union, Van Burkalow presented her creation of "one of the first analytical works on the New York City water supply system" as well as an extensive Transcontinental Excursion Field Guide.

After retiring, she continued her research and publishing. In 1983 she became a Fellow of the American Geographical Society and received their Distinguished Service Award in 1998. In 1990 Hunter College established its Anastasia Van Burkalow Distinguished Service Award to honor her, and in 1996 they awarded her an honorary Doctor of Science.

At the time of her death, she was the longest active member of the Society of Woman Geographers–New York Group. She died in Wantage, New Jersey on January 14, 2004.

=== Hymnologist ===
Privately, Van Burkalow remained very interested in church music throughout her life. She played the organ at several New York City churches and was a member of the Hymn Society of America for more than sixty years. There, too, she received the title of Fellow. She wrote many hymns, and one of these can be found in Norway in Norsk Salmebok and Norsk salmebok 2013.

== Selected publications ==
- Van Burkalow, A. (1945). Angle of repose and angle of sliding friction: an experimental study. Geological Society of America Bulletin, 56(6), 669-707.
- Van Burkalow, A. (1946). Fluorine in United States Water Supplies: Pilot Project for the Atlas of Diseases. Geographical Review, 36(2), 177-193.
- Jarcho, S., & Van Burkalow, A. (1952). A geographical study of "swimmers' itch" in the United States and Canada. Geographical Review, 42(2), 212-226.
- Van Burkalow, A. (1959). The geography of New York City's water supply: a study of interactions. Geographical Review, 49(3), 369-386.
- Burkalow, A. V. (1960). What Shall We Teach About the Earth's Shape?. Journal of Geography, 59(5), 229-234.
