= Ralph E. Hudson =

American hymnwriter (1843–1901)

Ralph Erskine Hudson (July 9, 1843 – June 14, 1901) was an American composer and hymnwriter. He is best remembered for his hymn "My Life, My Love, I Give to Thee" and his addition of a refrain and composition of a new tune for the Isaac Watts hymn "Alas! and Did My Saviour Bleed".

== Early life and military service ==
Ralph Erskine Hudson was born on July 9, 1843, in Napoleon, Ohio. In his childhood, his family moved to Philadelphia. At the outbreak of the American Civil War, Hudson enlisted in the Union Army, joining Company K of the 10th Pennsylvania Reserve Regiment on June 20, 1861. Between June 1862 and February 1863, Hudson served as a nurse at the General Hospital in Annapolis, Maryland. While working at the hospital, he met Mary Smith, from Annapolis; the couple married on March 4, 1863. Hudson was honorably discharged on June 11, 1864.

== Music career ==
An accomplished musician, after his discharge Hudson began teaching music at a college in Alliance, Ohio, where he remained for five years. While in Alliance, Hudson started a music publishing business. At the same time, he was a lay preacher in the Methodist Episcopal Church. He had a particular concern for evangelism, both in preaching and as an evangelistic singer.

Hudson's first hymn book, Salvation Echoes, was published in 1882. He later published a further four songbooks: Gems of Gospel Songs (1884), Songs of Peace, Love and Joy (1885), The Temperance Songster (1886) and Songs of the Ransomed (1887). Hudson was a prohibitionist, who advocated for total abstinence from alcohol, and wrote many songs about temperance. The Temperance Songster comprises songs addressing this topic.

== Notable works ==
Some of Hudson's hymns and choruses continue to appear in modern hymnals. Generally, his work has been better-known in America and Canada than in the United Kingdom.

Hudson's best-known original hymn is "My Life, My Love, I Give to Thee," which was published in his collected Salvation Echoes (1882). This hymn was included in hundreds of 19th- and 20th-century hymnals, and is still included in the Baptist Hymnal, the primary hymnbook of the Southern Baptist Convention. It is generally sung to the tube "Dunbar", written by C.R. Dunbar.

Hudson also added refrains to some traditional hymns, including "Alas! and Did My Saviour Bleed" and "O for a Thousand Tongues to Sing." His adaptation of "O for a Thousand Tongues to Sing" includes the repeated line "Blessed be the name of the Lord." It was first published in Songs for the Ransomed (1887). It had particular popularity in Southern Baptist Convention churches, and is included in the Baptist Hymnal.

He composed music for the Clara Tear Williams hymns "Satisfied", which was first published in 1881. Describing the composition of this hymn, Williams wrote:

About 1875, I was helping in meetings in Troy, Ohio, where Professor R. E. Hudson conducted the singing, when, just before retiring one night, he asked me to write a song for a book he was preparing to publish. Before sleeping, I wrote "Satisfied." In the morning, he composed the music.

== Death ==
Hudson died on June 14, 1901, in Cleveland, Ohio. He is buried in Alliance City Cemetery. His wife Mary died in 1925, and is buried with him in Alliance City Cemetery.
