= Nancy Raabe =

American pastor

Nancy M. Raabe
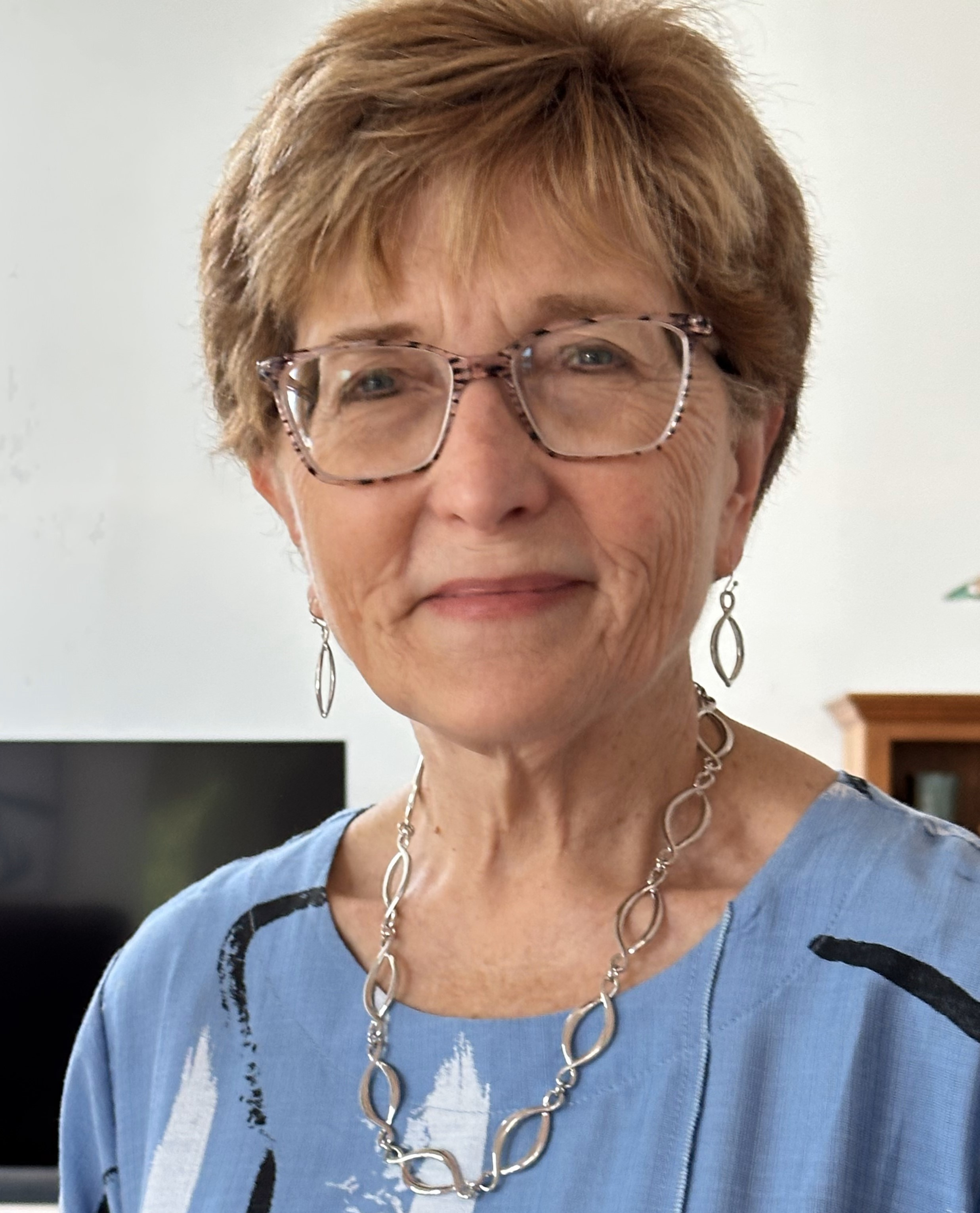
- Nancy M Raabe, Philadelphia 2025
- Born: Nancy Elizabeth Miller; 1954 (age 71–72); Pomona, California
- Education: Pomona College; Trinity Lutheran Seminary; Wartburg Theological Seminary
- Occupations: Lutheran pastor Author; Composer
- Years active: 1990–
- Notable work: Carl Schalk: A Life in Song
- Spouse: William A. Raabe (m. 1989)

Nancy Elizabeth Miller Raabe (born 1954) is a retired American clergy member, author, and composer. She served congregations in Ohio, Wisconsin, and Pennsylvania, and was the pastor of Grace Lutheran Church in Hatfield, Pennsylvania.

== Early life and education ==
Raabe was born in 1954. She graduated from Pomona College, Phi Beta Kappa in music, in 1977. She completed two master's degrees in theology from Trinity Lutheran Seminary in Columbus, Ohio, and doctoral coursework in musicology at Brandeis University, focusing on the works of Gustav Mahler. Raabe completed her preparation for ordination into the ministry at Wartburg Theological Seminary in Dubuque, Iowa.

== Career ==
=== Lutheran pastorship ===
Raabe served as a deacon at Luther Memorial Church in Madison, Wisconsin from 2014 to 2016. From 2016 to 2018, she was pastor at Atonement Lutheran Church in Beloit, Wisconsin. In January 2018, she was ordained as a Lutheran pastor and became the pastor of Holy Trinity Lutheran Church in Marshall, Wisconsin. From 2021 to 2025, she was the pastor of Grace Lutheran Church in Hatfield, Pennsylvania. She is a chaplain for the members of the Association of Lutheran Church Musicians.

=== Musical compositions ===
Raabe's compositions are included in the St Olaf Choirbook for Women (2017) and the St Olaf Choirbook for Men (2015).

Every year, Raabe writes and shares an original tune for an ancient Christmas carol, including Carol of the Birds and The Clanging of Joybells.

Raabe's setting of Savior of the Nations, Come was featured at the 2019 Christmas Eve concert of the Duke University Chapel Choir, telecast on CBS. Her original arrangement of the Langston Hughes poem I Dream A World was a finalist for first prize at the 2010 Ithaca College Choral Composition Festival.

Raabe and her husband have commissioned about 80 hymn settings, concertatos, anthems, organ suites, and other music for the Christian church since 1990.

They also established the Raabe Prize For Excellence In Sacred Composition, which is awarded by the Association of Lutheran Church Musicians biennially. The Raabe Prize also supports other activities aiding composers and worship leaders.

From 2022 to 2025, Raabe was the president of the Association of Lutheran Church Musicians. She is a member of the advisory board for the Center for Church Music at Concordia University Chicago.

=== Writings and academic work ===
Raabe's academic interests include "hymnody, psalms, Gustav Mahler, and a theology of the arts." Her books include three volumes of One-Minute Devotions for the Church Musician and a critical biography of the Lutheran composer Carl F. Schalk. Her books are published by Concordia, MorningStar, and Lutheran University Press.

Raabe's devotional writings have been published in Bread for the Day, Prelude Music Planner, Christ in Our Home, and The Word in Season. She has written for the Faith Matters column of The Lansdale Reporter, and her monthly column Faith and Culture appeared in the Beloit Daily News. Her columns Prairie View and Both Sides Now have been published in In Tempo, a resource of the Association of Lutheran Church Musicians.

Prior to entering the ministry, Raabe was the classical music critic for the Milwaukee Sentinel and Birmingham News. Her articles on music also appeared in The New York Times, Performance Practice Review, Keynote, Playbill, and The Diapason.

Nancy Raabe is a 2022 Engle Preaching Fellow at Princeton Theological Seminary.

== Personal life ==
Raabe met and married William Alan Raabe in Milwaukee in 1989. He is an author and retired professor.

Raabe was a member of the Board of Directors of the Space One Eleven Arts Center in Birmingham, and of the Milton (WI) Community Foundation.
