= Luther Memorial Church =

Coordinates: 43.07298°N 89.40345°W

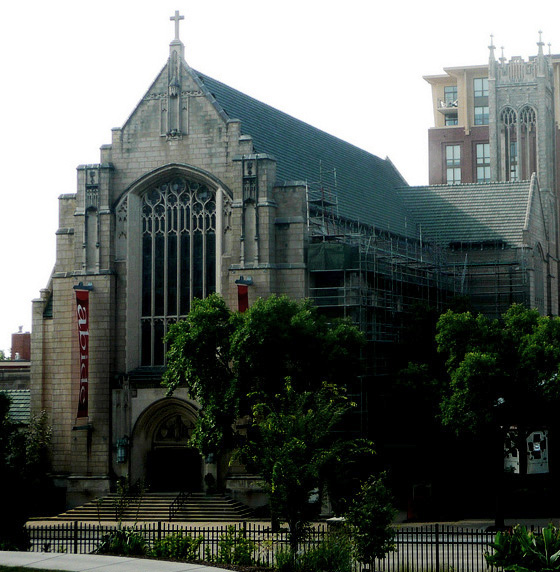
- Luther Memorial Church
- Location: Madison, Wisconsin
- Country: United States
- Denomination: Evangelical Lutheran Church in America (ELCA)
- Website: www.luthermem.org

History
- Status: Church
- Founded: 1907

Architecture
- Functional status: Active

Luther Memorial Church is a Lutheran congregation at 1021 University Avenue in Madison, Wisconsin in the United States. A member of the Evangelical Lutheran Church in America (ELCA), it is known for its worship, music, education, social ministry and preschool programs. The congregation's cathedral-like Neogothic-style building, designed by local architects Claude & Starck and built in 1923, was added to the National Register of Historic Places in 2018.

== History ==
Luther Memorial Church originated in a ministry to University of Wisconsin students in 1905, and was the first Lutheran church in Madison to offer all services in English. In 1907, some of those involved chartered Holy Trinity Lutheran Church. The congregation initially rented space in Gates of Heaven Synagogue for weekly worship. That early congregation was largely UW students and staff, but included others. That same year (1907) the congregation also started the Lutheran Campus Center.

In 1915 the congregation had a chapel which could seat 300 built at 626 University Avenue, designed by the Madison architect firm of Louis Claude & Edward Starck. (This building is now the Churchkey Bar & Grill.) They intended it to eventually be a Sunday school building for the large church they planned to build next door. The congregation moved worship to the building. They were the first Lutheran congregation in Madison to hold only English services. In 1918 they changed the congregation's name to Luther Memorial Evangelical Lutheran Church.

In 1920 the congregation commissioned Claude & Starck to design a larger church building modeled on European cathedrals. The architects designed a Neogothic-style building with a vertical emphasis, pointing toward heaven like old Gothic Revival style, but with a newer flavor in the low arch-tops above windows and doors. The front of the building facing University Avenue is 100 feet tall and symmetric, with rectangular columns and buttresses flanking the main entrance. Above the entrance is a large stained glass window set in stone frames. Above that, a stone cross tops the peak of the gable. The walls are coursed buff-colored limestone from Colfax, trimmed with Bedford limestone. A transept wing extends from the back of the main nave on each side. A square chimes tower rises behind the southwest transept wing, with large openings letting the sky peek through the tower and more Gothic decoration and four finials above that. Inside, the nave is 150 feet long, designed to seat 1650 people. The stained glass was designed by the Gaytee Stained Glass Company of Minneapolis. The stencil patterns on the walls may have been designed by Gaytee too. The curved trusses supporting the roof are steel, covered with plaster and then painted to look like wood. They support a stained wood ceiling. The pulpit, lectern and original baptismal font were carved from limestone. The altar and reredos were carved from the same by Walter Sutton of Bayview Stone Company of Madison.

Construction began in May 1921, with Wisconsin Construction Company as general contractor. The new church was dedicated October 28, 1923. The education building was added in 1957-59, designed by Madison architect Reginald Stehr. Over the years the congregation has shared its space with various musical groups from the UW. The main building was designated as a Madison Landmark in 2011, and was listed on the National Register of Historic Places in 2018.

== Worship ==
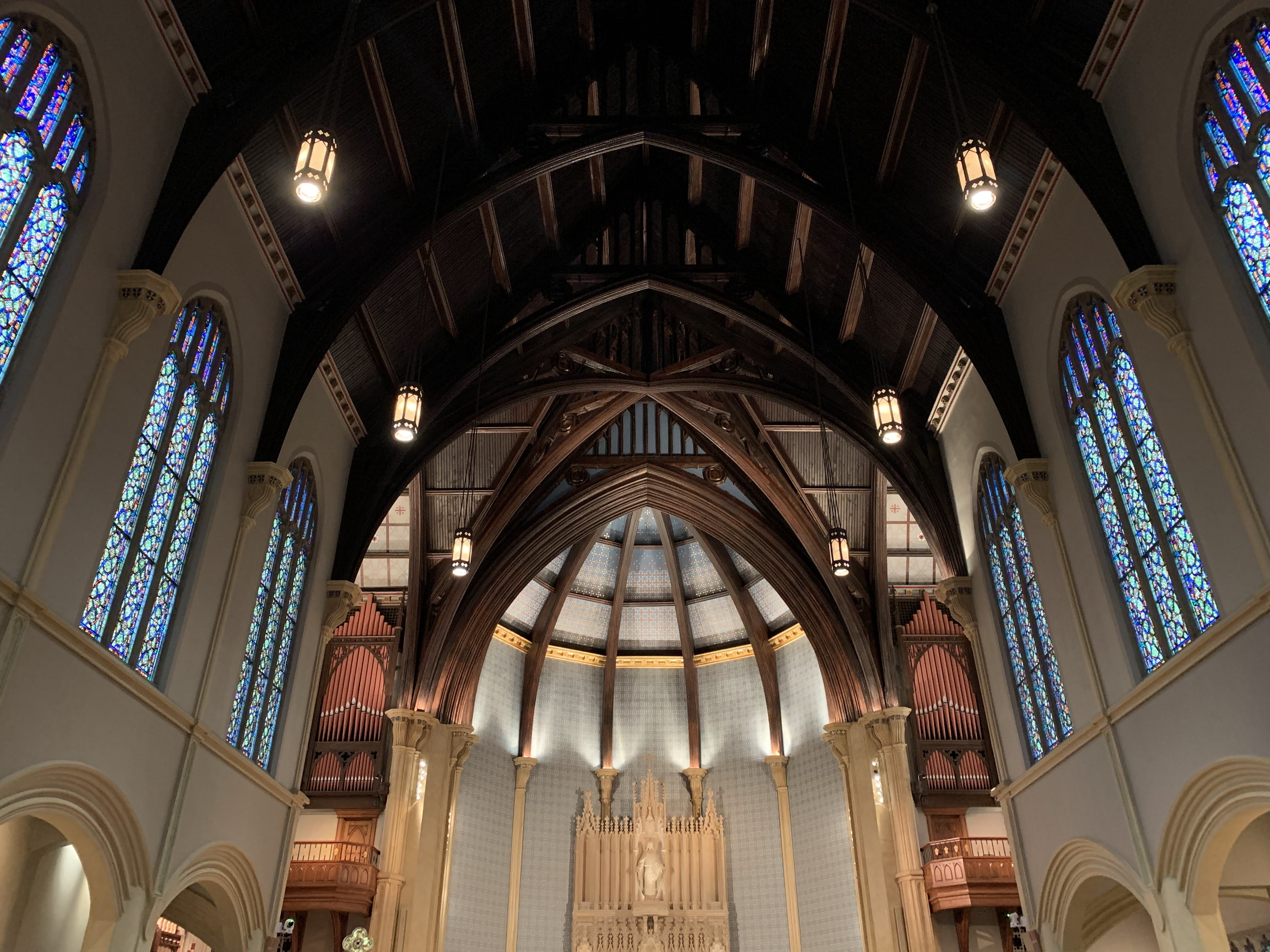
Upper interior

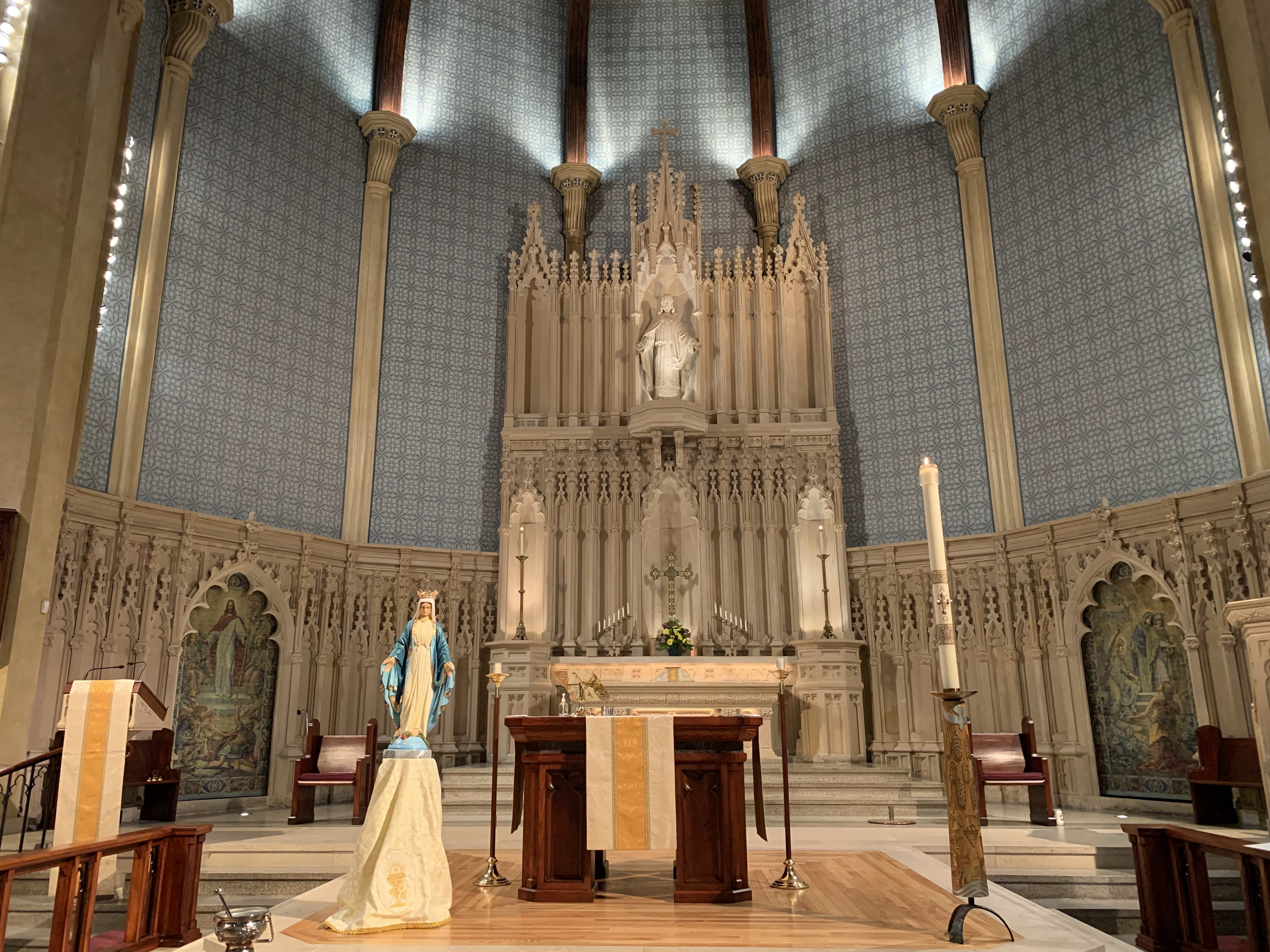
Sanctuary and altar

Luther Memorial's worship has a traditional liturgy with Holy Communion every Sunday and on other holy days. A service of morning prayer is also held each weekday morning online. Services also feature hymns and classical music.

== Music ==
Luther Memorial's music program is led by Andrew Schaeffer, who has served as the director of music since 2018. Three pipe organs are used in worship: a 56 rank Austin pipe organ, a Steere tracker organ, and a Bedient portative organ. The church hosts the winter choral concerts presented by UW-Madison's choirs each December. Luther Memorial has twice been a venue for concerts by the St. Thomas Choir of Leipzig, a boys' choir founded in 1212. Luther College and St. Olaf College choirs also regularly perform in the church's nave.

Performing regularly throughout the church year are the following ensembles:

Adult choir (50 members of all ages) performing Sunday mornings sacred music ranging from plainsong chant to contemporary compositions in English, Latin, and occasionally German or Russian (Church Slavonic).
Chant choir performing the monthly compline service, singing in English and Latin.
Training choir, ages K-2
Children's choir, ages 3–6
Youth choir, ages 7–12
Recorder ensemble open to all ages
Bell choir playing 5-octave and 2-octave sets of Malmark bells.

== Social ministry ==
The following programs are examples of the church's commitment to ministering to those in need:

The congregation began participating in the Interfaith Hospitality Network (IHN) in 1999 as a host congregation. IHN, now called The Road Home, is a Madison-based organization that provides housing for homeless people in churches on a rotating basis. Luther Memorial continued as host congregation until early 2018, when The Road Home ended that program.

Luther Memorial was the first Adopt-a-House church partner with Habitat for Humanity of Dane County, Wisconsin, raising money and providing volunteers in 1993 to build a house for a family in need.

== Campus ministry ==
The congregation embraces its location amid the Madison campus of the University of Wisconsin, by involving students in all parts of the church life. Luther Memorial is also one of three covenant congregations in partnership with the Lutheran Campus Center (LCC) next door at 325 N. Mills Street. The LCC conducts worship at the church and its pastor often preaches at Luther Memorial.

== Preschool ==
The church operated a Christian-based preschool on site beginning in 1997. The preschool closed in 2015 after the city school district began offering free kindergarten to four-year-old children.

== Pastors and program staff, past and present ==
This list is not complete. Some lay staff members served for more years than are indicated below. Others served the church in clerical, building maintenance and other capacities.

Pre-organization ministers

- The Rev. W. K. Frick, Milwaukee held introductory meeting, 1905
- Olga Nelson Berg, Organist, 1905
- Paul Hoerlein Roth, G. H. Gerberding, C. K. Lippard, C. A. Naumann, A. C. Peterson, and Paul Wagner Roth, Chicago Lutheran Theological Seminary instructors and students, conducted services, winter 1905-1906.
- Conrad Hoffman, Sunday school superintendent, 1906–1913
- The Rev. A. C. Petersen, 1906
- The Rev. A. C. Anda, missionary, 1907–1916

1. The Rev. Howard R. Gold, pastor, 1907–1916

- Grover Rapps, organist
- Rev. John F. Fedders, associate pastor in charge of educational and student work, 1911–1912
- Mrs. Stevenson, choir director, 1912
- Clarence Rowley, Sunday school superintendent, 1913–1916
- Elsie Arnson, organist and choir director, 1915
- K. M. Chworowsky, organist 1915

2. The Rev. Howard E. Snyder, pastor, 1916–1918

- The Rev. Norman D. Goehring, interim pastor, 1918; acting pastor, 1918-1919; pastor for student, 1919–1920

3. The Rev. A. J. Soldan, pastor, 1919–1929

- Alexander R. Graham, Sunday school superintendent, 1922-1929
- Fletcher Wheeler, organist and musical director, 1923–1924
- Arthur Bertelsen, organist and choir director, 1924–1926
- Lydia Rodruan, choir director, 1926
- Paul Jones, organist, 1926
- Dr. Sigfrid Prager, choir director, 1926
- Donald Larson, organist, 1928–1939

4. The Rev. Carroll J. Rockey, pastor 1929–1936

- Frank A. Kuehl, Sunday school Seperintendent, 1929
- Alvin Gillette, choir director
- E. Earle Sweeney, director of music, 1931–1942
- A. C. Johnson, Sunday school superintendent
- C. A. Rowley, Sunday school superintendent
- The Rev. Edward J. Blenker, interim pastor. 1937; pastor for students, 1937–1941

5. The Rev. Edwin Moll, pastor, 1937–1939

- Miss E. Grace Soderberg, parish worker, 1940-1956
- Gilman J. Voss, Sunday school superintendent, 1942

6. The Rev. Charles A. Puls, pastor 1940–1962

- Ruth Pilger Andrews, organist, 1939–1942
- The Rev. George E. Dressler, assistant pastor 1945–1947
- The Rev. Robert A. Bartels, assistant pastor, 1948–1950
- Larry Kelliher, organist-choir director 1950–1951
- Sister Marian Maurer, deaconess, 1950–1951
- The Rev. Kenneth Wieg, assistant pastor and director of religious education, 1951–1953
- David K. Blamchar, organist-choir director, 1951–1952
- The Rev. Henry B. Kleinert, assistant pastor, 1951–1953
- The Rev. Earl M. Fritz, assistant pastor, 1955–1957
- William Poenichen, parish worker, 1955–1957
- The Rev. Franklin A. Swanson assistant pastor 1957–1963
- Gerald Eisely, intern, 1958–1959
- The Rev. Stafford L. Swing, assistant pastor, 1959–1961
- Russell Paxton, choir director and Helen Paxton, choir director, 1952–1971
- Erv Reinhard, director of religious education, 1957-1963; lay assistant, 1963–1976
- Lee Longrie, director of youth activities, 1962–1963

7. The Rev. Frank Efird, senior pastor, 1963–1973

- The Rev. Gerald N. Kissell, assistant pastor, 1963–1965
- The Rev. Alan R. Lindberg, youth pastor, 1963–1967
- The Rev. Robert W. Peterson, associate pastor, 1966–1970
- Billy Baier, youth director, 1968
- Roger Bullis, youth director 1969
- The Rev. Jerome Bengtson, assistant pastor, 1970–1976
- Roger Petrich, the first full-time director of music, 1971–1977

8. The Rev. J. Stephen Bremer, senior pastor, 1973–1990

- Robert Harris, intern, 1974–1975
- Marcelle Wysocki, lay associate (parish worker), 1975–1997
- The Rev. Charles W. Polm II, assistant pastor, 1977–1978
- The Rev. Ted Steege, associate pastor. 1978–1983
- The Rev. Francis Strong, associate pastor, 1984–1986
- Judy Bush, volunteer coordinator, 1985–1990
- The Rev. Kirk Malnor, assistant pastor, 1987–1990
- Bruce A. Bengtson, director of music, 1978–2018
- The Rev. Elmer B. Sterner, interim pastor, 1990

9. The Rev. Harvey Spencer Peters, senior pastor, 1990–1997

- The Rev. Dyan M. LeVander, associate pastor 1990–1995
- Janet Quello, director of education, 1991–1993
- Jeannette Pranke, director of education, 1993–1995
- The Rev. Amy E. Reumann, associate pastor, 1996–1997
- Roban Clagnaz, church administrator, 1993-
- Kathy Wall, director of Child Development Center, 1997-(date needed)

10. The Rev. Shelley Bobb, senior pastor, (date needed)-2007

- The Rev. Timothy Dean, associate pastor,(date needed)-(date needed)
- The Rev. Brad Pohlman, interim senior pastor, 2007–2008
- The Rev. Craig Jan-McMahon, interim associate pastor, 2007–2008
- Kim O'Leary, church administrator, (date needed)-2021

11. The Rev. Franklin Arthur Wilson, senior pastor, 2008–2015

- The Rev. Brad Pohlman, interim associate, then associate pastor, 2008–2015
- Nancy Raabe, Deacon, senior and women's ministries, 2014–2016
- Suelyn Swiggum, Director of Shared Ministry, (date needed)-present
- Suzanne Du Chateau, Director, Luther Memorial Preschool, (date needed)-2015

12. The Rev. Brad Pohlman, senior pastor, 2015–2026

- The Rev. Eric Jones, interim associate pastor, 2015–2016
- The Rev. David Berggren, interim associate pastor, 2015–2016
- The Rev. John A. Worzala Dumke, associate pastor, 2016–2026
- The Rev. Rebecca Ninke, visitation pastor, 2017–2024
- Amy Grunewald Mattison, visitation minister, 2024-present
- Andrew Schaeffer, director of music, 2018–present

13. The Rev. John Worzala Dumke, senior pastor, 2026–present

- The Rev. Brad Pohlman, interim associate pastor, 2026–present
- Amy Grunewald Mattison, visitation minister, 2024-present
- Andrew Schaeffer, director of music, 2018–present
