= Hymn Society of Great Britain and Ireland =

The Hymn Society of Great Britain and Ireland
- Abbreviation: HSGBI
- Formation: 1936; 90 years ago
- Founder: J. R. Fleming
- Members: 450
- Executive President: Martin Leckebusch
- Honorary President: Lord Williams of Oystermouth
- Editor of The Bulletin: Andrew Pratt
- Website: hymnsocietygbi.org.uk

The Hymn Society of Great Britain and Ireland is a not-for-profit organisation in the United Kingdom and the Republic of Ireland which aims to promote the study and use of Christian hymns. As of 2024, the society comprises around 450 members, including hymn writers, composers, editors, and members of the clergy, plus 50 subscribing libraries and institutions.

== History ==
The society was founded in 1936 by Dr J. R. Fleming for the purpose of:

- encouraging study and research in Hymnody
- promoting good standards of hymn-singing
- encouraging the discerning use of hymns and songs in worship
- sponsoring relevant publications

In the years after its creation, the Society set itself the task of updating John Julian's 1892 Dictionary of Hymnology.

== Activity ==
The Society's primary actions are the production of a Newsletter and Bulletin four times per year containing articles and research on hymns and hymnody, as well as publishing additional Papers on topics in greater depth. It also works closely with sister Societies around the world, including the Hymn Society in the United States and Canada and International Arbeitsgemeinschaft für Hymnologie in Germany.

Each July, the Society holds a three-day conference of talks and workshops, culminating in a large event known since 2003 as The Festival of Hymns, and prior to that was called the Act of Praise. The first Conference was held in Oxford in 1948.

=== Act of Praise / Festival of Hymns ===
A central part of the Hymn Society's annual Conference, the Festival of Hymns (or Act of Praise as it was known prior to 2003) has been held in the following locations.

Year	Location
1948	Mansfield College, Oxford
1949	not held
1950	Jesus College, Cambridge
1951	Oxford
1952	not held
1953	Church of the Holy Trinity, Stratford-upon-Avon
1954	Victoria Hall, Sheffield
1955	not held
1956	West Croydon Methodist Church
1957	Highbury Congregational Church, Bristol
1958	Mansfield College, Oxford
1959	Canterbury Baptist Church
1960	Emmanuel Congregational Church, Cambridge
1961	The chapel, Lambeth Palace
1962	Tyndale Baptist Church, Bristol
1963	Malvern College Chapel
1964	St Nicholas' Church, East Dereham
1965	Charterhouse School Chapel
1966	Little St Mary's, Cambridge
1967	St Mary's Church, Primrose Hill
1968	Cheltenham College Chapel
1969	Liverpool Anglican Cathedral
1970	Charterhouse School Chapel
1971	St Mary's Baptist Church, Norwich
1972	St Mary Redcliffe, Bristol
1973	Nottingham Cathedral
1974	Wesley Chapel, York
1975	Tabernacle Chapel, Cardiff
1976	Norwich Cathedral
1977	Salisbury Cathedral
1978	Manchester Cathedral
1979	Carrs Lane Church, Birmingham
1980	Southernhay United Reformed Church, Exeter
1981	Keble College, Oxford
1982	Gloucester Cathedral
1983	Durham Cathedral
1984	Chichester Cathedral
1985	Methodist Central Hall, Coventry
1986	Guildford Cathedral
1987	Leeds Parish Church
1988	Tyndale Baptist Church, Bristol
1989	Glasgow University Chapel
1990	The Parish Church, Llanfairfechan
1991	St Botolph's Church, Colchester
1992	Church of Our Lady and Saint Nicholas, Liverpool
1993	Winchester United Church
1994	St George's Church, Jesmond
1995	St Philip's Cathedral, Birmingham
1996	St Mary Clement Methodist Church, Truro
1997	St Olave's Church, York
1998	St Mary's Baptist Church, Norwich
1999	St Peter's Church, Lampeter
2000	Christ Church Cathedral, Dublin
2001	Bradford Cathedral
2002	Wesleyan Chapel, Bishop Street, Leicester
2003	Canterbury Cathedral
2004	Canongate Kirk, Edinburgh
2005	Chester Cathedral
2006	St Martin's Church, Dorking
2007	All Saints' Church, Northampton
2008	Church of Our Lady and Saint Nicholas, Liverpool
2009	St Patrick's Cathedral, Armagh
2010	St Oswald's Church, Durham
2011	Waltham Abbey Church
2012	Trinity United Reformed Church, Lancaster
2013	Derby Cathedral
2014	St Mary's Church, Charlton Kings, Cheltenham
2015	St Columba's United Reformed Church, Cambridge
2016	St Salvator's Chapel, St Andrews
2017	Christ Church, Carmarthen
2018	St Michael & All Angels Church, Cherry Burton
2019	Canterbury Cathedral
2020	not held
2021	not held
2022	Blackburn Cathedral
2023	Bishop Grosseteste University Chapel, Lincoln

== Notable figures ==
The Editors of The Bulletin have been:

- Millar Patrick (1937–47)
- Erik Routley (1948–74)
- Bernard Massey (1974–2001 and 2003–04)
- Christopher Idle (2001–03)
- Andrew Pratt (2004-)
- Martin Leckebusch

== See also ==
- Hymn Society in the United States and Canada
