= Gates of Heaven Synagogue =

Historic synagogue in Madison, Wisconsin

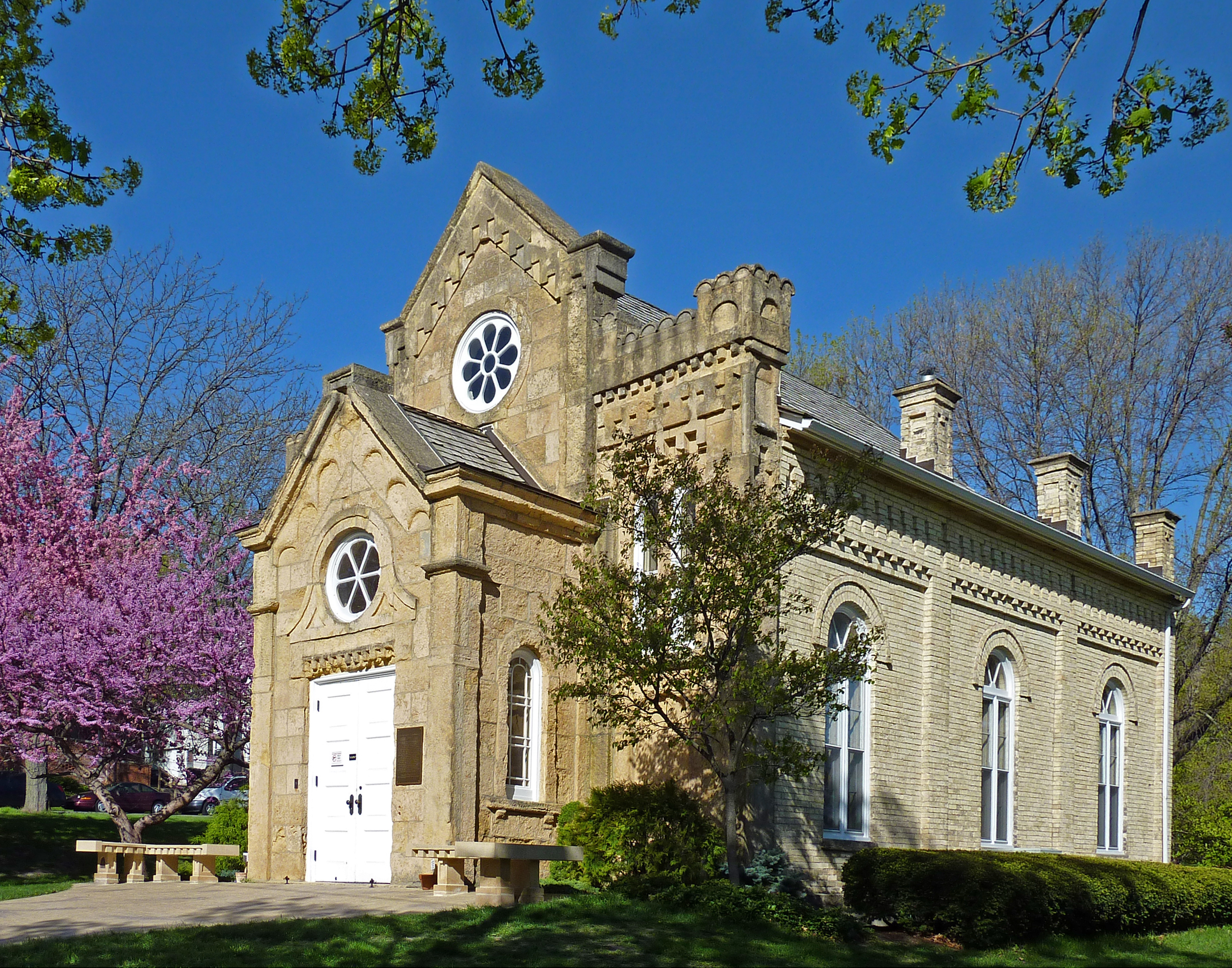
- The former synagogue building, in 2012

- Location of the former synagogue in Wisconsin

Religion
- Affiliation: Judaism (former)
- Ecclesiastical or organisational status: Synagogue (1863–1879); Various uses (1879–1970); Event venue (since 1972)
- Status: Closed (as a synagogue); Repurposed (commercial use)

Location
- Location: 302 East Gorham Street, Madison, Wisconsin
- Country: United States
- Coordinates: 43°4′47.8″N 89°23′5.5″W

Architecture
- Architect: August Kutzbock
- Style: Romanesque Revival
- Established: 1856 (as a congregation)
- Completed: 1863
- Gates of Heaven Synagogue
- U.S. National Register of Historic Places
- NRHP reference No.: 70000030
- Added to NRHP: December 29, 1970

The Gates of Heaven Synagogue, also known as the Old Synagogue, is a historic synagogue in Madison, Wisconsin, United States, designed by German immigrant architect August Kutzbock and constructed in 1863 for the Gates of Heaven congregation. The congregation that commissioned the synagogue was a group of 17 German-speaking Jewish families that met within the building until financial difficulties obliged them to rent it to numerous tenants from 1879, until finally selling the building in 1916. The synagogue was then sold to a succession of owners, and was at various times a dentist's office, a funeral home, and the office of US Congressman Robert Kastenmeier.

In 1970, the synagogue was set to be demolished, but was spared for concerned members of the community to raise money to move the synagogue to a new site. The synagogue was moved to James Madison Park in July 1971 after a fundraising effort supported by the citizens of Madison, the Taychopera Foundation historical preservation fund, and the federal Department of Housing and Urban Development.

The Gates of Heaven Synagogue is one of the oldest synagogues in the United States. It was added to the National Register of Historic Places on December 29, 1970. It now serves as an event venue, although it continues to host Jewish ceremonies and High Holy Days services.

== History ==
The first Jewish residents of Madison were German-speaking immigrants from Bohemia who began arriving in the area in the 1850s. In March 1856, the seventeen Jewish families then present in Madison established a synagogue, becoming the second Jewish community in Wisconsin. The congregation was originally named Ahavath Achim (translated from Hebrew as "Brother Love") and later changed to Shaare Shomaim (translated from Hebrew as "Gates of Heaven"). The synagogue adhered to the Reform movement. In 1859, the congregation bought a plot of land in the newly established Forest Hill Cemetery for use as a Jewish burial ground.

Until 1861, the synagogue met in the home of Samuel Klauber, its treasurer and the first Jewish resident of Madison. A commission for the construction of a religious edifice to house the congregation was organized in 1862. The architect the commission selected to design the synagogue building was August Kutzbock, a German immigrant who designed several buildings in Madison through the 1850s, including the original city hall and the home of Governor Leonard Farwell.

In October 1862, the congregation purchased a lot at 214 West Washington Avenue, next to a congregational church. The foundation of the Gates of Heaven Synagogue was finished by April 10, 1863, and was fully finished and consecrated on September 5 by a rabbi from Milwaukee. Attendees at the consecration included the Governor of Wisconsin, Mayor of Madison, members of the Wisconsin Supreme Court, and Kutzbock. Construction of the synagogue cost $3000 ($78,446 in 2025). Following the assassination of Abraham Lincoln in 1865, the Wisconsin Legislature met for a memorial service at the Gates of Heaven synagogue.

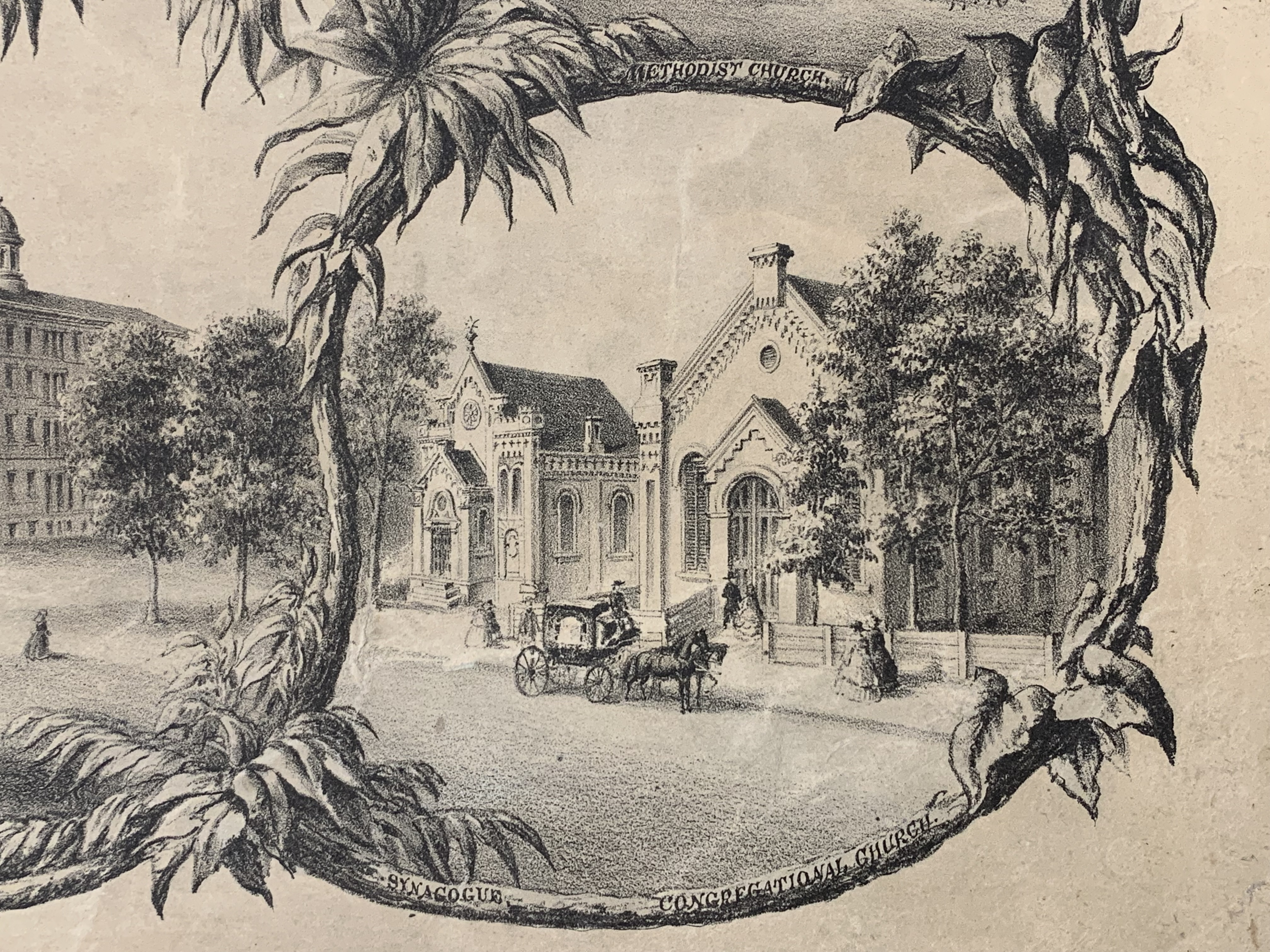
1864 illustration of the synagogue and congregational church in their original location on West Washington Ave

The Gates of Heaven congregation never exceeded twenty families, nor was it served by an ordained rabbi. The brother of one of its members, Joseph M. Thuringer, came from Germany to serve as the congregation's rabbi at its invitation. The fortunes of the congregation declined through the 1870s and they began leaving Madison throughout the decade. By 1878, the congregation had shrunk to six members.

In 1879, the congregation rented the building to the First Unitarian Society of Madison until it moved out in 1885, then to the Women's Christian Temperance Union in 1890, the First Church of Christ, Scientist, in 1898, and then the English Lutheran Church in 1908. The Jewish congregation sold the synagogue in 1916, providing $1,500 ($44,381 in 2025) to the city for the perpetual care of the Jewish graves in Forest Hill Cemetery. The remaining money from the synagogue's sale was distributed to various charitable causes, including the Madison General Hospital, relief for Jews in Europe, the Chinese Famine Fund, and the Palestine Foundation Fund. The congregation's Torah scroll was donated to the Orthodox synagogue in Madison, Agudas Achim. The congregation held its last meeting in 1922, after meeting in members' homes for decades. Throughout its existence from 1856 to 1922, the Gates of Heaven congregation kept detailed records of its meetings, which are now held by the American Jewish Historical Society in New York City.

The synagogue was purchased in 1916 by Arthur and George Gil, who used the building for their funeral home until they sold the building in 1930. Subsequently it was a hotel, a warehouse for government documents during World War II, a church, a dentist's office, a veterinary clinic, and finally the office of United States House of Representatives member Robert Kastenmeier.

=== Threat of demolition and preservation ===
By 1970, the Gates of Heaven synagogue—by then known as the Old Synagogue—was owned by the Fiore Coal and Oil Company. On July 20, 1970, a permit for the synagogue's demolition was obtained to make way for development. Manfred Swarsensky, rabbi of the nearby Temple Beth El and historian of the Jews in Madison, despaired of the possibility of preserving the synagogue. Norton Stoler, a local who had unsuccessfully attempted to raise funds to move and preserve a historic farmhouse, approached Fiore the following day about the possibility of moving the synagogue. On July 23, Fiore granted a six-month grace period for the possibility of fundraising and the moving of the synagogue to a new site, which was estimated to cost between $20,000 ($248,715 in 2025) and $100,000 ($829,049 in 2025).

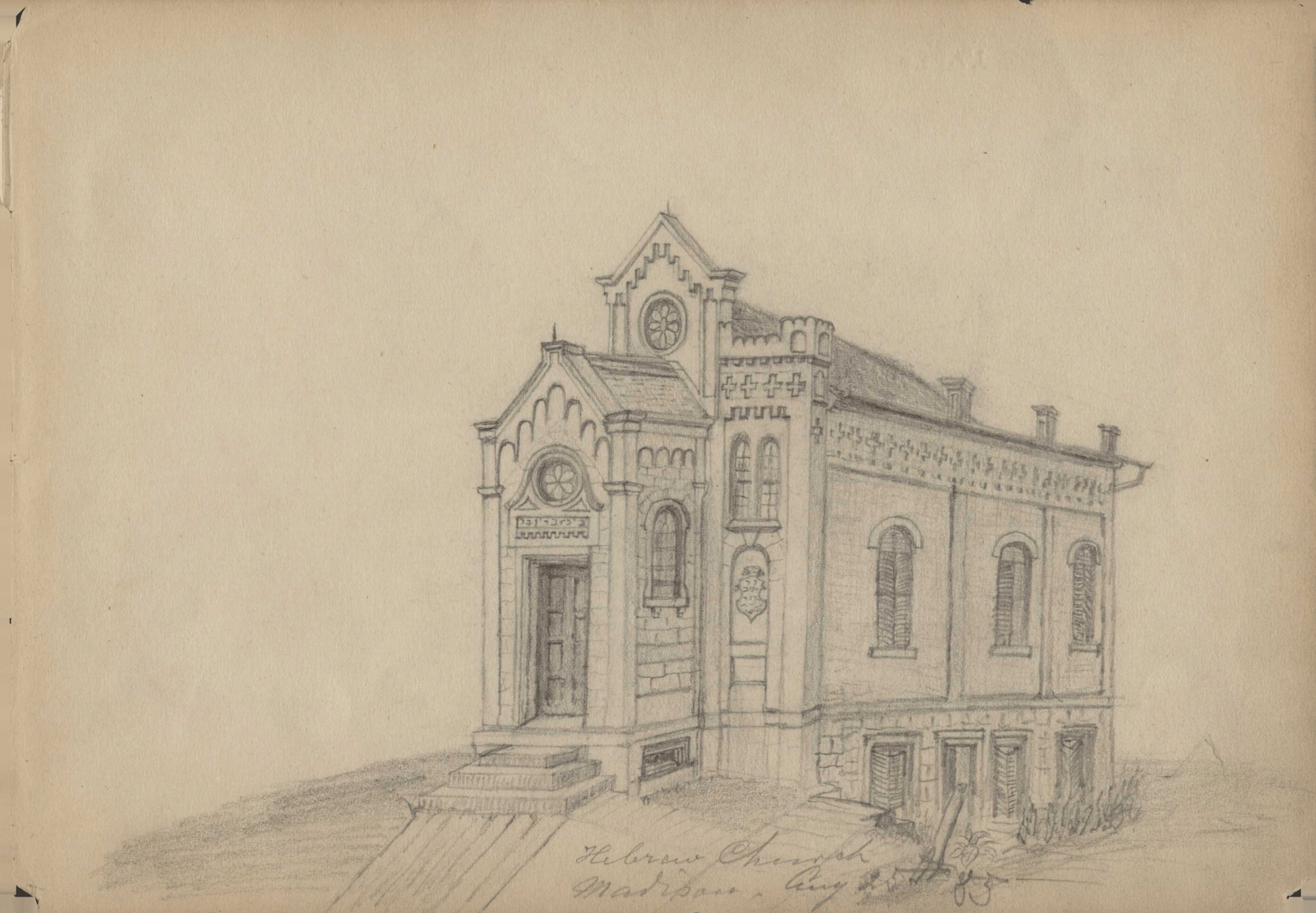
1885 sketch of the building, when it was in use as a Unitarian church

To raise money for the synagogue's preservation, Norton and Lois Stoler established the Gates of Heaven Synagogue Preservation Fund in September and led its fundraising efforts. Supported by Fiore via the donation of Kastenmeier's rent and the Taychopera Foundation, a local historical preservationist organization, and the city government, the Fund raised $15,715 ($124,932 in 2025) in cash donations and at least $13,500 ($107,323 in 2025) in services and materials, which was bolstered by a $29,500 ($234,521 in 2025) matched grant from the Department of Housing And Urban Development in May 1971. Other donors included the Madison Fire Department and Oscar Mayer. On December 17, 1970, Donald N. Anderson of the Wisconsin Historical Society nominated the Gates of Heaven Synagague for inclusion on the National Register of Historic Places (NRHP) as the Old Synagogue. The nomination was received on December 22 and was approved, and thus the synagogue included on the Register, on December 29. At the time, the city's Department of Housing and Development was headed by Sol Levin, who took an interest in the project and was granted the opportunity to supervise the project from then on.

On January 6, 1971, the Madison City Park Commission approved a request to relocate the Gates of Heaven Synagogue to a site in James Madison Park. Fiore set May 1 as the deadline for removing the Gates of Heaven synagogue, and sold the plot under the synagogue to the David Murdock Development Company, which was to construct a ten-story office building for the Madison Bank and Trust Company. In response to public pressure, Murdock extended the grace period to July 10. Despite broad local support for the preservation efforts, the project faced some opposition. A city council meeting in June was adjourned early, preventing the alders from voting on a contract to move the synagogue. One alderman who voted for the adjournment and opposed the moving project described the synagogue as a "junk pile" and "a waste of taxpayers' money". Ultimately, the City Council approved the move, overruling an objection by a landlord near James Madison Park who complained that the synagogue would be an "eyesore".

Although the synagogue was mounted on 96 wheels by July 13, the move was delayed by a member of the Park Commission on July 8, and again on July 10 because of concerns about the synagogue's structural stability. On July 16, 1971, the synagogue was finally rolled through downtown Madison with the aid of two World War II tank retrievers, a hoist truck, the Belding Moving Company of Chicago, and city workers. The moving process lasted over 9 hours; it began at 10am and concluded at 7:20pm.

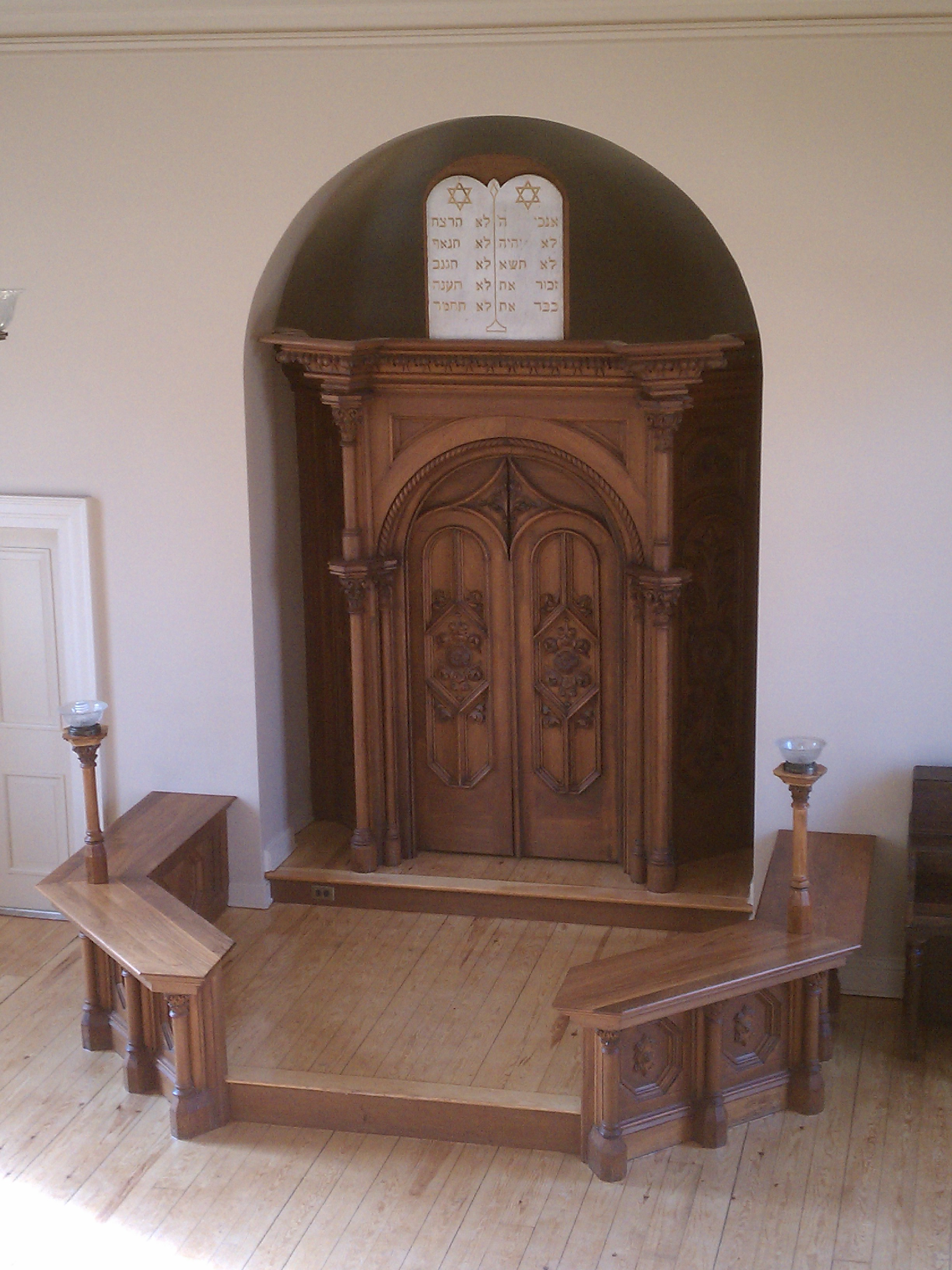
The Ark inside the synagogue

=== Restoration work ===
After the 1971 move to James Madison Park, local firm Historic Mineral Point Inc. took over responsibility for restoration of Gates of Heaven. The firm reconstructed the choir loft, which had been removed years earlier. B'nai Jeshurun Synagogue in Milwaukee donated a hand-carved Torah ark from 1858, which was then refinished and reconfigured to fit into Gates of Heaven. Polychrome wall painting and floral designs on the ceiling were discovered, but the budget was not sufficient to restore them. The facade was weather-proofed and repaired, preserving the original sandstone. The restoration of the lower level was funded by the local American Bicentennial Committee, and the Gates of Heaven Preservation Committee worked on the upper level. After the building was moved, its lower floor was named the Klauber Hall.

The first wedding in the synagogue in over 100 years took place on August 5, 1972, while restoration work was still ongoing. On August 11, 1996, locals held a celebration of the 25th anniversary of the synagogue's move and subsequent restoration work; over $150,000 had been spent on restoring the building at that point. Another restoration project was undertaken in 2021, in which windows were replaced, the floor was refinished, and the masonry was repaired and cleaned.

=== Modern use ===
Gates of Heaven is owned and maintained by the Madison Parks Department, and has become a popular space for weddings and other events. It has also hosted High Holy Day celebrations and other Jewish ceremonies. Diplomat Hannah Rosenthal has led the High Holy Day services since the early 1980s, accompanied by musician Ben Sidran. The synagogue has been the site of neo-pagan winter solstice celebrations, and serves as a polling location.

On September 20, 2017, the day before Rosh Hashanah, swastikas and the words "TRUMP RULES" and "Antifa sucks" were found spray painted on a stone memorializing the Abraham Lincoln brigade near the synagogue. On November 18, 2023, members of the neo-Nazi group Blood Tribe marched through the downtown, stopping at the State Capitol and Gates of Heaven. They shouted racial slurs and threats at bystanders.

== Site and architecture ==
The Gates of Heaven Synagogue is located in the James Madison Park in Madison, Wisconsin, at 302 E. Gorham St. The Society of Architectural Historians describes the synagogue as belonging to the Romanesque Revival style of architecture. In its nomination form for the NRHP, it was described as "reflecting a degree of Victorian eclecticism, with Gothic influences and facade ornamentation reminiscent of old Spanish mission architecture of the southwestern US." Ada Louise Huxtable, an architecture critic writing in The New York Times, identified the synagogue with the Rundbogenstil style, a German variant of Romanesque Revival architecture. In a 1986 study of historic Jewish structures in the United States, historian Mark W. Gordon identified the Gates of Heaven Synagogue as being among the oldest surviving synagogues in the nation.

The building measures 28 by 51 feet (8.5 m × 15.5 m) and is constructed from sandstone and brick. The primary facade and basement walls comprise the sandstone portions of the building while the other walls are made of brick. The primary facade is castellated and features an end gable raised above the roof and a circular window. A vestibule attached at its center forms the synagogue's entryway and repeats the general shape of the greater facade with the addition of a flat cap at the top of the gable and pilasters at the corners. Pilasters divide the sides of the synagogue into three bays, which each house a window. A frieze of Greek crosses runs along the top of the side walls, which are topped by a series of chimneys—four on the right side of the building and three on the left. It is not known for certain what the interior looked originally like, but investigation in January 1971 revealed that the ceiling was painted blue with silver stars. The Torah ark, dating to 1858, is made of black walnut.

== See also ==
- National Register of Historic Places listings in Madison, Wisconsin
