= Mark Warren =

Mark Warren may refer to:

- Mark Warren (footballer) (born 1974), English defender
- Mark Warren (referee) (born 1960), British football (soccer) official
- Mark Warren, member of the British music group zoviet*france:
- Mark Warren (TV director) (1938–1999), American television and film director
- Mark E. Warren, American political philosopher

== See also ==
- Marc Warren (disambiguation)
