= Erik Routley =

English Congregationalist and hymnologist (1917–1982)

- Born: 31 October 1917; Brighton, United Kingdom
- Died: 8 October 1982 (aged 64); Nashville, Tennessee, United States
- Education: Lancing College; Magdalen College, Oxford; Mansfield College, Oxford
- Occupations: Congregational churchman, theologian, musician, hymnologist

Erik Reginald Routley (/ˈraʊtli/ ROWT-lee; 31 October 1917, Brighton, UK – 8 October 1982, Nashville, Tennessee) was an English Congregational churchman, theologian, musician, and prominent hymnologist.

== Career ==
His nearly 40 books on theological thought and music of the Christian church are renowned. Raised in Brighton in a Congregational family, he spent his formative years at Lancing College in West Sussex. In 1936, he received an exhibition to Magdalen College, Oxford, and afterward ministerial training at Mansfield College, Oxford. Ordained in 1943, Routley held pastorates in Wednesbury and Dartford before returning to Mansfield in 1948 as Chaplain, Lecturer, Librarian, and Director of Music. In 1953, he was named to the Mackennal Chair of History. It was during these years that he became visible as an historian and hymn expert. He was also Chaplain of the Oxford Congregationalist Society and left a significant positive imprint on those he worked with. He joined the Hymn Society of Great Britain and Ireland in 1943 and became Editor of the Bulletin, their quarterly newsletter, for 27 years. He also wrote regularly for The British Weekly and the Congregational Monthly. His Oxford DPhil thesis (1951), The Church and Music: An enquiry into the history, the nature and scope of Christian judgement on music became the source for much of his writing for the rest of his life.

In 1945, Routley was placed on the committee for producing a new hymnal, Congregational Praise and eventually wrote its musical companion. The hymnal was launched in 1951 and was the first of over 15 hymnals and supplements that he either edited, co-edited, or consulted over the next thirty years. His first book, I'll Praise My Maker (1951) was quickly followed by Hymns and Human Life, and Hymns and the Faith. These became classics almost immediately amongst clergy and church musicians. Because of this, he was in strong demand as a lecturer at universities, seminaries, and music societies in the US and Great Britain. In 1959, Routley returned to congregational ministry in Edinburgh at Augustine-Bristo Congregational Church, where he remained until 1967. While in Scotland, he and Ian Fraser organized the Dunblane Music Consultations out of which sprung the seminal methods and possibilities for structuring hymnody in the US and UK until the present. In 1965, Routley was named a Fellow of The Royal School of Church Music, the first non-Anglican to receive this honor.

In 1967, Routley became the minister at St. James's Congregational Church in Newcastle, continuing his prolific writing and speaking output, and was elected President of the Congregational Union of England and Wales in 1970. That same year, Routley was made a Fellow of Westminster Choir College in Princeton, New Jersey. The Princeton Theological Seminary brought Routley to the US in 1975 as a lecturer and Director of Chapel. In September of that year, Routley became a Professor of Church Music and Director of Chapel at Westminster Choir College. In September 1982, Routley completed his last editorial project, the hymnal Rejoice in the Lord commissioned by the Reformed Church in America. After giving an introductory lecture on the hymnal, he flew to Nashville on 7 October to address a church music conference. He died in his sleep that same night following a heart attack. Routley was posthumously named a Fellow of the Hymn Society in the United States and Canada, in 1985.

== Personal ==
In 1944, he married Margaret Scott in the Chapel at Mansfield College. They had three children.

== Works ==
Routley wrote compositions for piano, violin, and organ; over 120 hymn tunes and 40 texts. Routley's works are listed in:

- Duty and Delight: Routley Remembered. Robin Leaver and James Litton, eds. Carlton Young, Executive Editor. Hope Publishing/Canterbury Press. 1985.
- Our Lives Be Praise: The Hymn Tunes, Carols and Texts of Erik Routley. Carlton Y. Young, ed. Hope Publishing: Carol Stream IL 1990.
