= James Madison Park =

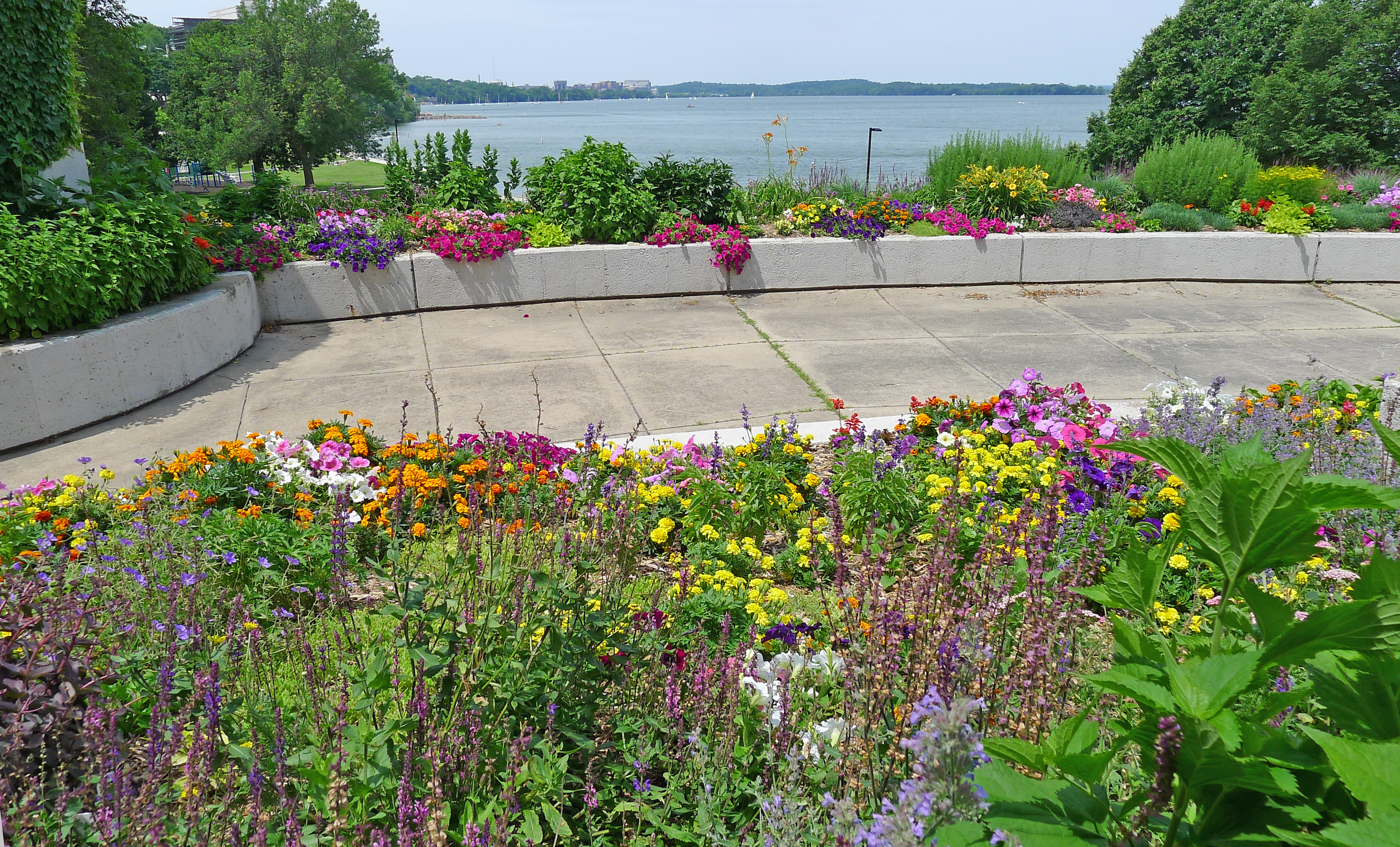
- Garden on the James Madison shelter roof, c. 2014
- Interactive map of James Madison Park
- Location: Madison, Wisconsin
- Coordinates: 43.08126°N 89.38319°W
- Area: 12.63-acre (51,100 m^{2})
- Operator: City of Madison
- Public transit: Metro Transit

James Madison Park is a 12.63-acre (51,100 m^{2}) waterfront park located on Lake Mendota in Madison, Wisconsin. It is owned by the city of Madison.

== Gates of Heaven Synagogue ==
The park is the home of the Gates of Heaven Synagogue (Shaarei Shamayim). The 1863 building, a popular site for weddings of all faiths, is the eighth-oldest synagogue building still standing in the United States. In the 1970s it was purchased by the city, restored, and moved to the park.

== Bernard - Hoover Boat House ==
The park is also home to the Bernard - Hoover Boat House. This is owned by the City of Madison, and occupied by Mendota Rowing Club.
