= Ruth Messenger =

American historian (1884–1964)

- Born: Ruth Ellis Messenger; February 29, 1884; New York City, New York
- Died: March 4, 1964 (aged 80)
- Education: Normal College of the City of New York (A.B.); University of Illinois (A.M.); Columbia University (Ph.D)
- Occupation: Historian
- Awards: Phi Beta Kappa Society

Ruth Messenger (February 29, 1884 – March 3, 1964) was an American historian of medieval hymns.

== Life and work ==
Messenger was born in New York City, New York, on February 29, 1884. She graduated from Normal College of the City of New York in 1905 with a Bachelor of Arts degree and was a member of Phi Beta Kappa society. Two years later, she was appointed an instructor at the Hunter College High School. She was awarded her Master of Arts degree at the University of Illinois in 1911 and her Ph.D. in 1930 by Columbia University. Three years later she was appointed assistant professor in history at Hunter College and retired from there with the rank of full professor in 1950. Messenger then taught hymnology at the Union Theological Seminary in New York.

She published The Medieval Hymn in 1953 and was associate editor and then editor of The Hymn which was published by the Hymn Society of America from 1954 to her death on March 3, 1964. She helped to edit A Short Bibliography for the Study of Hymns, but it was not published after her death.
