= Donald Hustad =

Donald Paul Hustad (October 2, 1918 – June 22, 2013) was a recognized leader in evangelical church music for six decades. Although he was an esteemed musician, composer, and teacher, Hustad's richest legacy resides in his informed criticism of evangelical church music and his well-developed philosophy of worship communicated through lectures, articles, and books.

== Early life ==
=== Family ===
Born to Peter and Clara Hustad on October 2, 1918, in Yellow Medicine County, Minnesota, Hustad was a toddler when his father was killed in a hunting accident. Clara moved with her two sons to Boone, Iowa, where they lived in a church-related institution for indigent people. While the extremely conservative religious environment was repressive, the institution provided Hustad with unique music and work opportunities. His formal music training began with piano lessons at the age of four, and when he was eight he was playing gospel hymns in public worship and providing improvised accompaniments for the institution's Christian radio station. By the end of grade school he had learned Beethoven’s "Pathetique" Sonata, Opus 13, and Liszt’s transcription of the second Hungarian Rhapsody.

Early in his career, Hustad married Ruth McKeag. Hustad credited Ruth with supporting his career, as she devoted her life to her husband and children. Ruth's roles as secretary and research assistant were also significant, aiding Hustad in his writing and composition projects.

=== Early influences ===
The basic tenets of Hustad’s Christian faith were established while he was a child and later enriched by theological study. During his youth, he enjoyed listening to lawyers defend their cases at the local courthouse, and he developed an admiration for logic and debate. His later desire to construct a philosophy of church music that could withstand the rigors of liturgical and musicological debate stemmed from both his theological study and his interest in logical discourse. Hustad’s life was woven from these varied strands—a fragmented family unit, a conservative theological atmosphere, diverse musical styles, and learning opportunities afford by school, church, and local courtroom.

== Career ==
=== Early career ===
Hustad’s musical skills provided the financial support needed during his undergraduate education at John Fletcher College near Oskaloosa, Iowa. In addition to directing the college band and leading a male quartet, he taught himself basic organ technique and became organist at First Methodist Church in Oskaloosa during his last year of school. After graduation in 1940, he moved to the Chicago area, where he was employed as a church organist and continued studies in piano and organ.

==== Radio broadcasts ====
Radio broadcasting consumed Hustad’s time and energy during his early career. He was hired by WMBI in Chicago as a staff musician. George Beverly Shea recalled this encounter in his book, Then Sings My Soul: "Another audition I remember was set up by Aunt Theresa [Worman], who had a friend ‘who should be playing organ for WMBI.’ When we heard him play one number, we knew she was right. Don Hustad was hired on the spot." Hustad performed with featured soloist George Beverly Shea on Club Time, a program of hymns that aired weekly on the American Broadcasting Company radio network. His two-decade tenure as organist for the popular radio series, Songs in the Night, brought him other performing opportunities in the Chicago area. His responsibilities expanded beyond accompanying on piano and organ, to arranging, composing, conducting, producing programs and teaching. He completed a Master of Music degree in 1945 at Northwestern University and held part-time teaching positions at Chicago Evangelistic Institute, Wheaton College, Olivet Nazarene College, and Moody Bible Institute.

=== Moody Bible Institute ===
Hustad taught full-time at Olivet Nazarene College, and part-time at Chicago Evangelistic Institute, Wheaton College, and Moody Bible Institute (MBI) before accepting a full-time appointment as Director of the Sacred Music Department at Moody Bible Institute in 1950. In addition to teaching conducting and working with the Moody Chorale (which achieved international fame under his leadership), he shifted his focus from teaching to administration. Hustad's philosophy of music education espoused the idea that music at a Bible college should be taught at essentially the same level as music at a conservatory. During his years at Moody, he pursued this goal by strengthening the curriculum and recruiting strong faculty.

=== Doctorate ===
Hustad enrolled in Northwestern University's doctoral program in the fall of 1955. His applied performance areas (organ, choral conducting, and service playing) together with his research projects (the choral works of Ralph Vaughan Williams and the organ works of Paul Hindemith) augmented his previous experience and training. Hustad's transition from Director of Music at MBI to full-time organist with the Billy Graham Evangelistic Association allowed him to complete his doctorate in 1963.

=== Billy Graham Evangelistic Association ===
Although Hustad's relationship with the Graham team began in the 1940s, his full-time position as Crusade organist did not begin until 1961. His six years in this role also gave Hustad the opportunity to perform on outstanding instruments around the globe, conduct workshops, give lectures, prepare articles for publication, and create a network of friends and associates. Hustad was valued not only for his creative gifts as organist, but also for his knowledge of hymnody, theological insight, and spirit as a "team" member.

=== Music adviser for Hope Publishing Company ===
During his years at MBI and with the Graham team, Hustad had served as a musical advisor for Hope Publishing Company. Since the 1950s, Hope has published most of Hustad's choral, vocal, and keyboard compositions and arrangements. Hustad held the position of chief editorial consultant with Hope from 1950 to 1961, although his counsel as a musical advisor for the firm continued for three more decades. His knowledge of hymnody and his understanding of trends in church music helped to guide the development of Hope. Hustad's catalog includes over 100 octavos and many vocal and keyboard volumes. Among his editorial contributions are fourteen song books and hymnals, as well as dozens of collections.

=== Southern Baptist Theological Seminary ===
Hustad's twenty-year tenure with the Southern Baptist Theological Seminary began in 1966. This opportunity allowed him to teach courses that paralleled his wide array of interests and offered him flexibility to lecture and perform beyond the seminary. Sabbatical leaves provided time for major writing projects and further study. He also earned diplomas as an Associate of the American Guild of Organists (AAGO) and a Fellow of the Royal College of Organists (FRCO), London. His retirement in December 1986 was in fact only semi-retirement, as he continued to teach courses and offer lectures at the seminary for the next two decades.

=== Publications ===
Beginning with his Moody years, Hustad regularly published articles articulating his insights on church music. Topics ranging from music and worship to gospel hymnody have appeared frequently through the decades. Although his philosophy of church music developed as he matured, its essence was apparent in his early career. At Southern Seminary, he created and taught his signature course, "Music in Worship and Evangelism." This course gave Hustad the opportunity to synthesize and articulate his views, which ultimately became the manuscript for "Jubilate! Church Music in the Evangelical Tradition." This scholarly work and its extensive revision, Jubilate II, have been instrumental in guiding today's evangelical church musicians. Hustad's catalog of written works includes over 100 articles and six books.

== Accolades ==
Accolades and honors highlighted Hustad's significant contributions to evangelical church music. In 1989, he was named a Fellow of the Hymn Society in the United States and Canada, a national award in recognition of his distinguished services to hymnody. He received an honorary doctorate from Samford University in 2006, and in March, 2008, Hustad was honored at the American Choral Director's Association's Southern Division Conference for his contributions to church music. He was a National Patron of Delta Omicron, an international professional music fraternity.
