= Jaroslav Vajda =

American poet

Jaroslav Vajda (April 28, 1919 – May 10, 2008) was an American hymnist.

Vajda was born to a Lutheran pastor of Slovak descent in Lorain, Ohio, where his father, Rev. John Vajda, was a pastor. Vajda's father served parishes in Emporia, Virginia, Racine, Wisconsin, and finally, from 1926 until his retirement, in East Chicago, Indiana at Holy Trinity Slovak Lutheran Church. Vajda's father and mother (Mary Gecy) were both originally from Hazleton, Pennsylvania. Jaroslav had two brothers, Ludovit and Edward, both pastors, now deceased. Vajda himself pastored parishes in Cranesville, Pennsylvania (1945–1949), Alexandria, Indiana (1949–1953), Tarentum, Pennsylvania (1953–1963), and St. Louis, Missouri (1963–1976).

Vajda received musical training in childhood and began translating classical Slovak poetry at age 15, when three delegates from the cultural institute of Slovakia visited his father's home and left a box of books of Slovak literature. Vajda did not write his first hymn until age 49. From that time until his death in 2008 at age 89, he wrote over 200 original and translated hymns that appear worldwide in more than 65 hymnals. He also published two collections of hymn texts, numerous books, translations, and articles. Vajda served on hymnal commissions for Hymnal Supplement (1969) and Lutheran Book of Worship (1978). In recognition of his significant contributions to the world of Christian hymnody, Vajda was named a Fellow of The Hymn Society in the United States and Canada. He also received an honorary doctorate degree from his alma mater, Concordia Seminary, in 2007.

Vajda was a Fellow of the Hymn Society in the United States and Canada, and was the recipient of numerous honorary doctorates recognizing hymnal contributions. After 18 years in a mostly bilingual ministry, he became the editor of This Day Magazine and then became a book editor and developer at Concordia Publishing House. He retired in 1986.

== Hymns ==
List of hymns written or translated by Jaroslav Vajda:

- "A Comet Blazed Across the Skies"
- "A Cuckoo Flew Out of the Wood"
- "A Dove Flew Down from Heaven"
- "A Life Begins, a Child Is Born"
- "A Woman and a Coin"
- "Add One More Song"
- "All Bless the God of Israel"
- "All Glory, Praise, and Blessing"
- "All Things Are Yours"
- "All Who Crave a Greater Measure"
- "Amid the World's Bleak Wilderness"
- "Around the World the Shout Resounds"
- "As Once in Eden Music Filled the Air"
- "As Out of the Stem the Branch Grows"
- "Ascending, Christ Returns to God"
- "Astonished by Your Empty Tomb"
- "Be Happy, Saints"
- "Be Happy, Then"
- "Before the Marvel of This Night"
- "Before Your Awesome Majesty"
- "Begin the Song of Glory Now"
- "Beside Your Manger-bed I Stand"
- "Blessed Be the Precious Baby"
- "Blessed Chosen Generation"
- "Blessed Jesus, Living Bread"
- "Break Forth in Praise to God"
- "Breath of the Living God"
- "By a Lake We Come to Know You"
- "Catch the Vision! Share the Glory!"
- "Christ Goes Before"
- "Christ, Around Your Word Assembled"
- "Christ, My Constant Inspiration"
- "Christ, the Model of the Meek"
- "Christians, Gather Round"
- "Christians, Let Us Remember"
- "Come at the Summit of This Day"
- "Come in Holy Awe and Truth"
- "Come Now, Shepherds, Quickly Come"
- "Come, Lord Jesus, to This Place"
- "Come, Rest a While"
- "Come, Shepherds, Come"
- "Count Your Blessings, O My Soul"
- "Creator, God, Eternal Source of All"
- "Creator, Keeper, Caring Lord"
- "Dear Father God, We Rise to Say"
- "Dear Little Jesus, We Come to Thy Bed"
- "Dearest Lord Jesus, Why Are You Delaying"
- "Delicate Child of Royal Line"
- "Eternal Word, Your Church's Heart and Head"
- "Ever Since the Savior Came"
- "Faithful Christians, One and All"
- "Far From the Time When We Were Few"
- "For Your Mercy I Implore You"
- "From the Shadow of My Pain"
- "Gather Your Children, Dear Savior, in Peace"
- "Gaze in Amazement"
- "Gift of Joy"
- "Give Glory, All Creation"
- "Giver of Every Perfect Gift"
- "Glorious Jerusalem"
- "Glory Be to You, O Father"
- "Go, My Children, with My Blessing (Wedding)"
- "Go, My Children, with My Blessing"
- "God Almighty, Lord Most Holy"
- "God Beyond All Worlds and Time"
- "God First Made a Fruitful Garden"
- "God Has a Plan for All"
- "God of the Sparrow"
- "God the Father of Us All"
- "God, My Lord, My Strength"
- "God, Who Built This Wondrous Planet"
- "God, You Made This World a Garden"
- "Good Shepherd, God's Beloved Son"
- "Greet Now the Swiftly Changing Year"
- "Hail the Savior's Very Body"
- "Hear Me, Help Me, Gracious Savior"
- "Hear Me, O My Precious Love"
- "Heaven's Dawn Is Breaking Brightly"
- "Heralds of the Cross"
- "Here Is the Living Proof, Good Lord"
- "Here We Kneel at Your Feet"
- "Holy Spirit, Gift of God"
- "How Could I Hurt You So"
- "How Lovely and How Pleasant"
- "How Meager and Mundane"
- "How Pleasant, Lord, When Christians Live"
- "How Shall We Thank You, Christ, Our Lord?"
- "Hymn of the Night"
- "I Have a Father You Would Like"
- "I Praise You, Lord, in Every Hour"
- "If God Is Absent, All the Cost"
- "In Bethlehem a Wonder"
- "In Darkest Night"
- "In Hopelessness and Near Despair"
- "In the Streets, in Home and Workplace"
- "Jesus, Come and Crown This Day with Blessing"
- "Jesus, Immanuel"
- "Jesus, Take Us to the Mountain"
- "Jesus, When You Preached"
- "Just As a Happy Bride"
- "Leap, World, for Joy"
- "Let All Who Captive Lie"
- "Let Our Gladness Banish Sadness"
- "Let Us All Give Thanks and Sing"
- "Let Us Praise Our Gracious God"
- "Let Us Sing With Heart and Voice"
- "Light the Candle"
- "Lo, What a Wonder"
- "Look! Judah's Lion Wins the Strife"
- "Lord Jesus Christ, Your Presence Here"
- "Lord of Lords, Adored by Angels"
- "Lord, As You Taught Us Once to Pray"
- "Lord, I Must Praise You"
- "Make Songs of Joy"
- "Mark This Moment and This Place"
- "My Crown of Creation"
- "No Greater Love Was Ever Known"
- "Not in Lightning, Storm, and Thunder"
- "Now Go to Sleep"
- "Now Shine, Bright Glow of Majesty"
- "Now the Silence"
- "Now to This Babe So Tender"
- "Now, at the Peak of Wonder"
- "O Day of Days, the Day I Found"
- "O Dearest Friend"
- "O Father, Send the Spirit Down"
- "O God, Eternal Father, Lord"
- "O Joyous Christmas Night"
- "O Lord, How Shall I Meet You?"
- "Of All God's Gifts"
- "Oh, What Tidings Bright"
- "On a Lonely Field"
- "One by One the Spirit Calls Us"
- "Out of the Forest a Cuckoo Flew"
- "Out to the Hills"
- "Pass in Review"
- "Peace Came to Earth"
- "Readings from Acts, Versified"
- "Remember, Lord, the Times You Called Me"
- "Rise Up, Bethl'em Shepherds, Rise"
- "Rock-a-bye, My Dear Little Boy"
- "See Mary Setting Out at Dawn"
- "See One Born in a Stable Stall"
- "See the Human Heart"
- "See This Wonder in the Making"
- "Shepherds All, Come"
- "Shepherds of Bethlehem"
- "Shine Like Stars"
- "Simon, Simon, Do You Love Me?"
- "Since You Are Risen from the Dead"
- "Sleep Softly, Softly, Beautiful Jesus"
- "Sleep Well, Dear Heavenly Boy"
- "Sleep, My Little One"
- "Slumber, Lovely Baby"
- "So Much to Sing About"
- "Someone Special (Teachers)"
- "Someone Special"
- "Son of God, Which Christmas Is It?"
- "Source of Breath from Time's Beginning"
- "Spirit, God, Eternal Word"
- "Stand Before Me, Lord"
- "Sweetest Song of This Bright Season"
- "Tell Us, Shepherds Why So Joyful"
- "The Best of Gifts"
- "The Friend I Need"
- "The Greatest Joy of All"
- "The Holy Innocents"
- "The King the Wise Men Found"
- "The Ordinary in Hymn Form"
- "The Rescue We Were Waiting For"
- "The Wedding Starts"
- "Then the Glory"
- "There Breaks the Lovely Morning Light"
- "There's a Gathering of Daughters"
- "This Child of Ours"
- "This Glorious Easter Festival"
- "This House with All Its Parts"
- "This Is a Time for Banners and Bells"
- "This Is a Time to Pause and Ask"
- "This Love, O Christ"
- "This Time of Rest"
- "This Touch of Love"
- "Though Mountains Quake and Oceans Roar"
- "Three Angels Are Singing"
- "Through the Din of Life Around Me"
- "To Know God's Love, Behold the Cross"
- "To the Everlasting Hills"
- "To Those Who Seek God's Kingdom First"
- "Today Again, the Gift of Life"
- "Triumphant Lamb and Lord of All"
- "Up Through Endless Ranks of Angels"
- "Up, O Shepherds"
- "Wake to the Wonder"
- "Wake Up, Brother, Listen"
- "Wake, Shepherds, Awake"
- "Walls Crack, the Trumpet Sounds"
- "Weep with Us, Jesus"
- "Welcome in the Name of Christ"
- "What Are You Looking for, Magdalen?"
- "What Love, Lord Jesus, That You Go"
- "What Would the World Be Like?"
- "When God's Dread Judgment Bursts Abroad"
- "When the Seed of Faith Is Planted"
- "When You Woke That Thursday Morning"
- "Where Shepherds Lately Knelt"
- "Where the Swallow Makes Her Nest"
- "Where You Are, There Is Life"
- "While Mary Rocks Her Child to Rest"
- "Who Can Conceive the One True God"
- "Who Could Have Dreamt a Land Like This?"
- "Who Is the One We Love the Most"
- "Who Is This Who Comes from Nowhere?"
- "Who's That Sitting on the Ground?"
- "Witness Our Best Gift from Heaven"
- "Wondering Child of God"
- "World, for All Your Gain and Pleasure"
- "You Are the King"
- "You Are the Rock"
- "You Are the Shepherd"
- "You Have a Special Place"
- "You Hear the Hungry Crying"
- "You Said, Pray Thus"
- "You, Jesus, Are My Shepherd True"
- "Your Brightness, Christ, Consumes the Night"
- "Your Heart, O God, Is Grieved"
- "You're My Good Shepherd"
- "Zion, Dwelling of the Lord"
