= Wesleyan Chapel, Bishop Street =

Wesleyan Chapel
- Bishop Street Methodist Chapel
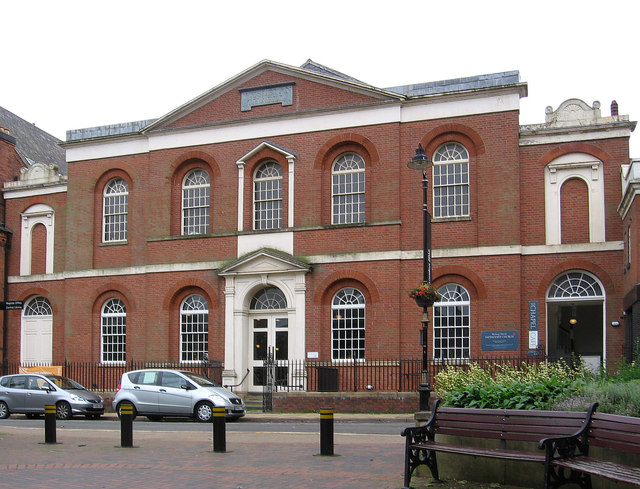
- Wesleyan Chapel
- 52.633162°N 1.1319195°W}
- OS grid reference: SK 58848 04288
- Location: Town Hall Square; Leicester
- Country: England
- Denomination: Methodist
- Website: https://www.bishopstreetchurch.org.uk/

History
- Status: open

Architecture
- Heritage designation: Grade II listed
- Designated: 1950
- Architect: Reverend William Jenkins
- Architectural type: Georgian Neo-Classical
- Groundbreaking: 1815

Bishop Street Methodist Chapel, also known as the Wesleyan Chapel, is a church overlooking Town Hall Square in Leicester, Leicestershire, England.

The chapel was built in 1815 as a Methodist chapel in the Georgian Neo-Classical style by the architect and Methodist minister Reverend William Jenkins (1763-1844). The organ in the chapel predates the chapel itself by over 100 years; the organ case is by "Father" Smith, organ builder to Charles II.

It is a Grade II listed building (1074061) on the National Heritage List for England, added in 1950 as Wesleyan Chapel, Bishop Street. It is part of collection of listed buildings on Bishop Street around Town Hall Square comprising Leicester Town Hall, Fountain and War Memorial, 7–9, Every Street and Nos 6–8, The Royal Hotel, Nos 17, 19 and 21 Horsefair Street.

== See also ==
- John Wesley
- Castle Donington Methodist Church
- Great Glen Methodist Church
- List of Methodist churches (worldwide, including England)
