= Carl Schalk =

American composer (1929–2021)

- Born: September 26, 1929; Des Plaines, Illinois, U.S.
- Died: January 24, 2021 (aged 91); Melrose Park, Illinois, U.S.
- Spouse: Noël Donata (Roeder) Schalk (d. 2016)

Academic background
- Education: Concordia University Chicago, Eastman School of Music, Concordia Seminary

Academic work
- Discipline: Church Music
- Sub-discipline: Composition, hymnology
- Institutions: Concordia University Chicago
- Notable works: Hymn tunes: Manger Song (“Where Shepherds Lately Knelt”); Fortunatus New (“Sing, My Tongue, the Glorious Battle”); Thine (“Thine the Amen, Thine the Praise”); Now (“Now the Silence”); Choral works: “Before the Marvel of This Night”; “Lamentations of Jeremiah”

Carl Flentge Schalk (September 26, 1929 – January 24, 2021) was a noted Lutheran composer, author, and lecturer. Between 1965 and 2004 he taught church music at Concordia University Chicago. During this time he guided the development of the university's Master of Church Music degree, which has since graduated more than 140 students. Schalk was a member of the Inter-Lutheran Commission on Worship, which produced the Lutheran Book of Worship in 1978. He was also the editor of the journal Church Music from 1966 to 1980. Additionally, he was a published composer for Choristers Guild, a member of the Music Advisory Committee of Concordia Publishing House and of the board of directors of Lutheran Music Program, the parent organization of the Lutheran Summer Music Academy and Festival.

Schalk graduated in 1952 from Concordia University Chicago (then known as Concordia Teachers College River Forest) with a B.S. in education and proceeded to earn a M.Mus. from the Eastman School of Music and an M.A.R. from Concordia Seminary in Saint Louis.

Schalk is well known for his numerous choral compositions as well as his hymn tunes and carols, which number over one hundred. He had ongoing collaborations with poets Jaroslav Vajda and Herbert Brokering, producing tunes for several of their hymn texts. Schalk's hymn tunes may be found in modern Christian hymnals of various denominations. He is also the author of several books on Lutheran music and hymnody. In 2013, a critical biography of Schalk written by Nancy Raabe was published, and in 2015, a collection of articles and essays about church music by Schalk was released.

Schalk died on January 24, 2021, in Melrose Park, Illinois, at the age of 91.
