= Marc Miller =

Marc Miller may refer to:

- Marc Wolfgang Miller, American cryptozoologist
- Marc Miller (game designer) (born 1947), American game designer
- Marc Miller (musician) (born 1955), American musician
- Marc Miller (politician) (born 1971), Canadian politician
- Marc Miller (racing driver) (born 1975), American racecar driver

== See also ==
- Mark Miller (disambiguation)
- Mac Miller, American rapper and record producer
