= Ruth C. Duck =

United Church of Christ minister, professor, and composer (1947-2024)

Ruth Carolyn Duck (November 21, 1947 – December 26, 2024) was an ordained pastor in the United Church of Christ, a liturgical theologian and professor of worship who taught for 27 years at Garrett-Evangelical Theological Seminary in Evanston, Illinois. Duck was best known for her work as a composer, writer and adaptor of hymns. In 1973, she was part of the committee at the Ecumenical Women's Center of Chicago that produced Because We Are One People, the first 20th century collection of original and adapted hymns that promoted the use of “non-sexist language”. Duck wrote over 150 hymns, edited three books of sources for worship services and wrote on the topic of Trinitarian theology, all with an eye toward facilitating the use of gender inclusive language in the context of Christian worship. She was a leading champion for and developer of inclusive language worship sources.

== Early life and education ==
Duck was born on November 21, 1947, in Washington D. C., to Jesse Thomas Duck and Louise Farmer Duck. She grew up in the Washington D.C., and Annapolis, Maryland, areas. At the age of 16, she moved with her family to Memphis, Tennessee, where she was exposed to the ministry of Martin Luther King Jr. She received her Bachelor of Arts (B.A.) from Southwestern-at-Memphis University (now Rhodes College) in 1969, a Masters of Divinity (M.Div.) from Chicago Theological Seminary in 1973, a Masters of Arts (M.A.) from the University of Notre Dame in 1987 and a Doctor of Theology (Th.D.) degree in worship and theology from Boston University School of Theology in 1989. Her academic work focused on Christian education, liturgy and worship and the Trinitarian baptismal formula.

== Career ==
Duck was ordained a minister in the United Church of Christ in 1974. She served churches from 1974 to 1989 in Illinois, Wisconsin and Massachusetts. Through her early experiences as a pastor, Duck noticed that the language used in worship books and hymnals to name God was, almost exclusively, masculine. The lack of resources for worship that used inclusive language was the impetus for her production of two inclusive language worship sources, Bread for the Journey: Resources for Worship and Everflowing Streams: Songs for Worship, published by the United Church Press in 1981. Following these experiences, she pursued her Th.D. in worship and theology. After completing her doctorate, she served as a professor of worship at Garrett-Evangelical Theological Seminary from 1989 until her retirement in 2016. Her teaching interests included congregational song, healing and reconciliation, and worship and the arts. She wrote and edited numerous books, articles and worship resources about and for Christian worship. Throughout her career, her focus in her writing and teaching was on the use of inclusive language that enlarges one's sense of God. Brian Wren, a fellow hymnist, states that “Ruth Duck has consistently and persistently sought for worship language that expands our vision of the divine mystery and makes all human beings visible”.

== Hymnist ==
Her work as a hymn writer spanned 40 years from her first works in Because We Are One People and Sing a Womansong in the mid-1970s to her last hymn collection, The Poetry of Grace, published in 2015. Since the 1970s, Duck composed, edited and adapted hymn text for Protestant and Roman Catholic hymnals in the United States, Hong Kong, Australia, Scotland and England. She estimated that she had written “around 150–200” hymn-texts, “about ten a year.” She also served on a number of committees that produced hymnals, such as the Chalice Hymnal for the Disciples of Christ. In her chapter about Ruth C. Duck in the book Primary Sources of Liturgical Theology, Robin Knowles Wallace states that “issues of justice, both local and global, shape her hymns and worship resources.” Duck's concern for the use of alternative language for God is evident in her hymn writing where she consistently used universal and non-gendered language for God. For example, in Welcome God’s Tomorrow: 38 Hymn Texts by Ruth Duck, Duck named God in diverse ways including “Colorful Creator”, "God of Mystery”, “Harmony of Ages”, "Author of Our Journey”, “Poet of the World” and more.

== Honorary degrees and awards ==
Duck received an honorary Doctor of Divinity degree from Chicago Theological Seminary in 1983. She was named president of the North American Academy of Liturgy in 2007 and a Fellow of the Hymn Society in the United States and Canada in 2013. In January 2018, she received the Berakah Award from the North American Academy of Liturgy.

== Selected works ==
=== Books ===
- Worship for the Whole People of God. Louisville: Westminster John Knox, 2013.
- Praising God: The Trinity in Christian Worship (with Patricia Wilson-Kastner), Louisville: Westminster John Knox, 1999.
- Finding Words for Worship: A Guide for Leaders. Louisville: Westminster John Knox, 1995.
- Gender and the Name of God: The Trinitarian Baptismal Formula. New York: Pilgrim Press, 1992.

=== Hymn text ===
- The Poetry of Grace. Carol Stream, IL: Hope Publishing, 2015, ed. Dan Damon.
- Welcome God’s Tomorrow. Chicago: G.I.A., 2005.
- Circles of Care: Hymns and Songs. Cleveland: The Pilgrim Press, 1998.
- Dancing in the Universe: Hymns and songs by Ruth Duck. Chicago: G.I.A., 1993.
- Look to This Day: Songs of the Faith (with Ron Klusmeier), Cascade, Wisconsin: WorshipArts, 1990.

=== Worship resources ===
- Touch Holiness: Resources for Worship (with Maren Tirabassi), New York: The Pilgrim Press, 1990, updated 2012.
- Flames of the Spirit: Resources for Worship, (editor and contributor), New York: The Pilgrim Press, 1985.
- Bread for the Journey: Resources for Worship, (editor and contributor), New York: The Pilgrim Press, 1981.

=== Edited and co-edited hymn resources ===
- Becoming One (with Linda Clark, projector director), (editor and contributor), Boston University School of Theology, 1986.
- Everflowing Streams: Songs for Worship, (Editor with Michael Bausch), (contributor), New York: Pilgrim Press, 1981.
- Because We Are One People and Sing a Womansong, (editorial committee and contributor), Chicago: Ecumenical Women's Center, 1974 and 1975.
