= Mark Miller (composer) =

American composer of Methodist hymns (born 1967)

Mark A. Miller (born 1967) is a composer of Christian anthems and hymns. His work is widely sung and performed within the United Methodist Church and other Mainline Protestant churches. He is currently a Professor of Church Music and Composer in Residence at the Theological School of Drew University, as well as a Lecturer in Sacred Music at Yale Institute of Sacred Music.

== Early life and education ==
Miller was born into a family of United Methodist pastors, including his father and grandfather. He earned a bachelor's degree in music from Yale University in 1989 and a master of music degree in organ performance from the Juilliard School in 1991. In 2025, he was awarded an honorary Doctor of Divinity degree from Christian Theological Seminary.

Miller is married to Michael Murden. They have two children, Keith and Alyse.

== Career ==
Miller is a professor and composer in residence at Drew University, and a lecturer in sacred music at Yale University. He is a Fellow of Hymn Society in the United States and Canada. He serves on the hymnal revision committee for the United Methodist Church.

Miller is one of the most prolific contemporary composers of Christian music, with bestselling compositions including anthems, hymns, choruses, and organ music. His music often references themes of social justice and inclusion. His hymns have been published in hymnals including For Everyone Born: Global Songs for an Emerging Church, Worship and Song, Zion Still Sings, and Voices Together.

== Selected works ==
=== Books ===
- Roll Down, Justice: Sacred Songs and Social Justice (2014)
- "Revolution of the Heart: Songs by Mark A. Miller" (2022)

=== Albums ===
- Imagine the People of God (2013)
- Revolution of the Heart (2024)

=== Hymns and choruses ===
- Child of God
- God Has Work for Us to Do
- I Believe
- Roll Down, Justice!
- Welcome
- Welcome to God's Love
