= Marc Warren (disambiguation) =

Marc Warren (born 1967) is an English television and film actor

Marc Warren may also refer to:

- Marc Warren (television writer) (born 1947), American television producer and writer
- Marc Warren (golfer) (born 1981), Scottish golfer
- Marc Warren (soccer) (born 1992), Australian soccer player

== See also ==
- Marco Warren (1993–2023), Bermudan international footballer
- Mark Warren (disambiguation)
