= Carl P. Daw Jr. =

American Episcopal priest and professor

Carl P. Daw Jr. (born 1944 in Louisville, Kentucky) is an American Episcopal priest. He is curator of hymnological collections and adjunct professor of hymnology at Boston University School of Theology, and was executive director of the Hymn Society in the United States and Canada from 1996 to 2009. In May 2011, he was named a Fellow of the Royal School of Church Music.

== Biography ==
Son of a Baptist pastor, he moved frequently with his father throughout Tennessee during his youth. He obtained his B.A. at Rice University, his M.A. and Ph.D. from the University of Virginia and taught English at the College of William and Mary for eight years before entering the seminary for his M.Div. at the University of the South. He then served at various parishes throughout the Eastern United States before he began work on hymns. He served on the committee that created the 1982 Episcopal hymnal, and served in a variety of roles related to sacred music before his appointment to the directorship in 1996.

== Published works ==
- A Year of Grace: Hymns for the Church Year (1990)
- To Sing God's Praise, in (1992)
- New Psalms and Hymns and Spiritual Songs (1996)
- A Hymntune Psalter (1998–1999)
