= Champlain (disambiguation) =

Samuel de Champlain (1574–1635) was a French explorer.

Champlain may also refer to:

== People ==
- Jacques de Champlain (1938–2009), Canadian scientist, doctor and professor
- Marshall B. Champlain (1822–1879), American lawyer and politician
- Champlain Marcil (1920–2010), Canadian photojournalist

== Places ==
- Champlain Sea, temporary inlet of the Atlantic Ocean
- Champlain Valley, region of the United States around Lake Champlain
- Lake Champlain, natural freshwater lake in North America

=== Canada ===
- Champlain (federal electoral district), a Canadian federal electoral district in Quebec dissolved in 1982
- Champlain (Province of Canada electoral district), a district in the pre-Confederation Province of Canada
- Champlain (provincial electoral district), a Quebec provincial electoral district
- Champlain (Lower Canada), former district in Canada
- Champlain, Ontario, a township in eastern Ontario
- Champlain, Quebec, a town on north shore of the Saint Lawrence River
- Champlain Heights, a neighbourhood in the city of Vancouver, British Columbia, Canada
- Champlain Regional County Municipality, a RCM of Quebec, amalgamated into the expanded city of Longueuil in 2001
- Champlain River, a tributary of the Saint Lawrence River in Quebec
- Lordship of Champlain, granted in 1664, on the north side of the St. Lawrence River between Trois-Rivières and Quebec City
- Champlain Trail Lakes, a group of lakes on the southern point of Whitewater Region in Ontario
- Petit Champlain, a small commercial zone in Quebec City, Quebec, Canada

=== United States ===
- Champlain Clay, a geologic formation in Maine
- Champlain, New York
- Champlain (village), New York
- Champlain, Virginia, an unincorporated community in Essex County, Virginia
- Champlain II (wrecksite), a sidewheel steamer shipwreck archaeological site located in Lake Champlain near Westport in Essex County, New York

== Facilities and structures ==
- Champlain Bridge (disambiguation)
- Champlain Arsenal, a 19th-century fortification near Vergennes, Vermont, USA
- Château Champlain, a historic hotel located in Montreal, Quebec, Canada
- Hotel Champlain, a historic hotel building located in Plattsburgh, New York, USA
- Champlain Apartment Building, listed on the National Register of Historic Places in Washington, D.C., USA
- Mail Champlain (English: Champlain Mall), in Brossard, Quebec, Canada
- Champlain Place, a shopping centre located in Dieppe, New Brunswick, Canada
- Champlain Towers South, Champlain Towers, Surfside, Miami-Dade, Florida, USA; a condominium-apartment building which collapsed in 2021

=== Schools ===
- Champlain College (disambiguation), several educational establishments
- École Secondaire Catholique Champlain, French Catholic school in Chelmsford, Ontario
- Champlain School, a historic former school building at 809 Pine Street in the South End of Burlington, Vermont

== Ships ==
- Le Champlain, the second ship of the Ponant Explorers-class of cruise ships
- MV Champlain, an Empire F type coaster in service with R & D Desgagnes, Quebec
- SS Champlain, a French cabin class ocean liner built in 1932
- HMCS Champlain, Several Canadian naval units
- USS Lake Champlain, one of three ships of the United States Navy
- SS Lake Champlain (1874), 19th century Canadian iron screw-steamer
- SS Lake Champlain (1900), British passenger ship built in 1900
- Champlain II, a sidewheel steamer wrecked in Lake Champlain near Westport in Essex County, New York, USA; the shipwreck now turned into an NRHP archaeological site
- Samuel de Champlain (tugboat), a US-flagged tugboat.

== Other uses ==
- Champlain Housing Trust, a membership-based nonprofit, non governmental organization
- Champlain Society, Canadian text publication society
- Battle of Lake Champlain (1814) at Plattsburgh
- Battle of Lake Champlain (1776) at Valcour Bay
