= Gangway (nautical) =

Narrow walkway platform giving access to a ship or between quarterdeck and forecastle

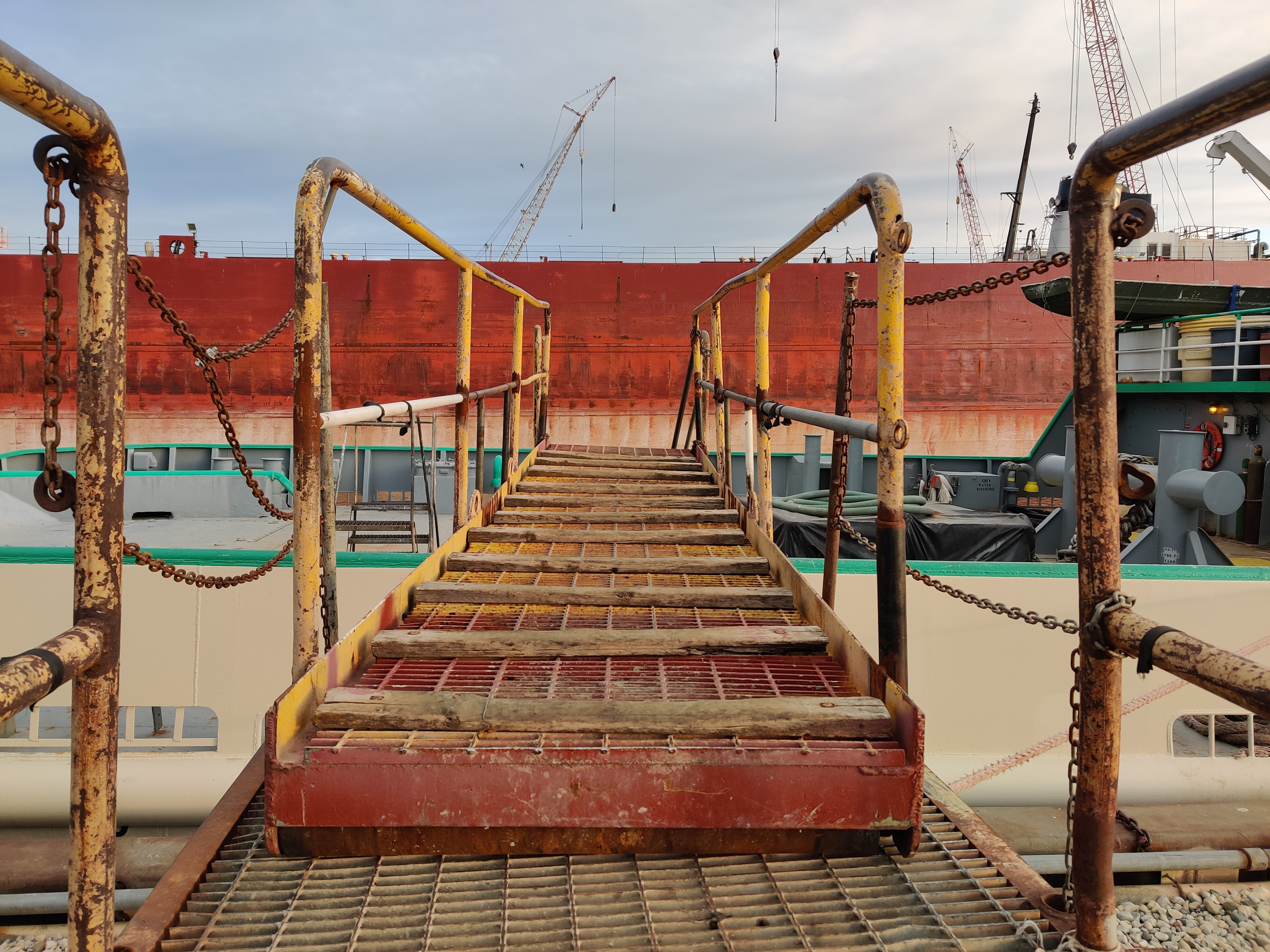
A makeshift gangway provides a safe walkway for workers to board the back deck of the tugboat Samuel de Champlain while docked at a shipyard.

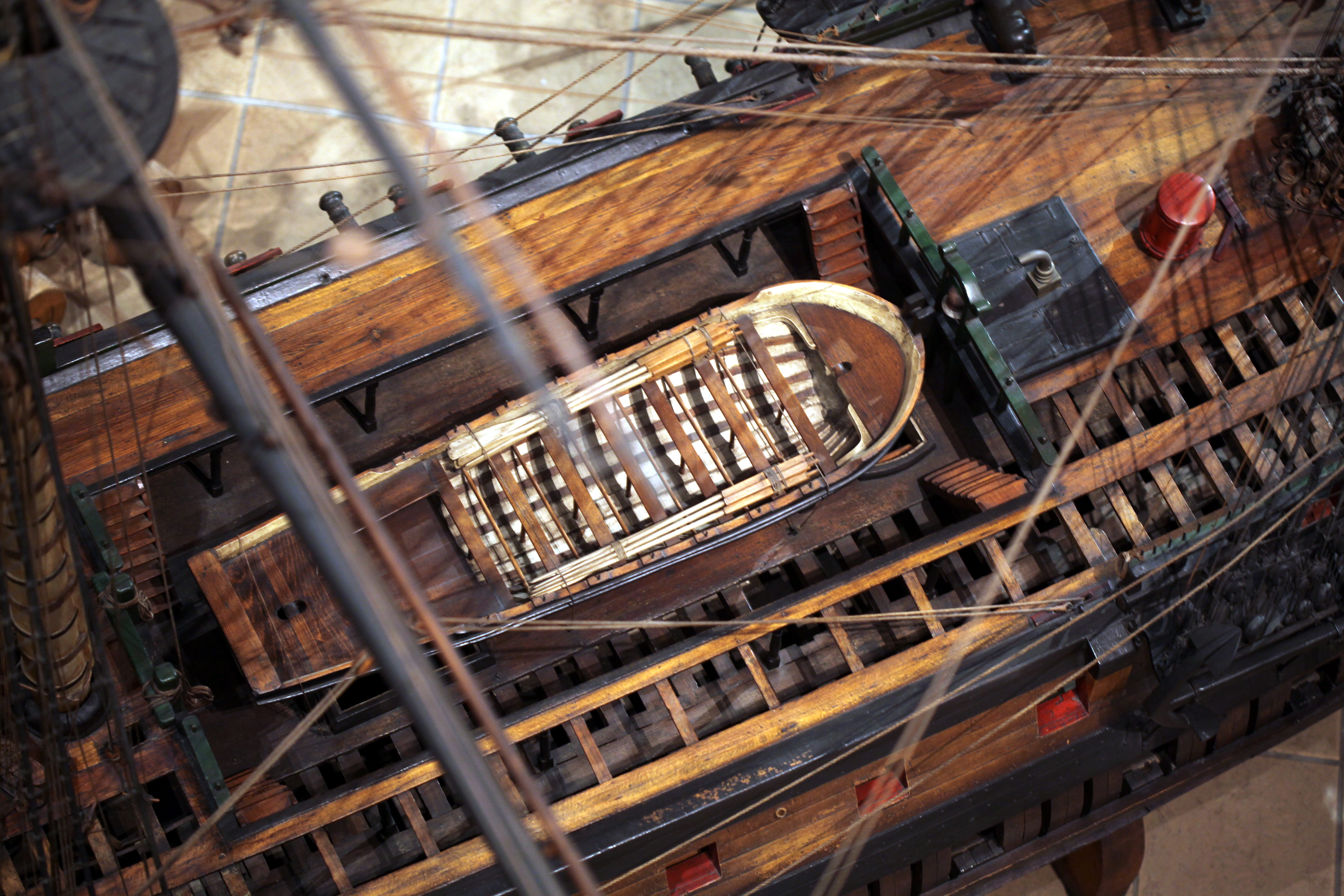
The port and starboard gangways of the Duquesne can be seen at the right and left of the ship's boats. The port side is fully careened, while the starboard side shows the inner structure of the woodwork.

A gangway is a narrow passage that joins the quarterdeck to the forecastle of a sailing ship. The term is also extended to mean the narrow passages used to board or disembark ships.

Modern shipping uses gangways to embark and disembark passengers. Twentieth century extendible gangways used in the Overseas Passenger Terminal in Sydney, Australia are now on the State's heritage list.

== See also ==
- Jet bridge, a movable connector which extends from an airport terminal gate to an airplane
- Linkspan
- Walking the plank
