= 2000 Canadian Grand Prix =

Formula One motor race held in 2000

Coordinates: 45°30′02″N 73°31′21″W

Race 8 of 17 in the 2000 Formula One World Championship
← Previous race	Next race →

Race details
- Date: 18 June 2000
- Official name: Grand Prix Air Canada 2000
- Location: Circuit Gilles Villeneuve, Montreal, Quebec, Canada
- Course: Street circuit
- Course length: 4.421 km (2.747 miles)
- Distance: 69 laps, 305.049 km (189.549 miles)
- Weather: Cloudy and raining; Air 17 °C (63 °F), Track 21 °C (70 °F)

Pole position
Driver	(Germany) Michael Schumacher	Ferrari
- Time: 1:18.439

Fastest lap
Driver	(Finland) Mika Häkkinen	McLaren-Mercedes
- Time: 1:19.049 on lap 37

Podium
First	(Germany) Michael Schumacher	Ferrari
Second	(Brazil) Rubens Barrichello	Ferrari
Third	(Italy) Giancarlo Fisichella	Benetton-Playlife

The 2000 Canadian Grand Prix (formally the Grand Prix Air Canada 2000) was a Formula One motor race held on 18 June 2000 at the Circuit Gilles Villeneuve, Montreal, Quebec, Canada before 100,000 people. It was the eighth round of the 2000 Formula One World Championship and the 38th Canadian Grand Prix. Ferrari's Michael Schumacher won the 69-lap race from pole position. His teammate Rubens Barrichello finished second with Benetton's Giancarlo Fisichella third.

Michael Schumacher led the World Drivers' Championship going into the race, while Ferrari led the World Constructors' Championship. He started alongside McLaren driver David Coulthard after qualifying on pole position. Barrichello began from third, alongside Coulthard's teammate Mika Häkkinen. Michael Schumacher and Coulthard battled for first place until Coulthard served a ten-second stop-go penalty on lap 14 because mechanics worked on his car 15 seconds before the race began. Michael Schumacher took an early pit stop just before half-distance, allowing Barrichello to lead the race until his own pit stop on lap 43. Rain had begun to fall by this point, and drivers had switched to wet-weather tyres. Michael Schumacher maintained his lead for the rest of the race and won by one-tenth of a second over Barrichello.

Michael Schumacher won his fifth race of 2000 and 40th of his career. It increased his lead in the World Drivers' Championship to 22 championship points over Coulthard, with Häkkinen another two championship points behind. Ferrari extended their World Constructors' Championship lead to 18 championship points over McLaren. Benetton demoted the Williams squad to fourth place as a consequence of Fisichella's third-place finish with nine races remaining in the season.

== Background ==
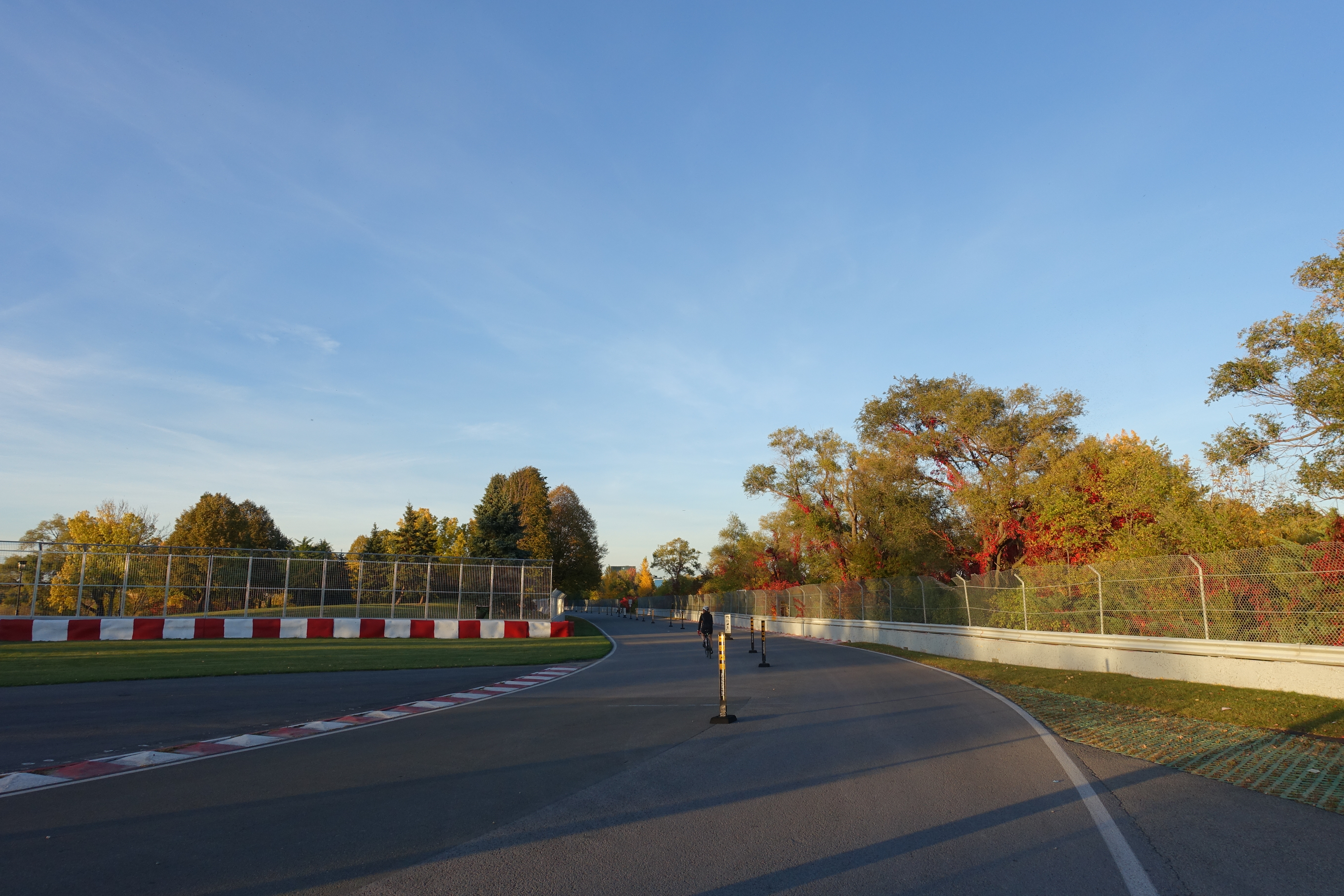
The Circuit Gilles Villeneuve, where the race was held

The 2000 Canadian Grand Prix was the eighth of seventeen events in the 2000 Formula One World Championship and took place at the 4.421 km (2.747 mi) clockwise temporary road course Circuit Gilles Villeneuve in Montreal, Quebec, Canada on 18 June 2000. Sole tyre supplier Bridgestone brought the soft and medium dry compound tyres to the event.

Ferrari's Michael Schumacher led the pre-race World Drivers' Championship with 46 championship points, followed by McLaren's David Coulthard on 34 championship points and his teammate Mika Häkkinen on 29 championship points. Ferrari's Rubens Barrichello was fourth with 22 championship points, while Benetton's Giancarlo Fisichella was fifth with 14 championship points. Ferrari led the World Constructors' Championship with 68 championship points, ahead of McLaren on 63. Williams were third with 15 championship points, Benetton fourth with 14 championship points and Jordan fifth on nine championship points.

The Société de Transport de la Communauté Urbaine de Montréal (STCUM) declared in the weeks preceding up to the event that it would hold strikes over pension fund contributions throughout the Grand Prix weekend. STCUM chose those dates as because public transport was designated as an essential service over the high-profile weekend. The road leading to the circuit would also be closed to spectators. STCUM went before the Essential Services Council on 9 June to discuss developing a contingency plan to ensure spectators could attend the race with full services running. On June 13, a deal was agreed upon, with 60% of transport workers voting in favour of increased pay and pensions, letting the race to continue unaffected.

Following the Monaco Grand Prix on 4 June, the teams tested their low-downforce configurations at the Monza Circuit between 6 and 8 June to prepare for the Canadian Grand Prix. Barrichello set the first day's fastest times, ahead of McLaren test driver Olivier Panis. Testing was halted when Prost's Nick Heidfeld and Luciano Burti both experienced engine and electronic failures respectively. Häkkinen was fastest on the second day. British American Racing (BAR) driver Ricardo Zonta lost control of his car and crashed into the barriers at the Parabolica corner, limiting his testing time as repairs were made to his car. Williams' Jenson Button was quickest on the third day. Ferrari also tested at their private facility, the Fiorano Circuit, with test driver Luca Badoer, who practised pit stops and starts, used different car set-ups, tested new car components and ran on an artificially wet track.

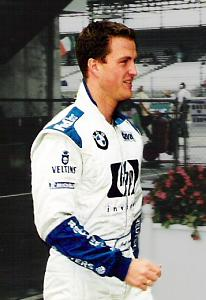
Ralf Schumacher (pictured in 2002) was passed fit to participate in the Grand Prix.

The event included eleven teams (each representing a different constructor) of two drivers each. Ralf Schumacher was passed fit in the days preceding the race. He had a major crash at the Sainte Devote ciorner in the last race, resulting in a 3 in (76 mm) gash on his left calf that required stitches. The Williams team had its test driver Bruno Junqueira ready to participate if Ralf Schumacher was unable to compete. Ralf Schumacher said that he would decide whether to compete after the first free practice sessions. Two days before the race, he confirmed his participation.

Teams approached the Grand Prix by concentrating on their brake cooling systems, installing larger air intakes to adapt to the circuit's braking demands. McLaren installed power steering in their two race cars following six months of testing and research into a low-weight solution. BAR fitted power steering to Jacques Villeneuve's vehicle only for Friday's free practice sessions because the team wanted to introduce it at future events. Arrows, Minardi, Prost, and Sauber were the only teams without power steering. Jaguar did not fit a high load aerodynamic downforce bonnet introduced at the Monaco Grand Prix. Benetton used new front and rear ailerons, while Sauber installed a Ferrari qualifying engine from the 1999 Japanese Grand Prix.

== Practice ==
Before the race on Sunday, there were two one-hour sessions on Friday and two 45-minute sessions on Saturday. The Friday morning and afternoon practice sessions were held in hot, dry weather. Teams made changes to their car setups while drivers tested the updates, reporting on their effectiveness and any concerns. The majority of incidents during Friday practice occurred between turns seven and eight.

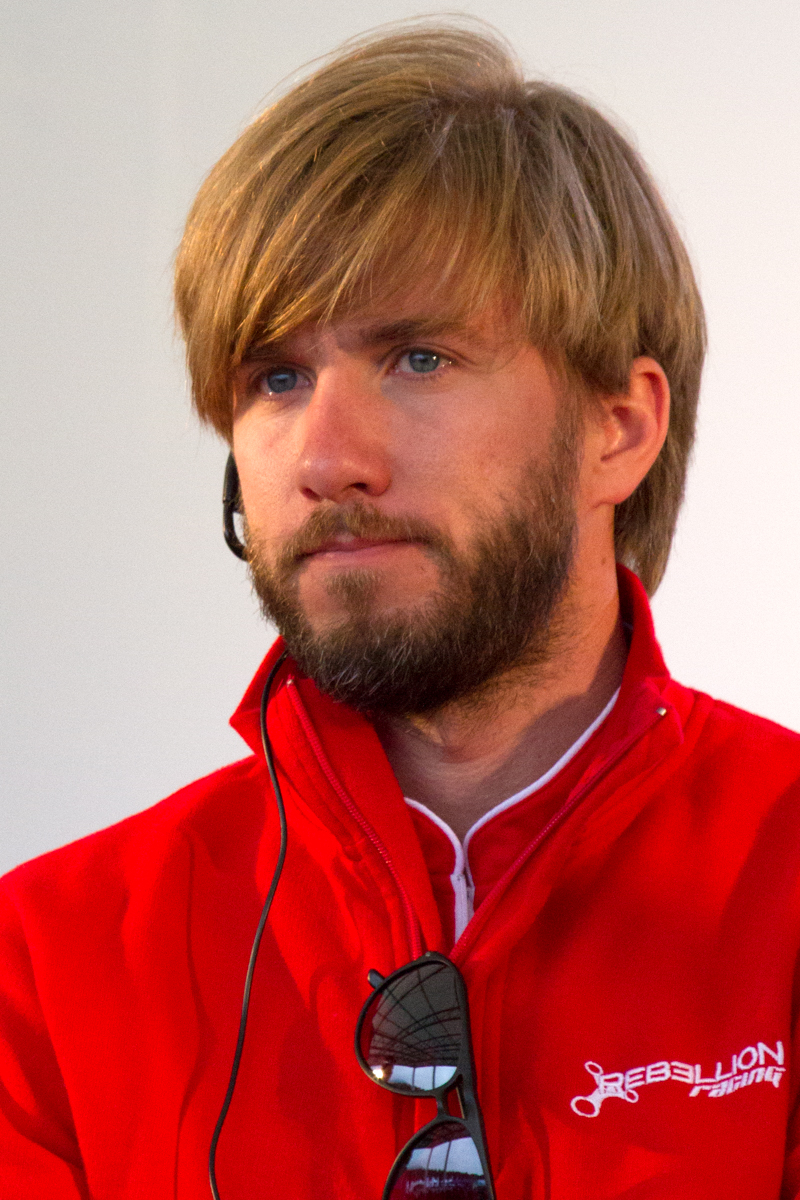
Nick Heidfeld (pictured in 2014) damaged his car's suspension in the first free practice session

Michael Schumacher set the first practice session's fastest lap, a 1:21.304, almost a tenth of a second faster than teammate Rubens Barrichello. Coulthard was third, ahead of Häkkinen. Jaguar's Eddie Irvine was fifth fastest, ahead of his teammate Johnny Herbert. Arrows' Jos Verstappen, Fisichella, Villeneuve and Minardi's Marc Gené were seventh through tenth. Heidfeld damaged his car's left front suspension in a crash early in the session, and Zonta twice lost control of his vehicle by pushing hard. Coulthard set the day's fastest time in the second practice session, lapping at 1:20.602 with 20 minutes remaining. Michael Schumacher and Barrichello were second and third, with Herbert lapping quicker in fourth. Häkkinen, fifth, reported inclement handling and excess understeer entering turns. Jordan's Jarno Trulli, Mika Salo of Sauber, Irvine, Fisichella and Villeneuve followed in the top ten.

During Saturday morning practice, the weather became more breezy, cooler and cloudy. Most teams fine-tuned their vehicles' aerodynamics and used new and worn tyres at both the front and rear. Due to oil pressure issues, Ralf Schumacher had a new engine installed in his car, and extra downforce was added to his car, which had been considerably modified. Häkkinen led the third practice session with a lap of 1:19.115. Barrichello was second, 0.089 seconds slower than Häkkinen. Michael Schumacher was third fastest, ahead of Ralf Schumacher, Villeneuve, Jordan's Heinz-Harald Frentzen, Fisichella, Verstappen and Herbert in places four to ten. Coulthard did not set a lap time during practice because his engine was changed owing to a malfunctioning electrical system.

Most participants lapped faster in the last practice session. Coulthard enjoyed a trouble-free practice and was fastest just under halfway through with a time of 1:18.654, which was less than half a second slower than the circuit record lap set during qualifying for the 1998 race. Michael Schumacher and Barrichello maintained their pace from Friday, going second and third. Häkkinen was fourth and could not go faster when he passed an area with waved yellow flags. Trulli was fifth, ahead of Ralf Schumacher, who drove faster following set-up alterations. Villeneuve, Frentzen, Salo and Fisichella were seventh to tenth. Some drivers lost control of their cars during the session. Heidfeld's engine failed halfway through practice and dropped oil on the circuit, catching out Benetton's Alexander Wurz. His Prost teammate Jean Alesi stopped on the grass when his car ran out of fuel. Pedro Diniz's mounted a kerb and damaged his Sauber car's chassis and undertray; he qualified in the spare C19 car.

== Qualifying ==
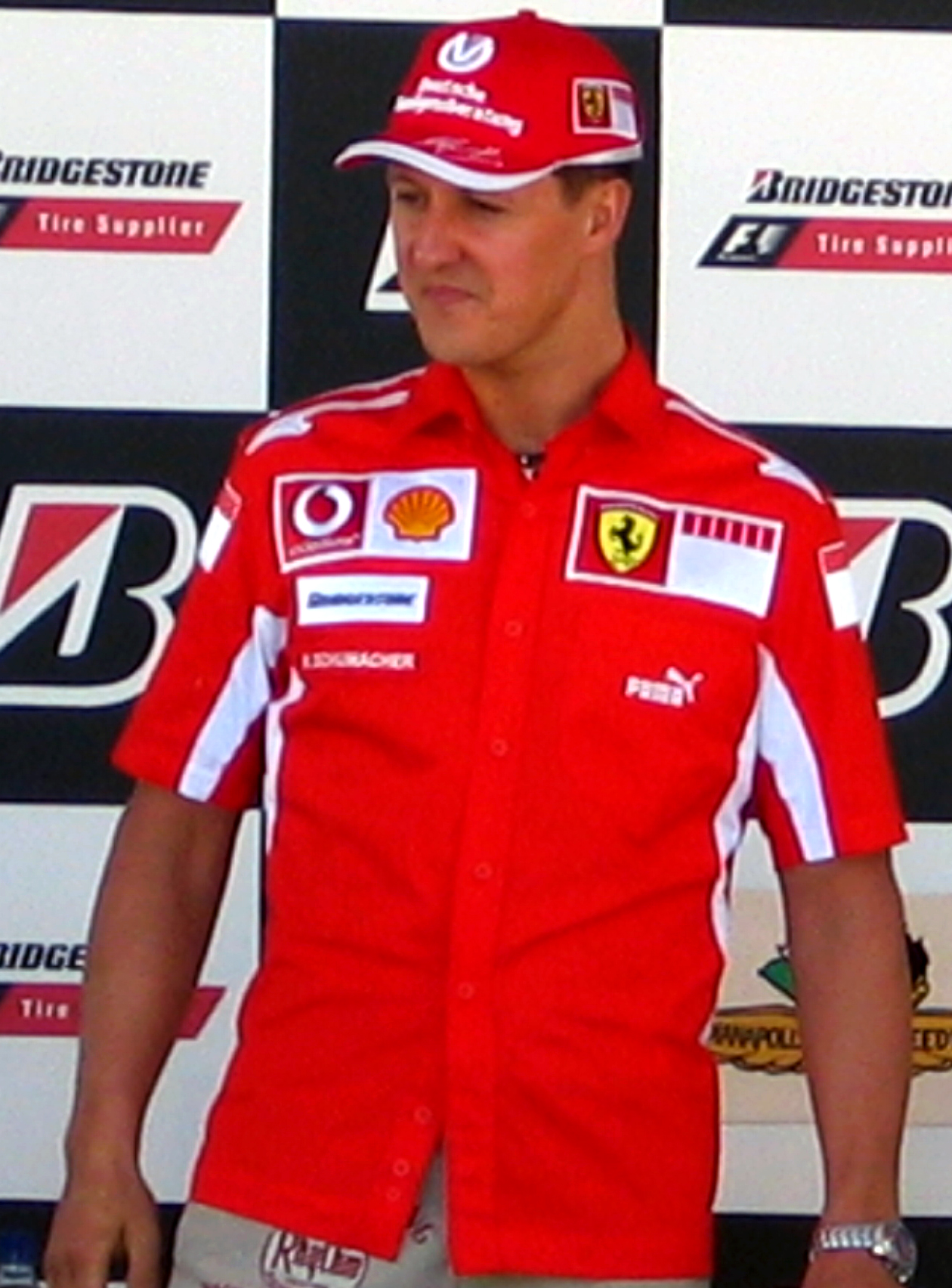
Michael Schumacher (pictured in 2005) won the race after securing his third pole position of the 2000 season.

Each driver was limited to twelve laps during Saturday's one-hour qualifying session, with the starting order determined by their fastest laps. The 107% rule was in force during this session, which required each driver to set a time within 107% of the fastest lap to qualify for the race. The session was held in dry, sunny and warm weather; winds were observed and there was a diminishing chance of rain. No driver appeared to venture onto the circuit, which was dustier and slicker than in practice, particularly at turns eight and nine, as well as the second chicane. Michael Schumacher took his third pole position of the season, and the 26th of his career, with a time of 1:18.439 set on his final lap. Coulthard qualified second, 0.098 seconds slower than Michael Schumacher's lap, having battled the latter for grid position throughout qualifying. Barrichello qualified third after encountering traffic and a stoppage to qualifying. Häkkinen, fourth, encountered traffic during his qualifying runs and ran a defective front wing. Frentzen, fifth, struggled to find his braking point at the L'Epingle hairpin due to heavy winds. Villeneuve was sixth after locking his front tyres at the first chicane during his first quick lap. His teammate Zonta was eighth. Trulli in seventh lacked grip in his tyres. Arrows' Pedro de la Rosa and Fisichella (driving with excess understeer and lack of traction) were ninth and tenth.

Herbert missed qualifying for the top ten by two hundredths of a second, even though he was happy with his car. Despite lacking mechanical grip, Ralf Schumacher set the 12th quickest lap. He was ahead of Verstappen who damaged his front suspension at turn four, (a corner without a run-off area), resulting in a five-minute delay to qualifying after 40 minutes. Drivers entered the pit lane and remained there until marshals cleaned the circuit and put Verstappen's car onto a flatbed truck. The resultant damage meant Verstappen drove his team's spare car. Wurz, 14th in the second Benetton, lost time when he caught the aftermath of Verstappen's collision. Salo, 15th, had his rear wheel lock on downshifts. Irvine's slower Jaguar was behind him. Alesi qualified his Prost car 17th despite an engine failure. He was ahead of Button in 18th after Button's engine cut out at maximum revolutions per minute due to fuel-pick up fault on his final two (his third and fourth) runs. Diniz was 19th. The circuit's slow corners compounded the Williams FW22's poor performance, as it performed better on tracks with faster turns and both Ralf Schumacher and Button experienced car setup issues. Gené took 20th in the faster Minardi and his teammate Gastón Mazzacane completed the starting order in 22nd after facing the possibility of transgressing the 107 per cent rule for most of qualifying. Mazzacane went through the gravel and crashed at the first chicane; he drove the spare Minardi entry and then Gené's race car to qualify. Heidfeld separated the two Minardi drivers in 21st.

=== Qualifying classification ===
Pos	No	Driver	Constructor	Lap	Gap
1	3	(Germany) Michael Schumacher	Ferrari	1:18.439	—
2	2	(United Kingdom) David Coulthard	McLaren-Mercedes	1:18.537	+0.098
3	4	(Brazil) Rubens Barrichello	Ferrari	1:18.801	+0.362
4	1	(Finland) Mika Häkkinen	McLaren-Mercedes	1:18.985	+0.546
5	5	(Germany) Heinz-Harald Frentzen	Jordan-Mugen-Honda	1:19.483	+1.044
6	22	(Canada) Jacques Villeneuve	BAR-Honda	1:19.544	+1.105
7	6	(Italy) Jarno Trulli	Jordan-Mugen-Honda	1:19.581	+1.142
8	23	(Brazil) Ricardo Zonta	BAR-Honda	1:19.742	+1.303
9	18	(Spain) Pedro de la Rosa	Arrows-Supertec	1:19.912	+1.473
10	11	(Italy) Giancarlo Fisichella	Benetton-Playlife	1:19.932	+1.493
11	8	(United Kingdom) Johnny Herbert	Jaguar-Cosworth	1:19.954	+1.515
12	9	(Germany) Ralf Schumacher	Williams-BMW	1:20.073	+1.634
13	19	(Netherlands) Jos Verstappen	Arrows-Supertec	1:20.107	+1.668
14	12	(Austria) Alexander Wurz	Benetton-Playlife	1:20.113	+1.674
15	17	(Finland) Mika Salo	Sauber-Petronas	1:20.445	+2.006
16	7	(United Kingdom) Eddie Irvine	Jaguar-Cosworth	1:20.500	+2.061
17	14	(France) Jean Alesi	Prost-Peugeot	1:20.512	+2.073
18	10	(United Kingdom) Jenson Button	Williams-BMW	1:20.534	+2.095
19	16	(Brazil) Pedro Diniz	Sauber-Petronas	1:20.692	+2.253
20	20	(Spain) Marc Gené	Minardi-Fondmetal	1:21.058	+2.619
21	15	(Germany) Nick Heidfeld	Prost-Peugeot	1:21.680	+3.241
22	21	(Argentina) Gastón Mazzacane	Minardi-Fondmetal	1:22.091	+3.652
107% time: 1:23.930

== Warm-up ==
The drivers took to the track in cloudy, windy weather below 15 °C (59 °F) at 09:30 Eastern Daylight Time (UTC-4) for a 30-minute warm-up session, reporting car issues to their teams. Michael Schumacher set the fastest overall lap in his Ferrari at 1:18.932. His teammate Barrichello was second-quickest. The McLaren pair rounded out the top four fastest drivers; Häkkinen in third in front of Coulthard in fourth. Amongst the slower runners, the engine cover was shed from Heidfeld's car on the main straight. Zonta recorded no lap times due to an engine failure on his first lap out of the pit lane and Irvine was observed driving on wet-weather tyres on a dry circuit.

== Race ==
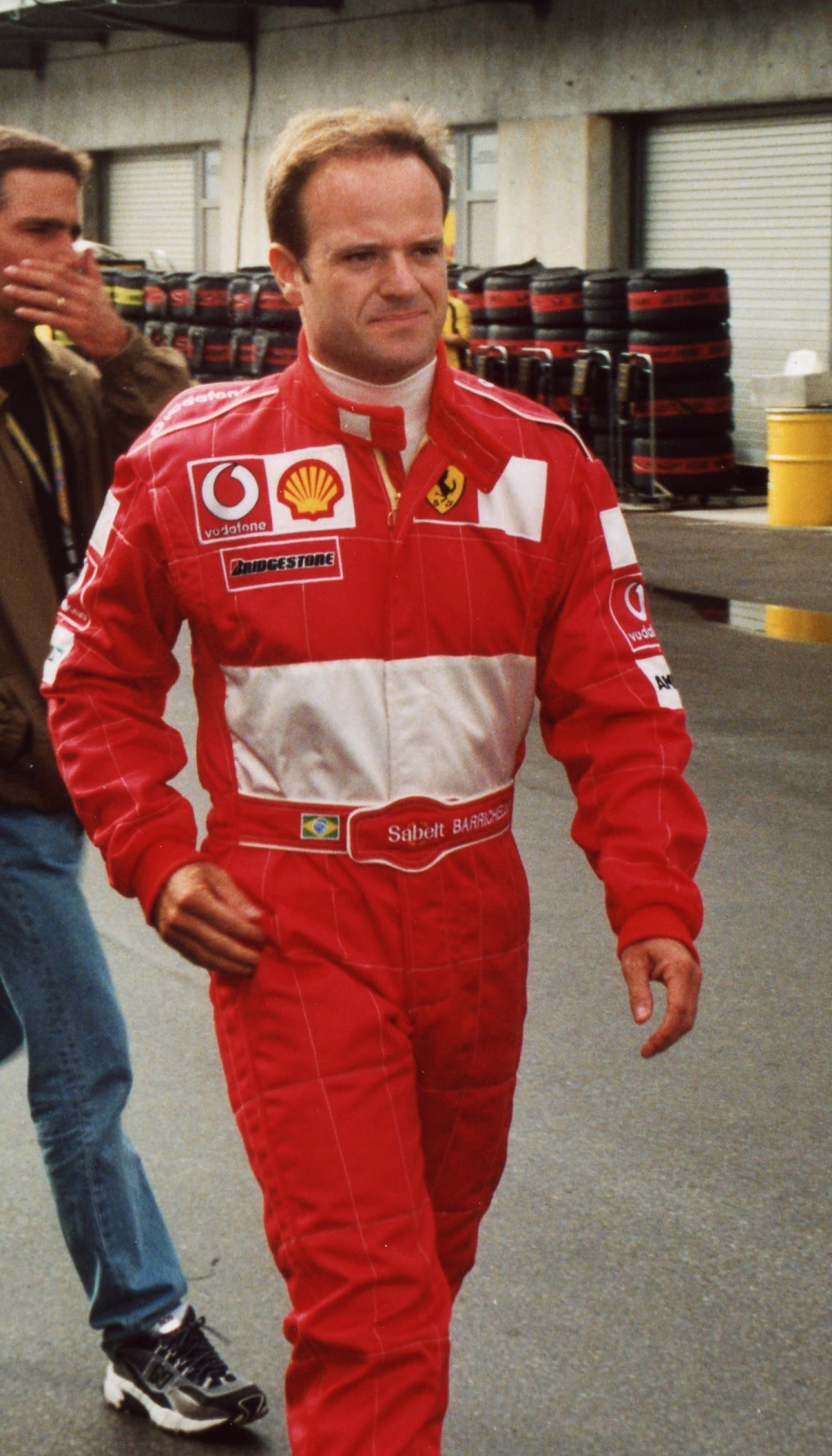
Rubens Barrichello (pictured in 2002) finished in second position.

The race started before 100,000 spectators at 14:00 local time and lasted 69 laps over a distance of 305.049 km (189.549 mi). The pre-race weather was dry and cloudy with the air temperature at 17 °C (63 °F) and the track temperature 21 °C (70 °F); forecasters predicted a 70 per cent chance of rain. As the drivers began the formation lap, Coulthard's McLaren stalled due to a clutch problem and he signalled to his mechanics for assistance. The mechanics restarted Coulthard's car despite being warned not to on the McLaren team radio, a violation of FIA safety regulations. Coulthard took his grid position before the entire field passed him. Coulthard made a better start than Michael Schumacher, but the latter held his position going into the first corner. Meanwhile, Häkkinen resisted Barrichello's initial attempts to pass him for third. During lap one, Villeneuve progressed from sixth to third by passing on the outside, and Verstappen moved from 13th to 10th. Villeneuve's manoeuvre put the early braking Häkkinen wide, letting Barrichello past on the outside for fourth into turn two. A clutch failure farther down the track stranded Irvine on the grid. Marshals pushed him to the pit lane exit.

In contrast to past years, where there was a multi-car accident, no cars were damaged. At the first lap's completion, the first six drivers were Michael Schumacher, Coulthard, Villeneuve, Barrichello, Häkkinen, and Frentzen. Coulthard set a fastest lap of the race, a 1:21.335 on lap two as he closed on Michael Schumacher. De la Rosa took sixth from Frentzen at the hairpin on the same lap. He could not get close to Häkkinen because of his engine's horsepower disadvantage. On lap four, Michael Schumacher began trading fastest laps with Coulthard as Villeneuve held third but was delaying three drivers behind him. Michael Schumacher pulled away from Villeneuve while Barrichello and Häkkinen could not beat Villeneuve's straight-line speed. As Verstappen pressured Fisichella into a braking error, he passed Fisichella for tenth place on the same lap, Button's engine began to cut out at maximum revolutions due to a fuel pick-up issue.

As Michael Schumacher and Coulthard continued their battle up front, the stewards informed the McLaren team on lap ten that Coulthard would serve a ten-second stop-go penalty as his mechanics had worked on his car 15 seconds before the formation lap began. On the 13th lap, Ralf Schumacher overtook Herbert to take 12th position. Coulthard took his penalty on lap 14 and rejoined in tenth position. Herbert entered the pit lane with an gearbox issue on lap 15 and became the race's first retirement. Häkkinen failed to pass Barrichello on the front straight on lap 17. On lap 20, as the skies darkened and rain showers approached, De la Rosa became the first of the two stopping drivers to make a pit stop. He reemerged in 15th position. Michael Schumacher had extended his lead over Villeneuve to 22 seconds by the 22nd lap, while Villeneuve continued to battle for second with Barrichello and Häkkinen. Frentzen trailed the trio ahead of him by 1.9 seconds. Meanwhile, Coulthard was one second slower than the race leader.

Light rain began to fall on lap 23, and the circuit became slippery, slowing Michael Schumacher's lap times by two seconds for two laps. Trulli passed Zonta for sixth place one lap later. Coulthard lost three positions after spinning on oil dropped from Verstappen's car at turn 12. Villeneuve lost second to Barrichello on lap 25 following a short battle and the Brazilian started to gradually close up to Michael Schumacher. As Häkkinen was closing in on Villeneuve, Barrichello began to draw away from the two. Two laps later, Trulli overtook teammate Frentzen for sixth. Both Ferrari drivers were trading fastest laps by lap 29. Meanwhile, Häkkinen began to launch a challenge to overtake Villeneuve for third place. Further down, Zonta passed Frentzen for sixth place. Jordan retired Frentzen at the end of his 33rd lap due to a drop in pressure in the rear wheel braking system, which softened the brake pedal.

Michael Schumacher, concerned with braking issues, stopped early on lap 34. Ferrari inspected his car's rear and adjusted his front wing angle for the changing conditions. Although Michael Schumacher had more fuel to complete extra laps, Ferrari did not feel he was under threat. He rejoined two seconds behind his teammate Barrichello, but a heavy fuel load and a car malfunction slowed him. Schumacher was ahead of Häkkinen, who passed Villeneuve on lap 35 by braking later than Villeneuve into the first turn. Heidfeld went off to the side of the circuit with an engine bay fire after making a pit stop on the 36th lap. Alesi in the other Prost stalled at his pit stop and emerged ahead of Irvine. Trulli became the first front runner to make a scheduled pit stop on lap 39. Alesi retired with a sudden loss of hydraulic pressure on lap 40. Häkkinen, Ralf Schumacher, Barrichello, Zonta, Coulthard, Villeneuve and Fisichella made their pit stops over the next three laps. Salo retired with an engine failure on lap 43. As rain suddenly began to increase in intensity after the pit stop window closed on lap 42, every driver had switched from dry to wet tyres. Häkkinen was the final driver to make such a pit stop on lap 46. Fisichella ran wide and lost second to Barrichello on the 47th lap.

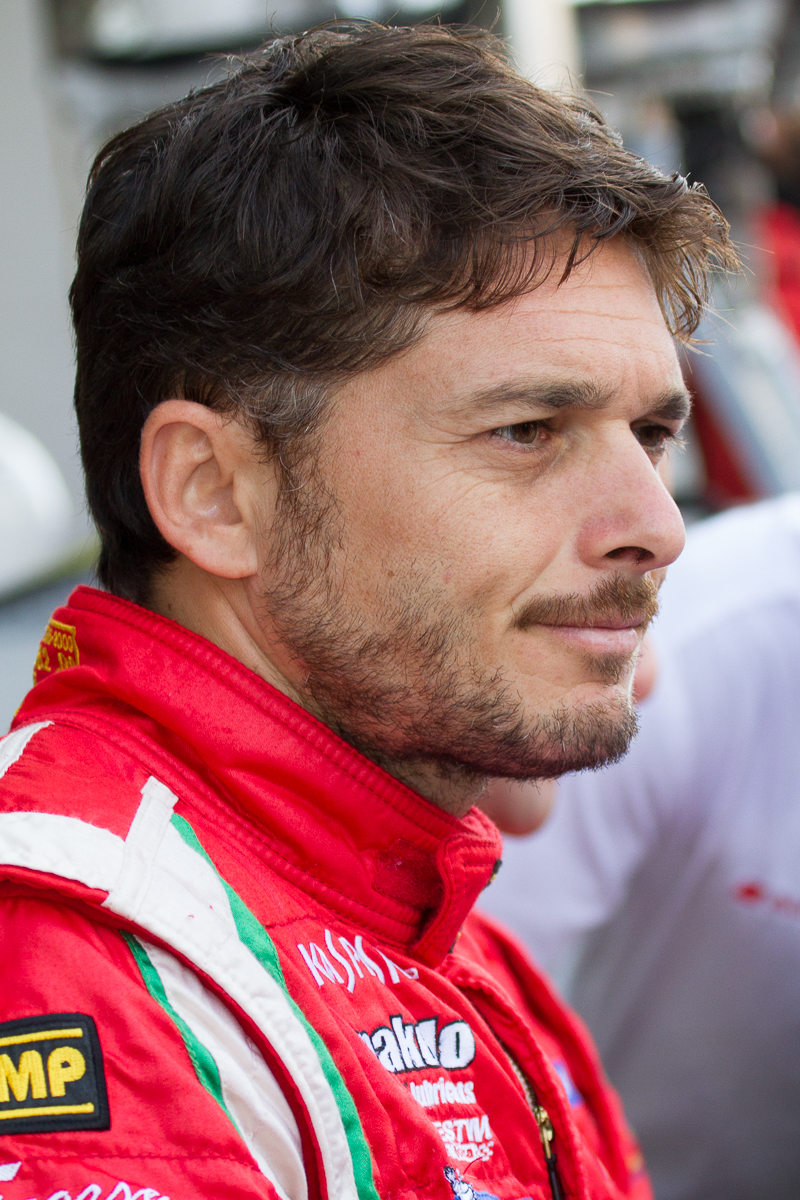
Giancarlo Fisichella (pictured in 2012) took his fourth consecutive podium finish in Canada after finishing third.

At the conclusion of lap 47, with the scheduled pit stops completed, the first six drivers were Michael Schumacher, Barrichello, Fisichella, Häkkinen, Trulli, and Wurz. Michael Schumacher went off the wet track at turn one on lap 48, remaining half a minute ahead of Barrichello. De la Rosa and Diniz were vying for 12th when contact between both drivers saw De la Rosa strike the barrier on the 49th lap. A broken wheel from the accident forced De la Rosa to retire. Verstappen and Wurz went off the track on lap 52 while duelling for sixth place. Verstappen overtook Wurz five laps later. Verstappen passed Trulli for fifth on lap 61. During lap 65, Gené lost control of his car in the middle of a straight while braking and spun onto the grass. His car stalled, causing him to retire. Villeneuve overshot an attempted overtake on Coulthard for eighth into turn 10 on the 64th lap.

On the next lap, the rain began increasing in intensity as Villeneuve performed the same pass although he hit Ralf Schumacher, causing both drivers to retire. Coulthard and Wurz collided at turn one, sending both drivers into the grass on lap 68. Wurz made a pit stop for repairs. Barrichello began to close up to Michael Schumacher in the final laps as Ferrari technical director Ross Brawn instructed him to slow and hold position. Michael Schumacher slowed due to an issue at the rear of his car he had for most of the race; he held off Barrichello to win his fifth race in eight races of the 2000 season and 40th of his career, in 1'41:12.313, at an average speed of 180.049 km/h (111.877 mph). Barrichello finished second 0.174 seconds behind his teammate in a formation finish, with Fisichella securing the final podium in third because his pit stop for wet-weather tyres (following a quick decision not to install dry grooved tyres) came just as the rain fell. Häkkinen finished fourth after passing the pit lane entry just as rainfall arrived. Verstappen was fifth and Trulli completed the points scorers in sixth. Coulthard, Zonta, Wurz, and Diniz filled the next four spots, with Button, Mazzacane, and Irvine finishing at least one lap behind the victor. Despite not finishing the Grand Prix, Ralf Schumacher, Villeneuve, and Gené were the final classified runners.

=== Post-race ===
The top three drivers appeared on the podium to collect their trophies and in the subsequent press conference. Ferrari team member Ignazio Lunetta appeared on the podium to receive the winning manufacturer's award. Michael Schumacher explained that his early pit stop was due to a suspected sensor failure that caused his crew to receive misinformation. He also stated that the wet weather prompted him to shift his car's brake balance to the front. Barrichello stated that he warned Brawn that if it rained for ten more laps, it would be faster to make an extra pit stop. Nonetheless, he stated that he trusted his team's judgement and revealed that his car developed a clutch problem during the race. Fisichella remarked that he was racing conservatively due to his one-stop strategy. He also praised the team for maintaining a continuous run of podium finishes at the circuit.

Häkkinen said that his race was "over" when the rain began falling, having failed to finish higher. Verstappen scored his first points since the 1996 Argentine Grand Prix. Verstappen was pleased with the outcome and thanked his team for moving to wet tyres while staying in communication with his mechanics. Trulli remarked that he had "never had to work so hard for one point" because of the amount of pressure he was under. Coulthard stated that stalling his car cost him the race win and that it was his fault. On the other hand, he criticised his penalty, believing that Formula One's governing body, the FIA, should have allowed race stewards more freedom in determining whether a driver gaining an advantage. David Tremayne of The Independent noted had Coulthard raised his hand before the start, he might have started from the back of the grid.

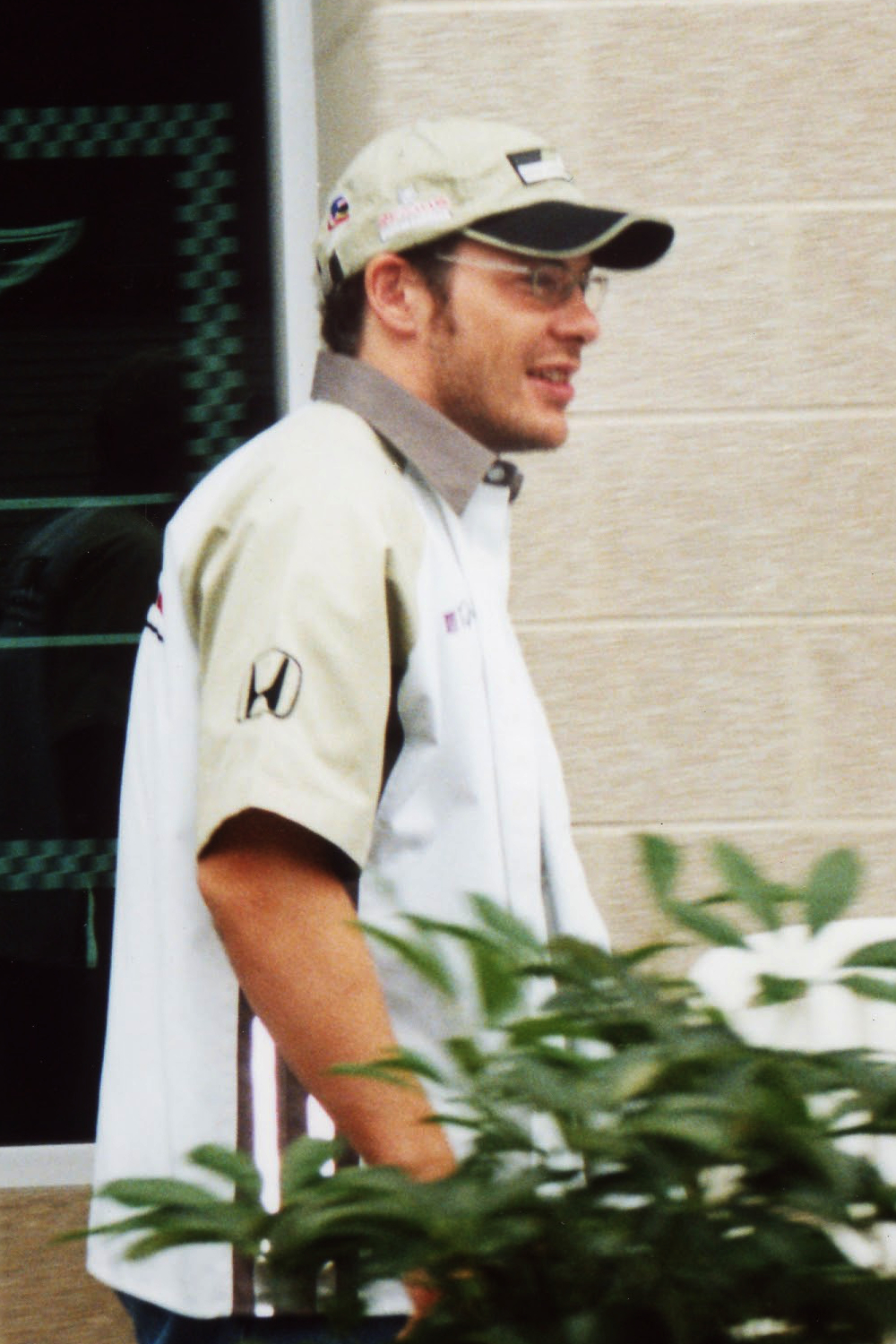
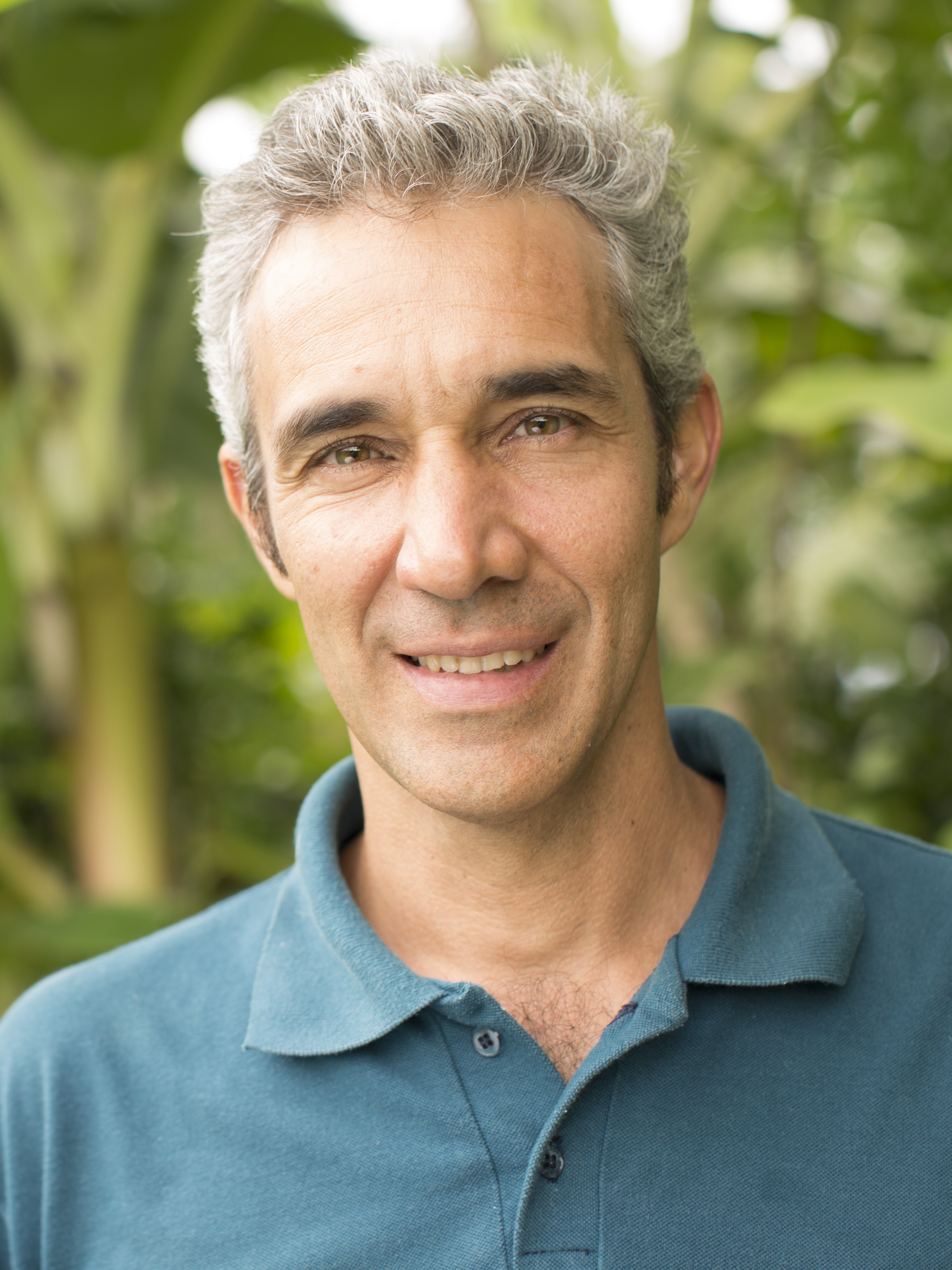
Jacques Villeneuve (left) and Pedro Diniz (right) were each given 25-second time penalties for separate collisions with other drivers during the race.

The stewards penalised Villeneuve and Diniz by adding 25 seconds to their total race times for their crashes with Ralf Schumacher and De la Rosa, respectively, because a decision was not reached prior to the race's last five laps. Villeneuve and Diniz were each reprimanded following a review of video footage and interviews of all the involved drivers. McLaren team principal Ron Dennis was critical of Villeneuve's driving in the event, saying he was driving "in a way that was verging on the kamikaze. He had nothing to lose and was driving in Canada in front of his home crowd and was clearly on a mission." Villeneuve admitted he was fault for causing the accident that saw him collide with Ralf Schumacher and apologised to Schumacher. De la Rosa thought it would better for all to watch footage of his accident with Diniz on television and called Diniz's manoeuvre "very dangerous". Diniz felt that De la Rosa should have been more intelligent by slowing.

The result increased Michael Schumacher's lead in the World Drivers' Championship to 56 championship points, 22 more than second-placed David Coulthard. Häkkinen stayed third, two championship points behind his teammate, while Barrichello, in fourth, closed the gap to Häkkinen to four championship points. Fisichella finishing third kept him in fifth place on 18 championship points. Ferrari's one-two finish extended their lead over McLaren to 18 championship points in the World Constructors' Championship. Benetton overtook Williams for third place, while BAR remained fifth with nine races in the season remaining. Despite Michael Schumacher and Ferrari's increased points lead, Coulthard maintained that his main competitors could be caught in the season's last nine races, saying, "There's still a long way to go in the championship and anything can happen."

=== Race classification ===
Drivers who scored championship points are denoted in bold.

Pos	No	Driver	Constructor	Laps	Time/Retired	Grid	Points
1	3	(Germany) **Michael Schumacher**	**Ferrari**	69	1:41:12.313	1	10
2	4	(Brazil) **Rubens Barrichello**	**Ferrari**	69	+0.174	3	6
3	11	(Italy) **Giancarlo Fisichella**	**Benetton-Playlife**	69	+15.365	10	4
4	1	(Finland) **Mika Häkkinen**	**McLaren-Mercedes**	69	+18.561	4	3
5	19	(Netherlands) **Jos Verstappen**	**Arrows-Supertec**	69	+52.208	13	2
6	6	(Italy) **Jarno Trulli**	**Jordan-Mugen-Honda**	69	+1:01.687	7	1
7	2	(United Kingdom) David Coulthard	McLaren-Mercedes	69	+1:02.216	2	
8	23	(Brazil) Ricardo Zonta	BAR-Honda	69	+1:10.455	8	
9	12	(Austria) Alexander Wurz	Benetton-Playlife	69	+1:19.899	14	
10	16	(Brazil) Pedro Diniz	Sauber-Petronas	69	+1:54.544	19	
11	10	(United Kingdom) Jenson Button	Williams-BMW	68	+1 Lap	18	
12	21	(Argentina) Gastón Mazzacane	Minardi-Fondmetal	68	+1 Lap	22	
13	7	(United Kingdom) Eddie Irvine	Jaguar-Cosworth	66	+3 Laps	16	
14	9	(Germany) Ralf Schumacher	Williams-BMW	64	Collision	12	
15	22	(Canada) Jacques Villeneuve	BAR-Honda	64	Collision	6	
16	20	(Spain) Marc Gené	Minardi-Fondmetal	64	Spun off	20	
Ret	18	(Spain) Pedro de la Rosa	Arrows-Supertec	48	Collision	9	
Ret	17	(Finland) Mika Salo	Sauber-Petronas	42	Electrical	15	
Ret	14	(France) Jean Alesi	Prost-Peugeot	38	Electrical	17	
Ret	15	(Germany) Nick Heidfeld	Prost-Peugeot	34	Engine	21	
Ret	5	(Germany) Heinz-Harald Frentzen	Jordan-Mugen-Honda	32	Brakes	5	
Ret	8	(United Kingdom) Johnny Herbert	Jaguar-Cosworth	14	Gearbox	11	

== Championship standings after the race ==
Drivers' Championship standings

+/–	Pos	Driver	Points
	1	(Germany) Michael Schumacher	56
	2	(United Kingdom) David Coulthard	34
	3	(Finland) Mika Häkkinen	32
	4	(Brazil) Rubens Barrichello	28
	5	(Italy) Giancarlo Fisichella	18

Constructors' Championship standings

+/–	Pos	Constructor	Points
	1	(Italy) Ferrari	84
	2	(United Kingdom) McLaren-Mercedes	66
1	3	(Italy) Benetton-Playlife	18
1	4	(United Kingdom) Williams-BMW	15
	5	(Republic of Ireland) Jordan-Mugen-Honda	10
Sources:

- Note: Only the top five positions are included for both sets of standings.

Previous race: 2000 Monaco Grand Prix	FIA Formula One World Championship; 2000 season	Next race: 2000 French Grand Prix
Previous race: 1999 Canadian Grand Prix	Canadian Grand Prix	Next race: 2001 Canadian Grand Prix
