= Annie Robinson =

RMS Titanic crewmember and survivor (1865–1914)

- Born: Elizabeth Annie Franklin; 27 February 1865; Bedford, Bedfordshire, United Kingdom
- Died: 9 October 1914 (aged 49); North Atlantic Ocean
- Occupation: Ocean liner stewardess
- Spouse: Tom Snell Grierson-Kerswell (m. 1885; separation 1895)
- Children: 2

Elizabeth Annie Grierson-Kerswell (née Franklin; 27 February 1865 – 9 October 1914), better known under the name Annie Robinson, was a British woman who was a stewardess aboard the RMS Titanic during its ill-fated maiden voyage. Robinson was one of only two female members of crew who was called to testify at either inquiry. She died in 1914 after jumping off a ship.

== Early life ==
Robinson was born in Bedford, England, the oldest child of Charles Simeon Franklin and Elizabeth Ann Franklin (née Chew). She had two sisters: Mary and Sarah, and a brother Charles.

On 29 August 1885, Annie married Tom Snell Grierson-Kerswell, an accountant, at the Parish Church in Liverpool. The couple had two daughters, Gladys Anne and Dorothy Albyne. The marriage broke down at some point and Tom emigrated to the United States in 1895, eventually settling in Pennsylvania. At some point, afterwards, she adopted the name "Annie Robinson" and presented herself as a "widow."

== Career at sea ==
Robinson began serving as a stewardess aboard the Port Kingston of the Elder Dempster Line and, more often, with the Canadian Pacific Line fleet. Between 1906 and 1909 she appears regularly in crew lists for the SS Lake Champlain. On 6 May 1909, she was on board the Lake Champlain en route from Liverpool to Montreal carrying 1,000 passengers when it struck an iceberg.

Her last ship before the Titanic was the SS Lake Manitoba.

=== RMS Titanic ===
Robinson signed on to the RMS Titanic on 6 April 1912 as a first class stewardess; she gave her address as 128 Shirley Road, Southampton. Though 47 at the time, she listed her age as being 40. During the voyage, she was tasked with caring for seven ladies, a maid, and a governess.

At the British Inquiry into the sinking, Robinson was called to testify on Day 11. At the inquiry, she stated she saw one of the postal clerks pass by her and return with Chief Purser Hugh McElroy and Captain Edward Smith, and later ship designer Thomas Andrews. She also noticed the ship's carpenter go by looking "bewildered, distracted", which prompted her to head to E-deck to check on the mail room half an hour after the fatal collision with the iceberg. According to her, "I saw two mail-bags and a man's Gladstone bag, and on looking down the staircase I saw water within six steps of coming on to E deck."

After seeing the water, she realized the situation was serious and subsequently escorted the women she was looking after to the boat deck. As she was doing so, she ran into Andrews who, according to her, told her to "put your lifebelt on and walk about and let the passengers see you." After telling him the lifebelt "looks rather mean," Andrews told her, "No, put it on, if you value your life put your belt on."

== Later life and suicide ==
Along with the rest of the survivors of the disaster, Robinson was rescued on the RMS Carpathia and taken to New York City where she boarded the SS Lapland and returned to England, along with all the surviving stewardesses. She was subsequently called by the British inquiry to testify on the disaster.

In July 1913, while on the tender Galatea, she was introduced to King George V and Queen Mary who were touring Liverpool at the time. The King was immediately interested after being told that she was a survivor of the Titanic disaster, and asked the stewardess questions about it. However, Robinson was noted to have been reluctant to talk about her experience, reportedly telling the King, "It is the sort of thing one doesn't like to talk much about afterward. It was too terrible."

=== Death ===
On 9 October 1914, Robinson was aboard the SS Devonian, travelling to Boston to visit her daughter Gladys. As the ship travelled through thick fog Robinson reportedly became very anxious. At some point at night, she likely jumped from the deck. Newspaper reports of her disappearance stated:

Friday night when the Devonian slowed down in a heavy fog Mrs. Robinson apparently became nervous, and the continual sounding of the whistle so worked upon her nerves that she feared another disaster. She was last seen when she left the main saloon about 10:30 Friday night. The suicide was not discovered until yesterday morning when she failed to appear at breakfast.

It is not recorded if her body was found but the entry in the register of deaths at sea states that she was "presumed drowned" between 42º35N 67º15W and 42º25N 69º30W. It is likely that Robinson, after her ordeal with Titanic, was suffering from post-traumatic stress disorder.

After lookout Reginald Lee, Robinson was the second surviving crew member of the Titanic and the first female crew member to die.
