= SS Lake Champlain (1900) =

British passenger ship (1900–1949)

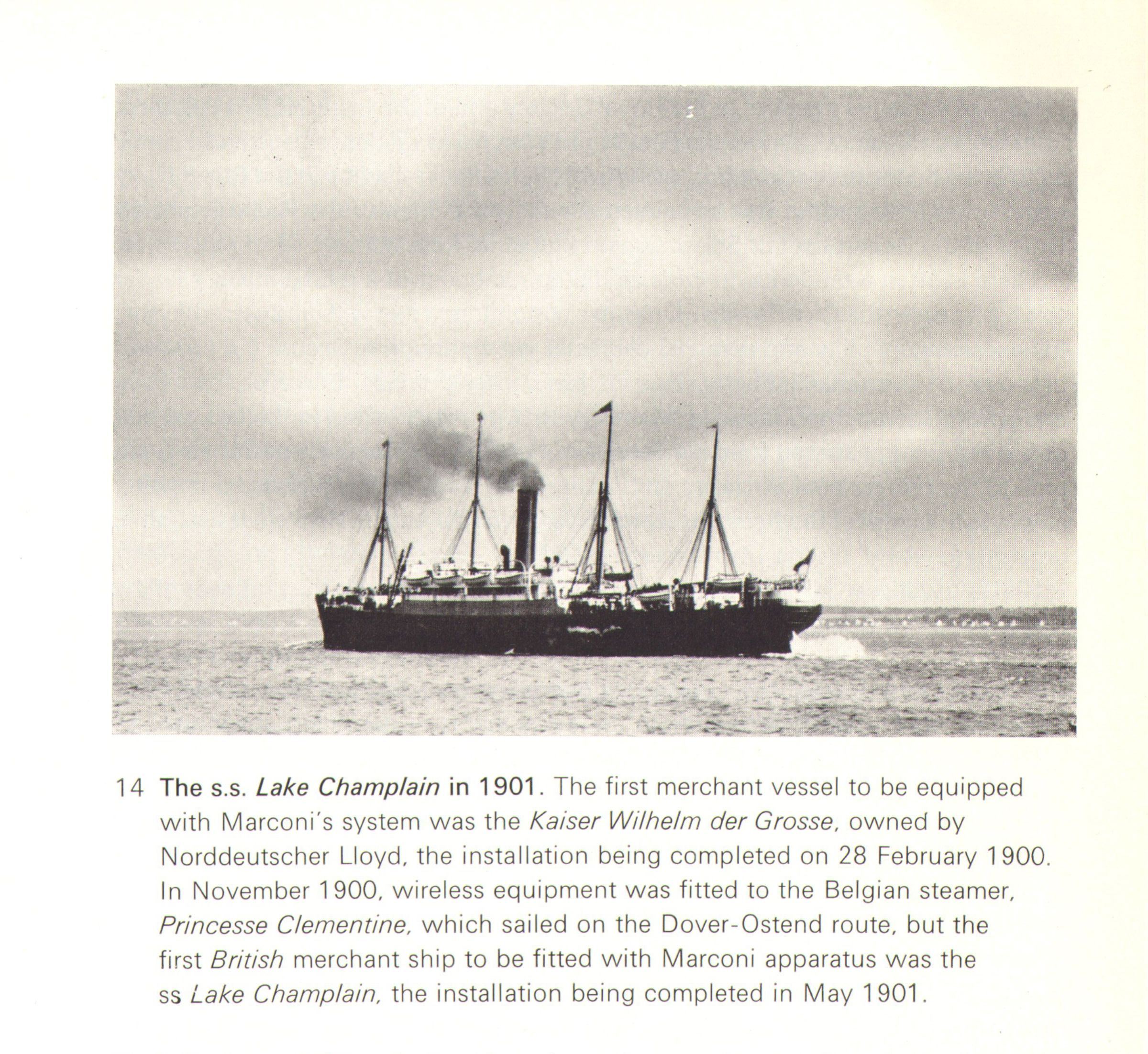
- SS Lake Champlain in 1901.

History

United Kingdom
- Name: (United Kingdom) (1900–1913) Lake Champlain; (United Kingdom) (1913–1914) Ruthenia; (United Kingdom) (1914) Regina; (United Kingdom) (1914–1915) HMS King George V; (United Kingdom) (1915–1942) Ruthenia; (Empire of Japan) (1943–1945) Choran Maru; (United Kingdom) (1945–1949) Ruthenia
- Namesake: Lake Champlain
- Owner: (1900–1903) Elder Dempster Lines Ltd. - African Steamship Co.; (1903–1914) Canadian Pacific Line; (1914–1916) British Expeditionary Force; (1916–1918) Royal Fleet Auxiliary; (1918–1942) British Admiralty; (1942–1945) Imperial Japanese Navy; (1945–1949) British Admiralty - Royal Navy
- Port of registry: United Kingdom, Liverpool
- Route: (1900–1913) United Kingdom – Canada; (1913–1914) Italy – United Kingdom – Canada
- Builder: Barclay Curle & Co. Ltd., Glasgow
- Yard number: 422
- Laid down: 1900
- Launched: 31 March 1900
- Completed: May 1900
- Acquired: May 1900
- Maiden voyage: 15 May 1900
- In service: 15 May 1900
- Out of service: 18 June 1949
- Identification: Official number: 110650
- Fate: Scrapped on 18 June 1949

General characteristics
- Type: Passenger ship
- Tonnage: 7,392 GRT
- Length: 135.9 m (445 ft 10 in)
- Beam: 15.8 m (51 ft 10 in)
- Depth: 8.4 m (27 ft 7 in)
- Decks: 2 decks and a shelter deck
- Installed power: Two triple expansion steam engine
- Propulsion: 2 screw propellers
- Speed: 12.5 knots (23.2 km/h; 14.4 mph)
- Capacity: (1900–1906) 680 passengers (100 first class, 80 second class and 500 steerage); (1906–1914) 1,300 passengers (150 first class, 150 second class and 1,000 steerage)
- Notes: 4 masts and 1 funnel

SS Lake Champlain was a British passenger ship that is best known for being the first British merchant ship to be equipped with Marconi radio apparatus in May 1901. The ship also saw action in both world wars before being scrapped in 1949.

== Construction ==
Lake Champlain was launched at the Barclay Curle & Co. Ltd. Clydeholm shipyard in Glasgow, England on 31 March 1900, and completed in May of that same year. The ship was 135.9 metres (445 ft 10 in) long, had a beam of 15.8 metres (51 ft 10 in) and a depth of 8.4 metres (27 ft 7 in). She was assessed at 7,392 gross register tons (GRT) and had two triple expansion steam engine producing 660 nhp, driving two screw propellers. The ship could reach a maximum speed of 12.5 knots (23.2 km/h; 14.4 mph) and possessed four masts and one funnel. As built, she had the capacity to carry 100 first class passengers, 80 second class passengers and 500 steerage passengers.

== Early career ==
Lake Champlain was built for the Elder Dempster Line and was assigned to sail the United Kingdom – Canada route. She conducted her sea trial successfully on 4 May 1900 and departed on her maiden voyage on 15 May 1900 from Liverpool to Quebec and Montreal without incident.

One year into her service on 23 May 1901, Lake Champlain was fitted with a Marconi radio apparatus, thereby becoming the first British merchant ship and the first ship on the North Atlantic to be fitted with wireless telegraphy. In order to facilitate the new marconi device, a special cabin was built at the cost of five pounds which measured 1.37 metres (4 ft 6 in) by 1.06 metres (3 ft 6 in) and was constructed of matchboard, no windows were installed in the cabin, meaning that the doorway was the only source of natural light for Wireless Operator F. S. Stacey. The marconi radio was placed on a table that was covered with green baize, with the accumulators placed on the floor and the lamp resistance for charging the cells screwed onto the wall. The wireless cabin was also equipped with two induction coils, with one serving as a spare. Both coil boxes were placed on top of each other in order to serve as a seat for Wireless Operator Stacey. Lake Champlain departed Liverpool, bound once again for Canada on the same day as she was fitted with her Marconi set, becoming the first British vessel to sail the North Atlantic while sporting a Marconi apparatus. The ship would go on to carry out a series of radio communications experiments during her voyage, including an exchange of messages between the new radio stations at Holyhead and Rosslare from up to 37 miles out at sea, and there was another successful exchange of messages with the Cunard liner Lucania on her return voyage from Canada. More experiments were conducted during the ship's voyages between 1901 and 1903.

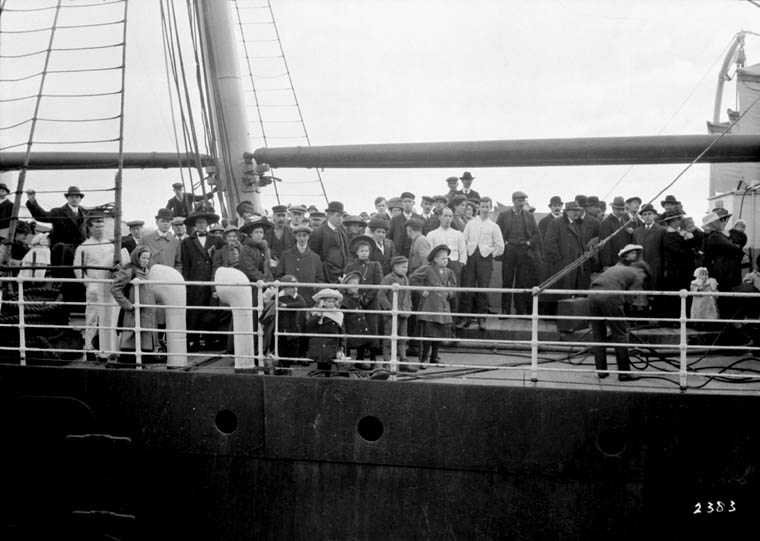
SS Lake Champlain arriving at Quebec in October 1911.

Lake Champlain served as a troop transport ship for the British Army during the Second Boer War in 1902 before returning to civilian service. On 6 April 1903, Lake Champlain was sold to the Canadian Pacific Line and continued on her United Kingdom – Canada route, departing Liverpool for the first time under her new owner on 14 April 1903. It was also under her new owner in 1906, that her accommodation was modified in order to carry 1,300 passengers instead of 680, with space for 150 first class, 150 second class and 1,000 steerage passengers.

Lake Champlain damaged her bow following a collision with a submerged iceberg around dinnertime on 7 May 1909 at 46°40′N 52°55′W near the Grand Banks while she was sailing from Liverpool to Montreal. The damage however was minor enough as to not put the ship in any danger of sinking and all worried passengers that had raced up to the decks by the force of the collision were reassured by the crew that the vessel was safe and to return to their dinners. The small leak that was present by a small puncture in the forward compartment of the bow by the iceberg was easily contained by the ship's pumps and watertight doors. Lake Champlain made her way to St. John's for repairs without further issues, arriving on 8 May 1909. Onboard Lake Champlain during her iceberg encounter, was stewardess Annie Robinson, who would go on to survive the RMS Titanic disaster after the ship struck an iceberg and sank on 15 April 1912 with great loss of life.

Lake Champlain would however be damaged following an iceberg encounter again in April 1911, and again received minor damage after which she made her way to St. John's for repairs without further issues. Another person connected to Lake Champlain who would go on to survive an infamous disaster, was Henry George Kendall, best known for being the captain of the Canadian Pacific Line steamer RMS Empress of Ireland, which sank following a collision with SS Storstad on 29 May 1914 resulting in a great loss of life. Captain Kendall was the commanding officer of Lake Champlain from 25 April 1912 to 17 April 1914. Just before he was put in command of Empress of Ireland. On 7 March 1913, Lake Champlain was renamed Ruthenia and sailed a new Trieste to St. John route, beginning on 20 March 1913. This new route was implemented following a negotiated agreement between the Canadian Pacific Line and the Austrian State Railways for a passenger and cargo service from Trieste to St. John.

== World War I ==
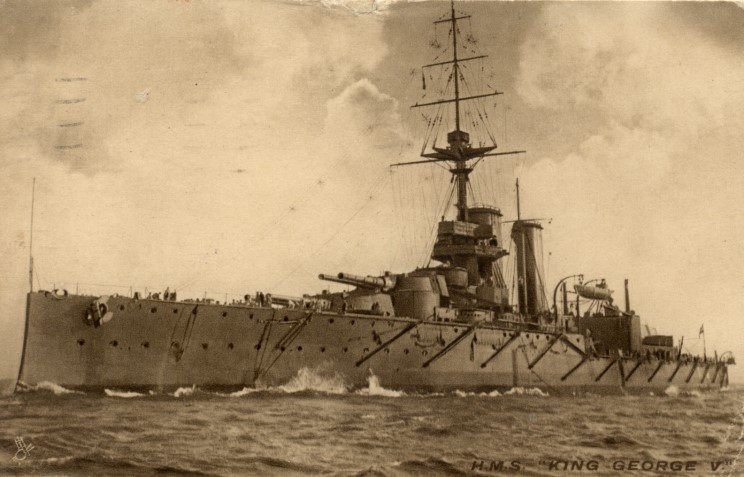
The real HMS King George V in 1913.

Ruthenia conducted her last voyage as a passenger ship in August 1914, sailing from London to Quebec and Montreal, before being commissioned by the British Expeditionary Force to be used as a Canadian troop transport ship at the outbreak of the First World War until October 1914, the ship was briefly renamed Regina during this time. Ruthenia was taken to Belfast in November 1914 and was one of fourteen merchant ships to be converted into a dummy battleship as part of a special squadron. Ruthenia became a dummy of HMS King George V and was given the same name as the battleship. Upon completion, she was stationed at Loch Etive before being transferred to Scapa Flow. The former Ruthenia was bought outright by the Admiralty on 29 January 1915 and was stripped of her camouflage on 6 July 1915 in order to be transformed into a store ship before she was renamed Ruthenia. In 1916, Ruthenia was reverted to Royal Fleet Auxiliary service, first to be used as a storeship before being converted into a water carrier. By 1918, Ruthenia was installed with cylindrical tanks which could carry 5,000 tons of oil so the ship could be used as a naval oiler.

== Interbellum ==
In 1919 Ruthenia set sail for China, where she would continue to be used as an oiler, spending the winters at Hong Kong and the summers at Wei-Hai-Wei until 1927. That year, Ruthenia was laid up in Singapore with worn out boilers and was converted for service as an oil fuel jetty and pumping station at the Woodlands Naval Tank Storage facility near the Johore Causeway.

== World War II ==
During the Battle of Singapore in February 1942, it became clear that the city would fall into the hands of the Imperial Japanese Army, thus Ruthenia was scuttled by British forces on 16 February 1942. The Japanese managed to salvage the ship and she reached the Seletar Naval Base by 1943. On 3 March 1943, Ruthenia had her oil tanks removed and by 10 June 1943 primitive accommodations had been installed. Following her conversion, Ruthenia was registered as a troopship and a specially installed oil transport ship, and renamed to Choran Maru. She remained in Japanese hands and completed numerous sailings between Sumatra and Singapore until she was recaptured by the Royal Navy in September 1945.

== Final years ==
After returning to Royal Navy service and being renamed Ruthenia, the ship was used for the repatriation of Japanese prisoners of war (POWs). During one such run on 30 October 1946, Ruthenia ran aground in the Musi River and remained stuck until three tugs, an Indonesian dredger and much heavy ground tackle were able to pull her off the shore and refloat her on 12 November 1946. Following repairs, Ruthenia continued to repatriate POWs from May to August 1947, after which she served in Vladivostok until 12 March 1949. She returned to Singapore and was sold to BISCO for scrap, being towed from Singapore by the tug Englishman on 3 April 1949 and arriving at Dalmuir for partial breaking up by W. H. Arnott Young & Co. Ltd. on 18 June 1949. On 12 July 1949 Ruthenia was towed to Troon for final demolition by the West of Scotland Shipbreaking Company. The demolition commenced on 24 July 1949 and her hulk was beached on 25 October 1949 before her demolition was completed on 7 June 1950.
