= John Leonard (judge) =

English barrister and judge (1926–2002)

Sir John Leonard

Justice of the High Court
- In office 1981–1993

Common Serjeant of London
- In office 1979–1981

Personal details
- Born: Hamilton John Leonard

Sir Hamilton John Leonard (28 April 1926 – 10 August 2002) was an English barrister and High Court judge. Described as "one of the great criminal specialists of his generation". He was involved in several prominent criminal cases, but is best known for his sentencing in the Ealing vicarage case, for which he was widely criticised for giving two rapists what were perceived as lenient sentences.

== Early life and education ==
Leonard was born in 1926 in either Poole, Dorset, or Swindon, Wiltshire. His father owned a confectionery factory. He was educated at Dean Close School, Cheltenham. He joined the Coldstream Guards on leaving school in 1944, and served in Germany during World War II. After the war, he remained in Germany where he was involved in courts-martial. He left the Army in 1947, having attained the rank of captain. He then received a bachelor's degree in law from Brasenose College, Oxford.

== Legal career ==
Leonard was called to the bar in 1951. He entered the chambers of John Buzzard and specialised in criminal cases. He generally though not invariably appeared for the prosecution. In 1964, he became the Old Bailey second junior prosecuting counsel, and took silk in 1969. His Telegraph obituary describes him as a "shrewd prosecutor and deadly cross-examiner", adding that his style was "fair and understated, precise rather than flamboyant." As a barrister, he was involved in the prosecutions of Emil Savundra for fraud, of the Kray twins for the murders of Frank Mitchell and Jack “The Hat” McVitie, of Graham Young for poisoning several colleagues with thallium, and of George Ince and others for the so-called "Barn Murder" of Muriel Patience. He also repeatedly defended Patrick Armstrong, one of the Guildford Four, whose conviction for the Woolwich and Guildford pub bombings was eventually overturned.

He was appointed successively deputy chair of the Surrey quarter sessions (1969–71), recorder (1972–78), circuit judge (1978) and Common Serjeant of London (1979). In 1981, he became a High Court judge assigned to the Queen's Bench Division. He frequently sat in the Criminal Division of the Court of Appeal. His Telegraph obituary said that he showed "all the hallmarks of a good judge: humanity, understanding, patience, tolerance – and firmness when needed. A master of language, his judgments were elegantly phrased and word-perfect, even though they tended to be delivered ex tempore."

He is best known for presiding at the trial of the Ealing vicarage case in 1987, a burglary in which two of the criminals raped Jill Saward at knifepoint; her father and another man were also seriously assaulted. Leonard gave Saward's rapists what were perceived to be lenient sentences for rape – especially in comparison with the sentence for aggravated burglary received by the group's ringleader, who had not participated in the rape. His actions were condemned by women's groups and others, with his comment that "the trauma suffered by the victim was not so great" being particularly castigated. The criminologist Anthony Bottoms suggests that Leonard made an "inferential error" based on Saward's "dignified demeanour in court"; he also draws attention to the fact that much of the evidence later available about her long-term medical and psychological problems was not presented in court. James Morton, writing in The Guardian, considered that the "repeated and humiliating criticism ... hurt [Leonard] deeply." In Leonard's speech on his retirement, he apologised to Saward and referred to his conduct in the case as a "blemish – I make no bones about it".

As a High Court judge, Leonard also presided over the initial trial of Kiranjit Ahluwalia for the murder of her husband, a conviction later overturned. He was also one of the judges in the Court of Appeal in the unsuccessful appeal by the M25 Three; their convictions were later overturned. Outside court as a barrister he chaired the Criminal Bar Association, advised the Home Secretary on restricted patients (1973–79), and served on the Judicial Studies Board, as well as on a committee that reviewed the obscenity and censorship laws.

== Personal life ==
He met his wife Doreen (Dinkie) Parker in Germany during the war; she was in the Auxiliary Territorial Service. They married in 1948, and the couple had a son and a daughter. They lived at Merstham in Surrey. He retired in November 1993, after experiencing problems with his eyesight. His wife died in 1996, after an accident in Cyprus. Leonard died in 2002.
