= Champlain Bridge =

Champlain Bridge may refer to:

- Champlain Bridge (Montreal, 1962–2019), a bridge in Montreal, Quebec, Canada
- Champlain Bridge (Montreal, 2019–present), a replacement bridge in Montreal, Quebec, Canada
- Champlain Bridge (Ottawa), a bridge in Canada connecting Ottawa, Ontario and Gatineau, Quebec
- Lake Champlain Bridge (1929–2009), a bridge connecting Vermont and New York, US
- Lake Champlain Bridge (2011–present), a replacement bridge between Vermont and New York, US

== See also ==
- Champlain (disambiguation)
