= Jill Saward =

English campaigner and author

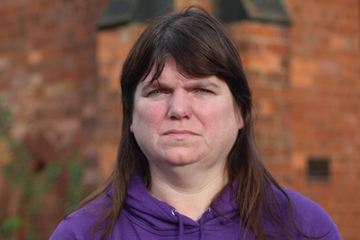
- Born: 14 January 1965; Liverpool, England
- Died: 5 January 2017 (aged 51); Wolverhampton, England
- Occupations: Campaigner, author, political candidate
- Known for: Rape survivor and campaigner
- Political party: Independent
- Spouses: Gary Huxley (m. 1988–1992) Gavin Drake (m. 1993)
- Parent: Michael Saward
- Relatives: Joe Saward (brother); Henry George Kendall (great grandfather)
- Website: www.saward.org

Jill Saward (14 January 1965 – 5 January 2017), also known by her married name Jill Drake, was an English campaigner on issues relating to sexual violence.

She was the victim of a violent robbery and rape in 1986 at a vicarage in Ealing, London, a crime for which the perpetrators' relatively lenient sentences led indirectly to changes in the law. Saward was the first rape victim in Britain to waive her right to anonymity.

== Background ==
Saward was educated at Lady Margaret School in London. Her father, Reverend Michael Saward, became the vicar of St Mary's, Ealing, in 1978. She married Gavin Drake, and the couple lived in Hednesford, Staffordshire, with their three sons. Saward was the sister of motor racing journalist Joe Saward.

== Ealing vicarage rape ==
=== Attack ===
On 6 March 1986, a gang of burglars broke into the Saward family's home at lunchtime. Jill's father and her then-boyfriend, David Kerr, were tied up and beaten, both suffering fractured skulls, while she was raped.

The incident received considerable international media coverage because the house was identified as that of the vicar of Ealing, and the attack was soon labelled by the media as the "Ealing vicarage rape". Saward was effectively identified as the victim of the attack by photographs published in The Sun four days later.

=== Trial and sentences ===
At the trial of the perpetrators in 1987, the judge, John Leonard, gave those responsible longer sentences for the burglary than for the rape, stating: "Because I have been told the trauma suffered by the victim was not so great, I shall take a lenient course with you". The leader of the three men, Robert Horscroft, who was not involved in the rape, received 14 years' imprisonment for burglary and assault. Martin McCall, the more violent of the two attackers, was sentenced to five years for rape and five years for aggravated burglary, while Christopher Byrne received three years for rape and five years for burglary and assault.

The sentence was criticised by senior British politicians of the time, including then-Prime Minister Margaret Thatcher and opposition leader Neil Kinnock, while others complained that property was being valued more highly than a human body. Saward too complained about the sentences; in 1988, as a result of the case, a new law was passed that allowed appeals against unduly lenient sentences, and also closed a loophole that had previously only granted rape victims anonymity after a suspect was charged with the offence.

Criminologist Anthony Bottoms described the case as "a particularly striking example of some fault lines deeply embedded within the institutional structures of the English sentencing processes" of the time.

On his retirement in 1993, Leonard publicly apologised to Saward, saying his judgment at the trial was a "blemish – I make no bones about it".

=== Subsequent developments ===
Four days after the incident, The Sun published a photograph of Saward with just her eyes blacked out, as well as an image of her home on its front page, jeopardising her anonymity. The newspaper's editor, Kelvin MacKenzie, said he printed the images because a rape victim only earned the right to anonymity once a suspect had been charged with the offence. This led to the Press Council amending its guidelines and the closure of that legal loophole.

In 1990, with the help of friend Wendy Green, Saward wrote a memoir about her experiences, called Rape: My Story (1990). At the same time she featured in an Everyman programme for the BBC with Jenni Murray. In doing so, she became the first British rape victim to waive her right to anonymity. The documentary was used to educate judges about the trauma suffered by rape victims.

In 1998, Saward met Horscroft, who was the leader of the gang but who had not been involved in the rape, and reportedly forgave him for his role in the crime. Horscroft had been freed in 1996; he died in 2012.

Saward told Elizabeth Grice in an interview for The Daily Telegraph in 2006: "Of course, sometimes I thought it might be quite nice to be full of hatred and revenge. But I think it creates a barrier and you're the one who gets damaged in the end. So, although it makes you vulnerable, forgiving is actually a release. I don't think I'd be here today without my Christian faith. That's what got me through".

== Campaigning work ==
In 1988, Saward moved from London to the West Midlands where she initially worked as a teaching assistant at a school in Birmingham. From 1990, until her death, Saward worked in various roles to support victims of rape and sexual violence. In 1994, she set up a support group for rape victims and their families, and also helped to campaign for a change in the law that allowed people accused of rape to cross-examine their alleged victims. In a Channel 5 interview, she argued in 1997 that men in date rape cases should be tried of a lesser offence. "I do [not] suggest the hypothetical victim is culpable," she commented, "only that she did nothing to help herself". Feminists responded negatively.

In 2009, she campaigned against a European Court of Justice ruling that the DNA of people cleared of crimes must be deleted from the DNA Database after six years, or 12 years for serious crimes. In 2015, she spoke out against a proposal for rape suspects to remain anonymous until they are charged, describing it as "really insulting to victims and a really disappointing move" and sending a "damaging message" when it was proposed as part of the coalition agreement for the 2010 Parliament.

In 2014, Saward co-founded the JURIES (Jurors Understanding Rape Is Essential Standard) campaign with Alison Boydell, seeking to make it mandatory for jurors in sexual abuse and rape trials to be informed about "the myths, stereotypes and realities" concerning those issues. Explaining the goal of the campaign, Saward wrote: "We envisage this being done by a DVD that is played in open court that addresses some of the most common myths. Many victims are not getting justice because jurors believe incorrect information that is prejudicial to their thinking, before any evidence is heard. Currently rape myths can be addressed, but only after the evidence is heard. This is too late."

In January 2015, Saward debated the campaign's goals with Helen Reece, lecturer in law at the London School of Economics, on BBC Radio 4's Woman's Hour.

In 2016, Saward criticised the Crown Prosecution Service's dealing with rape cases, saying: "I think the issues a lot of people have is the length of time it takes the CPS to get a case to court."

== Politics ==
Saward stood against David Davis in the 2008 Haltemprice and Howden by-election. She criticised Davis for "saying nothing at all" about sexual violence issues while serving as Shadow Home Secretary, and stated that the DNA Database should be extended to help detection of sexual assault. In her view, there was a disparity between the "thousands" of people affected by sexual assault each year, compared to the detention proposals of the Counter-Terrorism Bill "which may not affect anybody at all" and felt that "somebody needs to get the issue of rape on to the agenda".

On the issue of detaining suspects for up to 42 days, she told Julie Bindel: "If the police say they need more time to work on these cases, then I support them". Asked about the effects on the Asian community: "It will target people who are seen to be a threat to our nation's freedom. At the moment, that might be some Muslim men, 10 years ago it was the IRA – so people with Irish accents were the target – and soon it could be Mugabe's men".

In the by-election Saward received 492 votes (2.1%).

== Death ==
Jill Saward died on 5 January 2017, in New Cross Hospital, Wolverhampton, following a subarachnoid hemorrhage two days earlier.

== Publications ==
- Saward, Jill, with Green, Wendy (1990) Rape: My Story Bloomsbury Publishing; ISBN 9780747507512

== See also ==
- Types of rape
- Effects of rape and aftermath
- Laws about rape
