= Champlain College (disambiguation) =

Champlain College is a private, coeducational college located in Burlington, Vermont, United States.

Champlain College may also refer to:

- Champlain Regional College, an English-language, publicly funded pre‑university college in Quebec, Canada
  - Champlain College Saint-Lambert, Champlain Regional College campus serving the Greater Montreal Area
  - Champlain College Lennoxville, Champlain Regional College campus serving the Eastern Townships
  - Champlain College St. Lawrence, Champlain Regional College campus serving Quebec City
- Champlain College at Trent University in Peterborough, Ontario, Canada

== See also ==
- Champlain (disambiguation)
