= Joe Saward =

British motoring journalist

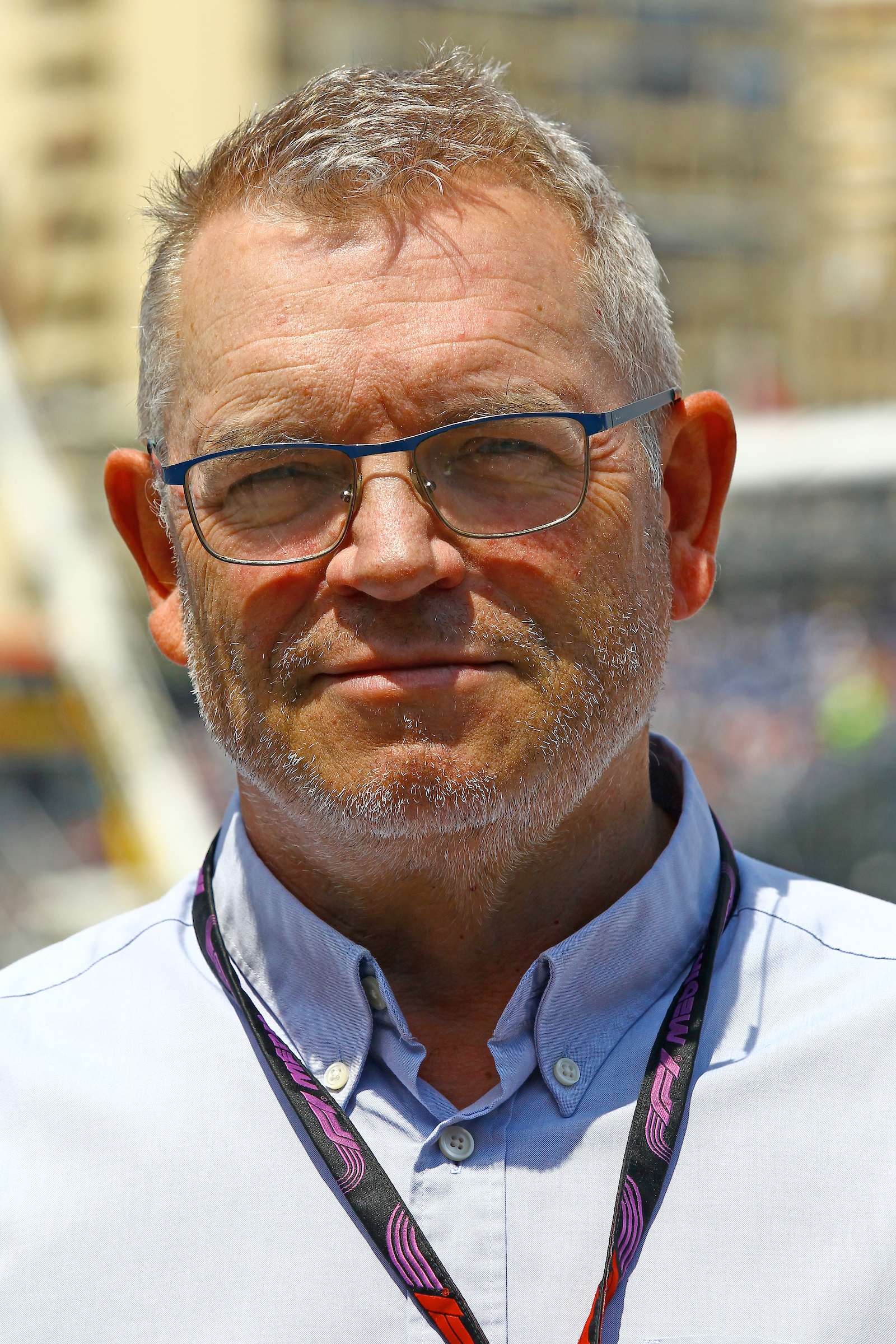
- Saward at the Monaco GP in 2023
- Born: 14 July 1961 (age 64); London, England, UK
- Occupation: Motorsport journalist
- Years active: 1984–present
- Known for: Formula One reporting
- Parent: Michael Saward
- Relatives: Jill Saward (sister); Henry George Kendall (great-grandfather)
- Website: https://www.flatoutpublishing.com/

Jonathan Mark Christopher Saward (born 14 July 1961) is a British Formula One journalist.

== Life and career ==
Saward was educated at Haileybury College and attained a degree in history at Bedford College, University of London. In 1984 he joined Autosport magazine in London. He began reporting on Formula One in 1988, working alongside Nigel Roebuck and remained as Grand Prix Editor of Autosport until 1993. He later wrote for the F1 News magazine, and went on to create the JSBM Newsletter and more recently a Formula One blog, called Joeblogsf1.

This was followed by the launch of GrandPrix+, an e-magazine developed in partnership with David Tremayne. Saward hosts in-person and virtual audiences for Formula One fans who can ask questions about the sport. He also takes part in podcast interviews on Missed Apex podcast. He has the distinction of attending all the F1 races since 1988, is accredited as an FIA Formula One Permanent Passholder, and previously sat on the board of Caterham Cars as a non-executive director.

Saward has also written a number of books, including The World Atlas of Motor Racing. In 2006 he published The Grand Prix Saboteurs, detailing the story of racing drivers who went on to establish a sabotage network in France during World War II. As a result, the Guild of Motoring Writers named Saward the Renault UK Author of the Year. He published a biography of his great-grandfather, Henry George Kendall, titled The Man who Caught Crippen. He has also published four volumes of Fascinating F1 Facts.

Saward is the son of clergyman Canon Michael Saward (died 2015) and the brother of activist Jill Saward (died 2017).

He lives in France.

=== 2024 Online abuse ===
On 26 September 2024, Saward published an edition of his regular Green Notebook feature on his online blog in which he stated there was a paddock rumour circulating that Sergio Pérez would retire after the 2024 Mexico City Grand Prix. Saward's decision to publish the rumour drew the ire of Pérez's supporters online (particularly on the X platform) some of which were purely abusive or contained what he perceived to be death threats. Saward condemned the abuse in a blog post response on 2 October 2024 announcing he would be restricting access to his X posts to approved followers only.

== Sources ==
- Saward, Joe (2023). Joe Saward's Green Notebook. Morienval Press. ISBN 978-0-9554868-7-6.
- Saward, Joe (2023). Fascinating F1 Facts Vol 4. Morienval Press. ISBN 978-0-9554868-6-9.
- Saward, Joe (2023). Fascinating F1 Facts Vol 3. Morienval Press. ISBN 978-0-9554868-5-2.
- Saward, Joe (2018). Fascinating F1 Facts Vol 2. Morienval Press. ISBN 978-0-9554868-4-5.
- Saward, Joe (2018). Fascinating F1 Facts Vol 1. Morienval Press. ISBN 978-0-9554868-3-8.
- Saward, Joe (2010). The Man who Caught Crippen. Morienval Press. ISBN 978-0-9554868-1-4.
- Saward, Joe (2006). The Grand Prix Saboteurs. Morienval Press. ISBN 978-0955486807.
