= Champlain II =

- CHAMPLAIN II Shipwreck
- U.S. National Register of Historic Places
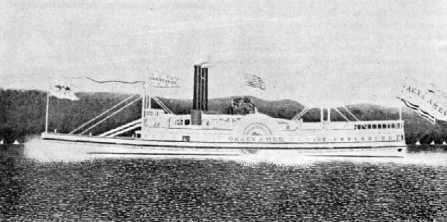
- The Champlain II was built as the Oakes Ames, depicted here in a c. 1868 painting by James Bard

- Location within New York Location within the United States
- Location: Address Restricted, Westport, New York
- Coordinates: 44°12′21″N 73°22′39″W
- Area: 2 acres (0.81 ha)
- Built: 1868
- Architect: Proctor, Napoleon Bonaparte; Spear, Orson Saxton
- Architectural style: Sidewheel Passenger Steamer
- NRHP reference No.: 97000980
- Added to NRHP: September 15, 1997

The steamboat Oakes Ames was built in 1868 by the Napoleon B Proctor Shipyard in Burlington, Vermont, for the Rutland Railroad. The 244-foot paddle wheeler was designed to ferry railroad cars from Burlington across Lake Champlain to Plattsburgh, New York. She was named after one of the railroad's directors' Oakes Ames.

She successfully trialed on 19 August 1868 and her maiden excursion ran the next day to Willsboro Bay, Plattsburg. Mr. Ames went onward to Montreal for a review of the railroad's assets.

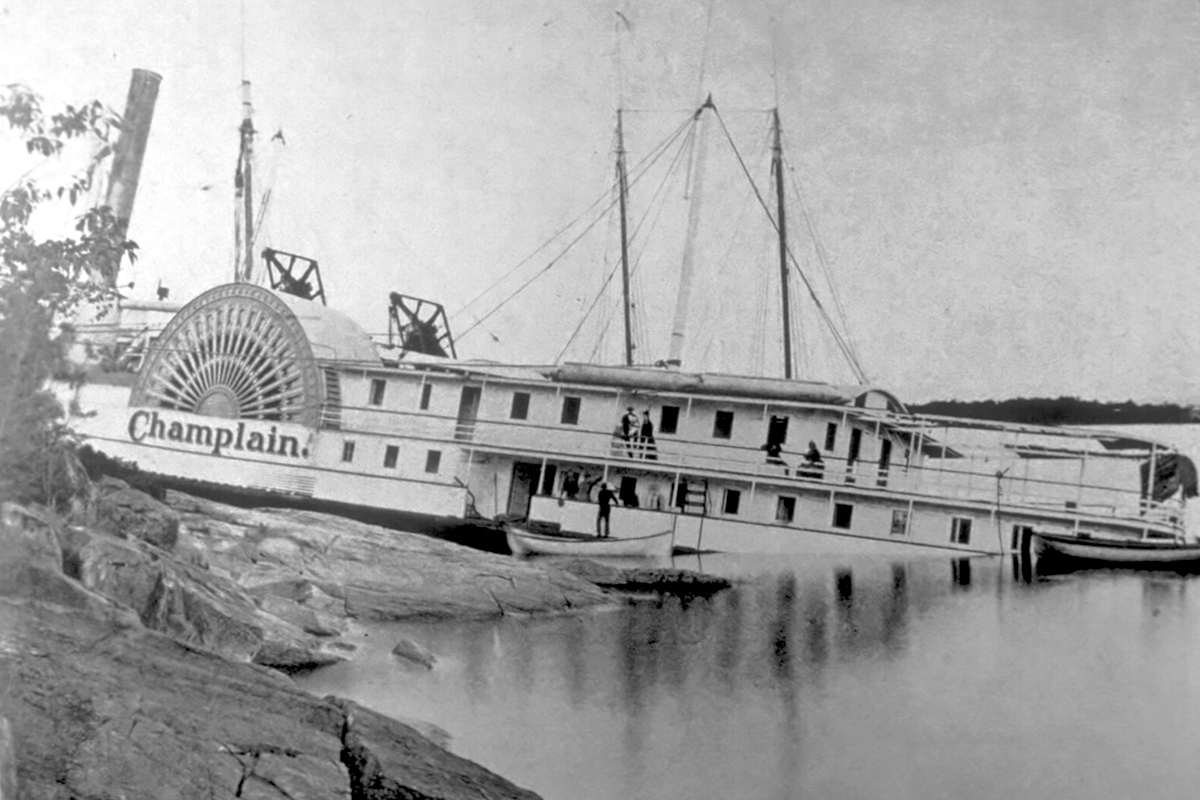
Champlain II aground, 1875

In 1874, the ship was renamed and repurposed for passenger service as the Champlain II. The following year, on July 16, 1875, the ship was wrecked when it ran aground after drifting off course while being guided by a pilot under the influence of morphine. A salvage operation shortly afterwards removed much of the superstructure, leaving about a third of the wreck in place.

The site is now an archaeological site located in Lake Champlain near Westport in Essex County, New York. It was listed on the National Register of Historic Places in 1997.
