= Henry George Kendall =

British sea captain (1874–1965)

Commander Henry George Kendall RNR
- Kendall c. 1914
- Born: 30 January 1874; Chelsea, London, England
- Died: 28 November 1965 (aged 91); Lambeth, London, England
- Occupations: Merchant seaman, Naval officer
- Known for: Assisting in the capture of Hawley Harvey Crippen; Last captain of the RMS Empress of Ireland
- Spouse: Jane Wright Jones (m. 1896; died 1941)
- Children: 3
- Military career
- Allegiance: United Kingdom
- Branch: Royal Naval Reserve
- Rank: Commander
- Conflicts: World War I

Commander Henry George Kendall RNR (30 January 1874 – 28 November 1965) was a British sea captain who survived several shipwrecks, most notably the collision and sinking of the Empress of Ireland in 1914 and an attack by a Kaiserliche Marine submarine during the First World War. He was also noted for his role in the capture of murderer Dr. Hawley Harvey Crippen.

== Life ==
=== Early career ===
Captain Henry Kendall began his career in sailing ships in 1888 at the age of 14. Eight years later he married Jane "Minnie" Jones. In 1900 he survived a shipwreck on the Newfoundland coast when he was an officer on the SS Lusitania (not the later Cunarder RMS Lusitania torpedoed in the First World War). Two years later he worked with Guglielmo Marconi to develop ship-to-shore radio before getting his first command in 1908. Two years after that he was appointed captain of the Canadian Pacific Line's SS Montrose, and within months had become famous following his role in the capture of Dr. Hawley Harvey Crippen, the London cellar murderer, in what was the first use of radio to capture a criminal. Kendall's radio messages alerted Scotland Yard, and Inspector Walter Dew was dispatched to Canada on a faster ship, the White Star Line's SS Laurentic, and arrived in Canada before Montrose. Disguised as a pilot, Dew boarded Montrose and arrested Crippen.

=== RMS Empress of Ireland ===
In May 1914 Kendall was appointed captain of the RMS Empress of Ireland. Almost a month later the ship sank in Canada's Saint Lawrence River after colliding with the SS Storstad, a Norwegian coal freighter with an ice-breaking bow. The accident occurred at night. The two ships were head to head when a fog bank rolled onto the river and Storstad changed position, believing Empress of Ireland to be on Storstad's port side. This turned the freighter into the side of the larger ship, which was passing on the starboard side. The damage was catastrophic and Empress of Ireland sank in just 14 minutes with the loss of 1,012 people. Kendall was thrown from the bridge when the ship keeled over suddenly but survived. Subsequently, he was cleared of any responsibility for the disaster.

=== Action in the First World War ===
Soon afterwards he was posted to Antwerp, Belgium, where he was soon in the news again. As the Germans invaded Belgium, the British Consulate in Antwerp was besieged by around 600 refugees. Kendall worked with the consul Sir Cecil Hertslet (A Family of Librarians -see gov.uk) to formulate a plan to rescue them by using the SS Montrose to tow the SS Montreal, which was out of commission, out of the port and on to England.

Kendall then joined the crew of HMS Calgarian and served with the ship until 1918, during which time he was mentioned in despatches on several occasions. In March 1918 Calgarian was torpedoed off the Ulster coast by German submarine U-19 but Kendall survived again. He went on to serve as a King's Messenger before being appointed Commodore of Convoys. When the war ended he was appointed Marine Superintendent at Southampton by Canadian Pacific and remained there until he moved to a similar position in London in 1924.

== Death ==
He died in an English nursing home in 1965 at the age of 91. His obituary in The Times made no mention of the sinking of the Empress of Ireland. Nurses attending Kendall on his death bed reported that in his delirium he seemed to be reliving the horror of a ship wreck.

== Descendants ==
His grandson was the Anglican priest and hymn writer Canon Michael Saward, and his great-grandchildren include F1 journalist Joe Saward and the late anti-rape campaigner Jill Saward.

== Sources ==
- David Zeni Forgotten Empress: The Empress of Ireland Story, (Bookcraft, Midsomer Norton, Great Britain: Goose Lane Editions, c1998) ISBN 0-86492-248-5.
- James Croall Fourteen Minutes: The Last Voyage of the Empress of Ireland, (Briarcliff Manor, NY: Stein & Day, c1979), 237p., illus. ISBN 0-8128-2591-8.
- Tom Cullen The Mild Murderer: The True Story of the Dr. Crippen Case, (Boston: Houghton Mifflin Co., 1977), 224p., illus. ISBN 0-395-25776-X.
- Jonathan Goodman (Compiler) The Crippen File, (London: Allison & Busby, 1985), 96p. illus. ISBN 0-85031-637-5 Pbk.
- Erik Larson Thunderstruck, (New York: Random House, Inc. – Three River Press, 2006), 463p. illus. ISBN 978-1-400-08067-0.
- Joe Saward "The Man who Caught Crippen" (Morienval Press, 2010), 242p. illus. ISBN 978-0-9554868-1-4.
