= David Tremayne =

British racing journalist

David John Tremayne is a UK-based motor racing journalist. He has written extensively about the Land Speed Record. He was the Formula One correspondent for The Independent. He is one of the founding partners of GrandPrix+, the sport's first e-magazine, with fellow journalist Joe Saward. GrandPrix+ won the 2007 Guild of Motoring Writers Newspress New Media Award.

== Awards ==
He was the 1990, 2001 and 2004 winner of the Guild of Motoring Writers Journalist of the Year Award.

== Publications ==
=== Books (incomplete list) ===
In order of date published

- Tremayne, David (1991). Racers Apart: Memories of motorsport heroes. UK: Motor Racing Publications Ltd. ISBN 0-947981-58-6.
- — (27 November 2000). The Science of Safety: The Battle Against Unacceptable Risks in Motor Racing. UK: Haynes Group. ISBN 1-85960-664-4.
- — (2004). The Science of F1 Race-Car Design.
- — (2005). Donald Campbell: The Man Behind the Mask. Bantam Books. ISBN 0-553-81511-3.
- — (16 June 2005). Rubens Barrichello: In the spirit of Senna and the shadow of Schumacher. UK: Haynes Group. ISBN 1-84425-200-0.
- — (24 August 2006). The Lost Generation: The Tragically Short Lives of 1970s British F1 Drivers Roger Williamson, Tony Brise and Tom Pryce. UK: Haynes Group. ISBN 1-84425-205-1.
- — (23 November 2006). The World's Fastest Diesel: The Inside Story of the JCB Dieselmax Land Speed Record Success. UK: J H Haynes & Co Ltd. ISBN 1-84425-420-8.
- — (2010). Jochen Rindt, Uncrowned King: The superfast life of F1's only posthumous World Champion. Sparkford, Yeovil, Somerset: Haynes Publishing. ISBN 9781844254729.
- — (5 April 2018). Jim Clark: The best of the best. UK: Evro Publishing. ISBN 978-1910505168
- — (2024). Brawn BGP 001/02: The autobiography of Jenson Button’s World Championship winner. Great Cars series, no. 18. Knighton-on-Teme, Tenbury Wells, Worcs: Porter Press International. ISBN 9781913089979.

=== Web ===
- Donald Campbell: The Man in the Shadow
- Dynamo Dean and the Griffon Bud: an ill-starred love affair

| Preceded by James May | Guild of Motoring Writers Journalist of the Year Award; 2001 | Succeeded by Jeff Daniels |
| Preceded by Richard Feast | Guild of Motoring Writers Journalist of the Year Award; 2004 | Succeeded by Nick Trott |
