= Jacques de Champlain =

Canadian scientist, physician and professor

Jacques de Champlain, OC (French pronunciation: [ʒak də ʃɑ̃plɛ̃]; 13 March 1938 - 15 July 2009) was a scientist, doctor and professor from the Province of Quebec.

Jacques de Champlain was a graduate of the Université de Montréal and McGill University and a pioneer in research on the nervous system. He was also a member of the Royal Society of Canada, an Officer of the Order of Canada and an Officer of the Ordre national du Québec. He was a research professor in the Departments of Physiology and Medicine at the Université de Montréal. De Champlain died of a heart attack.
