= SS Lake Manitoba =

Cargo Liner

History
- Name: (1903-1918) Lake Manitoba; (1918-1924) Iver Heath
- Namesake: Lake Manitoba
- Owner: (1901-1903) Elder Dempster; (1903-1918) Canadian Pacific Railway; (1918-1921) Bishop Navigation Co. Ltd.; (1921-1923) Canada Steamship Lines Ltd; (1923-1924) Crete Shipping Co. Ltd.
- Port of registry: (1901-1918) Liverpool, United Kingdom; (1918-1923) Montreal, Canada; (1923-1924) London, United Kingdom
- Builder: CS Swan & Hunter Ltd.
- Yard number: 263
- Launched: 6 June 1901
- Completed: September 1901
- Acquired: 11 September 1901
- Maiden voyage: 24 September 1901
- In service: 24 September 1901
- Out of service: 1924
- Identification: Official number: 113497
- Fate: Scrapped in 1924

General characteristics
- Type: Cargo liner
- Tonnage: 9,674 GRT
- Length: 143.10 metres (469 ft 6 in)
- Beam: 17.13 metres (56 ft 2 in)
- Depth: 9.72 metres (31 ft 11 in)
- Installed power: Two triple expansion steam engine
- Propulsion: Two screws
- Sail plan: (Summer) Liverpool - Quebec - Montreal; (Winter) Liverpool - Halifax
- Speed: 14 knots
- Capacity: Accommodation for 122 First class, 130 Second class & 500 Third Class passengers
- Notes: Four masts, a single funnel and five boilers

SS Lake Manitoba was a British passenger-cargo liner built in 1901 by C.S. Swan & Hunter at Wallsend for the Beaver Line service between Liverpool and Canada. She was launched on 6 June 1901 and entered service that September, with accommodation for 752 passengers in three classes. After a brief spell as a troopship in the Second Boer War, she was acquired by Canadian Pacific Railway in 1903 and continued on the Liverpool–Quebec–Montreal route. In World War I she was requisitioned by the Admiralty as a troopship, mainly carrying Australian troops to Europe. She survived a grounding near Kuwait in 1915 and an air raid on Port Said in 1916. In August 1918 she was gutted by fire and scuttled at Montreal. She was refloated, sold, converted to a cargo-only ship and renamed Iver Heath. After passing to Canada Steamship Lines and then the Crete Shipping Co., she was broken up at Bremen in 1924.

== Construction ==
Lake Manitoba was built at the CS Swan & Hunter Ltd. shipyard in Wallsend, United Kingdom and launched on 6 June 1901 before being completed in September that same year. The ship was 143.10 metres (469 ft 6 in) long, had a beam of 17.13 metres (56 ft 2 in) and a depth of 9.72 metres (31 ft 11 in). It was assessed at 9,674 GRT and had two triple expansion steam engine driving two screw propellers. The ship could reach a speed of 14 knots and had accommodation for 122 First class, 130 Second class & 500 Third Class passengers.

== Early career ==
Lake Manitoba sailed on her maiden voyage from Liverpool to Quebec and Montreal with 336 passengers under the command of Captain W. H. Taylor on 24 September 1901. She mainly served on the Beaver Line service between the United Kingdom and Canada until she was requisitioned by the Admiralty as a troopship for the Second Boer War in 1902 and made two round voyages between Bombay, Colombo and South Africa. Following the war, Lake Manitoba returned to civilian service and was acquired by the Canadian Pacific Railway in March 1903. She conducted her last voyage for the Beaver Line from Liverpool to Saint John on 31 March 1903 and returned to her usual Liverpool to Quebec and Montreal route under the Canadian Pacific banner on 5 May 1903.

== War Service ==
At the outbreak of World War I in August 1914, Lake Manitoba was requisitioned by the Admiralty as a troopship and repainted in the iconic Dazzle camouflage. She served mainly to carry Australian troops to Europe and ran aground while approaching Kuwait on 27 December 1915, but was refloated four hours later and continued on to Basra without further incident. She escaped serious damage again when she was laid up in Port Said on 21 May 1916, which saw hostile aircraft bomb the town and harbour. In October 1917, the ship was part of a convoy of 15 ships that were sailing from Sydney to Liverpool while being escorted by HMS Carnarvon. near the end of the war, Lake Manitoba was laid up in Montreal, when on 26 August 1918, the ship was gutted by a fire and had to be scuttled. She was refloated the following month and sold by the underwriters to Bishop Navigation Co. Ltd. on 8 October 1918. The ship was refitted to be an only cargo carrying ship and renamed to Iver Heath before she resumed her North Atlantic service the following year as the war had come to an end.

== Final years ==
Lake Manitoba received minor damage on 27 July 1921 when she collided with the steamer Nesco while both were at anchor in Bristol, as the tide had made both ships swing towards each other. Not long after, on 28 September 1921, Lake Manitoba was sold to the Canada Steamship Lines before she was sold again to Stelp & Leighton's Crete Shipping Co. Ltd. on 25 July 1923. The following year, Lake Manitoba was withdrawn from service and taken to Bremen to be scrapped.
