= USS Lake Champlain =

Three ships of the United States Navy have been named USS Lake Champlain, after the Battle of Lake Champlain in the War of 1812.

- USS Lake Champlain (1917), was a cargo ship in use during 1918 and 1919 and then sold
- USS Lake Champlain (CV-39), was an aircraft carrier in service from 1945 to 1966
- USS Lake Champlain (CG-57), was a guided missile cruiser in service from 1988 to 2023
