= Samuel de Champlain (tugboat) =

Tugboat operating on North American Great Lakes

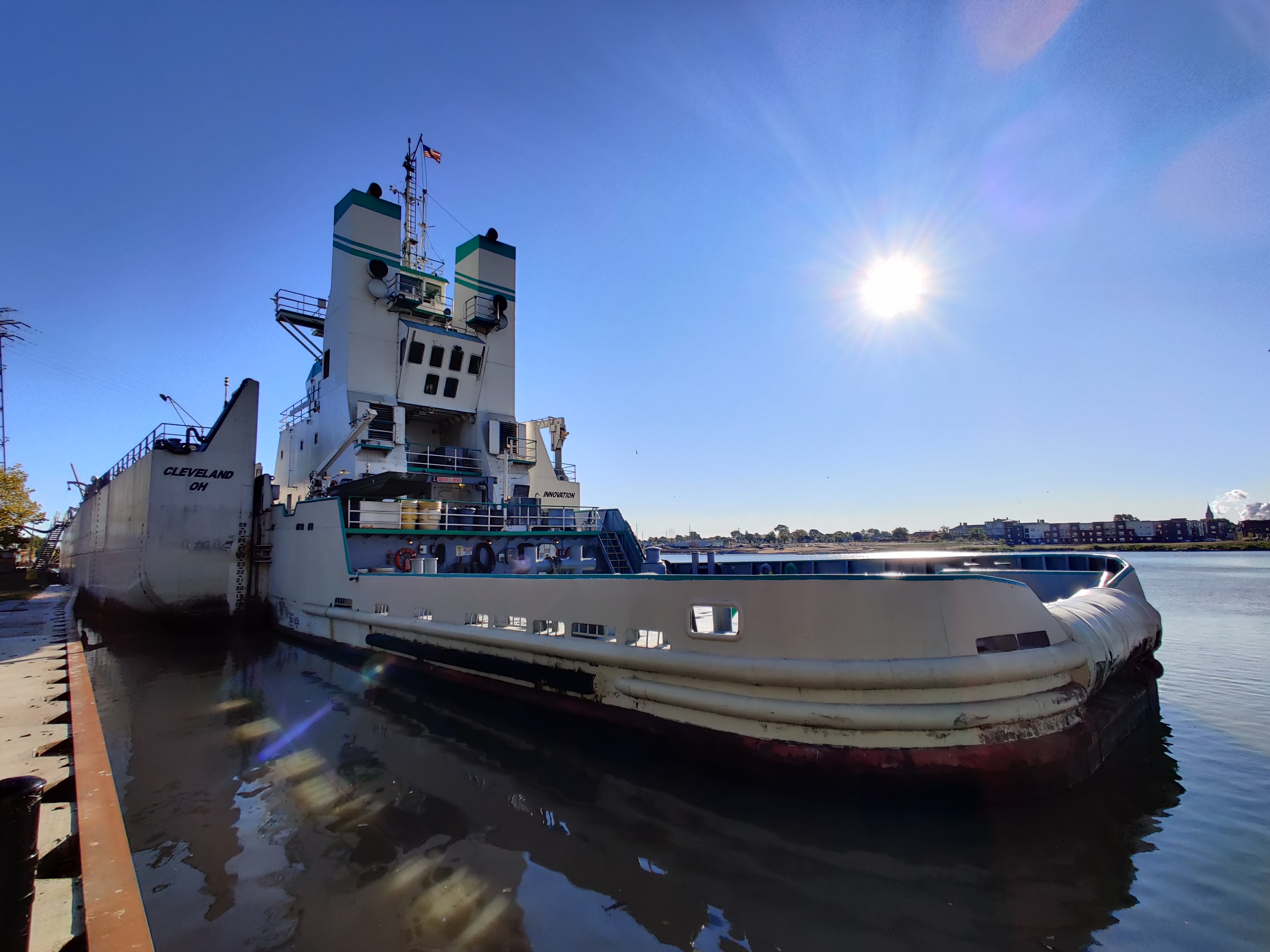
- Samuel de Champlain with the Innovation docked in Toledo, Ohio

History
- Name: Musketeer Fury (1976-1978); Tender Panther (1978-1979); Margarita (1979-1983); Vortice (1983-1999); Norfolk (1999-2006); Samuel de Champlain (2006-present)
- Owner: Lafarge North America
- Operator: Andrie Inc.
- Port of registry: Cleveland, OH, USA
- Builder: Mangone Shipbuilding
- Launched: 1976
- Identification: MMSI number: 367084930; IMO number: 7433799; Callsign: WDC8307

General characteristics
- Class & type: Tug boat
- Length: 140 ft (43 m)
- Beam: 39 ft (12 m)
- Decks: 3
- Installed power: 7200 HP
- Propulsion: two propellers diesels

Samuel de Champlain is a large, twin-screw tugboat owned by Lafarge North America and managed by Andrie Inc. The vessel is paired with the cement barge Innovation, transporting cement products between Lafarge facilities across the Great Lakes.

== History ==
In 1976, this vessel, now known as Samuel de Champlain, was built as Musketeer Fury by Mangone Shipbuilding of Houston, Texas for Bernhard Hansen and Company of Norway.

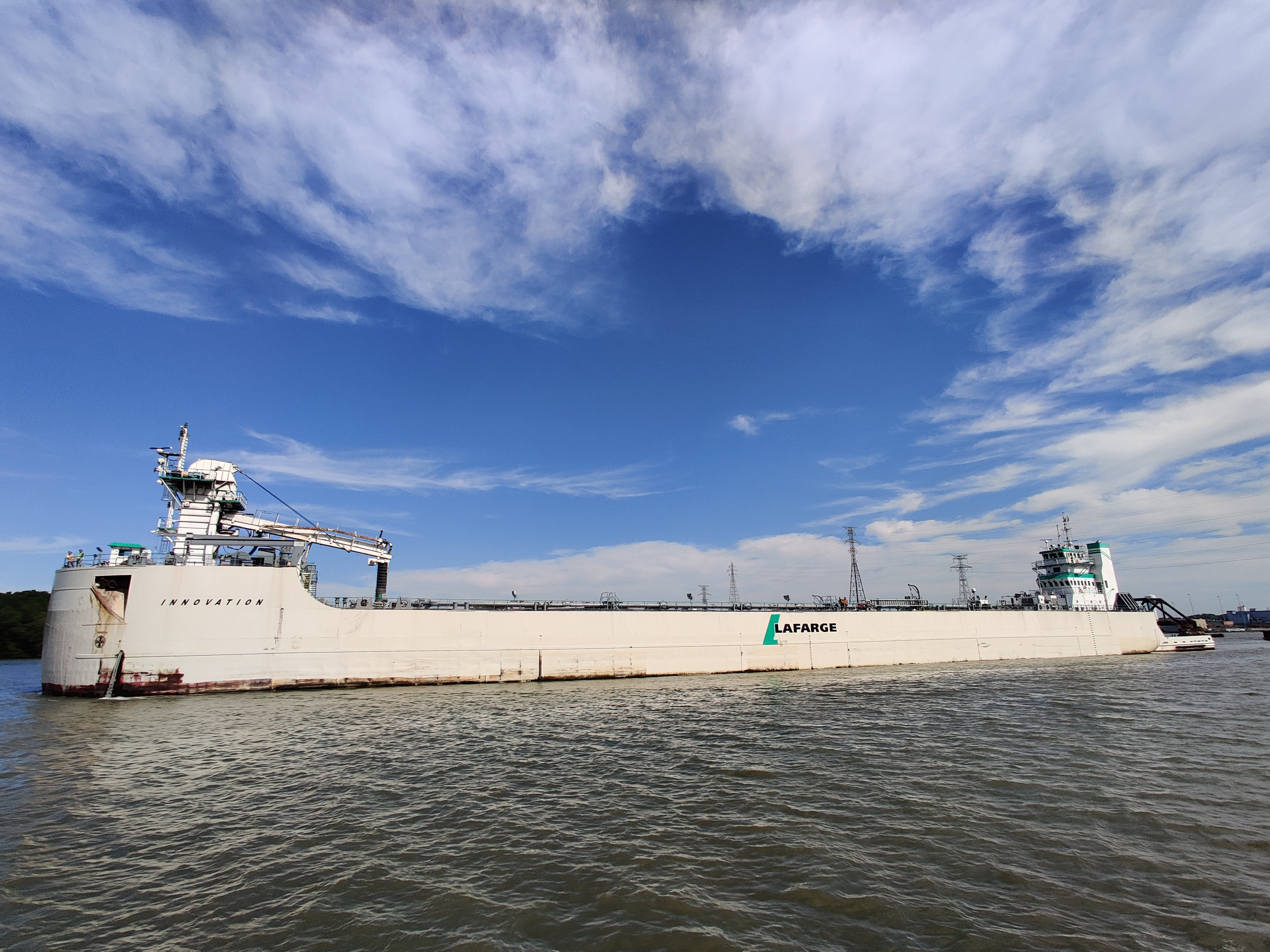
Samuel de Champlain pushing Innovation on the Maumee River

Two years later in 1978, the tug was sold and renamed Tender Panther. The tug was sold again in 1979 and renamed Margarita. In 1983, the tug changed hands for the third time and was renamed Vortice. In 1993, after ten years sailing as Vortice, the vessel suffered a major fire near the islands of Azores. Having become a burnt-out hull, Vortice was laid up in Trieste, Italy. In 1996, the Canadian company McKeil Marine purchased the hull and towed it across the Atlantic to the company's yard in Hamilton, Ontario. In 1999, Vortice was sold to Seaforce Marine Incorporated of Norfolk, Virginia where the tug was completely rebuilt and renamed Norfolk.

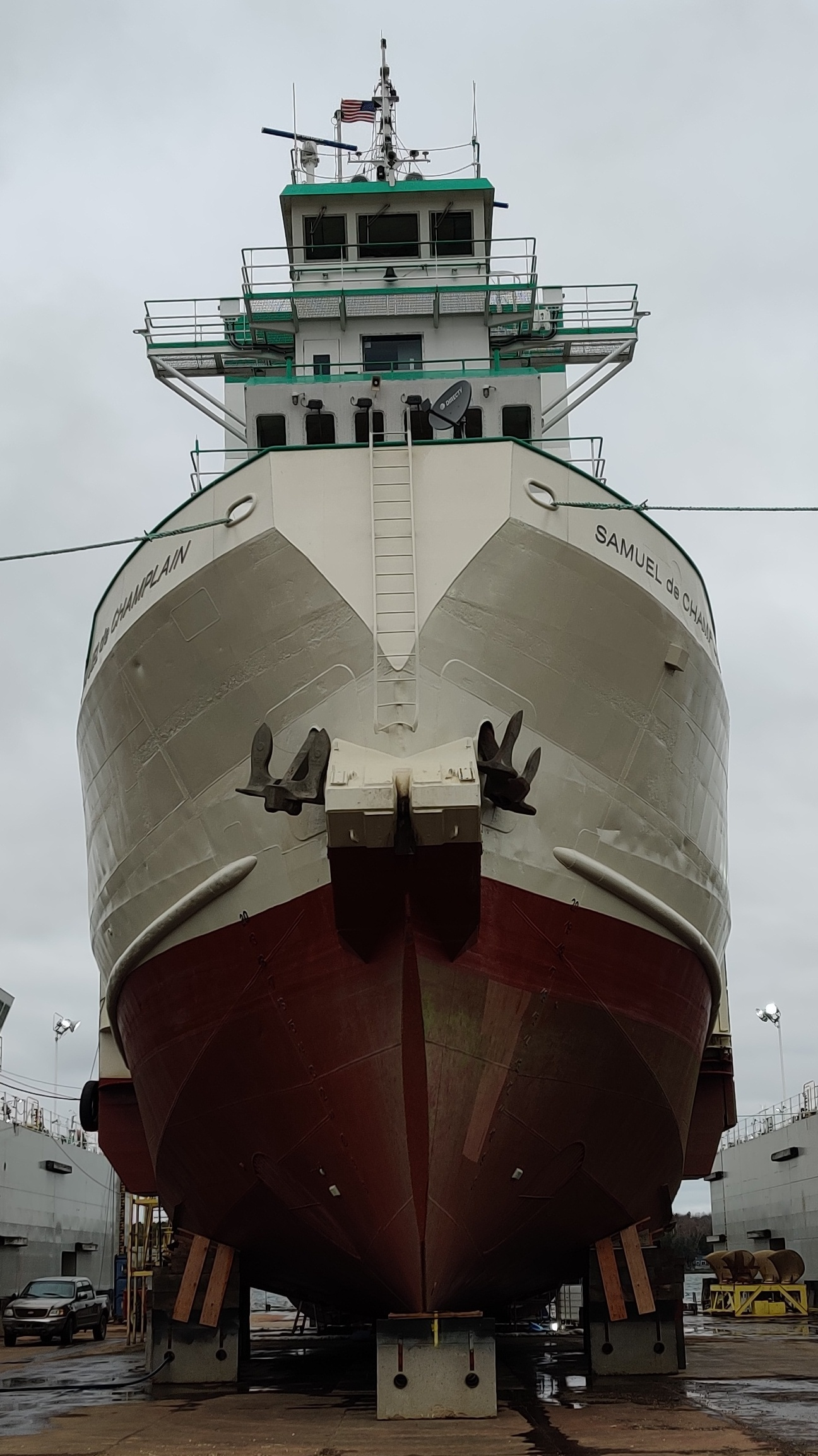
Samuel de Champlain in drydock. (2021)

In 2006, Norfolk was purchased by Lafarge North America and renamed Samuel de Champlain after the French explorer. The tug was modified with a Bludworth coupler system by Manitowoc Marine Group so it would be compatible with the 460 foot-long cement barge Innovation. The barge is capable of carrying up to 19,449 short tons of cement.
