= List of Old Derbeians =

This is a list of notable Old Derbeians, former pupils and masters of Derby School (from the 12th century to 1989) and of Derby Grammar School (since 1994), in Derby, England.

Derby School coat of arms

== Notable old boys ==
=== Born in the 16th century ===
- Blessed Edward James (1557–1588), Roman Catholic martyr
- John Cotton (1585–1652), New England Puritan

=== Born in the 17th century ===
- George Sitwell (c.1600-1667), Ironmaster and High Sheriff
- John Flamsteed (1646–1719), England's first Astronomer Royal
- Anthony Blackwall (1672–1730), classical scholar
- Henry Cantrell (1684–1773), clergyman and religious controversialist
- William Budworth (c. 1699–1745), schoolmaster

=== Born in the 18th century ===
- Sir John Eardley Wilmot (1709–1792), Chief Justice of the Common Pleas
- Joseph Wright (1734–1797), artist
- Daniel Coke (1745–1825), barrister and member of parliament
- Alleyne FitzHerbert, 1st Baron St Helens (1753–1839), diplomat
- Joseph Strutt (1765–1844), cotton manufacturer and philanthropist
- Sir William Gell (1777–1836), archaeologist

=== Born in the 19th century ===
- Sir Francis Seymour Haden (1818–1910), surgeon and artist
- Henry Howe Bemrose (1827–1911), member of parliament for Derby
- Unwin Sowter (1839–1910), maltster, cricketer and Mayor of Derby
- John Cook Wilson (1849–1915), philosopher
- J. M. J. Fletcher (1850–1934), historian
- Frank Styant Browne, chemist and photographer
- E. W. Hobson FRS (1856–1933), mathematician
- Richard Mansfield (1857–1907), actor
- John Atkinson Hobson (1858–1940), social theorist and economist
- Walter Weston (1860–1940), missionary and mountaineer
- Frederic Creswell (1866–1948), mining engineer and South African Minister of Defence
- Christopher Wilson (1874–1919), composer of theatre music and author, Shakespeare and Music (1922)
- Stanley Hawley (1867–1916), pianist and composer.
- Lawrence Beesley (1877–1967), RMS Titanic survivor and author
- William Henry Ansell (1872–1959), architect, President of the Royal Institute of British Architects from 1940 to 1943
- Walter Greatorex (1877–1949), composer
- Charles Tate Regan (1878–1943), ichthyologist
- Sir George Simpson FRS (1878–1965), meteorologist
- Geoffrey Shaw (1879–1943), composer and musician
- Guy Wilson (1882–1917), cricketer and soldier
- William George Constable (1887–1976), art historian
- Frank Conroy (1890–1964), actor
- Robert Howe (1893–1981), last British Governor-General of the Sudan, 1947–1955
- Ernest Sterndale Bennett (1884–1982), Theatre Director and member of the Order of Canada

=== Born in the 20th century ===
- Max Bemrose (1904–1986), Chairman of Bemrose Corporation and High Sheriff of Derbyshire
- George Timms (1910–1997), clergyman
- P. G. Ashmore (1916–2002), academic chemist
- Gilbert Hodgkinson (1913–1987), cricketer
- Spencer Barrett (1914–2001), classical scholar, Fellow and Sub-Warden of Keble College, Oxford
- George Bacon (1917–2011), nuclear physicist
- Ted Moult (1926–1986), farmer and TV personality
- Alexander Morrison (1927–2012), judge
- John Stobart (born 1929), maritime artist
- Robert Grimley (born 1943), Dean of Bristol since 1997

== Notable masters ==
- John Meade Falkner, novelist and poet
- Rev. Robert de Courcy Laffan (Senior Classical Master, 1880–1884), principal of Cheltenham College, member of the International Olympic Committee
- Henry Judge Hose (Maths master, 1867–1874), mathematician

== See also ==
- List of Masters of Derby School
- Category:People educated at Derby School

== Sources ==
- Derby School: a Short History by George Percy Gollin
