= List of masters of Derby School =

Arms of Derby School

This is a list of the Headmasters and masters of Derby School, England.

== List of Headmasters ==
- ante 1159 Willielmus Barbae Aprilis
- 1261–1275 Magister Nicholas
- 1275–12nn William Goodman
- 12nn–1291/92 Robert Ingram
- 1291/92–? Magister Domus Scte Helene
- 1348–? Sir Peter Carre
- 1406–? Rev. Stephan Belle
- 1527–? Rev. Henry Brytlebank
- 159n–1610 Rev. Richard Johnson
- 1610–1627 Rev. Gervase Hall
- 1627–164n Mr. Raynor
- 164n–1652 Rev. John Bingham
- 1652–165n Richard Brandreth
- 165n–1664/7 Rev. Hill
- 1664/1667–1668 Rev. William Osborne
- 1668–167n Robert Stone
- 167n–168n Rev. John Mathews
- 168n–1684 Rev. Jasper Horsington
- 1684–1697 Rev. Thomas Cantrell MA (1649–1698)
- 1697–1772 Rev. Anthony Blackwall MA (Cantab.) (1672–1730)
- 1722–c1750 Rev. Josua Winter
- c1750–1761 Rev. George Almond
- 1761–1774 Rev. Thomas Manlove MA (Cantab.) (1729–1 February 1802)
- 1774–1793 Rev. Anthony Clarkson or Clarkstone MA (Cantab.) (1748–1819)
- 1795–1834 Rev. James Bligh (16 May 1760 – 18 August 1834), cousin of William Bligh of the Bounty
- 1834–1843 Dr William Fletcher
- 1843–1858 John Hudson
- 1858–1865 Rev. Dr Thomas Humphreys Leary
- 1865–1889 Rev. Walter Clark BD (1838–April 12, 1889)
- 1889–1896 James R. Sterndale Bennett MA (Cantab) (1847–1928)
- 1898–1906 Percy Kitto Tollit MA (Oxon.)
- 1906–1909 Rev. A. Ernest Crawley (11 July 1867 or 1869–21 October 1924)
- 1909–1931 Rev. Angus Clifton Knight MA (Oxon.) (1873–16 April 1931)
- 1931–1942 Thomas John Pinches York MA (Cantab.) (1 August 1898 – 25 May 1970) (previously at Bedford School, later Headmaster of the Merchant Taylors' School, Crosby, 1942–1964, and President of the Headmasters' Association, 1950)
- 1942–1961 Leslie Bradley MA (Oxon.) (1902–2004), previously a Maths master at King Edward VII School, Sheffield
- 1961–1979 Norman Elliott MA (Oxon.) (died 2012), Maths
- 1979–1989 Brian Seager Bachelor of Science B.Sc. (Nottingham) (Nottm.)

== Notable masters ==
=== First St Helen's House period, 1863-1939 ===
- Falkner John Meade, novelist and poet
- Hewitt H. Marmaduke (assistant Classical Master, 1867 to 1870), author of A Manual of Our Mother Tongue
- Hose Rev. Henry Judge (Maths master, 1867–1874), mathematician
- Lowndes Jefferson, rower who won the Diamond Challenge Sculls at Henley Royal Regatta five times and the single scull triple crown twice
- Laffan Rev. Robert de Courcy (Senior Classical Master, 1880–1884), principal of Cheltenham College, member of the International Olympic Committee
- Tacchella Benjamin (Senior Master 1887–1913), author of The Derby School Register 1570-1901, published in 1902
- Philpot Octavius Clerk, in Holy Orders 1891, Assistant Master
- Prinach Chas.W.M. 1891, Assistant Master
- Carnegie Chas. E. 1891, Assistant Master
- Gibson Claude William (1886-1962) English and French 1914-1942
- Gately Vincent Humphrey, House Master of Gatelys
- Fuller Leslie John, House Master of Fullers
- Tanner Arthur Spencer Gosset-Tanner, House Master of Tanners

=== Overton Hall and Amber Valley period in World War II 1939-1945 ===
Masters included:

=== Second St. Helen's House period after World War II 1945 - 1966 and at Moorway Lane at Littleover 1966 - 1989 ===
Masters in the last years at St Helen's House (1945–1966) and at Moorway Lane Littleover (1966–1989) included:

- Allitt Sidney Eric 'Rocky' BSc (Head Physics Dept and bassoon player) (1956-1981)
- Arnott 'Snotty' (English, English Literature and drama)
- Aspinall 'Rasper' (French)
- Atkinson C. Daly (Music Teacher, and pipe organ builder)
- Atkinson John Jennings, (Latin and Commander of OTC and JTC)
- Barwell 'Jed' BA (French, German)
- Bell 'Ding-dong' D.R. BSc (Maths)
- Bishop W.A. 'Billy' (Chemistry)
- Bloomer Billy (Maths)
- Bostock Russ (Sports)
- Bowker Martin (German / French)
- Bradley 'Les' (Headmaster 1942–1960)
- Brewer Viv (Music)
- Brearley D. MA (Head Geography Dept)
- Burns 'Pop' (Maths and chess)
- Butler W.O. 'Wob' BA (Geography, Deputy Headmaster from 1960)
- Clarke 'Nobby' (English)
- Coates 'Percy' (Chemistry)
- Coe Mick (Coe 90) (Maths)
- Collier-James A. (Art)
- Coupe Graham (PE & Geography)
- Curtis Samuel John (Lt.2 i/c JTC)
- D'Arcy Mrs Joan (History, also Violin player)
- Davies G.H. (Latin)
- Dickenson D.J. (Physical Education)
- Eldred 'Derdle' R.B. BA (English)
- Elliott Norman 'Sweat' or "Bog" MA (Maths, Headmaster 1961–1979)
- ‘’’ Espinosa’’’ Valerie (Head of Physics 1981- )
- Fisher John 'Running'
- Foulke Michael G. 'Mike' BSc (Chemistry, Flight Lt. last CO of CCF in 1973)
- Fox Mike (Modern Languages)
- Geddy Bill (Woodwork)
- Gibbons Miss (? subject biology?

)

- Gillard MBE Ernest William, 'Lardy' (Maths, Capt. of JTC 1928–1945, Deputy headmaster until 1961)
- Glister W.E. (Maths)
- Greenslade C.P. 'Thunderguts' MA (Modern Languages)
- Grime Rev. Allan Godfrey, (RE, English and Commander of CCF and JTC) House Master
- Guy 'Pontius' or 'Pont' BA (Head Latin Dept)
- Hastings 'Pris' (Physics)
- Hayer Gian (Chemistry)
- Hodgkinson Harry MA (Chemistry and Religious Instruction)
- Humphrey Mark (Art)
- Irving Stella Mrs S.L. BA (Modern Languages)
- Kelsey Ken (Physics)
- Kimber 'Wal' (Junior Modern Languages)
- Kirton W Frank MA (Head of English Dept)
- Lane 'Bronco' (Chemistry) (1960–1965)
- Lawson Martin (Latin & English)
- Levy 'Sol' (Modern languages)
- Lomas Brian (Physics)
- Lowes Mrs J. BSc (Mathematics)
- Marlowe Edna (French, German)
- McElroy Mark BSc(Head of Chemistry 1968–1981) (Head of Science 1981–1989)
- Melling C. 'Alf' (Chemistry)
- Millington Guy 'Spike' (Head of Biology)
- Mitchell Brian? (Geography)
- Mollison D.W. BSc (Head Biology Dept)
- Molson (Biology)
- Nazeer Mrs C. (Modern Languages)
- Newbold 'Dave' or 'Neddy' MA (Music)*
- NewtonJohn 'Isaac' ATD (Art)
- Payne (English Lit)
- Pettigrew MBE Robert Gavin (Sports and CO of CCF)
- Pickering Geof (English & Latin)
- Plank 'Josh' (RE)
- Rainbow Tony (Metalwork)
- Rayburn 'Barney' or 'Boris' MA (Head Modern Languages Dept)
- Reeson Edward Francis,'Curly' (English, CO of JTC and CCF, Rowing)
- Rhodes 'Alf' (Fizzer) BSc (Maths, Physics and RE)(1950–1965)
- Richards Jack BA (Head History Dept)
- Robson G.R. BA (English and French)
- Roebuck Dr. P.J. (Head Chemistry Dept - 1968)
- Rudge Geofrey Allen BSc (Maths and Economics and Lt CCF)
- Ryder Anthony Michael, 'Tony' (Chemistry and Physics and Lt CCF)
- Said Selim 'Sammy' (PE)
- Scott John Robert (Maths and 2Lt CCF)
- Steggals John (Maths)
- Summerbell William,'Loopy' BA (History and Latin, Lt 2i/c JTC and CCF)
- Tamblin Douglas Victor, (Geography and PE, Capt CO of CCF)
- Towers Philip James, 'Lofty' (Chemistry and Fl Lt. CO of CCF)
- Waghorne Ken (German)
- Walker 'Crispy'or 'Pongo' (Maths)
- WilkinsonPaul (geography, football 'Bands')
- Whitehall Tony BSc (Head Maths Dept and pipe organ builder)
- Wood Eric Joseph 'Loggy' or 'Timber' or 'Splinter' (Head PE Dept, CO CCF)
- Woods Alfie (Physics)
- Yeomans 'Sid' (Gen Science, Woodwork and Sex Education!)

== See also ==
- Derby School
- List of notable Old Derbeians
- Category:People educated at Derby School
