= George Croft =

George Croft may refer to:

- George W. Croft (1846–1904), American congressman for South Carolina (1903–1904)
- George Croft (priest) (1747–1809), English Anglican and Bampton Lecturer
