= William Budworth =

English schoolmaster (c. 1699–1745)

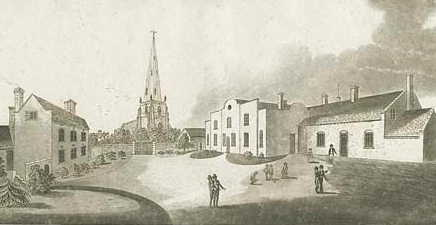
- Brewood Grammar School in 1799
- Born: c. 1699; Longford, Derbyshire
- Died: September 1745
- Education: Derby School, Market Bosworth & Christ's College, Cambridge
- Occupation: Schoolmaster

William Budworth (1699 – September 1745) was a schoolmaster at Brewood in Staffordshire, England. He taught several notable pupils, but he is most remembered for not employing Samuel Johnson as an assistant at Brewood Grammar School.

== Life and career ==
Budworth was born in about 1699 in Marston on Dove, the son of the Reverend Luke Budworth BA, rector of Cubley and vicar of Longford, Derbyshire, and afterward rector of the parishes of Tillesham and Wellingham in Norfolk following the recommendation of Thomas Coke. He was educated at Derby School, the grammar school at Market Bosworth under Anthony Blackwall, and then at Christ's College, Cambridge (BA 1720, MA 1726). Soon after graduating he was appointed master of Rugeley Grammar School in Staffordshire and he became the vicar of Hope in Derbyshire in 1731. In 1733, on the death of Dr. Hillman he became headmaster at Brewood Grammar School.

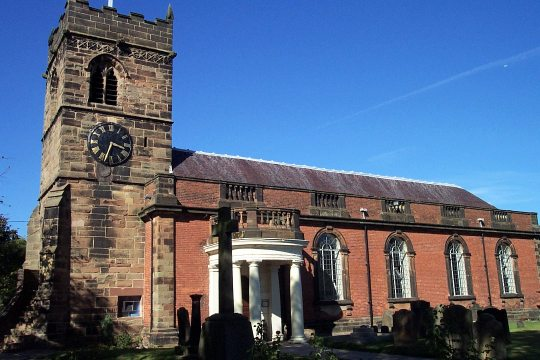
St. Mary & St. Luke, Shareshill in 2003

He obtained the vicarage of Brewood on the presentation of the Dean of Lichfield, and he was presented to the donative chapel of Shareshill, near Brewood, by Sir Edward Littleton, 3rd Baronet, of Pillaton Hall, who entrusted to him the education of his cousin and heir Edward Littleton, his uncle Fisher's son. In 1736 he would have engaged the celebrated Samuel Johnson as an assistant in the school, but he was apprehensive about the "strange motion of the head" from which Johnson suffered. Budworth thought this might make him an object of ridicule in the school. Johnson is thought to have been known to Budworth as Johnson had served as an usher to the headmaster at Market Bosworth whilst Budworth was still there.

One of Budworth's pupils was Richard Hurd, afterwards Bishop of Worcester, who says "be I possessed every talent of a perfect institutor of youth in a degree which I believe has been rarely found in any of that profession since the days of Quinctilian." Both Richard Hurd and Sir Edward Littleton were on their way to visit him in 1745 when they heard he had died in a "fit of apoplexy". Littleton paid for a memorial at his church in Shareshill.
