= John Stobart =

British maritime artist (1929–2023)

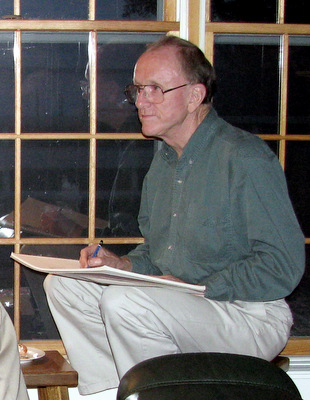
- Born: 29 December 1929; Leicester, England
- Died: 2 March 2023 (aged 93)
- Education: Derby School of Art, Derby; Royal Academy Schools, London
- Alma mater: Derby School
- Known for: Maritime painting
- Website: stobart.com

John Stobart (29 December 1929 – 2 March 2023) was a British maritime artist known for his paintings of American harbour scenes during the Golden Age of Sail.

== Early life ==
Stobart was born in Leicester on 29 December 1929; his mother died from a seizure as a complication of the birth. He was brought up in Allestree (Note: A separate village at the time, Allestree became part of the town (later city) of Derby in 1968.) and Weston Underwood, Derbyshire, and was educated at Derby Grammar School. Stobart's adored brother, George, told him, late in life, that he, John, was "drawing ALL the time on any scrap of paper you could find, from the age of 6". Stobart struggled academically, but showed a talent for painting. Despite lacking the appropriate educational qualifications, he was able to enroll at Derby School of Art (Note: Derby School of Art was one of a number of predecessor institutions of the University of Derby, founded in 1992. The Art School building on Green Lane where Stobart studied is still owned by the University and used as a rehearsal space for Derby Theatre.) in 1946 as a result of the influence of his father, a prominent pharmacist in Derby. His successful art school career led to Stobart being offered a prestigious scholarship at the Royal Academy Schools in London in 1950. He spent five years at the academy, interrupted by a period of National Service.

== Professional art career ==
Despite growing up in landlocked Derbyshire, Stobart had a fascination with the sea that stemmed from childhood visits to his grandmother in Liverpool, where he observed the city's busy docks. Following his graduation, Stobart travelled to Africa by sea in order to visit his father who had emigrated to Bulawayo, Southern Rhodesia. (Note: Southern Rhodesia is now called Zimbabwe.) The sketches he made of the twelve ports he visited on the journey inspired him to pursue maritime art as a speciality. He successfully approached shipping companies with the idea of painting new vessels from plans during their construction.

Stobart emigrated to Canada in 1957, where his paintings sold well to the various shipping companies on the Saint Lawrence River. In 1965 he made his first visit to the United States, hoping to impress some New York art galleries, and was offered a show at the Kennedy Galleries. The Wunderlich family, who owned the gallery, encouraged him to further develop his ideas for painting historic maritime scenes. With his original paintings becoming increasingly popular with private collectors, Stobart also began to publish prints of his work. In 1989 he established the Stobart Foundation, to encourage traditional artists through scholarships. As of 2015, Stobart wintered in Fort Lauderdale, Florida and summered in Westport, Massachusetts.

== Death ==
Stobart died on 2 March 2023, at the age of 93. He was survived by his wife and three children.
