= Brewood Grammar School =

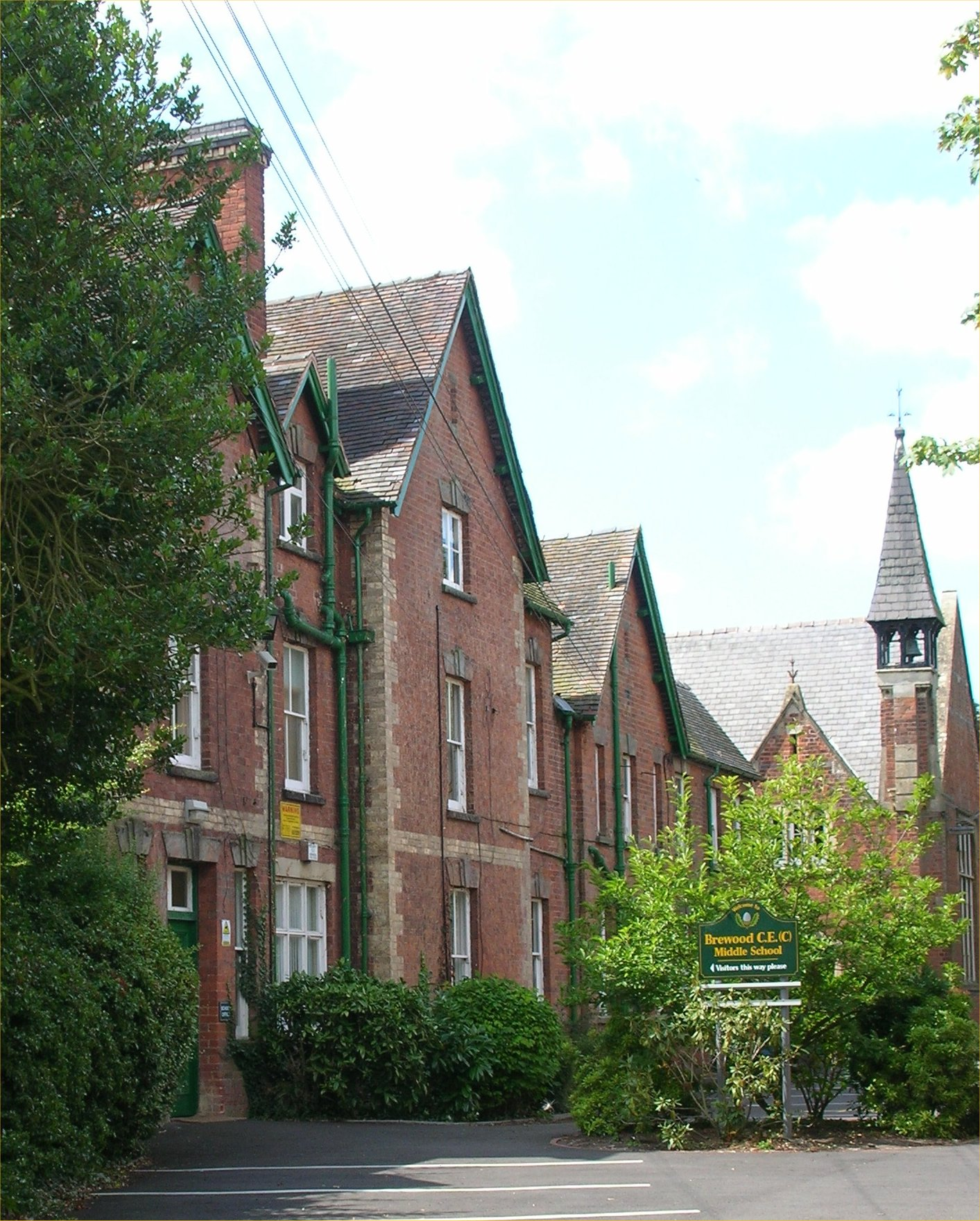

Location
- Brewood, Staffordshire; England
- Coordinates: 52.6757°N 2.1759°W

Information
- Type: grammar school
- Motto: virtute industriae doctrine
- Established: c. 1450, refounded 1553
- Founder: Bishop of Lichfield
- Closed: 1975
- Gender: male

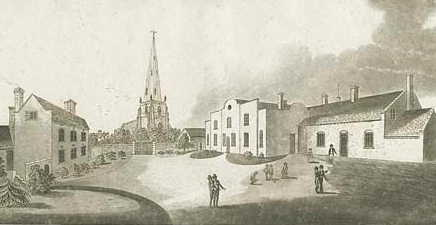

Brewood Grammar School was a boys' school in the village of Brewood in South Staffordshire, England.

Founded in the mid 15th century by the Bishop of Lichfield as a chantry school it was closed by the Dissolution of Chantries Act 1547. It was re-founded by Matthew Knightley and Sir Thomas Gifford in 1553 and survived as a grammar school until 1975 when its last headmaster, Roy Leafe, retired. It then became a mixed-sex middle school in 1977. As a 20th-century grammar school it took a number of boarders half of whom lived in the school itself and the rest lived at Wheaton Aston Hall, and taught agricultural science. The school had a small attached farm with cattle and poultry.

The original building does not survive. The earliest part of the remaining buildings, originally two houses donated to the school, dates from 1778. In 1799 these were enclosed in the school grounds by moving the road. They were rebuilt in 1856 as Rushall House (now Grade II listed) and used as a schoolroom and dormitories. In 1863 the headmaster's house was rebuilt, and further extensions to the school were made in 1898, 1926, 1935, and 1952.

The school is commemorated in a recent memorial window in the nearby parish church, St Mary and St Chad.

== Notable staff ==
- William Budworth (1699–1745) was headmaster here and declined to employ Samuel Johnson as an usher in 1736.
- George Croft (1747–1809), an English clergyman, headmaster 1780-1791.
- Mary Whitehouse (1910–2001), the TV/radio clean-up campaigner, was once a teacher at the school earlier in her teaching career.
- Sir Patrick Cormack (1939-2024), Conservative MP from 1970 to 2010, was head of history at the school from 1969 to 1970.
