= Henry Cantrell =

Henry Cantrell (baptised 17 September 1684 at St Oswald's, Ashbourne, Derbyshire – 1762) was a high-church Church of England clergyman and religious controversialist.

== Education ==
The son of Simon Cantrell (1658–1744), he was educated at Derby School (where a relation, the Rev. Thomas Cantrell, 1649–1698, was headmaster) and Emmanuel College, Cambridge. He matriculated at Cambridge in 1701, graduated BA in 1705 and MA in 1710.

== Career summary ==
Cantrell was ordained a priest at Lichfield in 1709. In 1712, the corporation of Derby gave him the vicarage of St Alkmund's, Derby, a living he kept for more than sixty stormy years, until his death at the age of eighty-nine.

Cantrell had a quarrelsome nature, and even before his induction as Vicar of St Alkmund's parish he fell out with its vestry, insisting on exercising his right to appoint one of the two churchwardens for the parish. Within months of his appointment, he was preaching against non-conformity, claiming that:

Dissenting teachers have no authority to baptize, and consequently that children... sprinkled by 'em, ought to be baptiz'd by an Episcopal minister.

He refused to bury children baptised by dissenters, which led to a furious controversy in Derby. In any event, Cantrell's bishop refused to support his stance.

One of Cantrell's best-known works was a scholarly dissertation denying the claim by the Presbyterian minister Ferdinando Shaw that King Charles I had been baptised only by a Presbyterian and never by an Episcopal minister.

Cantrell was often embattled in defending his clerical rights, including the right to plant trees in the churchyard, to control the contents of the parish register, and so forth, generally claiming the matter in hand was about an important principle and part of a wider defence of clerical rights. In 1729, he defeated the Corporation of Derby (the patrons of his living) in a legal battle over the parish's small tithes, which the corporation had taken away from him for insulting the Mayor of Derby.

When his battles led to the forced sale of much of his library, he was offered the vicarage of Brecon through the influence of Dr Henry Sacheverell, but declined it.

When Cantrell granted a licence for the secret marriage of Annabella Wilmot of Osmaston, Derbyshire, this led to the Ecclesiastical Courts Bill 1733.

Doubt has been cast on the claim in William Hutton's History of Derby (1791) that at the time of the Jacobite rising of 1745 Cantrell was a Jacobite and drank the health of the Old Pretender.

== Works ==
- The Invalidity of the Lay-Baptisms of Dissenting Teachers, Prov'd from Scripture and Antiquity (1714, in reply to the Rev. Ferdinando Shaw's Validity of Baptism Administred by Dissenting Ministers (1713)
- The Royal Martyr a True Christian, or, A Confutation of a late Assertion, viz. that King Charles I had only the lay-baptism of a Presbyterian-teacher
- Commonplace book (manuscript)

== Family ==
Cantrell first wife, Constance, was born in 1695 or 1696 and died on 24 May 1725. Their eldest surviving son became the Rev. William Cantrell (1716–1787), Rector of Stamford, Lincolnshire and Normanton, Derbyshire. On 2 August 1732, Henry Cantrell married secondly Jane Cradock, a daughter of Joseph Cradock, Rector of Markfield, Leicestershire.
