= P. G. Ashmore =

English chemist

Ashmore in May 1958.

Professor Philip George Ashmore, known as Sandy Ashmore, (5 May 1916 – 25 March 2002) was an English academic chemist and the first Professor of Physical Chemistry at UMIST, Manchester.

== Background and education ==
The son of a schoolmaster who later became headmaster of Derby School, Ashmore was educated at Derby School and then from 1934 at Emmanuel College, Cambridge. As an undergraduate, he held a scholarship, played soccer for Cambridge University and hockey for Cambridgeshire, was in his college's cricket First XI and crowned his first four years with a double first in the Natural Science tripos. For two years (1938–1940) he stayed at Cambridge as a research chemist, but this was interrupted by the Second World War.

== War service ==
From 1940 to 1945, Ashmore served in the Royal Air Force, rising to the rank of Squadron Leader. His work was in training fighter pilots.

== Career ==
In 1945 he returned to Cambridge to complete his degree of Doctor of philosophy, then became a Fellow of Emmanuel College and its Director of Studies and a Cambridge University lecturer in Physical Chemistry. When the new Churchill College, Cambridge was founded in 1959 he became one of its first Fellows and was Fellow and Tutor to Advanced Students there, 1959 to 1963.

In 1963 he moved to Manchester as the first Professor of Physical Chemistry at UMIST, from which he retired in 1981. He was also Vice-Principal (Academic Affairs) at UMIST from 1973.

From 1981 to 1985, he was a course consultant to the Open University. In retirement, he settled again in Cambridge.

== Publications ==
During his career, Ashmore published many scientific research papers, especially in Nature, the Journal of Catalysis, and Science. His early research work was on the sensitised ignitions of hydrogen with oxygen and with chlorine. An early report in Nature in 1951 of a 'lighthouse reaction' was later recognized as important, and a paper to the 5th International Combustion Symposium at Pittsburgh (1954) was much cited.

=== Selected papers ===
- A Study of Sensitized Explosions by P. G. Ashmore and R. G. W. Norrish (Proceedings of the Royal Society of London. Series A, Mathematical and Physical Sciences, Vol. 203, No. 1075, 1950)
- Induction Periods and Ignition Limits in Sensitized Ignitions of Hydrogen and Oxygen by P. G. Ashmore, F. S. Dainton and R. G. W. Norrish (Nature 175, 546–547, March 1955)
- Thermal Reaction between Hydrogen and Nitrogen Dioxide by P. G. Ashmore and B. P. Levitt (Nature 176, 1013–1015, 1955)
- Dissociative adsorption of methane and ethane on evaporated metal films by P. G. Wright, P. G. Ashmore and C. Kemball (Transactions of the Faraday Society, 1958, 54, 1692–1702)
- On Teaching High School Chemistry by P. G. Ashmore (Science, 4 June 1965)

=== Books ===
- Principles of Chemical Equilibrium by P G Ashmore (Royal Institute of Chemistry, 1961)
- Catalysis and Inhibition of Chemical Reaction by P. G. Ashmore (Butterworths, 1963) ISBN 978-1-114-16549-6
- Gas Kinetics and Energy Transfer: A Review of Chemical Literature by P. G. Ashmore and R. J. Donovan (Specialist Periodical Reports, 1978
- Principles of Reaction Kinetics by P. G. Ashmore (Royal Society of Chemistry, 1973, revised editions 1979 and 1993)

=== Editor ===
From 1965 to 1972 he was joint editor of the periodical Combustion and Flame

== Family ==
In 1943, Ashmore married Ann Elizabeth (Betty) Scott, and they had three sons and one daughter.
