= Listed buildings in Littleover =

Littleover is an electoral ward in the city of Derby, England. The ward contains eleven listed buildings that are recorded in the National Heritage List for England. All the listed buildings are designated at Grade II, the lowest of the three grades, which is applied to "buildings of national importance and special interest". The ward contains the former village of Littleover, which is now a suburb to the southwest of the centre of Derby. The listed buildings consist of houses and cottages, a church, a country house converted into a school, a horse trough, and a war memorial.

== Buildings ==
Name and location	Photograph	Date	Notes
St Peter's Church; 52.90392°N 1.50733°W		Medieval	The church has been extended and much altered through the centuries, including a considerable restoration by H. I. Stevens in 1856–57. The church consists of a nave, north and south aisles, a chancel, and a polygonal west bell tower. Inside the church, at the entrance to the bell turret, is the former Norman west doorway.
Ye Olde Cottage; 52.90279°N 1.51056°W		16th century	The cottage is timber framed with brick nogging and a thatched roof. There are two storeys, and the windows are replacement casements.
17 Shepherd Street; 52.90495°N 1.50644°W		Late 17th century	The house, which may have an earlier core, is in brick with a tile roof. There is a single storey and three bays. In the centre is a doorway with a segmental head, flanked by canted bay windows, with mullions and casements.
45 Church Street; 52.90411°N 1.50875°W		18th century	A farmhouse, later a private house, in red brick with a tile roof. There are two storeys and an attic, and three bays. The doorway has a cornice hood, there is a canted oriel window, and the other windows are a mix of sashes and casements.
Derby Grammar School; 52.89483°N 1.52770°W	—	1780s	Originally a country house, it has been much extended, converted into a hospital in 1951, and then in 1995 into a grammar school. It is partly in rendered brick and partly faced in stone, with stone dressings, a parapet and hipped slate roofs. The entrance front has ten bays, and projecting to the northeast is the original house with two storeys and attics, and three bays.
Horse trough 52.90251°N 1.51084°W		Late 18th or early 19th century	The trough is in stone and about 15 feet (4.6 m) long. It is a narrow trough formed against the bottom of the bank, with a low rubble wall at the front.
15 Normanton Lane; 52.90394°N 1.50629°W		Early 19th century	A pair of cottages later combined, in painted red brick, with modillion eaves and a tile roof. There are two storeys and two bays. The doorway has a segmental head, and the windows are casements.
11 and 15 Shepherd Street; 52.90520°N 1.50650°W		Early 19th century	A pair of houses in red brick with stone dressings, plain eaves and a slate roof. There are two storeys and three bays. The doorway on the front and the doorway in the left gable end, which also has a porch, have rectangular fanlights. The windows are sashes, and have segmental heads.
19 Shepherd Street; 52.90489°N 1.50644°W		Early 19th century	A house in red brick with stone dressings, plain eaves and a slate roof. There are two storeys and a single bay. The doorway and the windows, which are sashes, have segmental heads.
Rykneld Lodge; 52.89456°N 1.53067°W	—	c. 1830	The lodge to the former Rykneld Hall, it is in rendered brick and has an overhanging Welsh slate roof with bargeboards. There are two storeys and a north front of three bays, the middle bay projecting and gabled, and containing ogee-headed windows. In the angle is a porch with latticework, and containing two ogee-headed doorways.
War memorial 52.90386°N 1.50655°W		1921	The war memorial in the churchyard of St Peter's Church is in Darley Dale gritstone, and is in the form of a Celtic cross. It has a base of two steps, on which is a square plinth, a trapezoid socket stone, and a tapering shaft. The front of the shaft and the cross head are decorated with carvings. On the socket stone are inscriptions, and the names of those lost in the two World Wars.
