= St Helen's House =

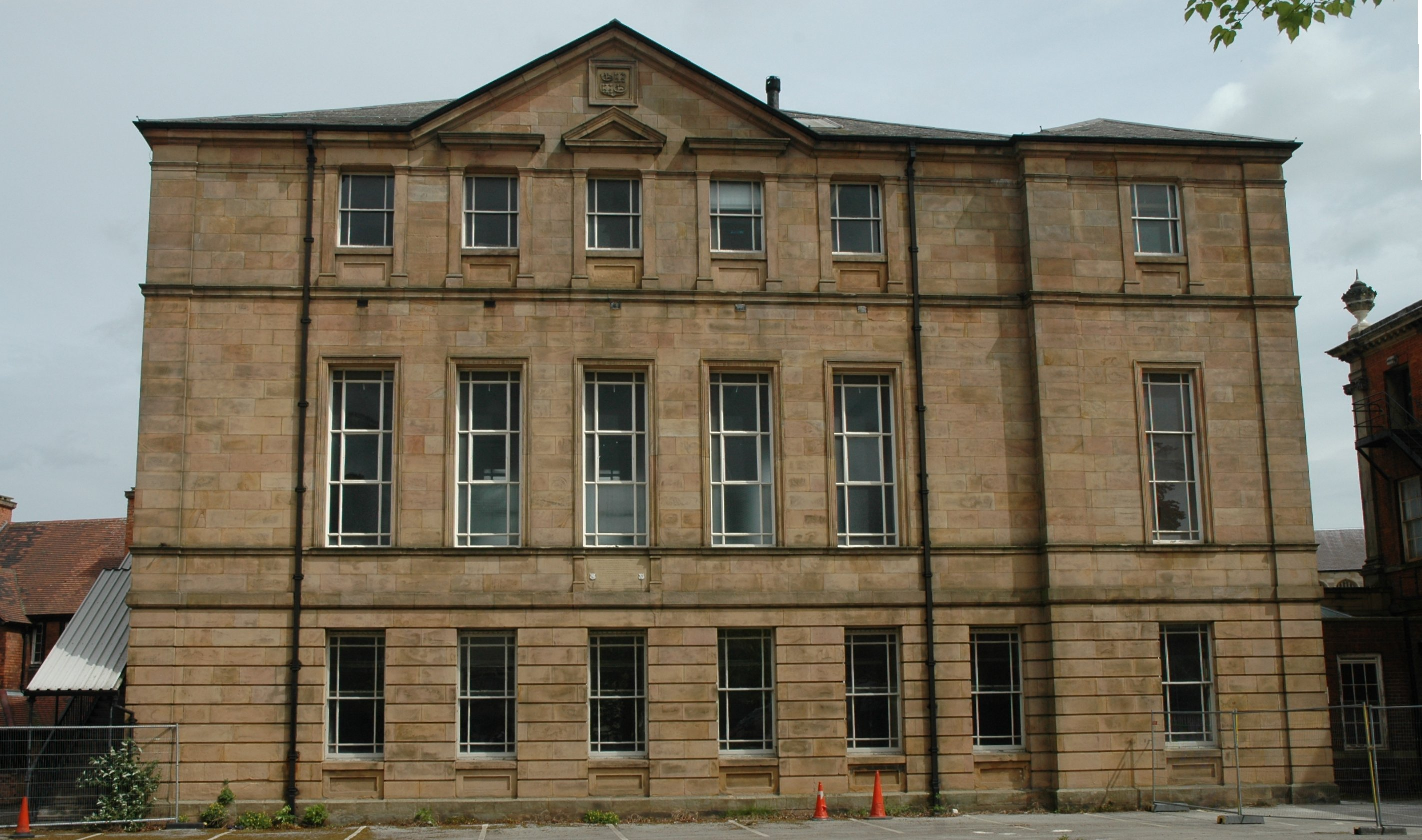
- A view of the house
- Interactive map of the St Helen's House area

General information
- Architectural style: Palladian
- Location: King Street, Derby, England
- Coordinates: 52.92738°N 1.48065°W
- Completed: 1767

Design and construction
- Architect: Joseph Pickford

St Helen's House is a Grade I listed building. situated in King Street, Derby, England. Now leased as offices, it has been used in the past as a private residence and as an educational establishment.

In 2013, renovation of the main house was completed. Originally it was planned to convert both St Helen's House and the Pearson Building into a luxury hotel, with an adjoining crescent of new apartments. Due to the economic situation in 2011 this plan was changed, and it was decided to convert the building into an office instead.

Renovation of the Pearson Building began in 2020 to convert its ground and first floors into commercial units and the upper floor into apartments.

In 2019 several of the associated building were demolished to make way for the Kings Crescent Apartments.

== Construction ==
St Helen's House was built between 1766 and 1767 for John Gisborne (of Yoxall Lodge, Staffordshire). The house was built in the Palladian style by architect Joseph Pickford. It originally stood in 80 acres (320,000 m^{2}) of parkland.

It has been described by Maxwell Craven, for the Georgian Group of London, as "one of the few surviving purpose-built Georgian gentleman’s town houses of this size and quality outside London.". His report details the construction of the House along with the alterations and extensions added by William Strutt (1756–1830).

== Strutt family ==
In 1801, the house was purchased by William Strutt, the eldest son of Jedediah Strutt (a pioneer in the cotton and hosier industry). Following William's death, the house passed to his son Edward, who became MP and Alderman of Derby. He was created Edward Strutt, 1st Baron Belper in 1846. His son, Henry Strutt, 2nd Baron Belper was born in St Helen's House in 1840.

== Educational use ==
In 1860 Edward Strutt offered to sell the house to the governors of Derby School. Initially the school could not afford to buy the house, but Edward Strutt, "being desirous of promoting the cause of education in Derby" loaned the house for free, on a temporary basis. The school moved to the house in January 1861 and purchased it from Strutt in 1863, for £3,300. £1,300 of this came from a public subscription and £2,000 from a mortgage raised by Derby Corporation.

During World War II the school was evacuated and the buildings were occupied by the Ordnance Survey organisation to undertake the creation of maps used by Allied Forces. In this period the school was housed first at Overton Hall, Ashover (September 1939 – June 1940) and secondly at Amber Valley Camp at Woolley Moor (June 1940 until July 1945). The school returned to St Helen's House in September 1945.

Derby School moved from St Helen's House in 1966 when it moved to a new purpose-built complex in Littleover called Moorway Lane. Following this move St Helen's House was used as the Joseph Wright School of Art and, from 1972, as an Adult Education centre. Due to the deterioration of the external fabric of the buildings, the centre was moved and the building became vacant in 2004.

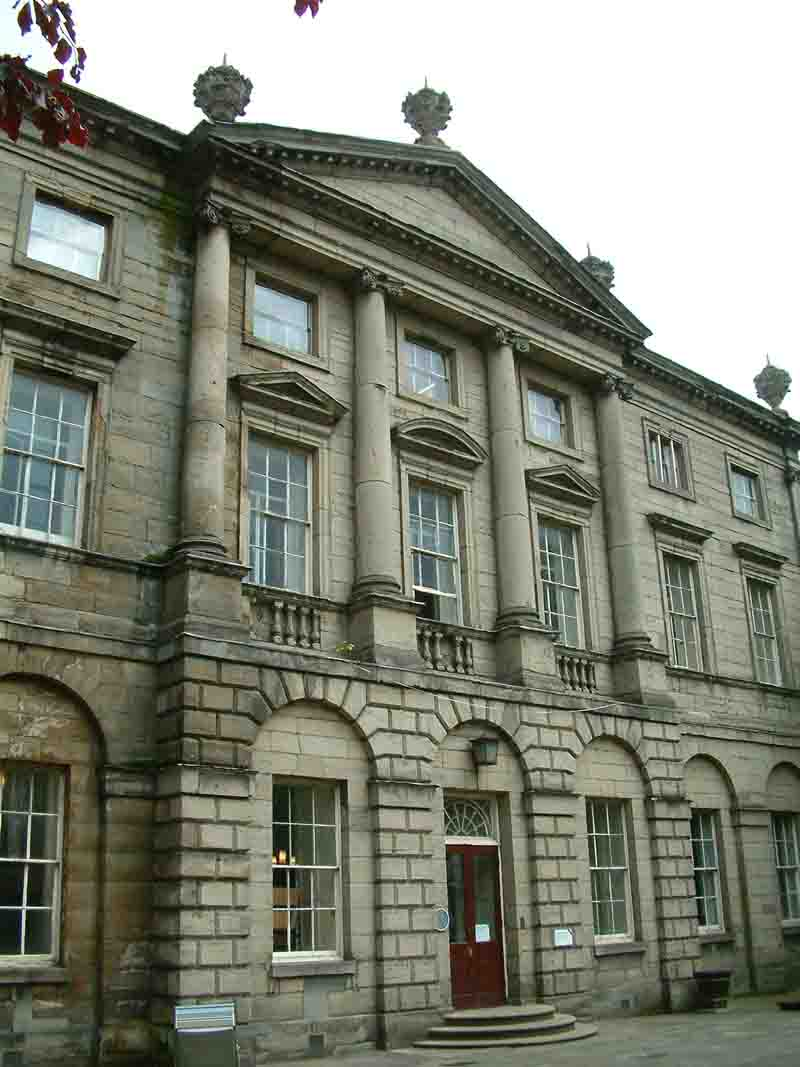
St Helen's House

== Sale, subsequent conversion and development of site ==
It was estimated that the building required £5 million of repair work. Unable to afford this, in November 2006 Derby City Council sold the house (and the neighboring Pearson Building) on a 299-year lease, to the property developer Richard Blunt.

The original plans were to convert the two buildings into a fifty-room hotel, and to construct an apartment block within a crescent where the current Chapel, gymnasium and craft workshops stand. Planning permission was granted in 2009.

During 2008 and 2009 the building was made wind and weather-proof. The interior was generally tidied up and the educational equipment removed.

In 2011, due to the economic climate, the hotel development proposals were cancelled. In July 2011 a revised planning application was submitted which proposed converting the two buildings into offices.

The building was featured in a short film entitled Derby School – the Sixties Revisited, which was made in September 2012. The film revealed the then dilapidated state of the rooms; including peeling paint and remnants of original blackboards.

Following the completion of repairs and renovations to St Helen's House, in October 2013 a Blue Plaque was placed by Derby Civic Society and Derby City Council commemorating the house as the former residence of William Strutt and Rev. Thomas Gisborne. In 2013 a firm of accountants took out a lease on the offices within the house.

As of 2013 the original link structure (which held the school bell and the entrance for all pupils except 6th formers) between St Helen's House and the Pearson Building had been demolished and replaced by a new decorative wall. As of 2021 work was underway to convert the Pearson Building into commercial units on the ground and first floors and apartments on the second floor. It is planned to convert the original headmaster's house (known by many former boys as the Armoury) into apartments. The former chemistry laboratory, the cloisters, the wooden gymnasium, the former woodwork rooms and the chapel which were showing a lot of disrepair have been demolished to make way for the Kings Crescent Apartments - 46 apartments and 3 adjacent dwelling houses.

== See also ==
- Grade I listed buildings in Derbyshire
- Listed buildings in Derby (northern area)
