= George Croft (priest) =

George Croft (1747–1809) was an English clergyman, one of the early Bampton Lecturers.

== Life ==
Second son of Samuel Croft, he was born at Beamsley, a hamlet in the chapelry of Bolton Abbey, Skipton, West Riding of Yorkshire, and baptised on 27 March 1747. Although his father was in humble circumstances, Croft was educated at the grammar school of Bolton Abbey, under the Rev. Thomas Carr. Carr taught Croft without fee, and solicited subscriptions from well-to-do friends and neighbours in order to send him to university. Admitted as a servitor of University College, Oxford, on 23 October 1762, he was chosen bible clerk on the following 6 December, and in 1768, the first year of its institution, he gained the chancellor's prize for an English essay upon the subject of Artes prosunt reipublicæ. He graduated B.A. on 16 February 1768, proceeding M.A. on 2 June 1769. Meanwhile, he had been appointed master of Beverley Grammar School on 6 December 1768; and, having been ordained, was elected as a Fellow of University College on 16 July 1779.

On 11 December 1779 Croft was instituted by his college to the vicarage of Arncliffe in the West Riding, and on 19 and 21 January 1780 took the two degrees (B.D. and D.D.) in divinity. About this time he became chaplain to the Thomas Bruce, 7th Earl of Elgin. He left Beverley at Michaelmas 1780, on being named headmaster of Brewood Grammar School, Staffordshire, a post he resigned in 1791 to accept the lectureship of St. Martin's, Birmingham, to which was later added the chaplaincy of St. Bartholomew in the same parish. He took a particularly strong polemical line in preaching against local Dissenters, who from 1780 included Joseph Priestley.

On 12 October 1780, Croft married Ann, daughter of William Grimston of Ripon, by whom he had a son and six daughters.

In 1786, Croft was invited to give the Bampton Lectures. From his old college friend John Scott, 1st Earl of Eldon, he received in 1802 the rectory of Thwing in the East Riding, which he was allowed to hold, by a dispensation, with the vicarage of Arncliffe. He died in Birmingham on 11 May 1809, aged 62, and was buried in the north aisle of St. Martin's Church, Birmingham, where there is a monument to his memory.

== Works ==
George Croft published:

- A Sermon [on Prov. xxiv. 21] preached before the University of Oxford, 25 October 1783, Stafford, 1784.
- A Plan of Education, delineated and vindicated. To which are added a Letter to a Young Gentleman designed for the University and for Holy Orders; and a short Dissertation upon the stated provision and reasonable expectations of Public Teachers, Wolverhampton, 1784.
- Eight Sermons preached before the University of Oxford, the Bampton Lectures, Oxford, 1786.
- The Test Laws defended. A Sermon [on 2 Tim. ii. 21] … With a preface containing remarks on Dr. Price's Revolution Sermon and other publications, Birmingham, 1790.
- Plans of Parliamentary Reform, proved to be visionary, in a letter to the Reverend C. Wyvill, Birmingham, 1793.
- Thoughts concerning the Methodists and Established Clergy, London, 1795.
- A Short Commentary, with strictures, on certain parts of the moral writings of Dr. Paley and Mr. Gisborne. To which are added … Observations on the duties of Trustees and Conductors of Grammar Schools, and two Sermons, on Purity of Principle, and the Penal Laws, Birmingham, 1797.
- An Address to the Proprietors of the Birmingham Library, Birmingham [1803].

After his death appeared Sermons, including a series of Discourses on the Minor Prophets, preached before the University of Oxford, 2 vols. Birmingham, 1811. Prefixed is brief sketch of the author's life by the Rev. Rann Kennedy of Birmingham grammar school.

== Notes ==
Attribution

This article incorporates text from a publication now in the public domain: Stephen, Leslie, ed. (1886). "Croft, George". Dictionary of National Biography. Vol. 6. London: Smith, Elder & Co.
