= Derby Grammar School =

Coordinates: 52°53′42″N 1°31′39″W

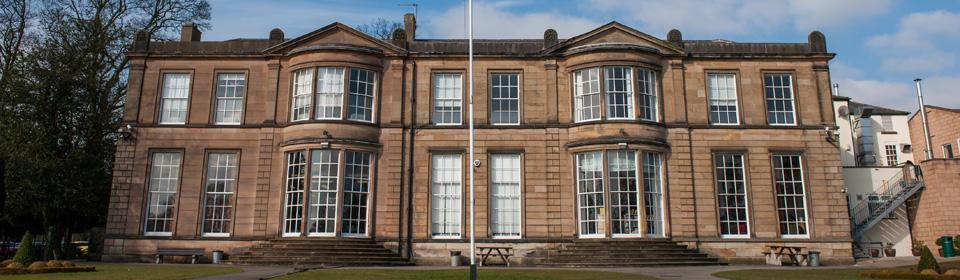
- The Main Building
- Littleover, Derby, Derbyshire, DE23 4BX; England

Information
- Type: Private day school
- Motto: Vita sine litteris mors Latin Life without learning is death
- Religious affiliation: Church of England
- Established: 1995
- Head: Alistair Bond
- Staff: 45 (approx.)
- Gender: Coeducational
- Age: 4 to 18
- Enrolment: 240 (approx.)
- Houses: Atkinson, Bemrose, Blackton, Derby
- Colours: Green & navy blue
- Chairman of Governors: Andrew Gentles
- Patron: Nigel Rudd
- Visitors: The Bishop of Derby, Duke of Devonshire
- Former pupils: Old Derbeians
- Website: derbygrammar.org

Derby Grammar School is a selective private day school in Littleover near the city of Derby, England. Founded in 1995 as a continuation of Derby School, founded in 1160, it educates girls and boys between the ages of 4 and 18.

The school currently has about two hundred and forty pupils. The Sixth form has been co-educational since September 2007, and an Infant school was opened in September 2019.

== Admissions ==
The school is academically selective; scholarships and bursaries offering a discount on the school's fees are available.

== Premises ==
The school occupies Rykneld Hall, a Grade II listed 18th-century country house in Littleover, built in 1780 as a private residence and used as a hospital in the second half of the 20th century. After conversion, the school was opened in 1995.

Teaching buildings for Humanities, Sciences, Design and Technology, and Arts have been added to the campus, along with the main school hall, which is linked with the old quadrangle and contains a stage and an organ, with an attached kitchen. The new block, called the Bagshaw Building, was opened in 2000. There is also a cricket pavilion.

The woodland, mature trees, grassland, and water areas in the school's grounds are designated as Wildlife Site 38 and safeguarded in the City of Derby's Local Plan, Policy E4 (Nature Conservation). Such sites are "considered irreplaceable".

New school sports facility, Rykneld Sports Centre, located a short distance away from the main site, was opened in September 2017.

== Curriculum ==
The curriculum is built around teaching for GCSE and A-level. Subjects taught include English, Latin, French, German, Spanish, Classics, Maths, Chemistry, Physics, Biology, History, Ancient History, English Literature, Geography, Religious Studies, Art, Music, Design Technology and Economics.

== Sport ==
The main sports offered at the school are cricket, hockey, and rugby union, plus athletics, cross country, swimming, squash, basketball and badminton.

== Extra-curricular ==
Activities include school dramatic productions, the Duke of Edinburgh Award, public speaking, World Challenge, debating, a School choir and orchestra, adventure training and the Arts Award examined by LAMDA. There are music and drama workshops with the Hot House Music Schools youth music group.

The school supports various charities, including YMCA Derbyshire and the Gedeli B School in the Mwanza Region of Tanzania. It raises money annually for both projects and sends Sixth Form students out every year to Gedeli B School to assist with teaching, maintenance of classrooms and other tasks.

== School motto, arms and badge ==
The school's coat of arms, badge, and motto, are all based on those of the former Derby School. With the exception of the motto they were designed by Henry Paston-Bedingfeld, York Herald, and granted by the College of Arms in March 1998.

The motto, Vita Sine Litteris Mors (Life without learning is death), is that of the former school and is a quotation from Seneca's Epistulae morales ad Lucilium.

== Old Derbeians ==
The term "Old Derbeians" originally meant only former pupils of Derby School, but the Old Derbeians Society is now open also to ex-pupils of the new school, who are called both New and Old Derbeians. Those educated at the new school include:

- Ben Bradley (born 1989), Former Conservative member of parliament

== See also ==
- Listed buildings in Littleover
