= Anthony Blackwall =

English classical scholar and schoolmaster

The Reverend Anthony Blackwall
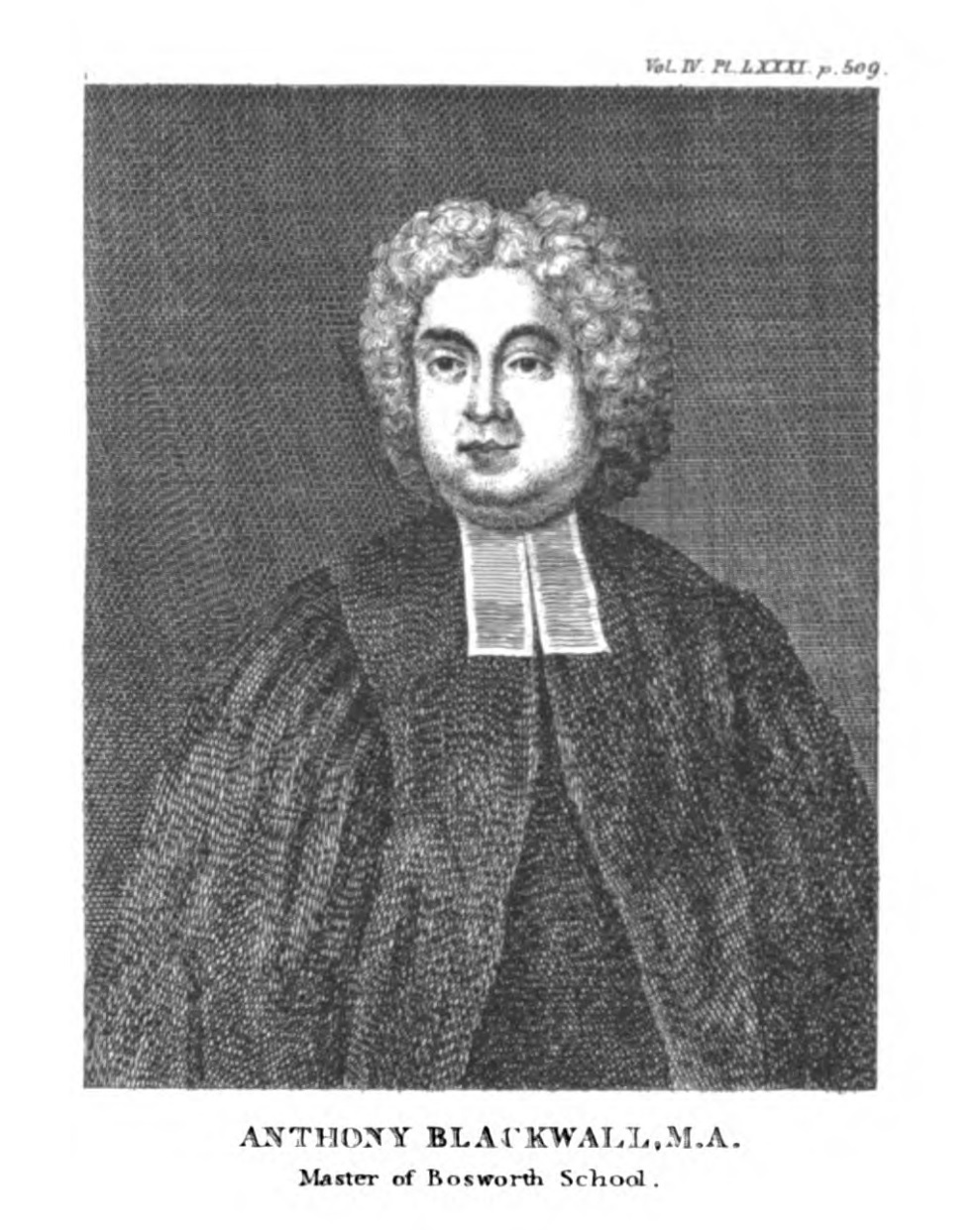
- Born: Derbyshire, England
- Baptised: 7 July 1672
- Died: 8 April 1730 (aged 57); Market Bosworth
- Education: Emmanuel College, Cambridge
- Occupations: Clergyman, schoolmaster, classical scholar
- Spouse: Two
- Children: Six
- Parent: Anthony Blackwall (father)

Anthony Blackwall (bapt. 17 July 1672 – 8 April 1730), was an English classical scholar and schoolmaster.

== Early life ==
Blackwall was the son of another Anthony Blackwall, of Blackwall, a hamlet of Kirk Ireton, Derbyshire. He was educated at Derby School and Emmanuel College, Cambridge, graduating BA in 1695 and MA in 1698.

== Career ==
In 1697, he was appointed headmaster of his old school, Derby, and lecturer of All Saints' Church, Derby. He was Vicar of Elvaston, Derbyshire, from 1699 until 1723.

In 1706, he published an edition of the verse of the Greek poet Theognis, with a translation into Latin. His next book, An Introduction to the Classics (1718), was written for schoolboys and had numerous editions. It was revised by William Fordyce Mavor as Blackwall's Introduction to the Classics in 1809.

In 1722, he became headmaster of the Grammar School at Market Bosworth, Leicestershire, and enlarged it.

He was Rector of Clapham from 1726 until his death.

At both his schools Blackwall taught from his own Latin grammar, which he eventually published anonymously in 1728 as A new Latin Grammar: being a short, clear, and easy introduction of young scholars to the knowledge of the Latin tongue.

Blackwall's last work was The Sacred Classics Defended and Illustrated, or, An essay humbly offered towards proving the purity, propriety, and true eloquence of the writers of the New Testament (1725).

== Family ==
Blackwall and his first wife had one son, another Anthony Blackwall, who graduated BA from Emmanuel College, Cambridge, in 1722. With his second wife, the widow of the Reverend Thomas Cantrell (1649–1698), there were four more sons and a daughter: Henry (died 1728), fellow of Emmanuel College, Cambridge, Robert (born 1704), a dragoon, John (baptized 1707, died 1762), an attorney at Stoke Golding, William (born about 1708), who died young, and Mary, who married John Pickering on 20 September 1733.

== Bibliography ==
- Theognis (1706)
- An Introduction to the Classics (1718, new edition as Blackwall's Introduction to the Classics, 1809)
- A new Latin Grammar: being a short, clear, and easy introduction of young scholars to the knowledge of the Latin tongue (published anonymously, 1728)
- The Sacred Classics Defended and Illustrated, or, An essay humbly offered towards proving the purity, propriety, and true eloquence of the writers of the New Testament (1725)
