= Derby School =

Former school in Derby, England

Location
- Derby, Derbyshire; England; 52.9202°N 1.4766°W

Information
- Type: Grammar school
- Motto: Vita Sine Literis Mors (Life without Learning is Death)
- Established: c. 1160; 866 years ago refounded 1554
- Founders: Walkelin and Goda
- Closed: 1989
- Houses: Gately's, Tanner's, Fuller's, and Grimes'
- Publication: The Derbeian
- Former pupils: Old Derbeians

Derby School was a school in Derby in the English Midlands from 1160 to 1989. It had an almost continuous history of education of over eight centuries. For most of that time it was a grammar school for boys. The school became co-educational and comprehensive in 1972 and was closed in 1989. In 1994 a new independent school called Derby Grammar School for boys was founded.

== Origins - around 1160 ==
The school was founded in the 12th century around 1160 by a local magnate, Walkelin de Derby (also called Walkelin de Ferrieres, or de Ferrers) and his wife, Goda de Toeni, who gave their own house to an Augustinian priory called Darley Abbey to be used for the school. Local legend has it that it was the second oldest school in England. However, there is no firm information as to the site of the original school. Recorded in a book entitled "Distinguished Alumni of Derby School" by J.M.J. Fletcher and published in 1872 there is a drawing of "St. Helen's House in Olden Times" on the inside front cover which it is believed was the original house given to the Augustinian friars. Its site eventually became a marble workshop and factory, somewhere on the opposite side of King Street from the new St. Helen's House built in 1766 and 1767.

While Derby School was in existence almost continuously for more than eight centuries, it was closed for a few years first between 1536 and 1541 as a result of the Dissolution of the Monasteries and then until its re-founding by Royal Charter in 1554

Magna Britannia says of Derby School -

In this parish [St Peter's] is the Free-school, one of the most ancient endowments of the kind in the kingdom. It is certain that it existed as early as the 12th century, and it seems to have been founded in the reign of Henry II, soon after the removal of the canons of St Helen's to Derley. Walter Durdant, Bishop of Lichfield, in his charter, speaks of the school at Derby as the gift of himself and William de Barbâ Aprilis. Soon after this, whilst Richard Peche, who succeeded Walter Durdant in 1162, was Bishop of Lichfield, Walkelin de Derby and Goda his wife gave the mansion in which they dwelt, and which Walkelin had purchased of William Alsin, to the canons of Derley, on condition that the hall should be for ever used as a school-room, and the chambers for the dwelling of the master and clerks. This ancient grammar-school was given to the corporation by Queen Mary; who were to pay to the master and under-master 13£. 6s. 8d. by four quarterly payments. This school is free to the sons of burgesses only. The masters are appointed by the corporation: the head-master has now a salary of 40£. per annum, the under-master of 20£. per annum; and they are joint lecturers, on Croshaw's foundation, at All-Saints, for which they receive 10£. each.

Further research of Lewis's Topographical Dictionary of England published in 1848 finds the following supporting evidence relating to Derby School.

The Free Grammar School is said to have been founded in the reign of Henry II., soon after the removal of the canons of the priory of St. Helen's, Derby, to Darley. Walter Durdant, Bishop of Lichfield, in his charter, makes mention of the school at Derby, as the gift of himself and William de Barba Aprilis. Queen Mary, in the first year of her reign, granted a charter to the corporation, in which provision is made for the support of this school, by the payment of £13.6.8 per annum: the Queen's grant was accompanied by the patronage of two of the churches.

The sum of £25 is annually paid to the master, by Emmanuel College, Cambridge, under the will of Mr. Ash, who also founded ten exhibitions at that college, for boys educated at this school and that of Ashby-de-la-Zouch.

Jane Walton, who died in 1603, bequeathed the sum of £40 for the benefit of the master and usher; and £100 to the master of St. John's College, Cambridge, towards the maintenance of such young men educated here as should be admitted into that college. Flamsteed, the astronomer, received part of his education at this institution.

== St. Peter's Churchyard School (c. 1554 to 1861) ==
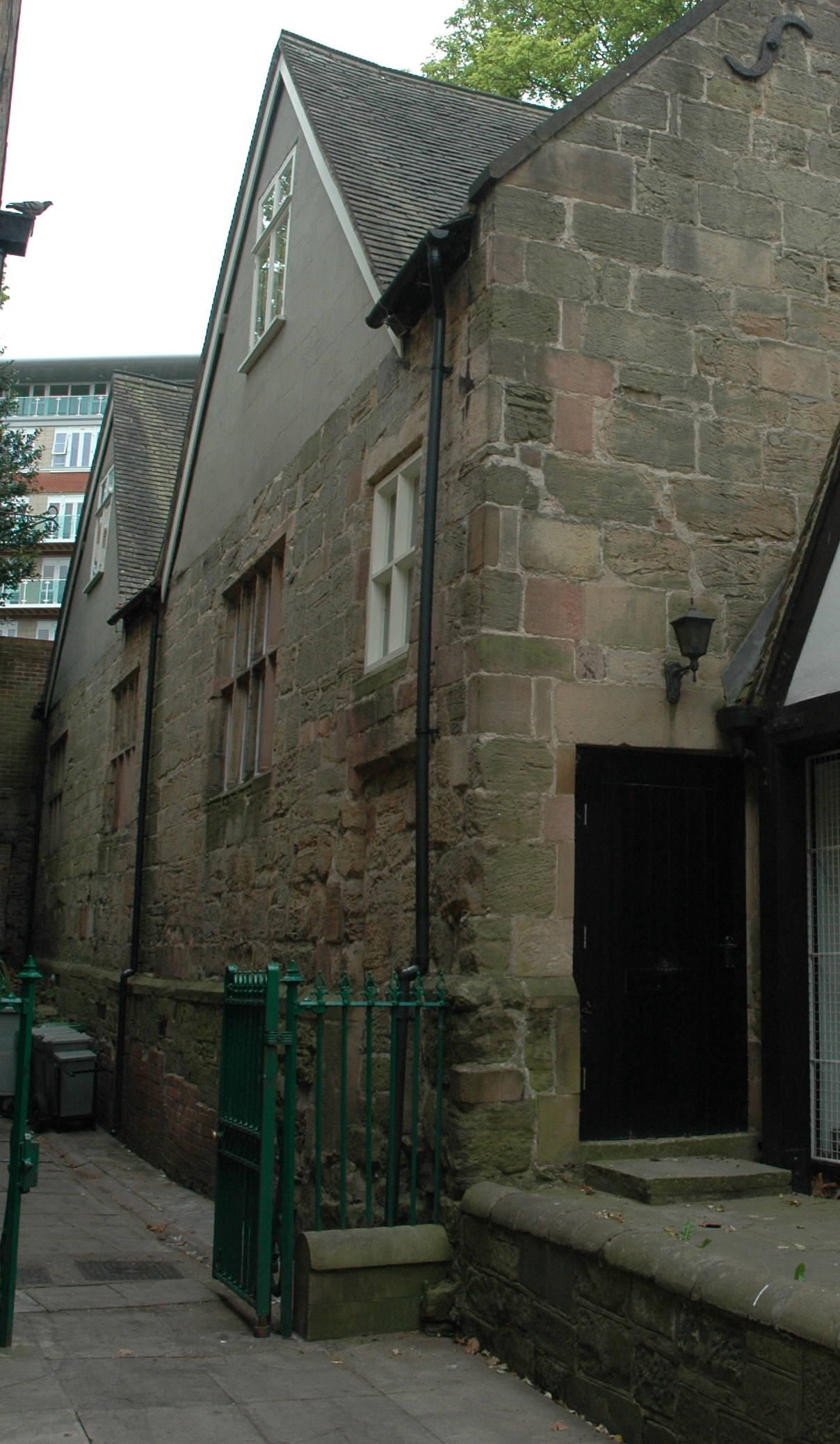
The old schoolhouse in St Peter's Churchyard

Following the Dissolution of the Monasteries from 1536 to 1541, which included Darley Abbey, a few years later on 21 May 1554, Queen Mary I by a Royal Charter, and in return for a payment of £260 13s 4d, granted the Corporation of Derby several properties and endowments which had belonged to Darley Abbey, the College of All Saints, St Michael's Church, and some other suppressed chantries and gilds, for the foundation of "a Free Grammar School, for the instruction and education of boys and youths in the said town of Derby for ever to be maintained by the Bailiffs and Burgesses of the same town."

This re-founding by Royal Charter of the new Free Grammar School was established in a purpose-built building, now called the Old Grammar School, next to St Peter's Church. In the late 20th century, this building was for some time part of the Derby Heritage Centre and is now a ladies' hairdresser's. The school remained at this site until around 1860 it moved temporarily to a property occupied by the then Headmaster, Dr. Thomas Humphreys Leary, in Friargate. Research is being undertaken in December 2016 to determine the property concerned. Due to the generosity of Edward Strutt, then the owner who had his property up for sale the school was allowed to move into St Helen's House in King Street, Derby in 1861 for a period of two years rent free. The school held a closed exhibition (a form of scholarship) worth £50 a year at Emmanuel College, Cambridge. At any one time, this could be held by one old boy of the school, who had the title at Emmanuel College of Exhibitioner. (Until the 1930s, £50 was a substantial sum, usually more than the annual wage of a farm labourer.)

While the astronomer John Flamsteed was at the Free Grammar School in the 1660s, parents were expected to provide boys with books, quill-pens, and wax candles to use when daylight failed. At that time, most masters of the school were Puritans.

== St Helen's House (1861–1939) ==
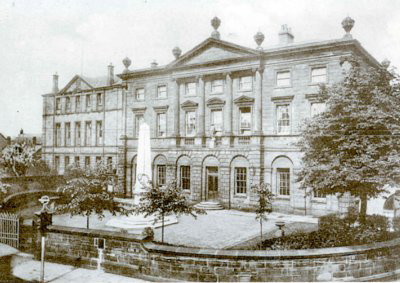
The school at St Helen's House, with the Old Derbeians' war memorial. St Helen's House is on the right and the Pearson Building, known mainly as 'B' block on the left

St Helen's House in King Street, Derby, was built in 1766-1767 as the town house for John Gisborne, an alderman of Yoxall Lodge, Staffordshire, and used to stand in 80 acres (320,000 m^{2}) of parkland.

The house was purchased by the Strutt family in 1801 and in 1860 Edward Strutt offered to sell the house for £3,300 to the governors of Derby Grammar School. Money at that time was a problem for the school, and so he loaned the property to the school for free, on a temporary basis. The boys only grammar school duly moved in for the beginning of the 1861-1862 academic year and the house was purchased outright in 1863, using £1,300 raised by public subscription and a £2,000 mortgage taken out by Derby Corporation, which was repaid by 1873.

A map of the area around St. Helen's showing the parkland dated 1852 shows that the parkland went down to the river Derwent and also where Belper Road and Bank View Road are now situated. Edward Strutt, 1st Baron Belper, the nephew of the philanthropist Joseph Strutt, an old boy of the school.

Under the Rev. Walter Clark BD (headmaster 1865-1889) the school was expanded from a local grammar school into a nationally known public school. Under his leadership, the school building was extended.

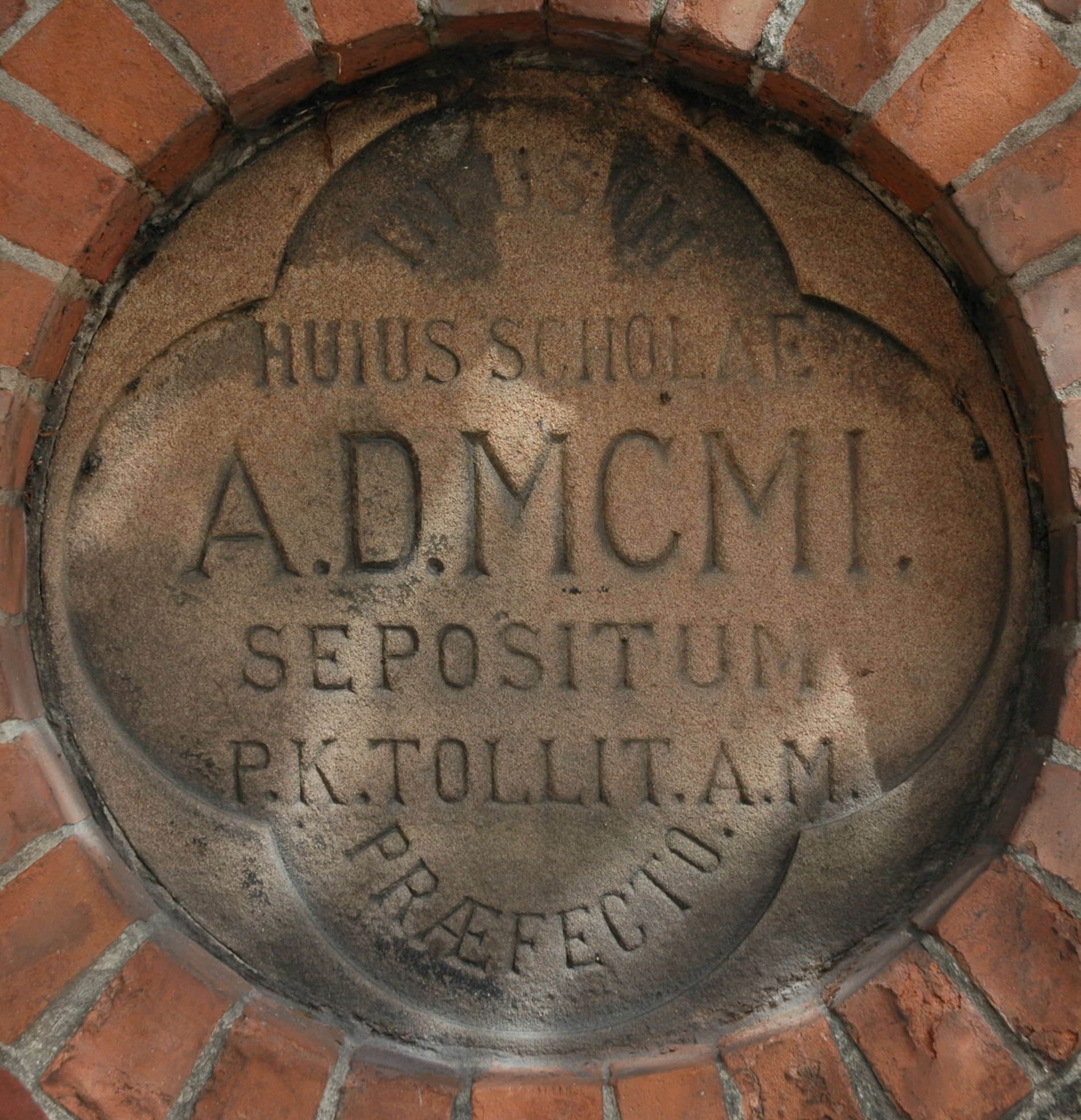
Stone at 'B'-Block

On the front of the extension, a stone bears the inscription "Quod faustum fortunatumque sit regiae scholae Derbiensi hunc lapidem initium operis felicissimis auspicus Alberti Eduardi Wal princip inlustrisque coniucis nuper suscepti sua ipse manu locavit Gulielmus Dux Devoniensis A. D. IV kal sext A. S. MDCCCLXXIV Praef Gualtero Clark A.M. Collegii S. Mar. Magd apud Cantabric olim scholar". (This part of the school became known as 'B'-block or the Pearson Building.) The royal patronage continued on 14 November 1888, when Derby School received a visit by the Prince of Wales, later King Edward VII.

The date stone on the boundary wall adjoining King Street outside 'B'-Block reads: "In usum huius scholae A.D. MCMI sepositum P.K. Tollit A.M. Praefecto".

== Derby School Chapel ==
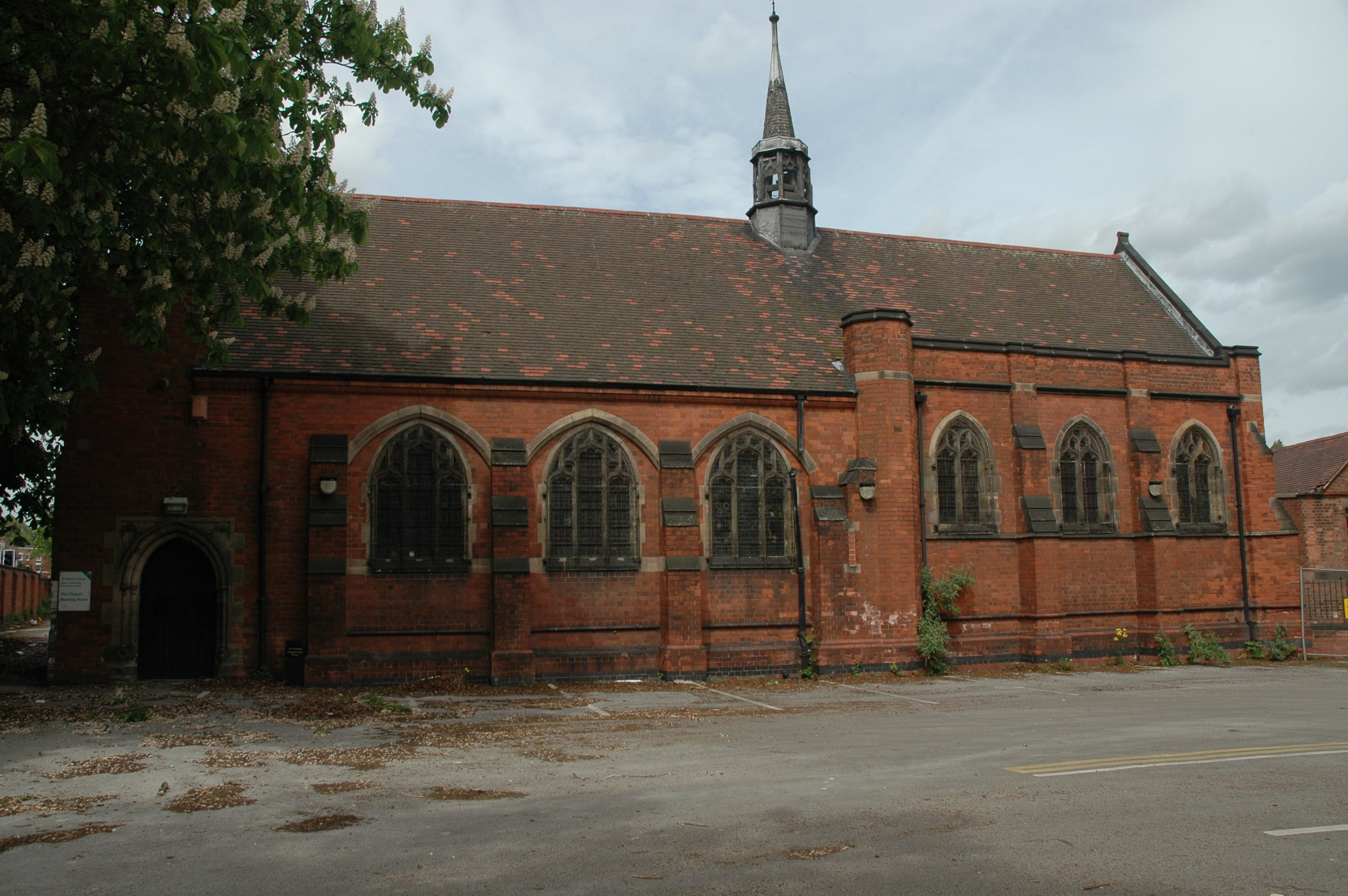
The Chapel, demolished in 2017

As the school developed further with more pupils, as a result of the building of the Pearson Building, space became a premium. An appeal was made for the erection of a school chapel and thus allowing 'Big School' to be made available solely for educational purposes. In June 1882 a new little iron chapel, often referred to as a "tin tabernacle" was erected adjoining King Street for the cost of £290, which included a sum of £150 being contributed in thank-offerings of £5 each by gentlemen educated at Derby School who had gained scholarships, exhibitions or similar honourable distinctions.

The small tin tabernacle design consisted of a 45 feet nave and being 60 feet. 10 inches in length overall. This structure was erected by a local builder at right angles to King Street, and according to two rather oblique references within "The Derbeian", the construction took place before 1891. This tin tabernacle was only ever intended to be a temporary building and, by then, monies were being raised by the trustees for a permanent structure. An Old Derbeian, who was also an architect Percy Heylin Currey (1864–1942) was commissioned to design a chapel so that as monies became available it could be extended. The dedication of the chapel, which was built with just four bays, took place in the late 1880s. Subsequently with additional monies donated the fully designed Derby School Chapel was dedicated to St. Helen in 1891. In the next three years additional monies were subscribed to the School Chapel fund and so in 1894 with extra money available the building was extended by the addition of three further bays to the west towards King Street. The completed chapel building was finished in 1894.

From 1966, due to the main school moving to its new buildings out at the Moorway Lane Site in Littleover it fell out of use and for a time was only used along with the Adult Education use that St. Helen's House and the Pearson Building were put to. The structure was seriously neglected and fell out of use entirely during the first 17 years of the 21st century.

Planning permission was granted for the School Chapel, the old wooden Gymnasium, the Woodwork Rooms, and the old Chemistry Laboratory and preparation rooms to be demolished, and this took place in September 2017, aimed at a large redevelopment of the whole site to be called Kings Crescent. The foundation stone of the Chapel was taken away for possible future display. Photographs of the original and completed School Chapels, the Wooden Gymnasium, and the Woodwork Rooms are in the St. Helen's House Gallery.

== Overton Hall (1939–1940) and Amber Valley Camp (1940–1945) ==
A decision was made on 2 September 1939 for the pupils and staff of Derby School to be evacuated immediately away from the town of Derby due to its proximity of the then Derby Electricity Power Station in Full Street in the centre of Derby. This was followed on the following day by the declaration of war on Sunday 3 September 1939. As a temporary measure from September 1939 until June 1940 they first went to Overton Hall in Ashover near Matlock.

Once Amber Valley Camp was completed in June 1940 Derby School moved from Overton Hall to the new accommodation at Amber Valley Camp, Woolley Moor some five miles (8 km) away. The boys walked this distance and subsequently, an annual sporting event "The Five Mile Walk" was inaugurated.

Amber Valley Camp was one of the National Camp Corporation premises. In the 1930s this organisation began to set up wooden buildings on sites in the countryside so that urban children could experience Britain’s national surroundings. 31 similar camps were built in England and Wales and 5 in Scotland.

They proved to be useful in the Second World War as evacuation centres and even in some instances as military camps. After the war Derby Corporation Education Committee used Amber Valley Camp for monthly visits by the town’s secondary school children.

The camp was built with six buildings used as dormitories, there were two ablution blocks, a sanatorium, a double staff bungalow (one part housing the Camp Manager - Commander De Denne (RN Retd.) and the Rev Allan Grime and his family occupied the other section). The dining room allowed 300 pupils to take meals. In addition, there were four classrooms in a block and a further hut was the craft centre. Another block housed a physics lab and a chemistry lab and provided an office for Les Bradley – the Headmaster. Classes were also held in the school hall, the Woolley Moor Methodist Chapel and a nearby public house. The dormitories were called after Derbyshire places, including Wingfield, Melandra, Eyam, Dovedale, Cromford and Bakewell. The only building now left at Amber Valley is the old dining room, which is now the headquarters of the Ogston Sailing Club.

=== Annual reunion at Amber Valley Camp site ===
For many years the Old Derbeian Society has organised an annual reunion of old Amber Valley pupils and other Old Derbeians, with their wives, partners and friends in June. The Ogston Sailing Club allows the society to use their clubhouse, which used to house the school dining room, the masters' common room, and the school tuck-shop.

== Return to St Helen's House (1945–1966) ==
St Helen’s House and the adjoining building known as 'B' Block, also as the Pearson Building, in King Street had been used by Ordnance Survey staff during World War II. In 1945 this organisation vacated the buildings including Big School (the large school assembly hall) and allowed Derby School to return to its home after five years at the beginning of September at the commencement of the Autumn term of 1945. Derby School began its final period here of just over two decades before moving finally on to the Littleover site in 1966.

In 1944, the school (owned by Derby Corporation as a result of its 1554 Queen Ann Royal Charter) accepted financial support from Derbyshire County Council and became one of four single-sex grammar schools in Derby within the tripartite system established by the Education Act 1944, known as the Butler Act, when all secondary education became free to all pupils. The other three were Bemrose School (boys), Homelands Girls Grammar School (girls) and Parkfield Cedars Grammar School for Girls.

The St Helen's House complex consisted of the house ('A'-block), which contained classrooms and offices; an attached annexe known as the Pearson Building ('B' Block), which held most of the classrooms on the ground and second floor plus on the first floor 'Big School', the school's large assembly hall complete with stage; there used to be a free standing school chapel, which was demolished in September 2017 to make way for new housing development called Kings Terrace; plus a separate building in red brick which housed the Chemistry Department approached through the cloisters between the rear of 'B' Block and the Laboratory. In this corner of the buildings was the Headmaster's House built around the late 1880s. When the house became vacant and following the development of the OTC/JTC/CCF this was converted into an armoury containing scores of weapons - dozens of Lee–Enfield .303 rifles, several .303 Bren Guns with tripods, a couple of handheld Sten guns and revolvers. No live ammunition was stored. In the rear playground, there were then several single-storey prefabricated wooden buildings which contained the woodworking classroom, gymnasium, changing rooms and shower facilities, the reason they were built of wood was because the main GNR / LNER railway lines from Ilkeston and Nottingham to Derby Friargate Railway Station went underneath in a 'cut and cover' tunnel. Approached off Edward Street there was a smaller annexe which used to be part of a Junior School where the refectory dining room was along with some classrooms.

In the years leading up to 1966, there was also further accommodation, in the school buildings on Chapel Street, a site now occupied by a multi-storey carpark.

Old boys Pete Skirrow and Dave Goodwin recorded a film of St Helen’s House in 2012. It shows the house as it is being redeveloped but affords a rare and poignant insight into the school as it was in the 1960s.

=== Playing field, sports ground and rowing club ===
All school sports were played at Parker's Piece. It used to be believed that it was named after a sports ground at Cambridge University, but research in 2016 amongst documents in the Derbyshire Records Office has identified that an original occupant of this land a Mr Joseph Parker sold the land to Derby School. This a 6-acre (24,000 m^{2}) ground is three-quarters of a mile from the school and situated on City Road. Near to the entrance from City Road there had been built a wooden Sport's Pavilion which included changing facilities and toilets. This wooden pavilion is still in existence in the 21st century.

The river Derwent ran parallel to City Road and formed one of the boundaries. A large wooden structured boathouse was built almost right up to the boundary of the Great Northern Railway line in 1877 (later known as the LNER railway) which ran on a brick arched viaduct. A metal arched bridge built by Handyside of Derby Andrew Handyside and Company allowed this railway line to cross the river Derwent. Boats and oars were stored on the ground floor, and the changing and locker rooms were up an outside a wooden staircase. This boathouse was also the headquarters of the Derby Rowing Club and also the Derby School Rowing Club premises. Derby School boat club began in 1862 and was closed down in 1889. Derby School Rowing Club was reborn in 1931 and details are included in a book entitled 1879 - 1979 The First Hundred Years pages 61 – 63.

The first Captain of Boats recorded in Tacchella's Register was appointed in 1862. The first reference to the Derby Grammar School Boat Club appears in an advertisement in the Derby Mercury of 3 June 1863, which mentions the Rev. T.H.L. Leary, Headmaster at the time, providing trophies for competition amongst boys at the school at the forthcoming regatta. The original Derby School boathouse was built just upstream of the Derwent Rowing Club's own Club House on the west side of the river Derwent. The school is recorded as having won the Public Schools Challenge Cup at Henley Royal Regatta in 1884, beating Hertford School and Magdalene College School, Oxford 'Easily'. The school boat club was closed shortly after the death in 1889 of the headmaster, the Rev. Walter Clark. For 41 years no rowing activities took place at the school. It is recorded there was conflict within the school that rowing was attracting more members than the cricket club was prepared to allow and therefore responsible for bringing pressure to bear which resulted in the demise of rowing.

The school rowing club was reborn in 1931 owing much to two senior members of the Derby Rowing Club, Tom Ison and Secretary Harry Ellis, and the wholehearted support of the then Headmaster, Mr. T.J.P. York. This time they became an integral part of the Derby Rowing Club and shared their club house which was situated on land adjoining Parker's Piece and the GNR (later the LNER) railway line to Friargate Railway Station. The Derby School Rowing Club continued until the start of World War II when it was closed for the duration of the War. In September 1945 it started once again after the masters and boys returned from five years of evacuation to Overton Hall and Amber Valley Camp.

Many of the older large clinker built 'fours' and 'pairs' boats being housed under the railway arches of the LNER railway which ran alongside the sports ground. In addition on Parker's Piece, there were two football pitches in winter and a cricket square for summer. The sports ground was large enough for a 400-yard athletic track to be laid out for use during the summer term along with facilities for long and high jumps.

A new clubhouse was built and completed in 1963 on the opposite bank of the river Derwent, but slightly further upstream. During the coldest weather for centuries the river Derwent in January 1963 froze over and all equipment, including boats, seats, timber, tools and other paraphernalia, was carried over to the other side across the thick ice.

=== Fives Court ===
St Helen's House was notable for its Fives Court, since demolished, this was in the grounds in front of the Pearson Building also known as 'B'-block and adjacent to the pavement in King Street. Records show that the Fives Court was built using the original foundations of the first chapel tin tabernacle built prior to the erection of the brick and tile chapel. Since demolished in September 2017 to make way for new housing development called Kings Crescent.

When Derby School moved out of the centre of Derby to the new school built at Moorway Lane, in Littleover in September 1966, they also included in the new build three purpose 'Fives Courts'. As recently as 2016 these courts were improved by being made weather proof by having roofs placed over them.

Leading from 'Big School' at the opposite end from the purpose made stage was a major fire escape. In years gone by it was well known for pupils to prove their mettle by sliding down the metal roof of the fire escape.

=== Football team ===
Derby School had a significant football team in the early 1870s, notable for its passing tactics. A double pass is reported from Derby school against Nottingham Forest in March 1872, the first of which is irrefutably a short pass: "Mr Absey dribbling the ball half the length of the field delivered it to Wallis, who kicking it cleverly in front of the goal, sent it to the captain who drove it at once between the Nottingham posts". In February 1873 the following passing movement is also described: "[The ball was] crossed by C Garrard and cleverly put through by H. Sleigh."

=== Honours Boards in Big School ===
As the many years passed of the school's occupation of St. Helen's House and the Pearson Building many scholars achieved high honours as they progressed with their education. These were all recorded for posterity by being placed onto 'Honours Boards' which graced the pillars between each of the long 12 feet high windows of 'Big School'. When the school moved in 1966 to the brand new Moorway Lane School complex in Littleover these Honours Boards were taken down and refixed within the new school hall along with other artefacts such as war memorial plaques removed from the chapel in the grounds of St. Helen's House. It is recorded that this was due entirely to the efforts made by Mr Norman Elliott, the then head master of the school.

In 2011 an enormous rebuilding programme was commenced by the Derby City Council Education Department of Moorway Lane school complex which is now called the Derby Moor Community Sports College and thanks to negotiations made by the Old Derbeian Society these Boards have been taken down professionally and are now stored safely and securely awaiting such time as Derby Grammar School can allocate a suitable position for their re-erection in future years.

=== Old Derbeian War Memorial ===
In 1921 a war memorial was erected in front of St. Helen's House in remembrance of the 69 old boys of the school killed during the First World War, in the shape of an obelisk. This was designed by Sir Reginald Blomfield and the cost of around £650 was raised by subscriptions from staff, boys, and the public. The memorial was unveiled on 11 November 1921 by Old Derbeian Lt. Col. C. A. Lewis and dedicated by Charles Abraham, Bishop of Derby. The names of 48 old boys of the school killed during the Second World War were added to the memorial after the end of that war. (Note: Further details on the Old Derbeian War Memorial are available on the UK National Inventory of War Memorials (UKNIWM), maintained by the Imperial War Museum. The entry number within the UKNIWM is 14198. The obelisk carries 69 names from the First World War and 48 names from the Second World War, in alphabetical order.)

When Derby School left St. Helen's House in 1966, the war memorial was moved to the new Moorway Lane site in Littleover. When Derby School was closed in 1989, the memorial was again moved back to St. Helen's House, where it now stands some 15 metres north of its original site. In 1992, the Old Derbeian Society wS awarded Derby City Council's Civic Award Trophy for its efforts to restore the monument and return it to St. Helen's House.

To mark the centenary of the beginning of the First World War on 4 August 2014, the Old Derbeian Society arranged for research to be undertaken into the many names of old boys who had served in the two world wars. Beside including the names, ranks, military service numbers (69 for the First World War and 48 for the Second, 117 in total), details have also been collected of the servicemen's military medal awards, local press reports, and details of where each man is buried or remembered officially. This collection has been assembled into three large volumes, and these were handed to the President of the Old Derbeian Society on 9 November 2014, at the conclusion of the Remembrance Day Service held that year, to be held within the Society's archives.

During the Remembrance Sunday Services held in both 2016 and 2017 special emphasis was made to those who had been killed during both the 'Battles of the Somme' (July to November 1916) and the 'Battle of Passchedaele' (July to November 1917). Special small wooden crosses with poppies naming the fallen were laid into the lawn fronting the obelisk. On Sunday 11 November 2018, a century since the armistice was signed on 11 November 1918, special mention was made that one hundred years had elapsed and the opportunity was taken to plant three small wooden crosses into the lawn in front of the Memorial specially recognising the three fighting services, namely the Royal Navy, the Army and the Royal Air Force (RAF) which was a century old since its formation from the Royal Flying Corps in 1918.

=== The House System and Forms ===
In 1913 the school introduced for the first time "The House System" where all the boys in the school were divided into "houses". with boys allocated into a house based on their surname. Four house names were first proposed: St. Helen's, Chester, Derwent and Darley. However, in December 1913 the house names were altered to Wilson's, Tanner's, School House and Cruikshank's. Slowly as House Masters retired the names were revised. In December 1914 School House became Fullers as there were to be no more boarders; in July 1921 Wilsons became Gatelys; in July 1934 Cruikshanks became Grimes.

Then World War II changed things once again as whilst a good half of the school was evacuated on 2 September 1939 to Overton Hall, many pupils were left behind in Derby due to shortage of room - two houses were created at Overton Hall called Greens and Atkinsons whilst those left back in Derby were called Hastings and Mellings. Then in June 1940 when Amber Valley Camp was finally completed the whole school was reunited, including those from Derby, when they returned to their pre-war houses Gatelys (A to E of alphabet), Tanners (F to K), Fullers (L to R) and Grimes (S to Z). These names were then retained until Derby School closed down in 1989. Research Report from Old Derbeian Society June 2012 and July 2013.

The houses competed annually for the Cock House Trophy, gained by the house with the greatest number of house points which were awarded by masters for academic, social and sporting achievements.

The school was also divided into forms, which were named by a number and the initial of the form master. The number one was eschewed, so boys started in Form 2. The Fifth and Sixth Forms were divided between lower and upper: the complete form numbering system was Form 2, Form 3, Form 4, Lower Fifth, Upper Fifth, Lower Sixth, Upper Sixth. For the academic year 1945-46 for the only time at the St. Helen's House site there was a three form entry intake, but then starting in the academic year 1946-47 it reverted to its normal two form entry.

Lessons were held throughout the school, however each form had an allocated form room in either St. Helen's House or B Block. Every student would have a desk in the form room, where he could keep his books; however, around 1949 lockers started to be provided on the ground floor of B Block.

=== Praeposters and monitors ===
Leadership at the school was in the hands of the masters, but, as with most schools, older pupils were given responsibility and were appointed praepostors, known as props (an appellation still used at Uppingham School and Rugby School) or monitors. The title 'prefect' (Praefectus) was reserved for the Head Master. The praeposters (props) and monitors were responsible for the behaviour of younger boys outside lessons in the halls and grounds of the school and were permitted to punish minor breaches of discipline. Such punishment would consist of requiring the boy to report to the praepostors' or monitors' room, where the punishment would be handed out. One example was to require the boy to put a number of dots - usually four - in each square of an area of a sheet of graph paper - not as violent as the punishments handed out in the Rugby School of Tom Brown's Schooldays. The usual punishment during the late 1950s was to issue 'sides. This was to complete writing upon a nominated subject over several 'sides' of lined paper.

Opposite the school, in a group of three shops, was a sweet shop, which served as the school tuck shop. Also opposite the school was a Chip shop and the Seven Stars, a former coaching inn, which was popular with staff and older pupils. A bakery on the corner of King Street and Edward Street supplied half loaves of bread to pupils at 'break time'. The centre of the loaf was removed and eaten and then the crust was filled with crisps.

In the early 1960s the nearby Lancaster School buildings were absorbed. A daily trek from King Street to Orchard Street for school dinner became part of many routines. There were also teaching rooms there, notably for art and for geography, and a large area devoted to woodwork lessons on the ground floor. It became a place for football in the playground.

=== Conversion to offices ===
In 1965, the St Helen's House building was declared dangerous because of falling tiles and masonry. The school moved to a new site on Moorway Lane, Littleover, in 1966. In 2006 Richard Blunt was granted a 299-year leasehold on the House by Derby City Council. Plans to convert the building into a hotel were scrapped following the economic downturn and the house was converted into offices instead, the first company taking possession in 2013.

== Littleover (1966–1989) ==
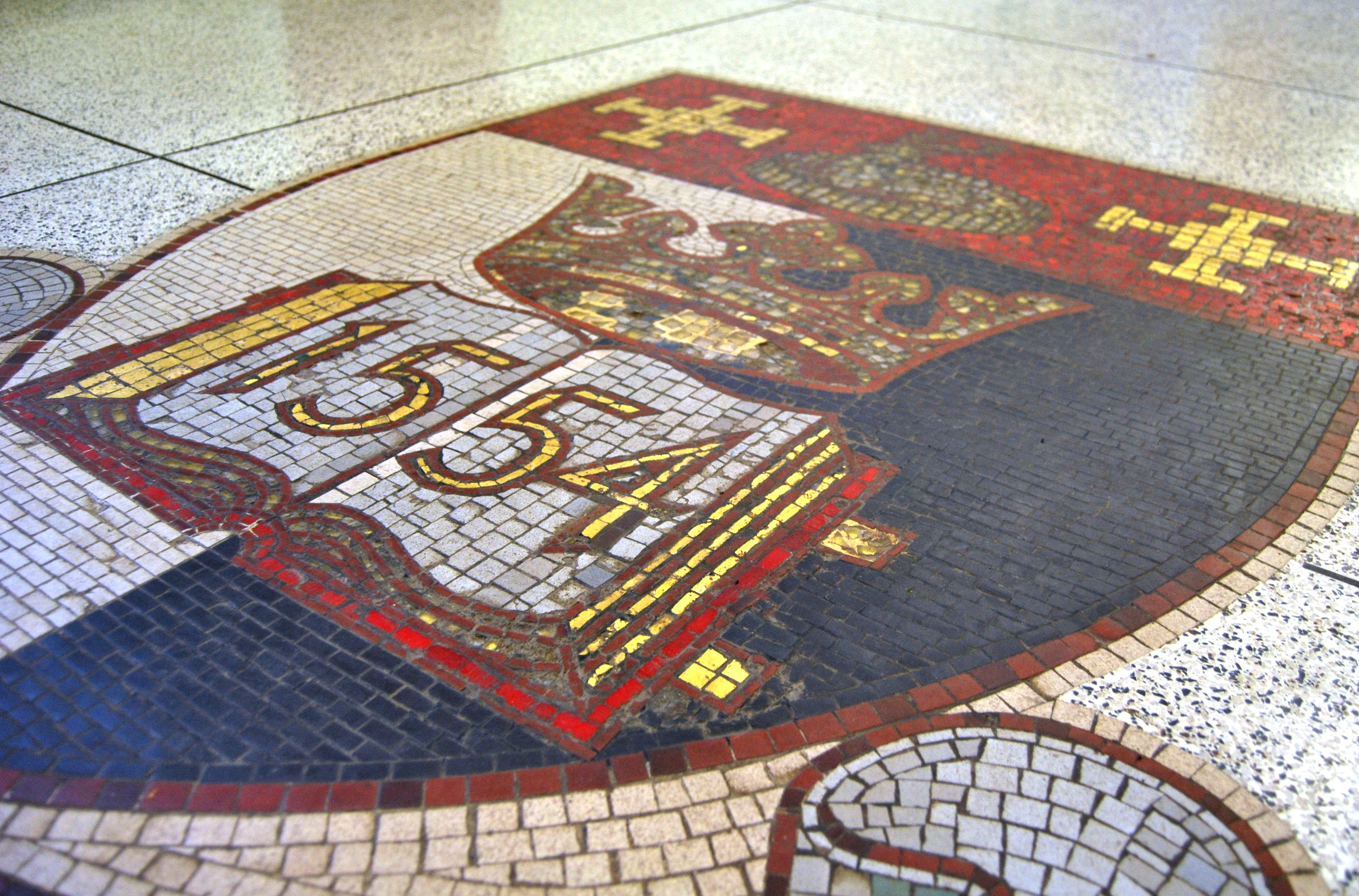
Derby School Mosaic in Entrance Hall

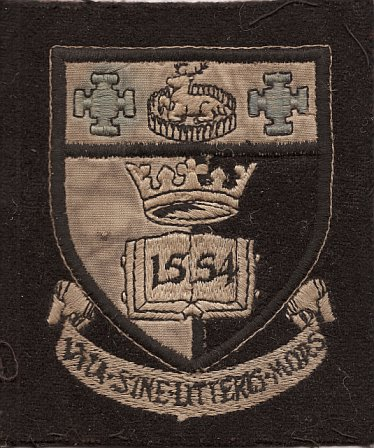
Blazer Badge circa 1968. Used.

The first headmaster, 'Norman' Elliott and deputy headmaster W. O. Butler of Derby School at Moorway Lane, Littleover both transferred from the St Helen's House site. Mr Elliott retired in 1979 and died in late July 2012.

On arrival at the new school site in 1966, its playing fields were found to be still full of stones, so in the beginning the boys were bussed across town to Parker’s Piece, off City Road at Chester Green, for sports.

The traditions of the older boys, uprooted from St Helen's House, influenced the new boys. The running of the school was still steeped in history, with praepostors and monitors, and with the houses still competing for the Cock House trophy. Latin remained an important subject. Schoolmasters still dressed in suits, with gowns and mortar boards, and used corporal punishment, sometimes publicly after lessons. There was a strict dress code, and sixth formers could wear boaters on summer days. Lockers did not need locks. Older boys expected respect and obedience from younger boys, although not fagging. Praeposters and monitors could administer punishment. They also had their own rooms, and later the use of the Pavilion, off limits to masters and the lower forms. The new school had purpose-built Fives courts, where gloved fights between boys with grudges were tolerated as a gentlemanly way of settling disputes.

The school continued as a single-sex grammar school until 1972, when it was taken over as a maintained school by Derbyshire County Council, which converted it into a co-educational comprehensive school and greatly increased its size, in buildings and pupils. At this point, it was still Derby School. However, in 1989 the County Council decided to close Derby School and to make the headmaster redundant. A new school fully comprehensive and co-educational was created called Derby Moor Community School with a new head and governing body but with many of the old school's staff and students. It was later known as the Derby Moor Community Sports College Trust, still at the Moorway Lane site. In terms of legal identity, this was not the same school, but in some ways it was its successor. Changes in education in the early 21st century saw a further development in 2017 when the school on the site became the Derby Moor Academy.

Following the death of a much respected master, Edward William Gillard MBE (1893–1965), who had been a master at Derby School from 1922 to 1965, the Old Derbeian Society arranged for a painting to be made of him by a Nottingham artist, John R. Townsend, and this was presented to Derby School. After the school was closed down, this was re-presented to the new Derby Grammar School and hangs in the Library there. At the same time, the OD Society also arrangedvfor a group of six maple trees to be planted to the left of the then new school main entrance. The name agreed was The Gillard Copse, which was first planted with new trees in early 1968 and in July 1968 was formally named by the then Bishop of Derby.

The entrance hall to the Derwent building, at the "old" Derby School site, features a floor mosaic depicting the Derby School badge. However, in October 2010 a huge redevelopment scheme began to expand the college and buildings to connect the two parts of the college. The proposed removal of the mosaic to another part of the building was found impractical. It was covered in situ with tiles and by October 2015 the gold paint used in the mosaic work was showing serious deterioration and starting to affect the floor detrimentally.

== School Cadet Corps (1862–1973) ==
In 1860 a general call was made throughout the country for public schools and grammar schools to create and found their own corps. The school was the tenth such Officers Training Corps (OTC) to be created. In Tacchella's The Derby School Register, 1570-1901 published in 1902, the names of the Captains of the Corps from 1862 to 1901 are listed. An entry in Derb School Fasci 1867 and 1868 (which was the forerunner of The Derbeian) contains the following:

A very desirable change has been made in the uniform of the Corps; for the Garabaldi Jackets and white flannel Trowsers, scarlet Tunics and blue serge Trowsers have been substituted.

In September 2015 Andrew Polkey (a former pupil from 1961-1966) published a first edition of the book entitled A History of Derby School Cadet Corps - 1862 to 1973. Following the discovery of more historic details and newly found black-and-white photographs, a second edition was published in November 2016.

=== Officers Training Corps ===
From early in the 20th century to the commencement of the Second World War, the school corps was called an Officers Training Corps (OTC). This had its own OTC Band.

=== Junior Training Corps ===
During the early 1940s, OTCs in British public and grammar schools were renamed 'Junior Training Corps' (JTC). The JTC was popular with senior boys (Lower and Upper Fifth plus Sixth forms) with many going for the two weeks summer camp under canvas to places such as Aldershot and Catterick Army depots.

One of the benefits of being a member of the school's JTC and later Combined Cadet Force was that Derby School pupils were allowed to undertake Cert.'A' training in all military matters, and in Derby this meant that final exams were held at The Barracks at Sinfin in Derby, the home of the Sherwood Foresters Regiment. Passing out with a Cert.'A' meant that when the boys were later called up to undertake their National Service, they were one step ahead of the majority of young men.

On returning to the St. Helen's House site in September 1945 the JTC continued operations including parades immediately using the main playground in front of 'B' Block, the one behind the School Chapel and the pre-war armory in the cloisters (near to the Chemistry Laboratory) to store their weapons. The building containing the armory had been the Headmaster's house built at the end of the 19th century in 1891, along with the cloisters and Chemistry Laboratory. From 1945 to 1951 the School Band was not reformed.

The cadets went to the Trent Lock .303 Shooting Range near Long Eaton and to the .22 small arms range at Becket Street Drill Hall Indoor Rifle Range, for rifle practice.

=== Combined Cadet Force ===
Early in 1949, Derby School's JTC was amalgamated into the Combined Cadet Force (CCF). This had a British Army section and a Royal Air Force section, and around 1951 the band section Military band made up of members of both sections. was formed. A parade was held on Friday afternoons: members of the JTC and then the CCF would come to school in their corps uniforms, wearing berets and boots. In addition, JTC and CCF pupils stayed on after school on Monday afternoons to undertake other instruction in civilian clothes. In 1966, the CCF transferred to the new school site at Moorway Lane in Littleover and survived until it was disbanded in 1973, under the last Commanding Officer (CO) Flight Lieutenant Mick Foulkes, who was a Chemistry Master at the school. He was senior officer in the RAF section but also responsible for the whole Cadet Corps, including the Army section, band section, and RAF section.

=== History of Derby School Cadet Corps 1862 - 1973 ===
In order to commemorate the beginning of World War I a century before in 1914 the Old Derbeian Society decided for 2014 that it would be a useful target if two matters were developed:

1. A full research should be undertaken into all the names engraved upon the War Memorial situated in front of St. Helen's House; this was achieved in 2014.

2. A full history of the School's Cadet Corps history should be undertaken. This was duly completed by Andrew Polkey (Assistant OD Society Archivist). Its title is A History of the Derby School Cadet Corps - 1862 to 1973.

This resulted at the November 2014 Remembrance Sunday Service with the presentation of the completed Study from the Chairman of the OD Society to the President at that time, Mr A. Russell Thomas M.P.S. In addition, an Old Derbeian Andrew Polkey (1961–1966) published a book entitled A History of Derby School Cadet Corps 1862 - 1973, ISBN 978-1-85818-700-6. This was popular and within 18 months meant a second and enlarged edition was published in 2016 containing previously unseen B&W photographs and additional information and facts within the text.

== School motto ==
The school motto, Vita Sine Literis Mors, is a taken from letter number 82 in Seneca the Younger's Epistulae morales ad Lucilium -

Vita Hominis sine litteris mors est, et hominis vivi sepultura.

(Life without learning is death, and the funeral of a living man).

This motto is shared with -

- Adelphi University in Nassau County, New York
- Manning's High School, an 18th-century foundation in Jamaica
- The new Derby Grammar School

A variation of the legend of the motto, forming the school badge, was laid in black and white into a coloured mosaic at the entrance of the new Moorway Lane School in 1966. It said "Vita Sine Litteris Mors"

== School hymn ==
The school hymn, Lift Up Your Hearts!, was given a musical setting in 1916 by Walter Greatorex, an old boy of the school.

== School histories ==
The Derby School Register, 1570-1901

Several people connected to the school have been written about aspects of the school's history. The Derby School Register, 1570-1901, was published in 1902, edited by Benjamin Tacchella, a modern languages master at the school. In June 1953 Colin S. Bell, an Old Derbeian, wrote a short history of the school for the period until 1900. A 34-page document, entitled Derby School - A Short History 1554 - May 21st 1954, was written by George P. Gollin and Roy Christian (both ODs)and appeared in separate sections within the Derbyshire Advertiser local newspaper during 1954 in the lead up to the quatercentenary (400 years) celebrations of the school's refounding, with the date of the charter being 21 May 1554. It was decided to amalgamate each separate section into one publication and was published in May 1954. (Note: A complete hard copy of George P. Gollin and Roy Christian's short history was presented to the Old Derbeian Society and now resides in the library of the Derby Grammar School)

== The Derbeian magazine ==
Bound copies of The Derbeian (the school's in-house magazine, usually published each term, starting in July 1889 until the last publication in 1978 are available at Derby Grammar School (DGS) for research purposes. These consist of over 23 volumes and record in great detail almost 90 years of school activities and the names of every pupil and teacher at St. Helen's House in Derby and at the Moorway Lane site in Littleover, Derby.

== Old Derbeian Society ==
The Old Derbeian Society (ODS) was formed in 1911 allowing all pupils of Derby School, who had left their full-time secondary education, to enroll as members for life. On Saturday 28 October 1911 the President of the OD Society, Dr. R. Laurie, had invited its members to a smoking concert to inaugurate the birth of the society. The full report appears in The Derbeian (the school's magazine) for December 1911 and includes a statement from the Rev. A.C. Knight "that a loyal and patriotic Old Boys' Society (now known as OD Society) would inspire confidence in the town and in this way help the school itself."

The aims and objectives of the Society are threefold: as stated on the Old Derbeian Website;

- To foster the memory of the old Derby School and to support the new Derby Grammar School; also to further the interests of the School's past and present members.
- To keep Old Derbeians in touch with one another and with the School.
- To organise Old Derbeians for social purposes and for the purpose of cricket, football and other games.

A rule of the OD Society states "Any Old Derbeian, any past Head or Teacher of Derby School, also the Head for the time being, any past Head and any past or present Teacher of the Derby Grammar School, shall be entitled to become a member."

In June 2010 the OD Society presented the Alan Sanders Memorial Cup for the first time to the winning team at the resurrected annual cricket match played between the ODS Team and Derby Grammar School First XI team.

Commencing in October 2011 the Society started celebrating the centenary of its founding in October 1911, with a Centenary dinner.

=== Old Derbeians ===
Link to Old Derbiean Society website HERE

=== War Memorial Service of Remembrance ===
A Service of Remembrance takes place annually at the Old Derbeians' War Memorial (known as an obelisk) in front of St Helen's House on each Remembrance Sunday. Wreaths are laid first by the President of the Old Derbeian Society, then the Head of Derby Grammar School, followed by the Head Prefect. Commencing in 2014 when a special service was held that recalled the fact World War I commenced in August 1914.

In addition, after the reading out of all the names of those recorded by a small group of Old Derbeians, the opportunity is taken to give a small address reflecting the current situation. This is followed by the planting of special wooden mini wooden crosses with small poppies into the lawn adjoining the steps of the War Memorial. The Service starts with a Derby Grammar School pupil who plays the "Last Post". Then after the two-minute silence, the same pupil plays the "Reveille", this is followed by a short service which includes the reading out of every Old Derbeian who died and whose name is engraved on the War Memorial. Following extensive research this now includes 70 names for World War I and 49 names for World War II.

== List of masters and headmasters ==
See List of Masters of Derby School.

== St Helen's House gallery ==
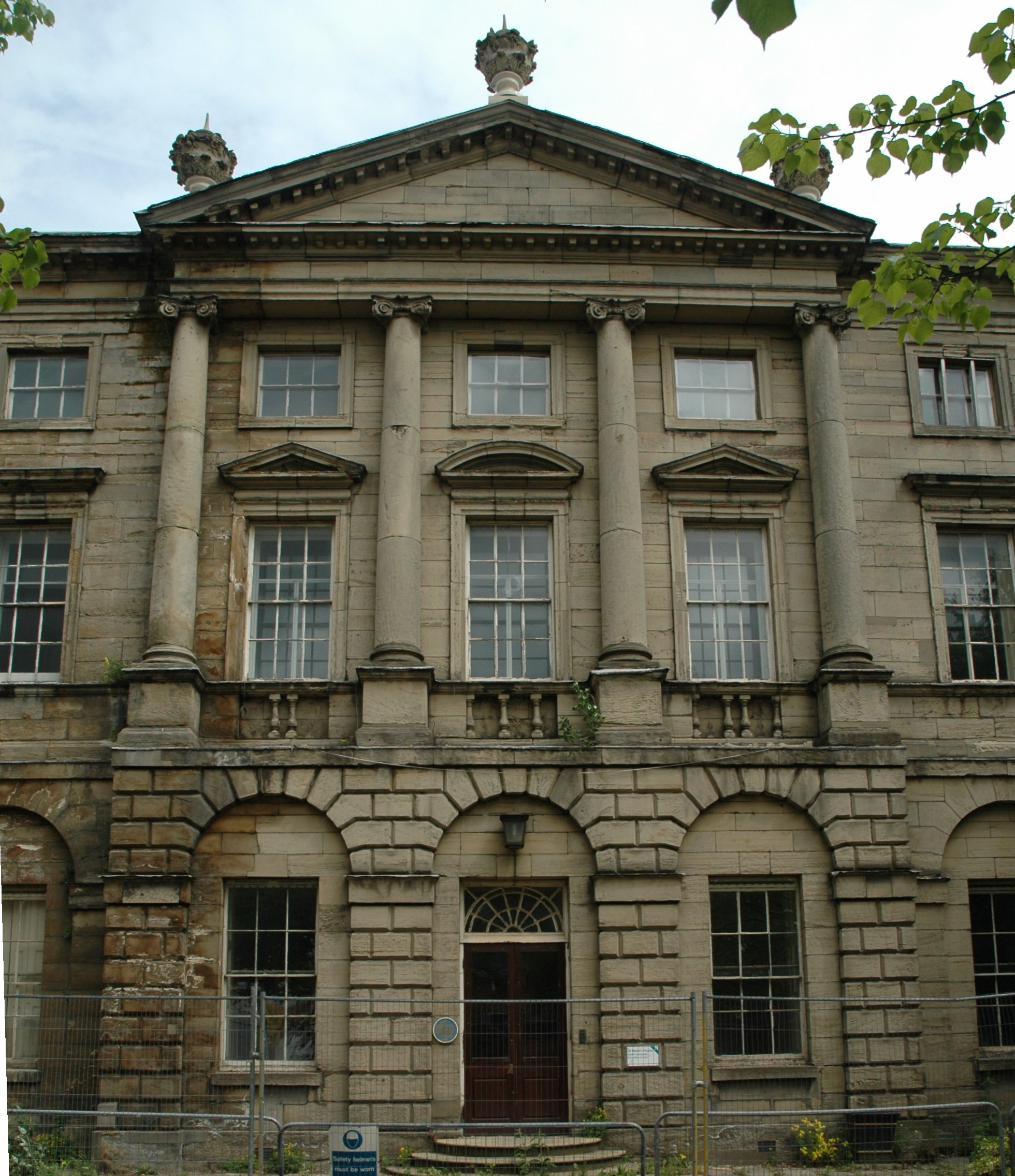
St Helen's House in 2007

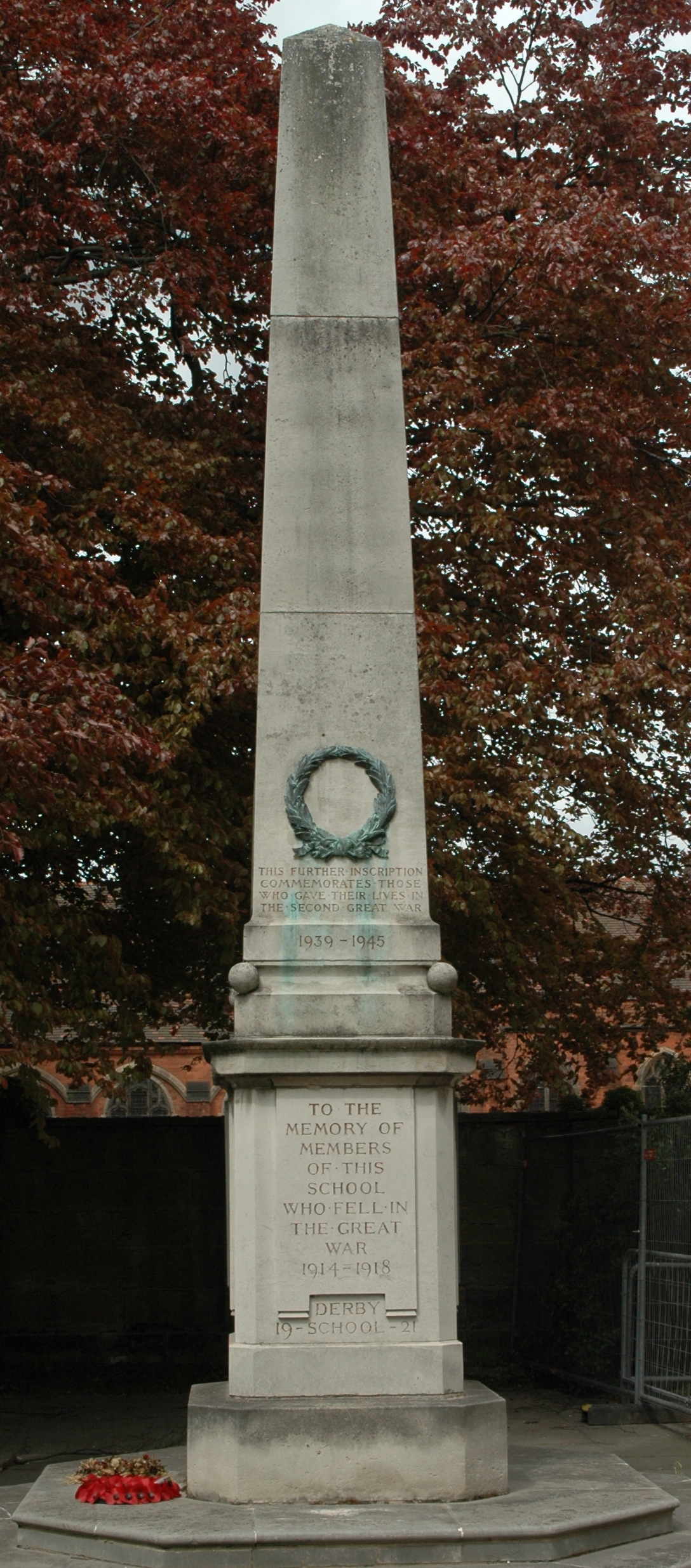
The Old Derbeians' War Memorial

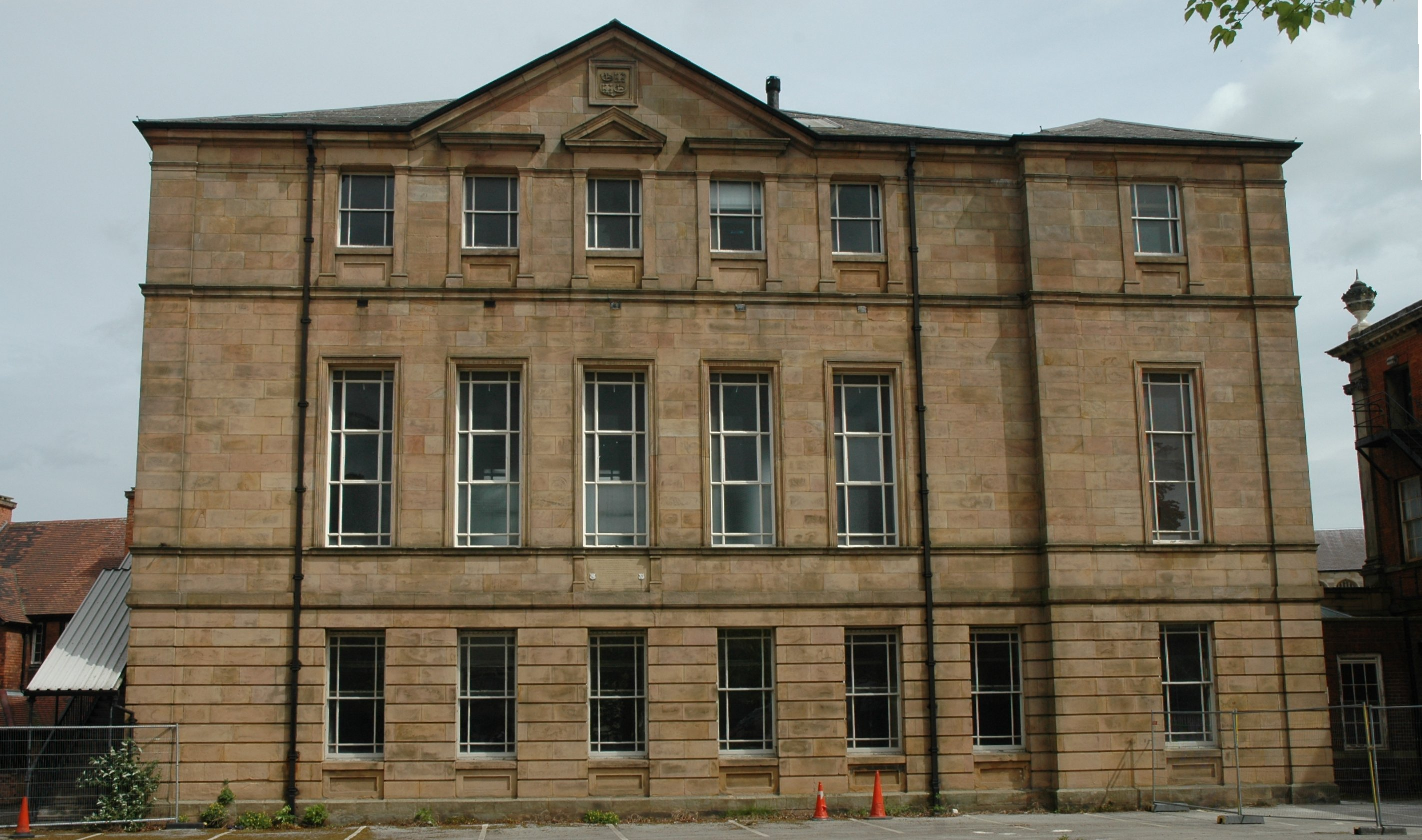
The Pearson Building known as 'B'-Block

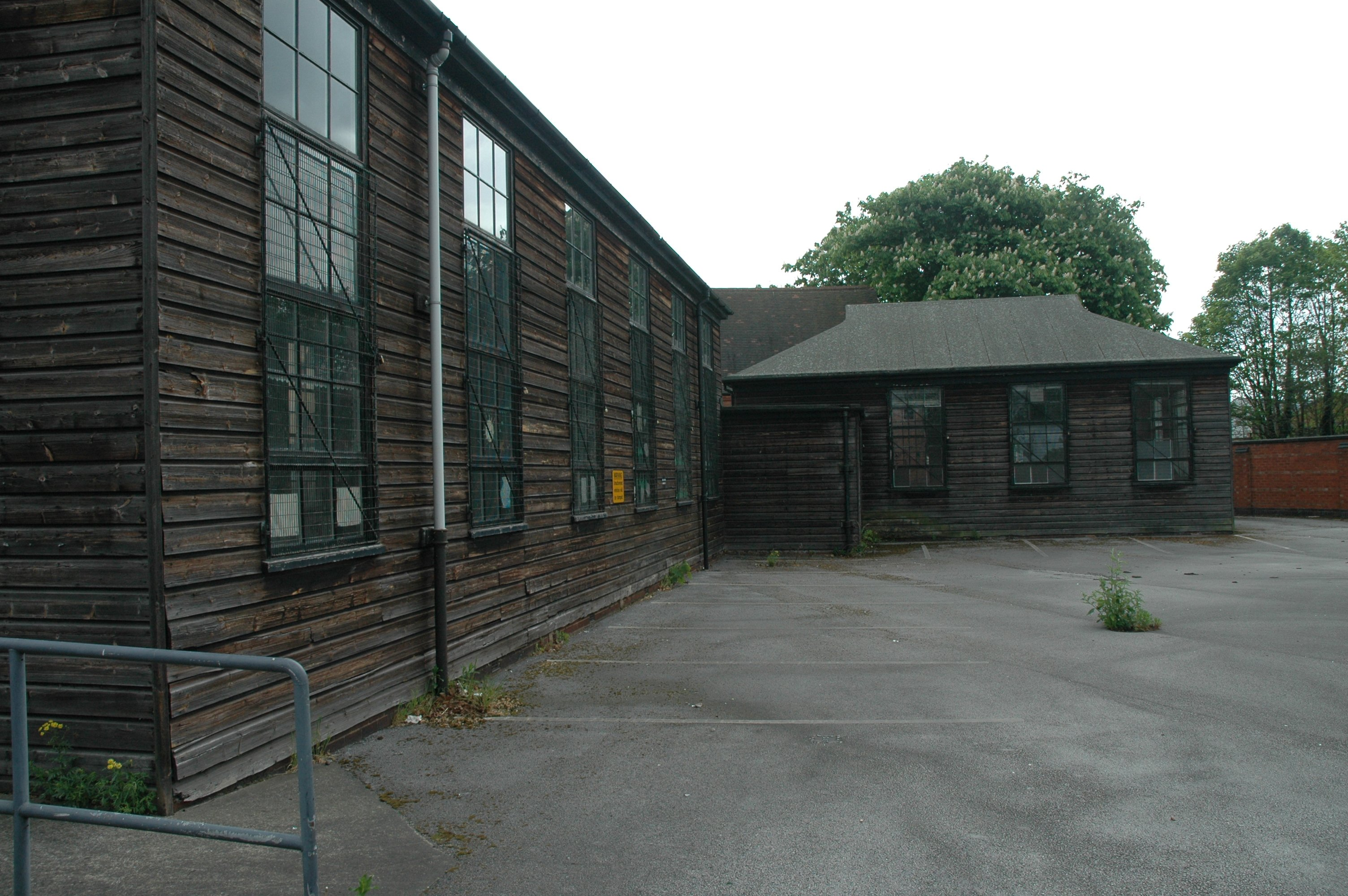
The former gym (left) and workshop (right)
Demolished September 2017

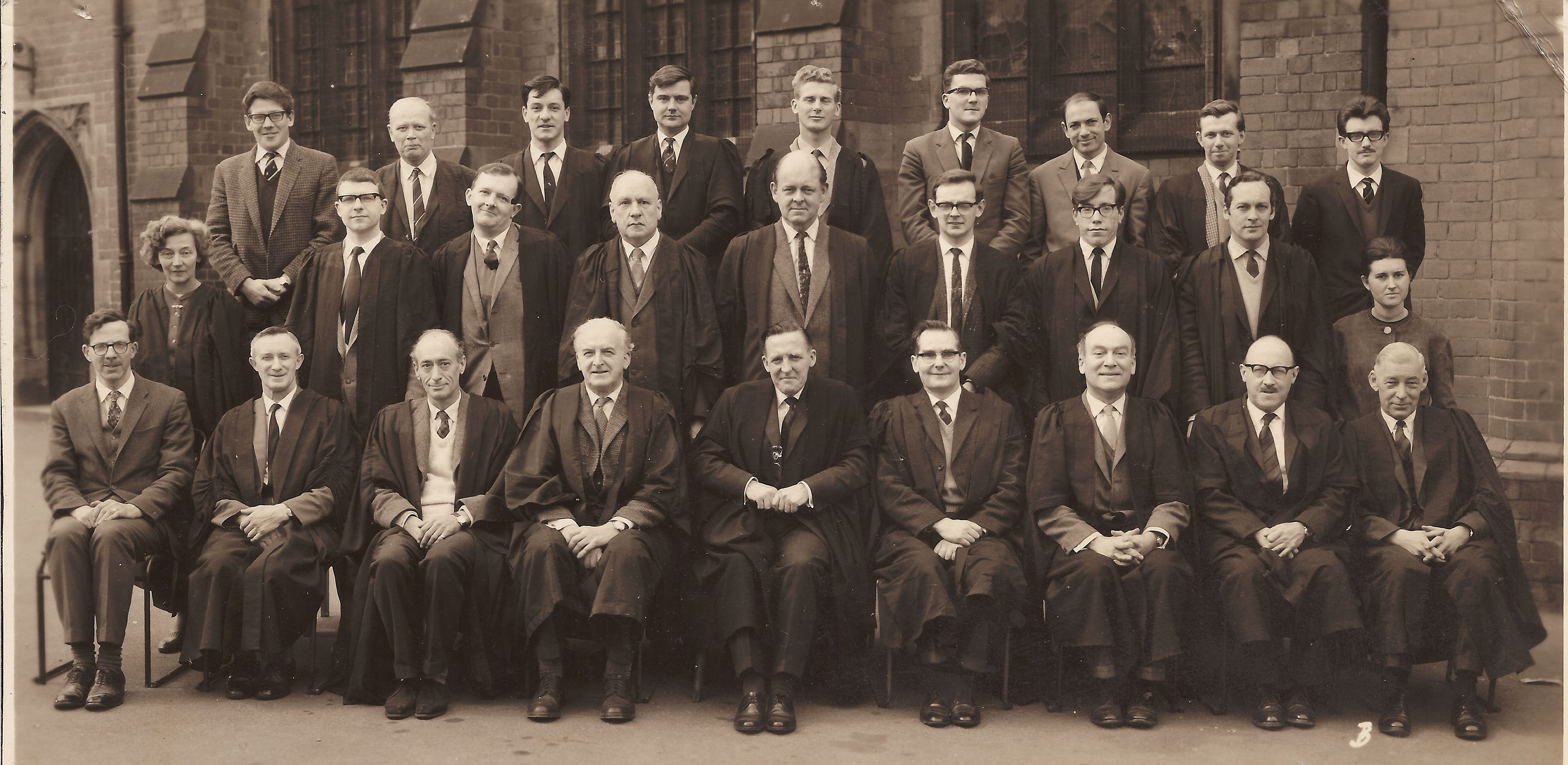
The Masters. circa 1966. The Chapel at St Helen's House in the background

== Derby Grammar School ==
Derby Grammar School, a new school founded in 1994, is an independent school which includes a Junior department. It occupies the 18th-century Rykneld Hall on Rykneld Road in Littleover (previously Rykneld Hospital) and has around 300 pupils. In the academic year 2019-2020 they celebrate their 25th Year since their foundation

With the agreement of the Committee of the Old Derbeian Society, Derby Grammar School has adopted a heraldic badge devised by the Reverend Walter Clark in 1883 for Derby School, which it used until the badge was replaced by a coat of arms granted by the College of Arms in 1952. The 1952 coat of arms fell into disuse when Derby School closed in 1989.

Membership of the Old Derbeian Society was extended in the late 1990s to now be open to all former pupils of the new Derby Grammar School, deemed to be the next generation of Old Derbeians. See Aims and Objectives of OD Society

== See also ==
- List of the oldest schools in the world
