= Noël Tredinnick =

British organist

Dr Noël Harwood Tredinnick BEM FRSCM (born 9 March 1949) is a British composer, organist, orchestrator and conductor. He was awarded a Lambeth DMus degree in March 2002, and a FRSCM in May 2009. In Queen Elizabeth's Birthday Honours, bestowed in 2021, he received a British Empire Medal for life-long services to Church Music and Music Education. Tredinnick has toured extensively in Europe, the US, Australia and South Africa as both lecturer and conductor.

He is noted for his many contributions to several hymnals, his regular appearances on the BBC's Songs of Praise, presenting a pair of weekly radio programmes All Souls in Praise which broadcast on Premier Christian Radio, and for his long service (50 years) teaching at London's Guildhall School of Music and Drama. He is the founder and Emeritus Conductor of All Souls Orchestra which performs annually at the Royal Albert Hall and throughout the UK under the banner of "Prom Praise" and "Prom Praise for Schools" (PP4S).

Tredinnick's organ works have been performed by several notable players, including George Thalben-Ball, Nicolas Kynaston, David Briggs, Jeremy Filsell, Stephen Disley, Jonathan Rennert, David Goode, and Gerard Brooks.

== Current Positions ==
He is a Professor of conducting, orchestration and academic studies at the Guildhall School of Music and Drama and has been awarded the title of Emeritus Conductor of the All Souls Orchestra, in recognition of his pioneering legacy in directing Christian musical worship around the world. He continues to conduct the orchestra in tours of the UK and around the world, in partnership with his successor, Michael Andrews.

Dr Tredinnick currently serves as Music Leader at St Paul's Church, Herne Hill, a parish in South East London, since February 2024. Additionally, he has two weekly programmes as a broadcaster on Premier Radio.

Tredinnick's arranging style combines traditional hymns and Christian songs with harmonies from jazz and modernist music, making frequent use of chromaticism and dissonance. His trademark sound is euphoric, uplifting and spontaneous, with an inclusive feel. He is generally regarded as one of the UK's foremost church musicians.

Tredinnick has been involved with the Jubilate Group for many years, which is concerned with updating old-fashioned language in hymnody and for publishing new musical resources for congregations; he is now a Director of the group.

== All Souls Church & Orchestra ==
In December 1971 Tredinnick was appointed Organist and Director of Music at the church of All Souls, Langham Place, in the heart of the West End of London: he retired from leadership in 2019. He founded the All Souls Orchestra on the instruction of the then rector, the hymnwriter Michael Baughen, and has since conducted the orchestra at many Christian events, services and festivals in the UK and internationally. The orchestra is well-known as a distinctive voice in Christian worship, providing uplifting accompaniments to hymns and popular songs as well as performing classical works in a Christian context.

Tredinnick is known for his expansive, expressive and personal style of directing and coaxing, as well as for his persuasive eye-contact and personable manner. He has conducted the orchestra alongside several notable singers and songwriters including Cliff Richard, Keith and Kristyn Getty, and Stuart Townend. The orchestra performed alongside Richard on a BBC Songs of Praise episode entitled "The Gospel According to Cliff".

He continues to work with notable Christian artists, both established and new, including Paul Baloche, Christy Nockels, Matt Redman, Tim Hughes, Graham Kendrick, Ben Cantelon, Noel Robinson, Reuben Morgan of Hillsong, and classical soprano Joanne Lunn.

In July 2019, Tredinnick retired from his positions at All Souls and then given titles of Conductor Laureate of the ASO, and Organist Emeritus of All Souls Church. He was awarded the British Empire Medal (BEM) in the 2021 Birthday Honours for services to church music and music education.

== Other work ==
Tredinnick has released a recording of operatic arias for soprano with Vania Vatralova-Stankov and the Sofia Symphony Orchestra, and a celtic/rock fusion album (Woven Chord) with the band Iona.

His arrangements of traditional hymns continue to be popular in the Christian community, with favourities including his arrangements of 'Londonderry Air' and 'Blaenwern' ('Love Divine All Loves Excelling'). These arrangements use alternative and sometimes surprising chords to adjust the music and emphasise the emotional quality of certain words or themes. He is also the composer of the well-known hymn tune 'Old Yeavering'- written for Michael Perry's 'Like a Mighty River Flowing', and several widely-adopted arrangements of popular hymns including 'A Purple Robe' by Timothy Dudley-Smith.

He is a contributor to the hymn book 'Mission Praise', and was on the music editorial panel for the publications: Hymns for Today's Church, 'Carol Praise' and 'Sing Glory', among others.

Tredinnick was responsible for much of the congregational music at former Archbishop of Canterbury George Carey's enthronement in April 1991 in Canterbury Cathedral. He introduced a more contemporary language to a service, which up to that point, had primarily embraced a more traditional language. Tredinnick believes that new music is the natural result of faith. He has written that "Creativity goes hand in hand with an alive experience of the Lord, as Christians express their own love and share their faith in words."

== Works ==
=== Organ ===
- Brief Encounters
- Side by side
- Come forth with joy

=== Hymnody ===
- Argent
- Come Rejoice
- Enigma
- God of Unchanging Grace
- God Whose Love is Everywhere
- Gracious God
- Jubilate Deo
- Old Yeavering
- Revelation
- Victor's Crown
- Whitsun Psalm

== Personal ==
He married to Fiona (nee Couper-Johnston) in July 1976; and together they have a daughter Isabel (born 1983) and a son James (born 1994). To date, also two grandchildren: Leo Collier and Grace Tredinnick.

== Partial discography ==
- (All Souls Orchestra) (2018). Prom Praise: Christmas Festival conducted by Noël Tredinnick and Michael Andrews.
- Matt Redman; Christy Nockels; et al. (All Souls Orchestra) (2015). Prom Praise: Loves Excelling. conducted by Noël Tredinnick.
- Paul Baloche; Graham Kendrick; Martin Smith; et al. (All Souls Orchestra) (2014). Prom Praise: Majesty. conducted by Noël Tredinnick.
- Keith and Kristyn Getty; Graham Kendrick; Jonathan Veira; et al. (All Souls Orchestra) (2012). Prom Praise: 40th Anniversary. conducted by Noël Tredinnick.
- Beverley Trotman, Joanne Lunn, Grace Yeo et al. (All Souls Orchestra) (2010). Prom Praise – How Great Thou Art.
- Vania Vatralova-Stankov; et al. (Sofia Symphony Orchestra) (2009). Operatic Favourites. conducted by Noël Tredinnick.
- Sarah Stroh, Doug Walker, and Gerard Brooks et al. (All Souls Orchestra) (2005). Prom Praise: Moved by Compassion. conducted by Noël Tredinnick.
- Graham Kendrick; Cliff Richard; et al. (All Souls Orchestra) (1989). The Kendrick Collection. conducted by Noël Tredinnick.
