= Hymns of Universal Praise =

Chinese Christian hymnal

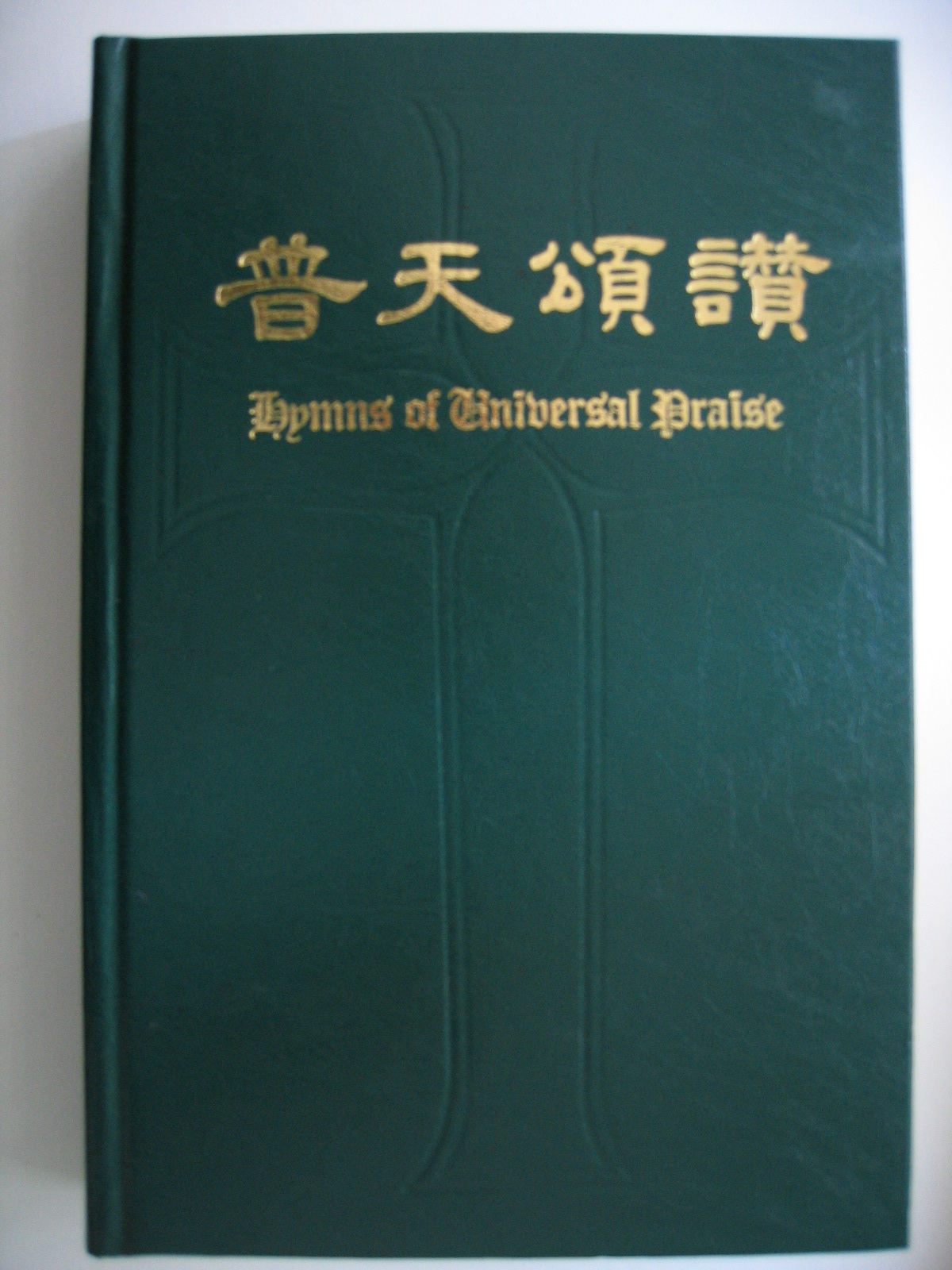
Front cover of the 1977 version

Hymns of Universal Praise (traditional Chinese: 普天頌讚; simplified Chinese: 普天颂赞; pinyin: Pǔtiān Sòngzàn), also known as the HUP, a Chinese hymnal published in 1936, is considered to be an ecumenical attempt at Chinese hymnology from the early twentieth century. According to the Hong Kong hymnologist Andrew Leung, the first edition, HUP1936, established the foundation of Chinese hymnody and is now set as a model of Chinese hymnology.

== Background ==
As the American musicologist Andrew Granade commented, the creation of HUP1936 was due to missionaries, who anticipated in the flourishing of churches in China, and the converts, who hoped the worship music matched with their experiences. HUP1936 was co-edited by six different denominations, including the Church of Christ in China (中華基督教會), the China-based Anglican Church (中華聖公會), the Methodist Episcopal Church North (美以美會), North China Congregational Church (華北公理會), the East China Baptist Convention (華東浸禮會), and the Methodist Episcopal Church South (監理會). The initiation of such collaboration was indirectly prompted by the 1910 World Missionary Conference taking place in Edinburgh. After the suggestion of ecumenical movement in the conference, follow-up meetings took place in major cities such as Guangzhou, Shanghai, and Beijing. All of these meetings proposed a standardised hymnal for the use of all of China. Since then, HUP has been edited twice, including the first edition in 1977 and the second in 2006. Below is the summary of the differences in the selection of hymns in these three versions:

Version	Total No. of Hymns	Translation from Western Hymns	Chinese Tunes
HUP1936	512	452	72
HUP1977	626	561	65
HUP2006	775	695	80

Diagram 1 The Type of Hymns in Different Versions of HUP

To ensure that HUP1936 was a Chinese hymnal, the hymnal committee, led by Timothy Ting-Fang Liu (1891–1947, (劉廷芳), the dean of the school of religious studies at Yenching University, requested that HUP1936 should contain at least 10% of Chinese tunes. To collect Chinese tunes for HUP, in 1934, a competition was opened for composers to write new hymn tune or to suggest a Chinese hymn tune. Around 500 tunes had been submitted, but most of them were not suitable to be used. A few were selected by Bliss Wiant (1895–1975), the American missiologist and musicologist who was teaching at Yenching at that time and was harmonised by him. T. C. Chao (1888–1979), a professor of religious philosophy at Yenching University, had contributed eight out of the seventy-two hymn tunes. The fast-moving sales of the hymnal proved it a huge success. The first 114,000 copies were sold out within a month of its release in March 1936, and the accumulated sales number was up to 442,000 in 1949.

The second edition, HUP1977, was published toward the end of the Cultural Revolution when churches in China mostly stopped operating. The editing process of HUP1977 started from 1969 and was initiated by the Chinese Christian Literature Council (CCLC) based in Hong Kong, who published both the second and the third edition. The CCLC invited the following denominations to involve in the editorial process: the Hong Kong Council of the Church of Christ in China (HKCCCC), the Hong Kong–based Anglican Church (香港聖公會), the Wesleyan Church (中華基督教循道公會), the Methodist Church (衛理公會), and the Swatow Baptist Church (潮語浸信會). The editorial board was led by Wang Yongxi (黃永熙), a musicologist trained in the Chinese University of Hong Kong. Only four members, Dr Francis P. Jones, Dr Bliss Wiant, Rev Earle H. Ballou, and Dr Li Pao-Chen who were in the original committee of HUP1936 stayed as consultants.

The third edition, HUP2006, was coordinated by Angela Tam (譚靜芝), a music student of Wang Yongxi and the former director of the sacred music department in the Alliance Theological Seminary in Hong Kong. Again, several denominations joined the ecumenical cooperation of creating the Chinese hymnal. Like the first two editions, several denominations, including the Hong Kong–based Anglican Church and Methodist Church, and the HKCCCC. The hymnal's list was not only updated with newer hymns, it also responded to the theology in that era, such as social justice, ecology, and culture and technology.

== See also ==
- The New Chinese Hymnal
- The Canaan Hymns
- List of Chinese hymn books
