= Christopher Idle (hymnwriter) =

British hymnwriter

- Born: September 11, 1938 (age 86)
- Education: Eltham College; St Peter's College, Oxford; Clifton Theological College
- Church: Church of England

Christopher Martin Idle (born 11 September 1938) is a British hymnodist.

== Life ==
Idle was born in Bromley, Kent, and was educated at Eltham College. After leaving school, he spent three years in various forms of employment, as well as becoming involved in the Campaign for Nuclear Disarmament. He then studied at St Peter's College, Oxford, graduating in 1962, before undertaking theological training at Clifton Theological College, Bristol.

== Church ministry ==
Idle was made a deacon in the Church of England in 1965, and ordained as a priest the following year. His first curacy was at St Mark's, Barrow-in-Furness, and his second at Christ Church, Camberwell, where he served from 1968 to 1971. In 1971, he became the priest-in-charge of St Matthias', Poplar, and in 1976 became the rector of St Anne's Limehouse. In 1989, he moved to Suffolk and became the rector of seven churches. He returned to London in 1995, joining Christ Church, Camberwell as a part-time Associate Minister in 1997. He is a member of Reform.

== Hymn writing ==
Christopher Idle began writing hymns in the 1960s, while he was a curate in Barrow-in-Furness. His first compositions were "Christ the light who shines unfading" and "Lord, you sometimes speak in wonders".

He was part of a group of composers who formed Jubilate Hymns, along with Michael Baughen, Michael Saward and Michael Perry. He contributed compositions to two early collections by the Jubilate Group, Youth Praise 2 (1969) and Psalm Praise (1973), which features nineteen of his metrical psalms. In 1982, Idle was part of the committee who produced the hymnal Hymns for Today's Church, which featured 35 of his own compositions.

Some of Idle's compositions have been inspired by contemporary events, such as "Let us run with perseverance", written for the 2012 Summer Olympics.

== Notable works ==
=== Hymns ===
Idle has written more than four hundred hymns. Almost every major contemporary hymnal includes texts by Idle. Three collections of his hymns have been published: Light Upon the River (1998), Walking by the River (2008) and Trees Along the River (2018). Light Upon the River is the most substantial collection of his hymns, with 279 compositions. Its name is taken from Idle's hymn "As the light upon the river", written for the Diocese of Southwark's 75th anniversary in 1980. The book launch, held at All Souls, Langham Place, coincided with Idle's 60th birthday. Walking by the River includes 100 new items, and Trees Along the River contains 117 texts, published in September 2018 to mark Idle's 80th birthday.

"Eternal light, shine in my heart" has been included in The Hymnal 1982, Together in Song, and Voices United, while "God, we praise you! God we bless you!" is in Christian Worship, Evangelical Lutheran Hymnary, and Together in Song. Other hymns by Idle include "This earth belongs to God", "Spirit of holiness", "When lawless men succeed", "Freedom and life are ours", "Then I saw a new heaven and earth", and "As sons of the day and daughters of light".

Idle has been part of what has been described as a British "hymn explosion" since World War II.

=== Other works ===
As well as his own compositions, Idle is a respected hymnologist. He has contributed to a number of books, journals and newspapers. He served as editor of News of Hymnody from 1986 to 1992 and 1999 to 2000, and of the Bulletin of the Hymn Society from 2002 to 2003.

Books by Christopher Idle include Hymns in Today's Language? (1982), which discusses the compilation of Hymns for Today's Church, and Exploring Praise! (2007), which comments on the contents of the 2000 hymnal Praise!.
