= Tell Out, My Soul =

Christian hymn written in 1962

- Genre: Hymn
- Written: 1962
- Text: Timothy Dudley-Smith
- Based on: Luke 1:46-55
- Meter: 10.10.10.10
- Melody: "Woodlands" by Walter Greatorex

"Tell Out, My Soul" is a Christian hymn paraphrasing the Magnificat, which was written by Timothy Dudley-Smith in 1962. It is popularly sung to the hymn tune Woodlands composed by Walter Greatorex in 1916.

== History ==
Timothy Dudley-Smith wrote the hymn in May 1961 when he and his wife had just moved into their first house in Blackheath. He was inspired to write the text when he was reading a modern paraphrase of the Magnificat in Luke 1:46–55 in the New English Bible, a translation which begins with the phrase, "Tell out, my soul, the greatness of the Lord". Dudley-Smith, in a 2006 interview, agreed that the hymn was "a significant starting point in terms of his hymns being published".

The hymn has been included in a number of hymnals, among them The New English Hymnal. It has been included in religious radio and television programmes, including Sunday Worship on BBC Radio 4 and Songs of Praise.

In the 2013 survey, "The UK's Top 100 Hymns" conducted by the BBC's Songs of Praise, "Tell Out, My Soul" was voted joint 51st alongside "Nearer, My God, to Thee", Patrick Appleford's "Lord, Jesus Christ" ("Living Lord") and "Give Me Joy In My Heart".

== Musical setting ==
"Tell Out, My Soul"
Extract of Greatorex's hymn tune Woodlands

"Tell Out, My Soul" fits the metre 10.10.10.10, and it was originally published in 1965 in The Anglican Hymn Book, set to the tune Tidings by William Llewellyn. In 1966, the hymn was included in the Evangelical Anglican hymnal Youth Praise, set to a tune by Michael Baughen, Go Forth. The text was later paired with the existing hymn tune Woodlands, which had been composed by Walter Greatorex in 1916 for Henry Montagu Butler's 1881 hymn "Lift Up Your Hearts!". "Tell Out, My Soul" is now most popularly sung to Greatorex's melody.
