= Walter Greatorex =

English composer and musician

Walter Greatorex (30 March 1877 – 29 December 1949) was an English composer and musician. He is probably best remembered for his hymn tune Woodlands which has been used with hymns such as Henry Montagu Butler's Lift Up Your Hearts!, Far round the world thy children sing their song by Basil Joseph Mathews and Timothy Dudley-Smith's Tell Out, My Soul.

== Education ==
Born in Mansfield, Nottinghamshire, the son of a bank manager, from 1888 to 1893 Greatorex was a boy chorister at King's College, Cambridge. He was then educated at Derby School and St John's College, Cambridge. Lift up your hearts to his music became the school hymn of Derby School.

== Career ==
In 1900, he was appointed an assistant music master at Uppingham School. In 1911, he became Director of Music at Gresham's School, Holt, succeeding his fellow Old Derbeian Geoffrey Shaw, and remained at Gresham's for the rest of his working life, until he retired in 1949.

In 1916 he composed his most famous work, the hymn tune Woodlands, written for the Gresham's School choir, later published in The Public School Hymn Book.

During his long career he also composed other hymns and organ music. Greatorex was known at Gresham's as 'Gog' or 'Greatoxe', and among those he taught at the school were Benjamin Britten (a boarder from 1928 to 1930), Sir Lennox Berkeley and W. H. Auden. Auden wrote of him that Albert Schweitzer played the organ no better than Walter Greatorex.

In July 1949, Greatorex retired to Bournemouth, where he lived in an hotel for a few months until his death in December of the same year.

== In popular culture ==
The cold open of BBC television's Silent Witness episode Suffer the Children uses Far round the world with tune Woodlands, first sung solo by boy treble Billy (Jack Finerty), who is then joined by the catholic school choir which mixes to a young gospel choir to provide the only link between the two otherwise separate stories interwoven in this episode.
