= Steve James (Christian musician) =

Steve James (born 1953) is an English-born Anglican priest. From 1993 to 2006, he was rector of Bebington Parish Church and was rector of Holy Trinity Platt Church, Rusholme, from October 2006 until his retirement in 2019. He is a noted singer and song and hymnwriter and succeeded Michael Saward as chairman of Jubilate Group.

He has recorded and released seven albums of his own material. His best-known songs are The Harvest is Coming, Mighty Gospel, an arrangement of Psalm 90 and the Christmas song Baby Jesus. One of his most recent songs was a collaboration with Don Carson to write Astounding Grace.

Business positions
| Preceded by Michael Saward | Chairman of Jubilate Group; 2001–present | Succeeded by (current incumbent) |
