= List of Chinese hymn books =

This is a list of Chinese Christian hymn books.

== History ==
One such list was compiled by Rev. Donald MacGillivray, D.D., a Protestant Christian missionary in Shanghai with the Canadian Presbyterian Mission in 1911: MacGillivray listed 62 items, but many others have been published since then.

== Protestant hymnals ==
- Hymn-book. 27 leaves, 1818, by Dr. Robert Morrison. This contains a short preface and thirty Hymns, being, in general, prose translations of Psalms, and Hymns commonly used among Christians, which were turned into verse by his Chinese assistants.
- Hymn-book. 46 leaves. Jakarta. Lithography. By Dr. Walter Henry Medhurst. This is a translation of 71 Hymns, chiefly from John Rippon and Isaac Watts, with one from the Gluey collection. After a thorough revision, this was republished at Shanghai, in 77 leaves, 1856. (see also:Rippon's Selection)
- New Hymn Book, 10 leaves, by William Young, Xiamen, 1852. This is a collection of 13 hymns in the Min Nan (Amoy) dialect.
- Prayers and Hymns, pp. 22, Bangkok, 1840, by Dr. Dean. This is on European paper, printed on both sides; neither the leaves nor the pages numbered, and no running title. It commences with a short form of prayer for public use, then a private prayer, and the Lord's prayer, after which are two general forms of prayer. This is followed by 82 hymns, having the time for each marked in Roman characters.
- New Hymn-Book. 59 leaves. Xiamen, 1857, by Mr. Alexander Stronach. The first 13 hymns in this book, which is in the Min Nan dialect, are the collection by Mr. Young; 35 others are from the Presbyterian hymn book, slightly modified; and the remaining 37 are by Mr. Stronach, the compiler.
- Hymns of Praise. 16 leaves. Ningbo, 1851. By Dr. Divie Bethune McCartee. This is a collection, chiefly translations, of 23 hymns and a doxology. It was reprinted at Fuzhou.
- Hymn-Book. 61 leaves, Hong Kong, 1851. By Rev. Rudolph Lechler. This is divided into two parts, the first of which in 22 leaves, contains 55 hymns and 7 doxologies, being a selection from James Legge’s hymn book.
- Hymns and Tunes. 13 leaves. Ningbo, 1856. By Rev. Edward Clemens Lord. In this the Chinese and Roman characters are combined.
- Hymn Book in the Amoy dialect, pp. 26. Xiamen, 1859. By Rev. John Van Nest Talmage. This is a collection of 25 hymns, printed in the Roman character, of which the first 13 are merely a transliteration of Mr. Young’s book. Of the remainder, some were composed by the Rev. Carstairs Douglas.
- Hymns of Praise. 38 leaves. Shanghai, 1858. By Rev. William Muirhead. This is a collection of 100 hymns in the Shanghai dialect, prefaced by a statement of thirty principal doctrines of the Christian religion, with an elaborate detail of pertinent Scripture texts under each. A subsequent edition was published in 55 leaves.
- Salvation Hymns. 39 leaves. Shanghai, 1861. By Rev. William Muirhead. This is a collection of 69 hymns.
- Hymn Book. 30 leaves. Xiamen. By Rev. William Chalmers Burns. This is a collection of 64 hymns and 4 doxologies, with table of contents; the greater part are from Dr. Legge’s hymn book, with slight modification; of about a dozen additional, two or three are entirely new, the remainder being founded on hymns in Dr. Walter Henry Medhurst’s Hymn Book, but entirely remodeled. Mr. Young’s Hymn Book is bound up with it as an appendix.
- Hymns in the Chaon-chow dialect. 21 leaves. Shantou, 1861. By Rev. William C. Burns. This is a collection of 29 hymns in the dialect of the people at Shantou and the surrounding region.
- Hymns in the Fuh-chow Dialect, 25 leaves. Fuzhou, 1861. By Rev. William C. Burns. A collection of 30 hymns and 3 doxologies, with table of contents and doxology appended; besides two hymns on the back of the title-page, on the "Sufferings of Christ," and "Observance of the Sabbath."
- Hymns in the Amoy Dialect, Xiamen, 1862. By Rev. William C. Burns. This is a collection of 20 hymns, four or five of which are new, the remainder having been previously published in the Shantou and Fuzhou dialects.
- Hymns in the Fuh-chow Dialect. 53 leaves. Fuzhou, 1865. By Dr. Robert Samuel Maclay. Thirty-three of these were originally published by Mr. Burns; thirteen of those following are by Dr. Maclay and six by the Rev. Charles Hartwell, the remaining twenty-nine being translated by Dr. Maclay from Dr. Legge's book. There is a preface and table of contents.
- Hymn Book. Beijing. By Rev. Joseph Edkins, B.A. A collection of 81 hymns.
- Hymn Book. pp. 155. Ningbo, 1860. By Rev. Henry Van Vleck Rankin. This is a translation, selection, and compilation of 166 hymns in the Ningbo dialect, printed in the Roman character; a large number being taken from a hymn book printed in 1857 by John Jones, in 122 pages, containing 111 hymns, by various Ningbo missionaries. The measure and the subject is given at the head of each hymn. At the end there is an alphabetical index, and an index of subjects, followed by 9 doxologies.
- Hymn book. pp. 32. Ningpo, 1S55. By Rev. Samuel Newell D. Martin. This is in the Ningbo dialect, printed in the "Roman character".
- Psalms, pp. 72. Ningpo, 1857. By Rev. William Alexander Parsons Martin. This is a selection of the Psalms of David, translated into the Ningbo dialect, and printed in the "Roman character".
- Hymns of Praise. 20 leaves. Guangzhou. 1863. By Rev. George Piercy. There are altogether 34 hymns in this collection, with the measure marked to each.
- Hymn Book. Shanghai, 1855. By Rev. Tarleton Perry Crawford. This is in the Shanghai dialect.
- Hymn Book. 60 leaves. Guangzhou, 1860. By Rev. John Chalmers, A .M. This contains nearly the whole of Dr. Legge's Hymn book, set to music according to the European notation. There are 81 hymns and 7 doxologies.
- Hymn Book. 25 leaves. Shanghai, 1800. By Rev. A. B. Cabaniss. This is a compilation of 21 hymns and 3 doxologies.
- Hymn Book. 87 leaves. Shanghai, 1802. By Rev. John Livingstone Nevius. This is a version in the Mandarin dialect, of 100 hymns from Mr. Rankin's hymn book, and 10 doxologies. They are for the most part translations of favorite English hymns. There is a preface by a native scholar, and a table of contents. A second edition carefully revised, with 24 hymns added from other sources, was published at Shanghai in 1805, in 111 leaves. There is a preface to this edition by Mr. John Livingstone Nevius, in addition to the other.
- Hymns of Praise. 74 leaves. Shanghai, 1861. By Rev. James William Lambuth. This is a collection of 100 hymns translated into the Shanghai dialect. The measure is marked to each in Roman letters.
- Hymn Book. 30 leaves. By Rev. Griffith John. This is a collection of 50 hymns. 1876 edition, with 200 hymns.
- Chang-chow and Tsenen-chow Hymns. 39 leaves. Xiamen, 1862. By Rev. Carstairs Douglas. This is in the Min Nan dialect used in the Xiamen region. The first 25 hymns are an edition of Mr. Talmage's hymn book in the Chinese character. The remainder are by Mr. Douglas the compiler, and other members of the English Presbyterian Mission.
- Hymns set to music, pp. x 80. Ningbo, 1858. By Rev. Elias B. Inslee. In this the music is printed in the European form, and the hymns interlined, first in the Chinese character, the two lower lines being a translation of the same into the Ningbo dialect, printed in the Roman character. The first page contains a short advertisement; next follow, a table of contents, a table of metres, with alphabetical index and five pages of instructions, all in the Ningbo dialect and Roman character. The last five leaves contain the counterpart in the Chinese character, with another table in the Roman.
- Hymn Book. 42 leaves. Beijing, 1864. By Rev. William C. Burns. 1862. A collection of 54 hymns, with table of contents.
- Gospel Hymns. Mandarin. By Rev. J. W. Davis, D.D. 121 Hymns with annotations, specially for enquirers.
- Hymns of revival, with music. By Miss Dora Yu, Shanghai. Mandarin. 110 Gospel Hymns.
- Metrical Paraphrase of the Psalms. By Rev. Frederick W. Baller. Mandarin. 158 pages.
- Hymn book, Mandarin. (Nevius and Mateer). Revised and enlarged edition, 1893. I66 leaves.
- Hymn Book, Mandarin With two English Indexes. Foreign Paper. 315 Hymns. By J. Blodget, D.D. Blodget and Goodrich Hymnal, 1910. new edition, 5 styles.
- Hymn Book, Mandarin Foreign Paper. Cloth cover, with English Index. By Rev. Jonathan Lees, Tianjin 429 Hymns. (348 by Mr. Lees), 1891.
- Memorial Hymn book with Music. White paper 183 leaves. By Rev. A. Woodruff.
- Shanghai Hymn Book, 132 hymns, by William Muirhead, D.D. 1888.
- Union Hymn Book, Shanghai Dialect. 117 leaves.
- Ningpo Hymn Book. 183 leaves.
- Kiang-nan Hymn Book. Index. 199 Leaves.
- Gospel Hymns, 210 in number, 9 different styles. China Baptist Publication Society, Guangzhou.
- Union Hymn Book, in 11 styles. Central China Religious Tract Society.
- Children s Hymnal, by F. W. Baller, China Inland Mission and Miss Garland.
- Hymns of Praise (with music) by English Baptist Missionary Society, Shandong. Including over 200 tunes specially composed for the Chinese church. Tonic Solfa Edition in preparation. 1910.
- Hymn Book of Protestant Episcopal Church of America.
- Evangelistic Hymns, by P. F. Price, D.D.
- Shansi China Inland Mission Hymnal 1901 (contains Pastor Xi Shengmo’s hymns)
- Southern Baptist Hymnal, Shandong. 1902
- Crawford Hymnal, Shandong. 1809 (Tarleton Perry Crawford)
- German Mission Hymnal, Shandong. 1901
- Kiangnan Union Hymnal. 1809
- Ningpo Hymnal. 1910
- Church Missionary Society Hymnal, Bishop Moule. 1893
- Church Missionary Society Hymnal Companion. 1888
- American Church Hymnal. 1893
- Blandford’s Kiangsi Hymnal. 1895 & 1902
- Harry Price’s Kiangsi Hymnal. 1909
- China Inland Mission Hymnal. 1895
- Peking Union Hymnal, (150 hymns). 1905
- Canton Basel Hymnal. 1884
- Hankow Wesleyan Hymnal, 1875
- Hymns of Universal Praise, 1936
- Chinese New Hymnal
- Canaan Hymns
- The Evangel Hymnal, edited by the C&MA missionary William C. Newbern and published in 1940
- Youth Hymns, edited by William C. Newbern and translated by Richard Ho in the 1960s

== Roman Catholic hymnals ==
- Chung-Yan (頌恩), edited by the Diocese of Hong Kong in 2006.
