= Jubilate (disambiguation) =

Jubilate may refer to:

- Psalm 100, from its Latin title
- Jubilate Group, British Christian music publishing house
- Jubilate Sunday
