= History of Ningbo =

History of the city of Ningbo, China

Ningbo's origins date back to over 6,800 years, and its history as a major city began 2,000 years ago, becoming a port for foreign trade during the Tang and Song dynasties. Most of the trade was done by foreign merchants coming to Ningbo.

== History ==
Ningbo is one of China's oldest cities, with a history dating back to the Hemudu culture in 4800 BC. Once known as Mingzhou (明州), Ningbo was known as a trade city on the Silk Road at least two thousand years ago, and then as a major port, along with Yangzhou and Guangzhou in the Tang dynasty; thereafter, the major ports for foreign trade in the Song dynasty.

=== Eastern Jin dynasty ===
Ningbo was the source of Sun En's revolt against the Eastern Jin dynasty. Sun led the "Five Bushels of Rice" (Wudou Midao), a Daoist cult. They were called "armies of demons" and utilized "boats with decks". Zhoushan served as their main base, but they were defeated in the end in 402.

=== Tang and Song dynasty ===
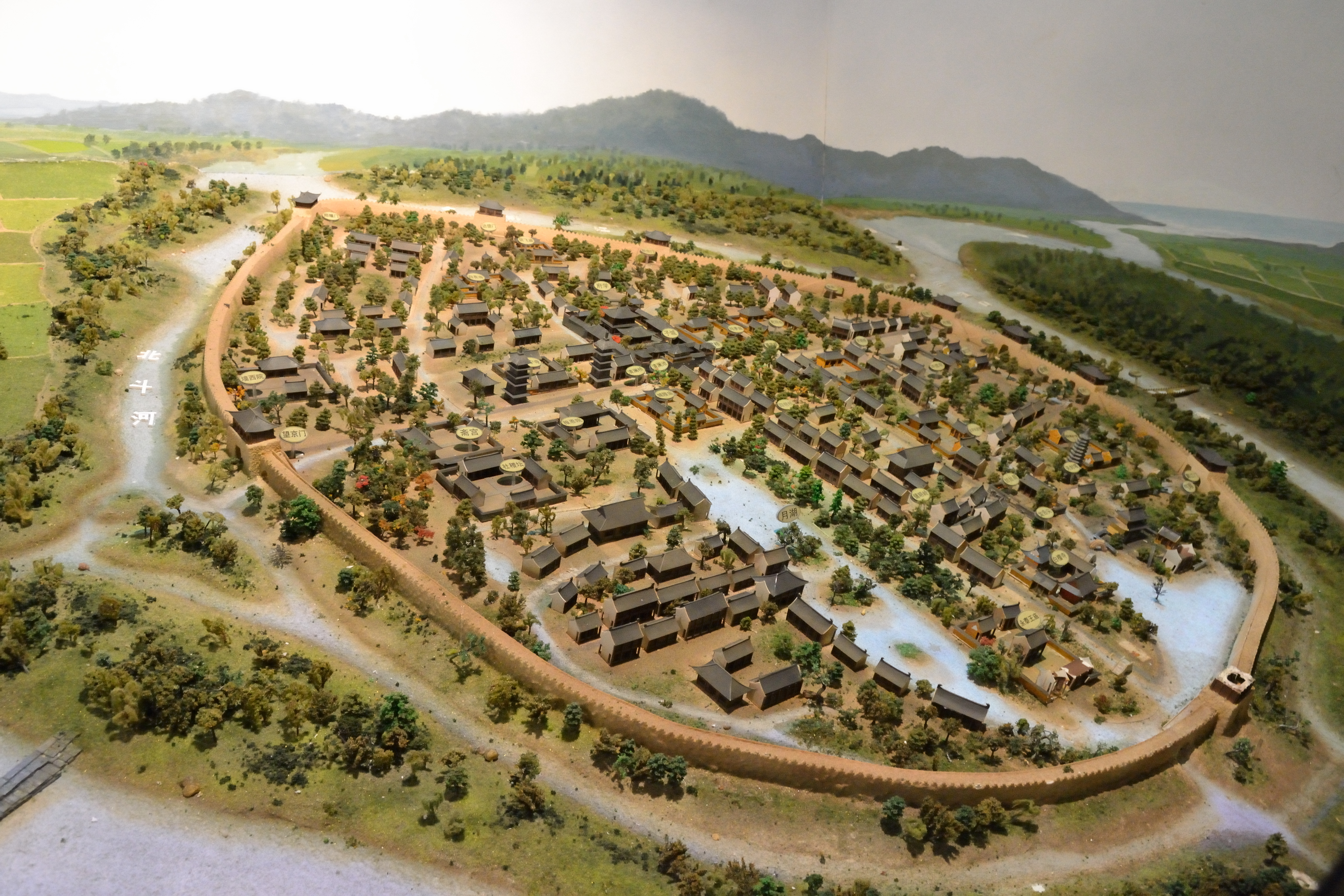
Miniature model of Ningbo during Tang dynasty, known as Mingzhou at the time

Since the Tang dynasty Ningbo was an important commercial port. Arab merchants lived in Ningbo during the Song dynasty when it was known as Mingzhou, due to the fact that the oceangoing trade passages took precedence over land trade during this time. Another name for Mingzhou/Ningbo was Siming. It was a well-known center of oceangoing commerce with the foreign world. These merchants did not intermingle with native Chinese, practicing their own customs and religion and they inhabited ghettos. They did not try to proselytize Islam to Chinese.

During the Song dynasty Ningbo was a host for one of the "Offices for merchant ships" that were created by the government in many coastal cities to tax foreign imports.

The Jin dynasty (1115–1234) invaded the Song dynasty in the 12th century. Before he fled to Wenzhou, Ningbo served as a refuge for Emperor Gaozong of Song. In 1130 the Jin army reached Ningbo. But heavy resistance and the geography of the area halted the Jin advance, and they retreated and withdrew.

=== Ming dynasty ===
The city of Ningbo was known in Europe for a long time under the name of Liampó. This is the usual spelling used e.g. in the standard Portuguese history, João de Barros's Décadas da Ásia, although Barros explained that Liampó was a Portuguese "corruption" of the more correct Nimpó.; the spelling Liampó is also attested in the Peregrination (Peregrinação) by Fernão Mendes Pinto, a (so-called) autobiography written in Portuguese during the 16th century. For the mid-16th-century Portuguese, the nearby promontory, which they called the cape of Liampó, after the nearby "illustrious city" was the easternmost known point of the mainland Asia.

The Portuguese began trading in Ningbo around 1522. By 1542, the Portuguese had a sizable community near Ningbo in Shuangyu. Portuguese activities from their Ningbo base included pillaging and attacking multiple Chinese port cities around Ningbo for plunder and spoil. They also enslaved people during their raids. The resulting complaints made it to the province's governor who commanded the settlement destroyed in 1548.

==== Japanese relations ====
The Ming dynasty decreed that Ningbo was the only place where Japanese-Chinese relations could take place. Ningbo, therefore, was the destination of many Japanese embassies during this period. After going into Ningbo they then went to other cities in China. In 1523, two rival embassies were sent to Ningbo by Japan, then in a state of civil war known as the Sengoku period. One of the emissaries was a Chinese, Song Suqing, who had moved to Japan earlier. Song Suqing became involved in a disagreement with a rival Japanese trade delegation, which led to the Ningbo incident where the Japanese pillaged and plundered in the vicinity of Ningbo before escaping in stolen ships, defeating a Ming pursuing flotilla on the way. As a result of the incident, the port of Ningbo was closed to the Japanese – only two more Japanese missions were received (in 1540 and 1549) until the end of the Ming dynasty.

Ningbo was one of the places where the Portuguese first encountered the Japanese.

=== Qing dynasty ===
Ningbo was one of the five Chinese treaty ports opened by the Treaty of Nanjing (signed in 1842) at the end of the First Opium War between Britain and China. During the war, British forces took possession of the walled city of Ningbo briefly after storming the fortified town of Zhenhai at the mouth of the Yong River on October 10, 1841. The British repulsed a Chinese attempt to retake the city in the Battle of Ningpo on March 10, 1842. In 1864, the forces of the Taiping Rebellion held the town for six months. In March 1885, during the Sino-French War, Admiral Courbet's naval squadron blockaded several Chinese warships in Zhenhai Bay and exchanged fire with the shore defences.

Ningbo was once famed for traditional Chinese furniture production.

During the Qing dynasty, western encyclopedias described Ningbo as a center of craftsmanship and industry- "The gold and silversmiths of Ningpo are noted for the delicacy and tastefulness of their work, and Ningpo confectionery is celebrated all over China. The specialty of the place, however, is its elegantly carved and inlaid furniture. Silk-culture is extensively carried on in the surrounding country, and silk-weaving is an important industry. In 1893 498 piculs of silk piece-goods were exported. The development of manufacturing interests in Japan has given a groat impetus to cotton-culture, and in 1893 the steam cotton-ginning establishments of Ningpo cleaned over 60,000 piculs of raw cotton."

A caste of "degraded" outcasts existed in Ningbo city during the Qing dynasty, around 3,000 people in a class called "to min". Samuel Wells Williams gave an account of them in his book "The Middle kingdom: a survey of the ... Chinese empire and its inhabitants": "There are local prejudices against associating with some portions of the community, though the people thus shut out are not remnants of old castes. The tankia, or boat-people, at Canton form a class in some respects beneath the other portions of the community, and have many customs peculiar to themselves. At Ningpo there is a degraded set called to min, amounting to nearly three thousand persons, with whom the people will not associate. The men are not allowed to enter the examinations or follow an honorable calling, but are play-actors, musicians, or sedan-bearers; the women are match-makers or female barbers and are obliged to wear a peculiar dress, and usually go abroad carrying a bundle wrapped in a checkered handkerchief. The tankia at Canton also wear a similar handkerchief on their head, and do not cramp their feet. The to min are supposed to be descendants of the Kin, who held northern China in A.d. 1100, or of native traitors who aided the Japanese, in 1555–1563, in their descent upon Chehkiang. The tankia came from some of the Miaotsz' tribes so early that their origin is unknown."

A detailed account of an Englishman who stayed in Ningbo can be found in The Chinese repository, Volume 13, published in 1844. He visited the mosque of the local Hui people. The imam was from Shandong, and claimed to be a descendant of Muslims from the city of Medina. He spoke both Arabic and Chinese, and could read Arabic as well. Around 30 families attended his congregation, Quranic verses decorated his apartments, and his possessions included Muslim holy texts and clothing. However, the imam described Hangzhou as being the "Stronghold" of Islam in the region.

The Hui population of Ningbo were descended from Hui people from Shandong who moved to Ningbo during the 17th century. Their main profession was trade, and they spoke the Shandong Mandarin dialect. The Hui Muslim mosque was called "Hwuy-Hwuy Tang" HuiHui Tang, in Chinese. The keepers of the building were from Shandong and spoke Mandarin. The mosque was a small building, with many Arabic inscriptions, 500 Muslims lived in Ningbo. There was formerly a Jewish synagogue in Ningbo, as well as one in Hangzhou, but no traces of them are now discoverable, and the only Jews known to exist in China are in Kaifeng. These Hui could speak Mandarin Chinese, and read and write Arabic, but were not able to read a single Chinese character. The Ah-hung (Imam) of the Hui community in Ningbo was always from Shandong, their home province. The Ah-hung which the Englishman met was originally from Chi-nan Fu (in Shandong) but for twenty years had been living at Ningbo and Hangzhou. He had an Arabic New Testament in his possision, and he told western missionaries about Jewish communities living in Changsha, Hunan, and at Hangzhou. He mentioned that at Hangzhou are some families of the Kwan Ch'uan-kiao, i.e., the patriarchal sect.

When the Chinese Jewish community existed in Ningbo, floods and fire repeatedly destroyed the books of the Kaifeng Jewish synagogue, they obtained some from Ningxia and Ningbo to replace them, another Hebrew roll of law was bought from a Muslim in Ning-keang-chow in Shen-se (Shanxi), who acquired it from a dying Jew at Canton.

==== Massacre of Portuguese pirates ====
During the Qing dynasty, in the 19th century, the Ningbo authorities contracted Cantonese pirates to exterminate and massacre Portuguese pirates who raided Cantonese shipping around Ningbo. The massacre was "successful", with 40 Portuguese dead and only 2 Chinese dead, being dubbed "The Ningpo Massacre" by an English correspondent, who noted that the Portuguese pirates had behaved savagely towards the Chinese, and that the Portuguese authorities at Macau should have reigned in the pirates.

Portuguese pirates who raided Cantonese shipping in the early 19th century were exterminated by Cantonese forces around Ningbo.

The Ningbonese people supported the Cantonese massacre of the Portuguese pirates and the attack on the Portuguese consul. The Cantonese did not see the Portuguese as the same as other Europeans, not being afraid of them and fighting them man to man. The Ningbo authorities had made an agreement with a Cantonese pirate named A'Pak to exterminate the Portuguese pirates. The Portuguese did not even try to fight when the Cantonese pirates sacked their consulate, trying to flee and hide among the tombs, the Cantonese butchered around 40 Portuguese while sacking the consulate. Only two Chinese and one Englishman who sided with the Cantonese died.

==== Protestant missionaries ====
Western missionaries set up a Presbyterian Church in Ningbo. Li Veng-eing was a Reverend of the Ningpo Church. The Ningpo College was managed by Rev. Robert F. Fitch. The four trustees were natives of Ningbo, three of them had Taotai rank. Furthermore, one of the infant Sunday-schools in Ningpo under Mrs. Fitch's supervision had over 100 scholars.

Rev. George Evans Moule, B. A. was appointed a missionary to China by the Church of England Missionary Society, and arrived at Ningpo with Mrs. Moule in February, 1858. He then commenced a mission station at Hang-chow, between which and Ningpo his time had been chiefly divided. He wrote Christian publications in the Ningbo dialect.

According to the "Record of Christian work, Volume 23", Divie Bethune McCartee was a respected and prominent Presbyterian medical missionary at Ningbo. The Presbytery of Ningpo held annual meetings.

The Status of the Presbyterian Mission in Ningbo in 1845 was stated as: "Ningpo: on the Ningpo River, 12 miles from the sea; occupied as a Mission station, 1845– missionary laborers—Rev. John Butler and wife, Miss Abbie P. Ketchum, and Miss Bessie Houston; Rev. Memrt. Zia Yingtong, Bao-kwong-hgi, Uoh Cong-eng, Loh-dong-un, Zi-Kyuo-jing, Lu-Cing-veng, Yiang-Ling-tsiao; i0 evangelists, and 8 teachers aud assistants."

The Presbyterian Synod of China consisted of Canton, Japan, Ningpo, Peking, Shanghai, Shantung. Samuel Dodd served as the minister at Ningbo. Rev.W. A. Russell was the Corresponding Secretary of the Church Missionary Society at Ningbo.

=== Republican era ===
During World War II in 1940, Japan bombed Ningbo with fleas carrying the bubonic plague. According to Daniel Barenblatt, Prince Tsuneyoshi Takeda received, with Prince Mikasa, a special screening by Shirō Ishii of a film showing imperial planes loading germ bombs for bubonic dissemination over Ningbo in 1940.

"It has been said of the Ningbo fishermen that, 'no people in the world apparently made so great an advance in the art of fishing; and for centuries past no people have made so little further progress.'"
