= Lin Shengben =

Chinese hymn composer (1927–2025)

Lin Shengben (simplified Chinese: 林声本; traditional Chinese: 林聲本; May 5, 1927 – March 6, 2025) was a Chinese hymn composer, known for his songs composed with Chinese traditional tunes.

== Biography ==
Lin lost his mom and dad at the ages of 8 and 10 respectively. Due to the Sino-Japanese War, his childhood was spent in the forest fleeing the Japanese army. He began his theological education at Alliance Bible Institute (now Alliance Bible Seminary in Hong Kong) at Wuzhou, Guangxi in 1945. Two years later, he was enrolled to Leung Kwong Baptist Seminary (now the Hong Kong Baptist Theological Seminary) and, at the age of 23, he started studying church music at China Baptist Theological Seminary, Shanghai (Chinese: 上海中華浸會神學院), supervised under Ma Geshun (Chinese: 馬革順; 1914–2015), a professor at the Shanghai Conservatory of Music and one of the most significant choral conductors in twentieth-century China. He then studied theology and sacred music at Nanjing Theological Seminary in 1952 for two years.

He was a pastor of Jingling Church, Shanghai (Chinese: 上海景靈堂); formerly known as Jinglin Church (Chinese: 景林堂) from 1980 until his retirement in 2002.

As one of the four editors of the Chinese New Hymnal, some of his works were compiled to this hymnal, which is still widely used in the Three-Self churches in China. One of his most famous hymns, Winter is Past (Chinese: 與主同去歌), was co-written with the Chinese theologian Wang Weifan.

Lin died on March 6, 2025, at the age of 97.

== Works ==
- Lin Shengben (2017). Yu zhu tong qu: Lin Shengben quxuan 與主同去：林聲本曲選 [Come with the Lord: Anthems by Lin Sheng-Ben] (in Chinese). Hong Kong: Chinese Christian Literature Council. ISBN 978962-294250-9.

== See also ==
- Chinese New Hymnal
