= John Barnard (composer) =

British musician

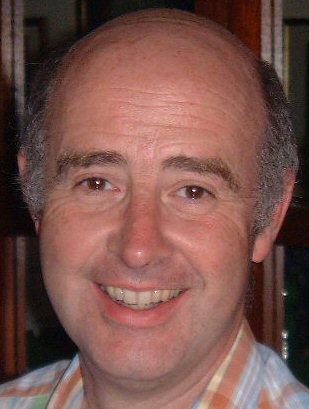
- Born: 20 April 1948; London, England, UK
- Occupation: Retired school teacher of German.
- Known for: Writing the hymn tune Guiting Power to Christ triumphant, ever reigning.
- Criminal charges: Making indecent images and possessing indecent photographs
- Criminal penalty: Four-month suspended prison sentence

John Barnard (born 20 April 1948) is a Fellow of the Royal College of Organists (FRCO), an Associate of the Royal School of Church Music (ARSCM) and an active developer of church music as a composer, arranger, choir director, and organist in North West London, England.

Barnard was on the Council of the Hymn Society of Great Britain and Ireland and has been active in helping to assemble such publications as Hymns for Today's Church, Carols for Today and Psalms for Today. He has been Director of Music at a series of high-profile churches, which include Emmanuel Church (Northwood), St. Alban's Church (North Harrow), John Keble Church (Mill Hill) and St. John the Evangelist Church (Stanmore). He returned to John Keble Church in September 2010, following the appointment of Canon Chris Chivers as Vicar.

== Life and work ==
Barnard went to Cambridge University to read Modern and Medieval Languages at Selwyn College followed by a PGCE at Exeter University.

He taught modern languages at Cheltenham Grammar School from 1971 to 1974; John Lyon School, Harrow from 1974 to 2002; Godolphin and Latymer School in Hammersmith from 2002 to 2004; and Aldenham School from 2002.

He has written music and arrangements for hymns and a number of arrangements for spirituals. Arguably his most famous work is his hymn tune Guiting Power, which usually provides the music for Michael Saward's hymn Christ triumphant, ever reigning.

Barnard has been involved in directing the music for BBC Radio 2's Sunday Half Hour. In 2006, he was a judge for a BBC hymn-writing competition, for which he composed the hymn tunes Kirknewton and Gowanbank for two of the winning entries.

The vast majority of John Barnard's hymn tunes are named after villages or towns in the United Kingdom; for example, Guiting Power is a village in the Cotswolds, Gloucestershire.

His compositions are represented in the United States and Canada by the Hope Publishing Company, and in the United Kingdom by Jubilate Hymns and Oxford University Press.

== Conviction ==
In April 2015, Barnard pleaded guilty to possession and printing of pornographic images of 14- to 16-year-old boys. He received a suspended jail sentence and has since been suspended as Head of Choir at John Keble Church, Edgware, London.

== List of original hymn tunes ==
Asthall (7 8 7 8)	Barnard Gate (11 10 11 10)	Bekesbourne (10 10 7 7)	Bishops Cannings (6 6 6 6 8 8)
Bless the Lord (Irregular)	Brightwell Baldwin (8 6 8 6 (CM))	Bulkington (6 6 6 6 8 8)	Buttermere (8 8 8 8 (LM))
Checkenden (8 6 8 6 8 6 8 6 7 7 8 7)	Chedworth (10 10 10 10)	Chedworth (10 11 11 11)	Christingle Praise (7 7 7 5 7 7 5)
Coln Rogers (3 9 3 6 3 7 8 5)	Coln Saint Dennis (9 9 10 9)	Coulston (4 6 8 8 4 4)	Cuxham (7 7 7 7 D)
Edington (10 10 4 4 10 10)	Erlestoke (6 5 6 5)	Ewelme (8 8 8 4)	Eythorne (7 6 8 6 8 6)
Fossebridge (8 8 8 8 (LM))	Framlingham (8 8 8 6 D)	Freshford (12 12 12 12)	God is in Bethlehem (8 7 8 7 + refrain)
God is the King (Irregular)	Gowanbank (8 7 8 7 D)	Great Cheverell (10 10 7 8 10)	Great Stanmore (10 10 10 10)
Greenhill (8 8 8 8 8 8)	Guiting Power (8 5 8 5 7 9)	Harrow Weald (5 5 5 5 5 5 5 4)	Heanish (8 7 8 7 D)
How Good it is to Give Thanks (Irregular)	Let Everything (Irregular)	Lewknor (7 7 7 7)	Little Barrington (4 4 4 4 4 4 4)
Little Stanmore (8 8 8 6)	Littlebourne (7 7 11 8)	Long Crendon (11 11 11 5)	Ludlow (11 11 9 10)
Lyminge (8 8 7 D)	Manton Hollow (8 8 8 4)	Nannerch (8 7 8 7 8 7)	O Sing to the Lord (Irregular)
Paschal Dawn (6 7 7 11)	Patrixbourne (8 7 8 7 7 7)	Potterne (7 6 7 6 D)	Riseley (8 6 8 6 6)
Roxeth (7 7 7 4 D)	Stanton (8 6 8 6 (CM))	Stanton Harcourt (6 6 6 6 3 4 5)	Steeple Ashton (6 6 8 6 (SM))
Swyncombe (6 6 8 4)	Temple Guiting (6 6 10 5)	Tenhead (5 6 6 4)	Upton Cheyney (7 4 7 4 D)
Upton Scudamore (10 10 10 10)	Urchfont (7 7 7 7)	Wealdstone (8 7 8 7 D)	West Ashton (10 10 10 10)
Widford (13 13 7 7 13)	Wings of Joy (6 4 4 6 4)	Withington (8 6 8 8 8 6)	Yanworth (10 10 10 10)
You are my Refuge (10 7 6 6 10)			
