= Hugh Blackburne =

Hugh Charles Blackburne was the Bishop of Thetford from 1977 until 1981.

Blackburne was born into an ecclesiastical family on 4 June 1912 and educated at Marlborough and Clare College, Cambridge before beginning his ordained ministry as a curate in Almondbury. He was then a chaplain in the Forces and then held incumbencies at Milton, Hampshire, Harrow, the Hillsborough parishes and Ranworth before being ordained to the episcopate. He died on 15 October 1995.

Church of England titles
Preceded by Eric William Bradley Cordingly	Bishop of Thetford; 1977 –1981	Succeeded by Timothy Dudley-Smith
