= Eric Cordingly =

Eric William Bradley Cordingly MBE (17 May 1911 – 14 August 1976) was the Anglican Bishop of Thetford from 1963 until his death in 1976.

== Early life and ordination ==
Cordingly studied theology at King's College London and St Stephen's House, Oxford before his ordinations. He was deaconed on Trinity Sunday 1934 (27 May) and priest the next Trinity Sunday (16 June 1935) – both times by Arthur Winnington-Ingram, Bishop of London at St Paul's Cathedral. He was a curate at St Peter Le Poer, Friern Barnet (1934–1936). He then became curate at Minchinhampton, before becoming Rector of Stanton in 1938.

== Prisoner of war ==
After the start of World War II, Cordingly joined as an army chaplain in a territorial battalion of the Royal Northumberland Fusiliers. He was deployed to France and took part in the Dunkirk evacuation. On 4 February 1942, Cordingly's unit arrived in Singapore. Just a few days later, British forces lost the Battle of Singapore and surrendered to Japan. From 18 February 1942 until the end of the war, Cordingly was held as a prisoner of war by Japanese forces. He spent most of this time at a prisoner-of-war camp in Changi, Singapore. The site is now commemorated at the Changi Museum, which contains the original cross that Cordingly used during his wartime church services.

From April 1943 to April 1944 Cordingly was sent with other prisoners to Thailand to work on the Burma Railway. Many of his fellow captives did not survive. He later wrote about this experience in a book, Beyond Hatred, calling it "To me a year—the toughest of my life, grim and shocking as it was—which on reflection I would not have missed. I have learned much—but it is a year I would never wish to live through again. Eight chaplains were in this Force—three are buried in Thailand."

== Release ==
After the Surrender of Japan and the end of World War II, Cordingly returned to the UK. He was subsequently awarded an MBE for his services while he was a prisoner-of-war. He resumed his work as Rector of Leckhampton. In 1955, Cordingly became Rector of Stevenage. From 1960 to 1963 he was an Honorary Chaplain to the Queen. in 1962 he was appointed Archdeacon of Norfolk. A year later he became Bishop of Thetford: he was consecrated a bishop by Michael Ramsey, Archbishop of Canterbury, on 18 October 1963 at Westminster Abbey.

== Personal life ==
Cordingly died in 1976, aged 65. He was married with four children. His eldest son, David Cordingly, is a naval historian.

== War Diaries ==
In 2013, his family published Down to Bedrock - a collection of the diaries he wrote as prisoner of war.

Church of England titles
Preceded by Martin Leonard	Bishop of Thetford; 1963 –1976	Succeeded by Hugh Blackburne
