= Basil Joseph Mathews =

English historian, biographer, journalist, librarian, editor and writer

Basil Joseph Mathews (28 August 1879 – 29 March 1951) was an English historian, biographer, and writer on the ecumenical movement.

In his early life, Mathews was a librarian, a journalist, and Editorial Secretary of the London Missionary Society. During the First World War he worked for the Ministry of Information.

== Early life ==
Mathews was born at Oxford in 1879, the eldest son of Angelo Alfred Hankins Mathews, an insurance broker, and his wife, Emma Colegrove.

After leaving the City of Oxford High School for Boys, he worked at the Bodleian Library and the Oxford City Library, then was employed by A. M. Fairbairn, Principal of Mansfield College, Oxford, as a secretary. He then matriculated at the university and in 1904 graduated Bachelor of Arts in modern history.

== Career ==
After the university, Mathews was a journalist for the Christian World. Soon after reporting from the World Missionary Conference of 1910, he became Editorial Secretary of the London Missionary Society. In 1913, he published his first book, an illustrated biography of David Livingstone, the Victorian missionary. From 1917 to 1918, during the First World War, he worked for the Ministry of Information.

As well as works on the history of religion, including a life of Jesus, Mathews published biographies of Booker T. Washington and John Mott. He also wrote the hymn Far round the world thy children sing their song.

== Private life ==
In 1911, Mathews was living in Reigate, Surrey, with his first wife, Harriett Anne Passmore, a farmer’s daughter, and his mother-in-law. Mathews’s father died at Boars Hill, near Oxford, in 1928, leaving his mother widowed. She lived until 1948, when she was aged ninety.

Mathews’s first wife died in 1939. In the spring of 1940, in Kensington, he married secondly Winifred Grace Wilson. He spent his final years at Triangle Cottage, Boars Hill, and died at the Warneford Hospital, Oxford, in 1951, leaving a widow, Winifred, and an estate valued for probate at £3,706.

== Honours ==
- Doctor of Law, University of British Columbia

== Major publications ==
- Livingstone, the Pathfinder, illustrated by Ernest Prater (Oxford and London: Henry Frowde Oxford University Press, 1913)
- John Williams, the shipbuilder, illustrated by Ernest Prater (London and Oxford: Humphrey Milford Oxford University Press, 1915; new edition by Ulan Press, 2012)
- The Ships of Peace (London and Oxford: Humphrey Milford Oxford University Press, 1919; new edition by Wentworth Press, 2016, ISBN 978-1372743375)
- The Argonauts of Faith; the adventures of the "Mayflower" Pilgrims (Washington DC: Library of Congress, 1920)
- The Clash of Colour: a study in the problem of race (Doran, 1924; reprinted Port Washington, NY: Kennikat Press, 1973)
- Young Islam on Trek: A Study in the Clash of Civilizations (1926)
- The Clash of World Forces: a Study in Nationalism, Bolshevism and Christianity (London: Edinburgh House Press, 1931)
- A Life of Jesus (New York: R. R. Smith Inc., 1931)
- The Jew and the World Ferment (London: Edinburgh House Press, 1934)
- John R. Mott, world citizen (New York and London: Harper & Brothers, 1934)
- Shaping the future : a study in world revolution (London: Student Christian Movement Press, 1936)
- East and West: conflict or cooperation? (1936)
- Booker T. Washington, educator and interracial interpreter (Cambridge, Harvard University Press, 1948)
- Crisis of the West Indian family; a sample study (1952)
- Disciples of All Nations (1952)
- The Riddle of Nearer Asia (New edition by Nabu Press, 2010, ISBN 978-1172199143)
- Essays on Vocation (New edition by Wentworth Press, 2016, ISBN 978-1373878519)
- Yarns on African Pioneers to Be Told to Boys (New edition by Wentworth Press, 2016)
- Kerala: the Land of Palms (New edition by Wentworth Press, 2016)
- Paul the Dauntless, the Course of a Great Adventure (New edition by Wentworth Press, 2016, ISBN 978-1363441051)
- Fellowship in Thought and Prayer (New edition by Wentworth Press, 2016, ISBN 978-1362230076)
- The Book of Missionary Heroes (New edition by Wentworth Press, 2016, ISBN 978-1360992334)
- Three Years' War for Peace (New edition by Palala Press, 2016, ISBN 978-1356205530)
