= Kin Yamei =

Doctor, hospital administrator and educator

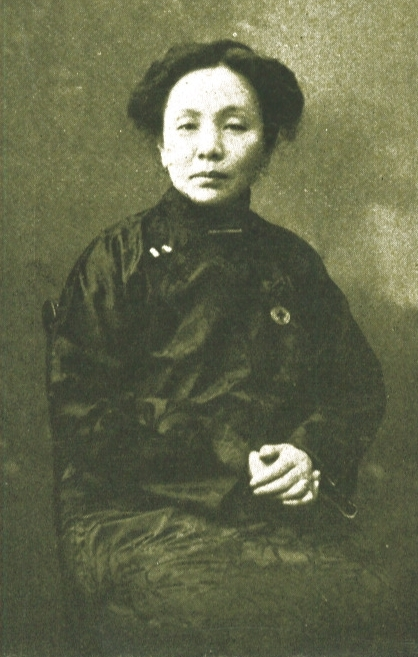
- Born: 1864; Ningbo, China
- Died: March 4, 1934 (aged 69–70); Beijing, China
- Education: Women's Medical College of the New York Infirmary (MD)
- Known for: Introducing tofu to the United States

Kin Yamei (金韻梅; 1864 – March 4, 1934) also seen as Chin Ya-mei or Jin Yunmei, or anglicized as Y. May King, was a Chinese-born, American-raised doctor, hospital administrator, educator, and nutrition expert. She is credited with introducing tofu to the United States Department of Agriculture (USDA) during World War I.

== Early life ==
Kin Yamei was born in 1864, in Ningbo. Her father, Rev. Kying Ling-yiu (Chin Ding-yu), was a Christian convert. When she was two years old she was orphaned during the cholera epidemic; she was adopted by American missionaries, Divie Bethune McCartee and Juana M. Knight McCartee. They encouraged her to use her given name, and to learn Chinese as well as English; she also learned to speak Japanese and French. She attended the Women's Medical College of the New York Infirmary, founded by Elizabeth Blackwell, where she graduated at the top of her class in 1885. The Chinese Consul attended the graduation ceremony to witness her achievement. She pursued further study in Philadelphia and Washington, D. C. She also learned photography skills, and published a journal article on medical photo-micrography while she was in medical school.

== Career ==
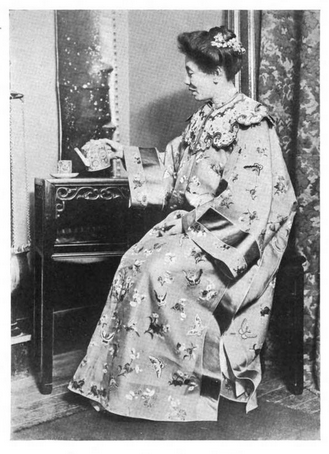
Kin Yamei, from a 1905 publication.

From 1890 to 1894, she ran a hospital for women and children in Kobe, Japan, where she stayed while recovering from malaria. She was superintendent at a women's hospital and nurses' training program at Tianjin. She also founded the Northern Medical School for Women at Zhili, in 1907.

She also lectured in the United States about Chinese culture, women, and medicine, including a speech to the Los Angeles Medical Association, and a speech at Carnegie Hall. She published an article about Honolulu's Chinatown in Overland Monthly (1902), and an article about soybeans in the New-York Tribune (1904). She spent World War I in the United States, working with the USDA on nutritional and other uses for soybeans, and introducing tofu to American food scientists. She addressed an international Peace Conference in 1904, in New York City.

== Personal life ==
Kin Yamei married Hippolytus Laesola Amador Eca da Silva, in 1894 in Japan. Mr. da Silva was a merchant and interpreter born in Hong Kong. They divorced in 1904. They had a son, Alexander, born in 1895 in Honolulu, Hawaii; he died in 1918 as an American soldier in World War I, in France, and was buried at Arlington National Cemetery, under the name "Alexander A. Kin". Kin Yamei returned to China and spent her later years in Beijing, and died from pneumonia in 1934, aged 70 years.
