= Far round the world =

- Genre: Hymn
- Written: before 1927
- Text: Basil Joseph Mathews
- Meter: 10.10.10.10
- Melody: Dunblane Cathedral by Archie Fairbairn Barnes; Farley Castle by Henry Lawes; Parting by Jane W. Rhodes; Peel Castle arr. William Henry Gill; Rutgers by Charles Henry Doersam; Woodlands by Walter Greatorex

Far round the world thy children sing their song is an English hymn written by Basil Joseph Mathews (1879 – 1951) published in Church Hymnary in 1927.

== Music ==
"Far round the world" appears in hymnals with various tunes:

- Dunblane Cathedral composed by Archie Fairbairn Barnes (1878 – 1960), published in 1927
- Farley Castle composed by Henry Lawes (1596 – 1662) in 1638
- Parting composed by Jane W. Rhodes in 1910
- Peel Castle arranged by William Henry Gill (1839 – 1923)
- Rutgers composed by Charles Henry Doersam (1879 – 1942)
- Woodlands composed by Walter Greatorex (1877 – 1949) for Gresham's School (where he was Director of Music) in 1916. Woodlands is the name of a house at the school.

== Words ==
Some hymnals present different verses: often the second verse below is omitted, and the final verse in School Praise is different to the final verse in other hymnals.

Far round the world thy children sing their song,
From east and west their voices sweetly blend,
Praising the Lord, in whom young lives are strong,
Jesus, our guide, our hero, and our friend.

Guide of the pilgrim clambering to the height,
Hero on whom our fearful hearts depend,
Friend of the wanderer yearning for the light,
Jesus, our guide, our hero, and our friend.

— Stanzas 1–2 from School Praise (1937) p. 224-225

== In popular culture ==
The cold open of BBC television's Silent Witness episode Suffer the Children uses 'Far round the world' with tune Woodlands, first sung solo by boy treble Billy (Jack Finerty), who is then joined by the catholic school choir which mixes to a young gospel choir to provide the only link between the two otherwise separate stories interwoven in this episode.
