= Ernest Prater =

English painter

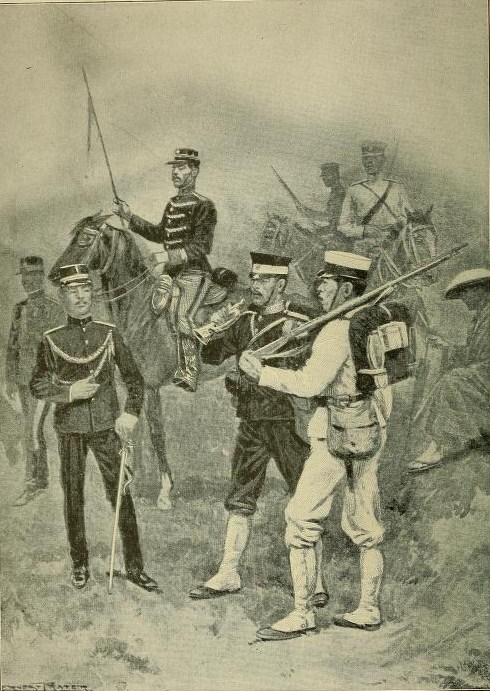
Soldiers of the Japanese army (1904 illustration)

Ernest Prater (1864–1950) was a noted English artist and book illustrator, notable also for his work as a war correspondent and reportage artist during the Anglo-Boer War.

== Life and works ==
Prater was born in Islington in London, of Cornish descent; his father was Joseph Prater of Crantock, Cornwall. He attended Dr. Devonshire's school in London, and began his working life as a publisher's clerk and took up drawing. His listing in Who's Who in Art for 1929 stated that his recreations included all vigorous sports.

He served for a period with the 3rd Middlesex Artillery. He became a Boer War correspondent for The Sphere, attached to General Buller's column, sending back illustrations from the battlefield. He also worked for the Black & White Budget and The Graphic newspapers. As well as being an illustrator, he was an adept photographer. He contributed illustrations to the Strand Magazine, Pall Mall Gazette and Boy's Own Paper and for books published by the Society for Promoting Christian Knowledge, the Religious Tract Society, Carey Press, Sheldon Press and others.

Prater specialised in illustrating boys' adventure stories. Among the well-known authors whose works he illustrated were G.A. Henty, R.M. Ballantyne, W.H.G. Kingston, Percy F. Westerman, Frank T. Bullen, Tom Bevan, Herbert Hayens and Bessie Marchant.

He was noted for his painting The Last Pass: A Thrilling Moment in a Rugby Match'.

He also collaborated with Sidney Paget, the illustrator for the Sherlock Holmes books by Sir Arthur Conan Doyle. One such drawing was the funeral for Queen Victoria (location unknown).

In 1911 he was living at Newquay, The Leas, Westcliff in the parish of Prittlewell. His occupation is Artist Illustrator B and W. Living in the household are his wife Florence Alice Prater (née Norris) and their children Gladys Alma (11), Marie Lilian Marguerite (9), Minnie Winifred (6), Ruby Albina (3) and Raleigh Brandon (1). He died in London on Sunday 11 June 1950, aged 86. A photograph of him appeared in The Sphere on 27 January 1900, and in The Year's Art in 1901.

== Selected illustrated books ==
- Henty, G. A. The lost heir (Toronto: Copp, Clark, 1899).
- Lampen, Charles Dudley. Mirango the man-eater: a tale of Central Africa (London, Society for Promoting Christian Knowledge, 1899).
- Miller, J. Martin. Official history of the Russian-Japanese war (1904).
- Mathews, Basil Joseph.
  - Livingstone, the Pathfinder, illustrated by Ernest Prater (Oxford and London: Henry Frowde Oxford University Press, 1913)
  - John Williams, the shipbuilder (Oxford and London: Humphrey Milford, Oxford University Press, 1915).
- Padwick, C. E. Mackay of the Great Lake (London: H. Milford, Oxford University Press, 1917).
