= Lift Up Your Hearts! =

1881 English hymn

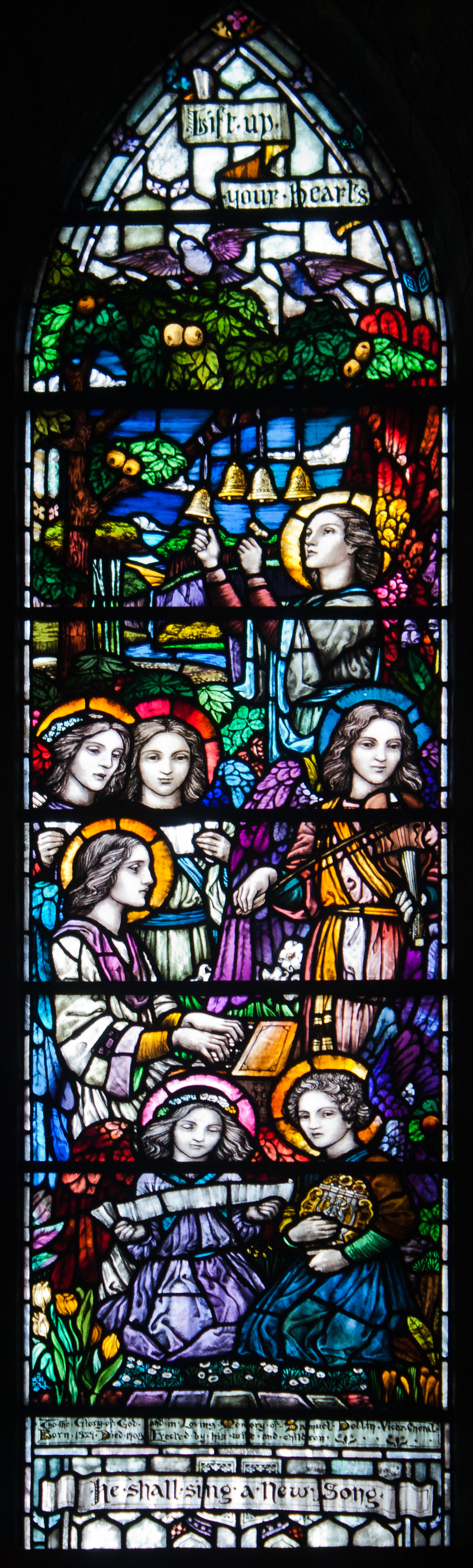
- Lift up your hearts! as sung by angels in a stained glass window designed by An Túr Gloine artists in 1909
- Genre: Hymn
- Written: 1881
- Text: H. Montagu Butler
- Based on: Lamentations 3:40-42
- Meter: 10.10.10.10
- Melody: "Woodlands" by Walter Greatorex

Lift up your hearts! is an English hymn written in 1881 by the Anglican academic and clergyman H. Montagu Butler. The words echo the English translation of the Sursum corda, a part of the communion liturgy in Christian churches.

== Music ==
In the Church of England, Lift up your hearts! is usually sung to Woodlands, a musical setting composed by Walter Greatorex for Gresham's School (where he was Director of Music) in 1916. Woodlands is the name of a house at the school.

== School song ==
The hymn became the school song of Walter Greatorex's old school, Derby (a tradition continued by Derby Grammar School), Haileybury and Imperial Service College, Hertford, and also of Poundswick Grammar School, Wythenshawe, Manchester. It is also the school hymn of Melbourne's Haileybury College, Benenden School, Hilton College, Cranbrook, County Grammar School for Boys, Woking, Surrey and Queen Mary's High School for Girls, Walsall and Mayfield Preparatory School, also part of the Queen Mary's foundation. It was also the school song of Thoresby High School for Girls in the centre of Leeds until this school combined to become co-ed with Central Grammar School for Boys in 1972. It was also the school hymn for Stoke Damerel High School for Girls in Plymouth (1926 - 1986 closure). It was also the school hymn for Kingston High School, Kingston upon Hull.

== Words ==
'Lift up your hearts!' We lift them, Lord, to thee;
Here at thy feet none other may we see:
'Lift up your hearts!' E'en so, with one accord,
We lift them up, we lift them to the Lord.

Above the level of the former years,
The mire of sin, the slough of guilty fears,
The mist of doubt, the blight of love's decay,
O Lord of Light, lift all our hearts to-day!

Above the swamps of subterfuge and shame,
The deeds, the thoughts, that honor may not name,
The halting tongue that dares not tell the whole,
O Lord of Truth, lift every Christian soul!

Lift every gift that thou thyself hast given;
Low lies the best till lifted up to heaven:
Low lie the bounding heart, the teeming brain,
Till, sent from God, they mount to God again.

Then, as the trumpet-call, in after years,
'Lift up your hearts!' rings pealing in our ears,
Still shall those hearts respond, with full accord,
'We lift them up, we lift them to the Lord!'

— from The English Hymnal (1906), #429
