= Jubilate Group =

Christian book publisher

The Jubilate Group
- Founded: 1980
- Founder: Michael Baughen
- Country of origin: United Kingdom
- Headquarters location: Torquay, Devon, England
- Official website: jubilate.co.uk

The Jubilate Group is a Christian publishing house that administers copyright for more than sixty composers and writers. The group was founded by Michael Baughen in the 1960s. The group's first production was Youth Praise. In 1982, Jubilate published Hymns for Today's Church, one of the first hymn books with completely modernised language. In 1999, Sing Glory, Jubilate's most recent major hymn book, was published.

== Chairmen of Jubilate ==
Name	Dates
Michael Baughen	1980 to 1999
Michael Saward	1999 to 2001
Steve James	2001 to 2014 (?)
Noël Tredinnick	2014 (?) to present

== History ==
=== Founding ===
In the early 1960s, the Reverend Michael Baughen (who later became Anglican Bishop of Chester) was concerned about the declining popularity of traditional hymns, and brought together a few friends to see what might be done about it. Some were composers, others lyricists. Over a long period this group worked together and wrote a collection of 150 new songs, entitled Youth Praise. The Church Pastoral Aid Society (a long-established English home missionary society) accepted Youth Praise and, in March 1966, published it. Within a short time it became a best-seller among its kind. Three years later the CPAS published Youth Praise 2.

By 1966 the central group comprised Michael Baughen, Richard Bewes, Christopher Collins, Christopher Idle, Edward Shirras, Michael Saward, James Seddon, Norman Warren, David Wilson and Michael Perry.

In 1980, the group became a limited liability company with the title Jubilate Hymns Ltd.

=== In the United States ===
George Shorney of Hope Publishing in Carol Stream, Illinois, enlisted the independent cooperation, first of Timothy Dudley-Smith and then of the extended group. As a result of his effort The Jubilate Group and its works have found their way into the American hymnals Worship, Rejoice in the Lord, The Hymnal 1982, Psalter Hymnal, The Worshiping Church, The Baptist Hymnal, Christian Worship, Trinity Hymnal and others. Similarly, many American hymns have emerged in Jubilate Group publications.

=== Later work ===
The Jubilate Group considered the book of Psalms and produced a collection of many psalms, written in the language of the day and set to appropriate music. In 1973, the CPAS published Psalm Praise, and in 1990 Psalms for Today and Songs from the Psalms.

== Styles of work ==
Under Michael Baughen’s guidance, background work began on the broader scene; hymns of quiet reflection, of prayer, of commitment, of personal faith - the ‘general’ hymn. In 1982, some seven years after the work started, Hymns for Today’s Church was published by Hodder & Stoughton. It sold in six editions. The words committee was composed of Michael Saward (chairman), Richard Bewes, Patrick Goodland, Kenneth Habershon, Christopher Idle, Alex Mitchell, Michael Perry, Clifford Roseweir and James Seddon. The music committee was composed of David Wilson (chairman), John Barnard, Simon Beckley, David Iliff, David Peacock, Christian Strover, Noël Tredinnick and Norman Warren. The advisers were Owen Thomas and Paul Wigmore.

In 1999 Kevin Mayhew published Sing Glory, 698 hymns and worship songs meeting a wider range of congregational needs.

New Christmas carols and hymns were written and these, with older pieces, formed Carols for Today (Hodder & Stoughton, 1986). The book included Christmas readings. In 2006 this was superseded by a new concept for the group: a looseleaf publication of new and traditional Christmas words and music. It was published in 2006 by Royal School of Church Music as The Carol Book.

== Makeup and functions ==
There are, as of 2009, over 60 lyricists and composers in The Jubilate Group. The Jubilate Group administers copyright for its members. However, distinct from many other copyright agencies, agency members retain their copyright and the Group’s role is to administer these to the copyright holders’ benefit.

The Jubilate Group website contains both the texts and the tunes of many hymns and songs appearing in its books.

== Board of directors ==
As of 2011, the board of directors is made up of Steve James (chairman), Noël Tredinnick (vice chairman), Sam Hargreaves, David Iliff and David Peacock.
