= Michael Saward (priest) =

British hymnwriter (1932–2015)

- Born: Michael John Saward; 14 May 1932; Blackheath, London
- Died: 31 January 2015 (aged 82); Switzerland
- Spouse: Jacqueline Atkinson
- Children: Rachel Saward; Joe Saward; Jill Saward; Sue Saward
- Relatives: Henry George Kendall (grandfather)
- Church: Church of England

Michael John Saward (14 May 1932 – 31 January 2015) was a British Anglican priest, author and hymnodist. He was a member of the General Synod of the Church of England from 1975 to 1995 and was Canon Treasurer of St Paul's Cathedral from 1991 to 2000. He was part of a group of clergy who, under the leadership of John Stott, revived evangelicalism in the Church of England.

== Early life ==
Saward was born on 14 May 1932 in Blackheath, London, England. He was educated at a dame school in Petts Wood, London, and at Eltham College, a private school in Mottingham, London. He became a practising Christian in 1946.

Saward served in the British Army as part of National Service. He was commissioned into the Royal Regiment of Artillery on 26 May 1951 as a second lieutenant.

From 1951 to 1952, he served in Accra, Ghana, as part of the Royal West African Frontier Force. On 15 March 1953, he was transferred to the Territorial Army and granted the acting rank of lieutenant. On 14 May 1955, he was transferred to the Territorial Army Reserve of Officers and promoted to the substantive rank of lieutenant. He was transferred to the Regular Army Reserve of Officers on 7 March 1956. He resigned his commission on 8 September 1956.

Having returned to England from Ghana in 1952, Saward began studying theology at the University of Bristol. He graduated with a Bachelor of Arts (BA) degree in 1955. Having felt called to Holy Orders during his military service, he then studied for the priesthood at Tyndale Hall which was, at that time, affiliated to the University of Bristol.

== Ordained ministry ==
Saward was ordained deacon in 1956 and priest in 1957 at Canterbury Cathedral by Geoffrey Fisher, Archbishop of Canterbury.

He served as a curate in Croydon and Edgware, two London suburbs. He was the secretary of the Liverpool Council of Churches from 1964 to 1967. He then became the Radio and Television Officer to Archbishop Michael Ramsey, remaining in the post until 1972. He was then vicar of St Matthew's Fulham until 1978 and then vicar of St Mary's Ealing (1978–91). He also became president of the House of Clergy of the Willesden Area Synod. Until his retirement at the end of 2000 he was Canon Treasurer of St Paul's Cathedral in London.

In the mid-1980s he was an object of attacks by the magazine Private Eye, to which his replies elicited more attacks. On 6 March 1986, a gang of burglars broke into the Saward family's home at lunchtime. Saward and his daughter Jill's then-boyfriend, David Kerr, were tied up and beaten, both suffering fractured skulls, while Jill (who died in 2017) was raped. Jill became an author and campaigner for victims of rape and sexual violence. She was the first rape victim in England to waive anonymity.

Canon Saward served on many councils and committees, among which were the General Synod (1975–1995), the Church Commissioners (1978–93) and the Church of England's Evangelical Council (1976–93). He served as Chairman of the Billy Graham London Mission 1989 Media Task Group, a judge of The Times "Preacher of the Year" competition in 2000 and as religious adviser to the film Cromwell (1970).

== Author ==
Saward began writing pamphlets about different aspects of church life in the 1960s, mainly for Scripture Union, before embarking on books such as Don't Miss the Party (1974) and the controversial And So To Bed? (1975), which examined Christian views about sex. This was followed by Cracking the God Code (1978), God's Friends: Romans (1978) and All Change (1983).

In later years Saward concentrated on writing hymns, contributing to many hymn books and editing Come Celebrate, a compilation of modern hymn writing, in 2009. Saward's autobiography, A Faint Streak of Humility, was published in 1999.

=== Hymn writer ===
Saward wrote over a hundred hymns, of which "Christ triumphant, ever reigning" is his best known, usually sung to the hymn tune "Guiting Power" (named after the village of Guiting Power in Gloucestershire) by John Barnard. A long-term member of the Jubilate Group of hymnwriters, Saward was also its chairman from 1999 to 2001. He was part of what has been described as a British "hymn explosion" since World War II.

Saward was an active member of the Hymn Society of Great Britain and Ireland, serving on its executive committee.

== Later life ==
Though retired from the church appointments, Saward continued to minister. He was granted a permission to officiate in the Diocese of London from 2002 and in the Diocese of Rochester from 2013. At the time of his death, he had preached in hundreds of churches across the world, including the United States, on the Queen Elizabeth 2 cruise ship and twice at the Tower of London.

== Death ==
On 31 January 2015, Canon Saward was found dead in his room at a hotel in Switzerland by staff members. He was 82 years old.

== Personal life ==
Canon Saward was married to Jacqueline Atkinson (1932–2009) and was the father of Rachel, Joe (a Formula One motorsport journalist), Jill (died 2017) and Sue (Jill and Sue were twins).

Canon Saward was also a holder of a Winston Churchill Travelling Fellowship, a Freeman of the City of London and a member of the Athenaeum Club, London.

Saward's grandfather was Henry George Kendall, the first person to use radio to capture a criminal; he recognised the murderer, Hawley Harvey Crippen, who was attempting to escape the UK on Kendall's liner.

== Bibliography ==
- A Faint Streak of Humility, autobiography
- Christ Triumphant, a hymn collection published by the Jubilate Group

Business positions
| Preceded by Michael Baughen | Chairman of Jubilate Group; 1999–2001 | Succeeded by Steve James |
