= Michael Perry (hymnwriter) =

British clergyman and hymnwriter

- Born: 8 March 1942; Beckenham, Kent
- Died: 9 December 1996 (aged 54); Tonbridge, Kent
- Education: Dulwich College; University College London; Oak Hill Theological College; Ridley Hall, Cambridge
- Spouse: Beatrice Mary (m. 1967)
- Children: Helen Perry; Simon Perry
- Church: Church of England
- Writings: The Dramatised Bible

Michael Arnold Perry (8 March 1942 – 9 December 1996) was a Church of England clergyman and one of the leading British hymnodists of the 20th century. He was closely associated with Jubilate Hymns.

== Early life ==
Michael Perry was born in Beckenham, Kent on 8 March 1942. He was educated at Dulwich College and went on to study at University College London; Oak Hill Theological College, London; Ridley Hall, Cambridge; and University of Southampton.

It was during his student days at Oak Hill in 1964 that Perry wrote his best-known hymn, the Calypso Carol, the first line of which is "See him lying on a bed of straw". He wrote this for a college concert, and it only became famous by accident when Cliff Richard substituted it for a missing recording in a radio show.

== Ministry ==
After ordination in the Church of England Diocese of Liverpool, Perry ministered at St Helens, Merseyside. He moved to Bitterne, Southampton, Hampshire, where he was curate and then vicar. During his time at Bitterne he was on the committees that produced the popular hymn books Psalm Praise (1973) and Hymns for Today's Church (1982).

From 1981 to 1989 Perry served as Rector of Eversley, Hampshire. In 1982 he became Secretary of Jubilate Hymns, and was involved in editing most of their books. In addition, he worked as Chaplain and lecturer at the National Police Staff College, Bramshill. He was also elected to the Church of England's General Synod in 1985.

Perry's last posting was as Vicar of St Peter & St Paul, Tonbridge in his native Kent from 1989 until 1996. He was appointed Chairman of the Church Pastoral Aid Society in 1993, and again to the General Synod in 1994.

== Personal life ==
Perry married Beatrice Mary at St Helens Parish Church in 1967. They had two children, Helen and Simon.

From early 1996 Perry was increasingly disabled by an inoperable brain tumour. He died at home on 9 December 1996.

== Legacy ==
His contemporary, hymn-writer Christopher Idle, paid tribute to Perry's compositions, his constructive criticism of others' works, and his business acumen in "sorting out what had been a copyright jungle" (referring to critics who expected songwriters to make no charge since their work was "for the Lord"). He concluded that few people matched Perry's influence on evangelical praise and worship over the 1970s to '90s.

== Selected works ==
Perry wrote over 300 hymns. The following works are a selection.

Hymns

- "See him lying on a bed of straw" (Calypso Carol)
- "O God Beyond All Praising" (to Holst's melody Thaxted)
- "Bring to the Lord a Glad New Song" (to Hubert Parry's tune Jerusalem)
- "When the angel came to Mary" (to the Sans Day Carol)
- Fling wide the gates, unbar the ancient doors (chorus line) (based on Psalm 24)

Books

- The Dramatised Bible
- Preparing for Worship, Zondervan 1995, ISBN 978-0-551-02895-1
- Singing to God, Hope Publications, 1995. ISBN 978-0-916642-59-4. His own collected hymns
