= Chinese New Hymnal =

Protestant hymn book in China

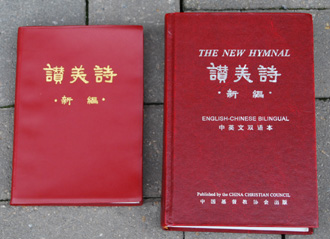
The Chinese New Hymnal (left, published by China Christian Council and printed by Amity Printing Co., Ltd) and The English-Chinese Bilingual New Hymnal (right, ditto)

The Chinese New Hymnal (simplified Chinese: 赞美诗（新编）; traditional Chinese: 讚美詩（新編）; pinyin: Zànměishī (Xīnbiān)) was published in the early 1980s and is the main hymnal used by the Protestant churches registered through the TSPM in present-day China.

== History ==
The Chinese New Hymnal was begun being edited in the 1980s when persecution against religion, especially against Christianity, during the Cultural Revolution subsided and churches were reopened, with the intention to collect both domestic and overseas hymns. Its "Simple notation (in simplified Chinese: 简谱; traditional Chinese: 簡譜; pinyin: jianpu) version", using the numbered musical notation system, was published in 1983 and "staff musical notation version" in 1985. The former version is predominantly used in the present-day China. Editors include Lin Shengben, a renowned Chinese hymn composer.

The Chinese New Hymnal includes 400 hymns, with the addendum of 40 "Short Songs". In addition to the songs from Europe and the Americas, special effort was made to collect the songs written by the Chinese people, such as those from Wang Weifan, T. C. Chao, and Lin Shengben. It was printed by Amity Printing Co. and published by China Christian Council. "The English-Chinese Bilingual New Hymnal" was later published in 1998.

This hymnal features two indexes. The first one arranges hymns according to the first notes in the melody and the second one to the first line of text.

The Protestant churches in the present-day China almost exclusively select the worship songs from this hymn book. A new printing of the Chinese Union Version Bible by the Amity Foundation in 2004 also incorporates this hymnal under the same volume. Some of the Chinese-written songs have been adopted by the hymnals of other countries.

An additional collection of 200 songs used in worship have been compiled and published as a separate volume in October 2009. This addition contains some much-needed titles suited for various occasions as well as newly written pieces. About a quarter of the titles are locally made and the remainder are imported and Chinese lyrics set. The songs are indexed twice in the same fashion as its predecessor. Versions both in numerical and staff notation versions are available. Most of the titles were copyrighted at time of publication.

Songs in other hymnals are simpler and thus illiterate and under-educated people prefer hymnals like the Canaan Hymns, used widely in the Chinese house churches.

== Protestant worship in China ==
The Chinese Union Version of the Bible, the Chinese New Hymnal, the Lord's Prayer as it is written in the Chinese Union Version and the Apostles' Creed are usually used in the Three-Self churches in China.

== See also ==
- List of Chinese hymn books
- Christianity in China
- Protestantism in China
- Hymns and Hymnals
- China Christian Council
- Numbered musical notation
- Chinese Union Version of the Bible
