= Lu Xiaomin =

Chinese Christian hymnwriter

Lü Xiaomin or Ruth Lu (Chinese: 吕小敏; pinyin: Lǚ Xiǎomǐn; born 1970) is the author of over 1,800 Canaan Hymns, popular among churches in China today.

== Biography ==
Lü Xiaomin was born in 1970 to a family of peasants belonging to the Hui minority. She grew up in Fangcheng, Nanyang, Henan Province.

Lü dropped out of education after elementary school because of her failing health. Because the Hui are China's largest Muslim community, she was initially unfamiliar with Christianity. Her aunt, who had converted to Christianity, introduced her to the faith. After praying, her health condition, sinusitis and a stomach disease, were gone. Lü joined a house church in 1989, at the age of 19, taking the christian name "Sister Ruth". Her spiritual roots are in Pentecostalism and the local churches movement.

== Canaan Hymns ==
In 1990, she started composing hymns. The first hymn came to her mind one night after church service when she could not sleep. According to Lü: "The Holy Spirit touched me the moment I consecrated myself to God. That's when I sang my first hymn." Shy as she was, she only sang the song to a girl in her home village. The girl relayed the hymn to her parents, Christians who attributed Lü's sudden musical abilities to the work of the Holy Spirit. By the time that word about Lü's song had reached a fellow Christian with a tape recorder, she had already written 23 hymns. All of them were taped and marked down in Chinese musical notation. Soon all of the local congregations were using the hymnal and traveling evangelists took it all over China.

Lü continued to compose new hymns, one every two or three days. During the next decade of her life, she would write some 700 of them while evangelizing in the countryside of Henan. During this period, she was detained at least twice for her religious activities. The first arrest took place in September 1992 in Fangcheng after she had written 50 songs. During her 67-day detention, she composed 14 additional hymns and her seven non-Christian cellmates had become converted to Christianity. The other arrest came after a 1998 reinterpretation of the illegal publications clause of the Constitution of China.

As of July 2017, there are 1,810 Canaan hymns.
