= Divie Bethune McCartee =

American diplomat (1820–1900)

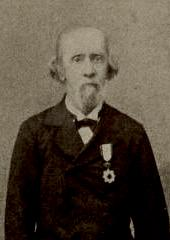
- Protestant Missionary to China
- Born: January 13, 1820; Philadelphia, Pennsylvania, United States
- Died: July 17, 1900 (aged 80); San Francisco, California, United States
- Education: Columbia University, University of Pennsylvania
- Title: A. M., M. D.
- Spouses: Juana M. McCartee (née Knight)
- Parent(s): Robert McCartee (1791-1865); Jessie Graham (1796-1855)

Divie Bethune McCartee (Simplified Chinese: 麦嘉缔) (1820–1900) was an American Protestant Christian medical missionary, educator and U.S. diplomat in China and Japan, first appointed by the American Presbyterian Mission in 1843.

In 1845, he organized the first Protestant church on Chinese soil. He later served as United States Consul at Ningbo, China and was also judge of the "mixed court" at Shanghai. His career in Japan led him to be a professor in the Imperial University at Tokyo, and he was also Secretary of the Chinese legation there. His prolific writings covered Asiatic history, linguistics, natural science, medicine and politics in the publications of the American Geographical Society, the American Oriental Society and other associations.

== Early life ==
Divie Bethune McCartee was born in Philadelphia on January 13, 1820, the oldest son of Dr. Robert McCartee of New York. He entered Columbia University, New York City, at the age of 14 and graduated from the University of Pennsylvania Medical School at 20. In June 1843, while engaged in the practice of medicine in Philadelphia, he received a message from the Board of Foreign Missions of the Church that he was needed to go to China as a pioneer and medical missionary. After consulting with members of his family, he agreed to go.

== China ==
McCartee sailed for China in 1843 and arrived in Ningbo, Zhejiang, China in 1844. He began working primarily in medicine and evangelism. He was likely the first Protestant missionary, and certainly the first physician, to reside on Chinese soil following the First Opium War. He soon mastered the Chinese language, and his linguistic skills would be put to a variety of future uses. He opened a mission at Ningbo, one of the five ports opened to foreign trade and intercourse by the Treaty of Nanking in 1842.

In 1845, he organized the first Protestant church on Chinese soil. It was there that he married fellow missionary, Juana M. Knight in 1853. She was the first single Presbyterian woman to travel to China.

In 1868 or 1869, the McCartees adopted Kin Yamei (1864–1934), the daughter of Christian colleagues who died from disease when she was two years old. She became the first Chinese woman doctor educated abroad.

In addition to his medical work, he became an adviser and interpreter for American officials and was later vice-consul in Chefoo (present-day Yantai) and Shanghai. McCartee acted in place of an American Consul until a regular consular service was set up in 1857. In this capacity in May 1861, at the request of United States Flag-Officer Stribling, he entered Nanjing, across the battle lines and helped persuade the "Heavenly King", Hong Xiuquan of the Taipings to promise "non-molestation not only to Americans and Christians, but to all Chinese in their employ." By this effort large numbers of native Christians and their friends were rescued when the Taiping army entered Ningbo.

== Japan ==
In 1862, he was appointed vice-consul to Japan and became one of the first Protestant missionaries to work there. His tract translated into Japanese was the first Protestant literature in Japan.

The McCartees returned to Ningpo in 1865 to resume their missionary work. In 1872, they were transferred to the Shanghai mission but resigned shortly thereafter so that Dr. McCartee could join the Shanghai consular staff as interpreter and assessor to the Mixed Court.

In 1872, when the coolies of the Peruvian ship Maria Luz were freed by the Japanese government upon his suggestion, a commission was appointed from Beijing to proceed to Tokyo to bring home the freed men, and McCartee was nominated secretary and interpreter, receiving for his services a gold medal and complimentary letters. While on this Chinese government assignment to Japan, McCartee remained in Tokyo as professor of law and science at the Imperial University (now Tokyo University), curator of the botanical gardens, and later secretary to the Chinese Legation there until 1877.

In 1879, he advised Ulysses S. Grant, the former U.S. president, mediating on the Ryukyu Islands, although both China and Japan rejected his compromise.

McCartee returned to the United States in 1880, and in 1882, visited Hawaii on business connected with Chinese immigration. In 1885, Dr. McCartee was appointed consul to the Japanese legation in Washington, DC. Two years later, the McCartees were reappointed by the Presbyterian Board of Foreign Missions to the Japan Mission, where they served until Dr. McCartee's retirement in 1899. That year, he returned to the US as an invalid, and died in San Francisco on July 17, 1900.

Divie McCartee devoted nearly forty years of his life to work among the Chinese and Japanese. The Chinese Government gave him a gold medal in recognition of his services in connection with the suppression of the Macau coolie traffic, and later he received the title of Consul General for services in the Chinese legation. From the Japanese Government he received the decoration of the Fifth Order of the Rising Sun. He left a wife and four brothers-Peter, Robert, George, and Charles McCartee. His remains were buried at Newburgh, New York.

== Archival collections ==
- The Presbyterian Historical Society in Philadelphia, Pennsylvania, has a collection of Divie Bethune McCartee's correspondence.
- The University of Pennsylvania's Rare Book and Manuscript Library has a collection of handwritten notes by McCartee on Chinese and Japanese archaeology, geography, natural history, philology and other topics.
- The Academy of Natural Sciences of Drexel University has zoological specimens sent from China by McCartee.

== See also ==
- Protestantism in Japan
