= Canaan Hymns =

Collection of hymns composed by Lü Xiaomin

- Released: Continuous since 1990
- No. of Hymns: 1,810 as of July 2017

Canaan Hymns
- Traditional Chinese: 迦南詩選
- Simplified Chinese: 迦南诗选
Transcriptions
Standard Mandarin
- Hanyu Pinyin: Jiānán Shīxuǎn

Canaan Hymns or Songs of Canaan (Chinese: 迦南诗选; pinyin: Jiānán Shīxuǎn) is a collection of Chinese hymns composed by Lü Xiaomin, beginning in 1990. Lü Xiaomin is a daughter of peasants of the Hui minority born in 1970, who converted to Christianity. Lü's theological background is in Pentecostalism and the local churches movement, and the hymns reflect themes of Christology, pneumatology and eschatology against the backdrop of Chinese political realities.

Canaan hymns are one of the most successful underground Christian publication in China. They are used by many Protestant churches in the country. Both Chinese house churches and churches of the Three-Self Patriotic Movement use them, despite the latter having criticized the hymns through its official channels. The Chinese government has targeted censorship efforts on the distributors of the hymnal. Overseas Chinese communities and Taiwanese churches use the hymnal, too.

Even people with little education can learn the hymns, which are short and musically simple, usually rhymed, and resemble Chinese folk songs. This has contributed to their popularity. The hymns can also be sung without instruments. Their Chinese elements and Confucian undertones make them more acceptable than foreign hymnals to Chinese worshipers. There is a strong emphasis on the communal aspects of the Christian church. Some hymns are patriotic.

As of July 2017, there are 1,810 Canaan hymns.

== Use ==
The songs are extremely popular all over China. They are used by many Protestant Chinese churches, both in the People's Republic of China and in Taiwan and have been published in both countries. Overseas Chinese communities use them as well.

Canaan hymns are one of the most successful underground Christian publication in China. They are predominantly used in the Chinese house churches, where they are considered its "official hymnal". They also see use in the government-sanctioned Three-Self Patriotic Movement churches. Through its official channels, the Three-Self Patriotic Movement has criticized the hymns. A 1999 issue of its Tian Feng magazine scrutinized the hymn 195, "Lord, Have Mercy on China, Hold Back Your Anger", in particular for questioning the Movement's view of Christianity in service of Chinese socialism. The government has targeted publishers and distributors of the hymnal.

Neither Lü nor anyone in her family has any formal musical training. She does not know how to write either Western or Chinese musical notation. Initially, her hymns spread mainly orally, but they have since begun to be transcribed by others. Orchestral adaptations of the hymns have made Lü famous overseas as well. Her life story and the hymns are inseparable in publicity, reflecting a holiness theology on part of the movement. Described as "profoundly modest" despite her fame in China, Lü spends much time traveling around the country. Her music is publicized by Chinese American backers in particular.

The 2012 Chinese film Back to 1942 featured the Canaan hymn "The River of Life" as its theme song. The hymn "I Love My Home" has also appeared on China Central Television, sung by a Christian family, despite the channel's reputation as propaganda of the officially atheist state.

Many Chinese regard the Canaan hymns a gift from God. Chinese Christians have attributed miraculous healings to those singing the hymns.

== Musical and theological features ==
My Lord leads me into His gates
Our loving words flow endlessly
Our love is as strong as death
Many waters cannot quench it
My Lord is radiant
Outstanding among all others
I am His and He is mine
We will never part
He takes me to the fields
He takes me to the vineyards
He feeds His flock among the lilies
I am with Him forever

— "The Lord and I" (Canaan hymn 85)

The Canaan hymns are short, pentatonic and resemble Chinese folk songs. Many, but not all, are rhymed. Few have verses or refrains. There are many allusions to nature and the weather. They are "genuinely inculturated hymns, with a folk lilt, Chinese harmonics, and an imagery that blends rural China with biblical themes". The spontaneity of the hymns reflect the process that Lü uses to compose her hymns: she develops songs based on Bible verses that come to her mind while praying, as a plea to a local need or as thanks. Conceiving a new hymn can take as little as five to ten minutes. The songs are simple, "a few lines of doxology or lament"; the figures of speech used are everyday and rural. The songs are easier to learn than those featured in the Chinese New Hymnal, the official hymnal of the state-controlled China Christian Council. Even uneducated and illiterate people can grasp the Canaan hymns, which has contributed to their popularity. They can be sung without instrumentation, and are sung in church, at home gatherings, and when alone.

The songs are Christologically and pneumatologically focused, even if most of the Biblical references are to the Old Testament, especially the Book of Psalms. The lyrics of the hymns are theologically mindful of a tension between China's political realities and aspirations of Chinese Christians. These thoughts are reflected on the Second Coming of Jesus and there is a strong eschatological current. Early hymns in particular focused on the theme of overcoming hardships. The hymnody reflects a kind of "enduring acceptance of state persecution."

Their Chinese elements and Confucian undertones make them more acceptable than foreign hymnals to Chinese audiences. There is a strong emphasis on the communal aspects of the Christian church. Some hymns, such as "Chinese Heart" (134) and "The Chinese shall Rise" (180), are markedly patriotic. Canaan hymns also exhibit the "Three self principles" that are central to Chinese Protestantism, "self-governance, self-reliance, and self-propagation", often supplemented with a fourth one: "ingeniousness". These aspects make Canaan hymns compatible with government-sanctioned Christianity. Some have the air of work songs, and even contain mimicry of Cultural Revolution era propaganda songs.

== See also ==
- Chinese New Hymnal
- List of Chinese hymn books
- Political music in China
- Protestantism in China
