= Michael Baughen =

Anglican bishop

The Right Reverend Michael Baughen
- Bishop of Chester
- Church: Church of England
- Diocese: Diocese of Chester
- Installed: 1982
- Term ended: 1996 (retirement)
- Predecessor: Victor Whitsey
- Successor: Peter Forster

Orders
- Ordination: 1956
- Consecration: 1982

Personal details
- Born: 7 June 1930 (age 95)
- Denomination: Anglican
- Occupation: Bishop, hymnist

Michael Alfred Baughen (born 7 June 1930) is a retired Anglican bishop.

Born in Borehamwood, Hertfordshire, he was educated at Bromley County Grammar School, the University of London and Oak Hill Theological College.

After ordination, he served as Rector of Holy Trinity Church in Platt Lane, Rusholme, Manchester and All Souls, Langham Place in London. He served as the 39th Bishop of Chester between 1982 and 1996. Following his retirement, he worked as an honorary assistant bishop in the Diocese of London and in the Diocese of Southwark.

Baughen is also noted for his contribution to hymnody. He is particularly known for his tune "Lord of the Years" for Timothy Dudley-Smith's hymn "Lord for the Years". He is also well known as editor of and writer and composer for Youth Praise (Book 1, 1964, and Book 2, 1969) and Psalm Praise (1973), and for Hymns for Today's Church (Jubilate Hymns, 1982), for which he was consultant editor and contributor, and as Editorial Chairman of Sing Glory (2000).

Business positions
| New post | Chairman of the Jubilate Group; 1980–1999 | Succeeded by Michael Saward |
Church of England titles
| Preceded by Victor Whitsey | Bishop of Chester; 1982–1996 | Succeeded by Peter Forster |
