= Timothy Dudley-Smith =

Anglican bishop and hymnwriter (1926–2024)

The Right Reverend Timothy Dudley-Smith OBE
- Bishop of Thetford
- Dudley-Smith in 2020.
- Diocese: Norwich
- In office: 1981–1992
- Predecessor: Hugh Blackburne
- Successor: Hugo de Waal
- Other posts: Honorary assistant bishop in Salisbury (1992–2024); Archdeacon of Norwich (1973–1981)

Orders
- Ordination: 1950 (deacon); 1951 (priest)
- Consecration: 1981

Personal details
- Born: 26 December 1926 Manchester, England
- Died: 12 August 2024 (aged 97) Cambridge, England
- Denomination: Anglican
- Parents: Arthur and Phyllis Dudley-Smith
- Spouse: June Arlette MacDonald (m. 1959; died 2007)
- Children: 3
- Profession: Bishop, hymnist
- Education: Pembroke College, Cambridge

Timothy Dudley-Smith OBE (26 December 1926 – 12 August 2024) was a bishop of the Church of England and a noted hymnwriter. He wrote around 400 hymns, including "Tell Out, My Soul".

== Early life and education ==
Dudley-Smith was born on 26 December 1926 in Manchester, England, to Phyllis and Arthur Smith. His father was a schoolteacher in Derbyshire who instilled in Dudley-Smith a love for poetry. Arthur fell ill and died when Dudley-Smith was eleven years old and shortly thereafter, he desired to be a minister. He was educated at Tonbridge School before studying maths and then theology at Pembroke College, Cambridge. After graduating in 1947, he began his ordination training at Ridley Hall, Cambridge.

== Ministry ==
Dudley-Smith was ordained deacon in 1950 and priest in 1951 by Christopher Chavasse, the Bishop of Rochester. After ordination, he served as a curate in Northumberland Heath from 1950 to 1953 and as an honorary chaplain to Chavasse. He later served as head of the Cambridge University Mission in Bermondsey, a boys club located in South London. In 1955, he was appointed editor and education secretary of the Evangelical Alliance and editor of the new Crusade magazine, created after Billy Graham's 1954 London mission. After leaving the Evangelical alliance in 1959, Dudley-Smith began serving with the Church Pastoral Aid Society, first as assistant secretary, and then as general secretary from 1965 until 1973. While serving there, Dudley-Smith started writing hymns, including "Tell Out, My Soul", written at Blackheath, London, in May 1961, with his first published hymns appearing in the 1965 Anglican Hymnbook. He also published the hymnals Youth Praise (1966; 1969) and Psalm Praise (1973). Dudley-Smith was part of what has been described as a British "hymn explosion" after World War II.

From 1973 to 1981, Dudley-Smith served as Archdeacon of Norwich and as Bishop of Thetford from 1981 to 1991. He also served as president of the Evangelical Alliance from 1987 to 1992. He was chairman of the governors of Monkton Combe School from 1992 to 1997.

== Personal life ==
In 1959, he married June Arlette MacDonald, a junior Wimbledon competitor and former day care worker. They were together for 48 years until her death in 2007 and they had one son and two daughters. His son, James, is also ordained in the Church of England, and as of August 2024, serves as rector of St John's Church, Yeovil. Dudley-Smith died in Cambridge on 12 August 2024, at the age of 97.

== Honours ==
Dudley-Smith was a member and honorary vice-president of the Hymn Society of Great Britain and Ireland; he was also awarded fellowships from the Hymn Society in the United States and Canada and the Royal School of Church Music. In 2003, he was appointed an Officer of the Order of the British Empire "for services to hymnody". In July 2009 he was awarded an honorary Doctor of Divinity degree by Durham University.

== Selected works ==
- Dudley-Smith, Timothy (1987). A Flame of Love: A Personal Choice of Charles Wesley's Verse. London: SPCK. ISBN 9780281043002.
- —————— (1989). Praying with the English Hymn Writers. London: SPCK. ISBN 9780281044337.
- —————— (1999). John Stott: The Making of a Leader. London: IVP. ISBN 9780830822072.
- —————— (2001). John Stott: A Global Ministry. London: IVP. ISBN 9780851119830.
- ——————; Dakers, Lionel (2001). Beneath a Travelling Star. Canterbury, UK: Canterbury Press. ISBN 9781853114496.
- —————— (2003). A House of Praise: Collected Hymns 1961–2001. Oxford: Oxford University Press. ISBN 9780191001598.
- —————— (2006). A Door for the Word: 36 new hymns 2002–2005. Oxford: Oxford University Press. ISBN 9780193355873.
- ——————; Llewellyn, William (2006). A Calendar of Praise. Canterbury, UK: Canterbury Press. ISBN 9781853117558.
- ——————; Llewellyn, William (2007). High Days and Holy Days. Canterbury, UK: Canterbury Press. ISBN 9781853118197.
- ——————; Llewellyn, William (2008). The Voice of Faith. Canterbury, UK: Canterbury Press. ISBN 9781853119095.
- ——————; Llewellyn, William (2009). Above Every Name. Canterbury, UK: Canterbury Press. ISBN 9781853119781.
- —————— (2009). Snakes and Ladders: A Hymn Writer's Reflections. London: The Hymn Society of Great Britain and Ireland. ISBN 9781907018008.
- —————— (2009). Praise to the Name: 36 New Hymns 2005–2008. Oxford: Oxford University Press. ISBN 9780193365889.
- ——————; Llewellyn, William (2010). Draw Near to God. Canterbury, UK: Canterbury Press. ISBN 9781848250222.
- —————— (2012). Beyond Our Dreaming: 36 New Hymns 2008–2011. Oxford: Oxford University Press. ISBN 9780193380011.
- —————— (2015). A House of Praise 2: Collected Hymns 2002–2013. Oxford: Oxford University Press. ISBN 9780193403772.
- —————— (2017). A Functional Art: Reflections of a Hymn Writer. Oxford: Oxford University Press. ISBN 9780193408715.
- —————— (2019). A House of Praise 3: Collected Hymns 2013–2018. Oxford: Oxford University Press. ISBN 9780193529526.

Church of England titles
Preceded by Hugh Blackburne	Bishop of Thetford; 1981–1992	Succeeded by Hugo de Waal
Religious titles
Unknown	President of the Evangelical Alliance; 1987–1992	Succeeded by Fred Catherwood
