= Classic 100 Original (ABC) =

During 2001 and 2002, the Australian radio station ABC Classic FM held a Classic 100 countdown.

Voting for the countdown was held in 2001, with votes cast by listeners to the station.

The broadcasting of the results of the countdown began on 12 December 2001 and concluded on 19 January 2002.

== Survey summary ==
The results of the countdown are as follows:

Rank	Composer	Work
100	Fauré	Cantique de Jean Racine
99	Khachaturian	Spartacus
98	Grieg	Morning from Peer Gynt
97	Stravinsky	The Rite of Spring
96	Mozart	Piano Concerto No. 20 in D minor
95	Handel	Zadok the Priest
94	Albinoni	Adagio in G minor for organ and strings
93	Debussy	Clair de lune
92	Purcell	When I am laid in earth (Dido's Lament) from Dido and Aeneas
91	Tchaikovsky	Violin Concerto in D major
90	Sibelius	Finlandia
89	Mendelssohn	Violin Concerto in E minor
88	Bach	The Well-Tempered Clavier
87	Beethoven	Piano Concerto No. 4 in G major
86	Beethoven	Piano Sonata No. 8 in C minor, Pathétique
85	Mozart	"Soave sia il vento" from Così fan tutte
84	Mozart	Clarinet Quintet in A major
83	Orff	Carmina Burana
82	Satie	Gymnopédies
81	Ravel	Boléro
80	Beethoven	Symphony No. 7 in A major
79	Bach	Toccata and Fugue in D minor
78	Puccini	"O mio babbino caro" from Gianni Schicchi
77	Schubert	Impromptu No. 3 in G♭ major
76	Mahler	Symphony No. 8 in E♭ major
75	Verdi	La traviata
74	Tchaikovsky	Piano Concerto No. 1 in B♭ minor
73	Gershwin	Rhapsody in Blue
72	Bach	Chaconne from Violin Partita No. 2 in D minor
71	Chopin	Piano Concerto No. 1 in E minor
70	Bach	Christmas Oratorio
69	Beethoven	Piano Trio No. 7 in B♭, Archduke
68	Grieg	Piano Concerto in A minor
67	Mozart	The Marriage of Figaro
66	Caccini, G / Vavilov	Ave Maria
65	Elgar	Sea Pictures
64	Litolff, HC	Concerto symphonique No. 4 in D minor, Scherzo
63	Bach	Cantata No 78, Jesu, der du meine Seele
62	Mahler	Symphony No. 2 in C minor, Resurrection
61	Tchaikovsky	1812 Overture
60	Smetana	My Country
59	Elgar	Pomp and Circumstance March No. 1 in D major
58	Prokofiev	Romeo and Juliet
57	Mozart	Ave verum corpus
56	Bach	Goldberg Variations
55	Dvořák	Song to the Moon from Rusalka
54	Mozart	The Magic Flute
53	Handel	Ombra mai fu (Handel's Largo) from Serse
52	Dvořák	Symphony No. 9 in E minor, From the New World
51	Rachmaninoff	Rhapsody on a Theme of Paganini
50	Saint-Saëns	The Swan from The Carnival of the Animals
49	Holst	The Planets
48	Mozart	Serenade No. 13 in G major, Eine kleine Nachtmusik
47	Wagner	Liebestod from Tristan und Isolde
46	Gluck	Che farò senza Euridice? from Orfeo ed Euridice
45	Saint-Saëns	Symphony No. 3 in C minor, Organ Symphony
44	Verdi	Messa da Requiem
43	Mahler	Symphony No. 5 in C♯ minor
42	Beethoven	Symphony No. 5 in C minor
41	Schubert	"To Music"
40	Beethoven	Symphony No. 3 in E♭ major, Eroica
39	Massenet	Meditation from Thaïs
38	Puccini	Madama Butterfly
37	Verdi	Chorus of the Hebrew Slaves from Nabucco
36	Barber	Adagio for Strings
35	Bach	Concerto for 2 Violins, Strings and Continuo in D Minor
34	Bach	"Air on the G String", from Suite No. 3 in D major
33	Puccini	La bohème
32	Mozart	Requiem Mass in D minor
31	Mozart	Piano Concerto No. 21 in C major
30	Mascagni	Intermezzo from Cavalleria rusticana
29	Bach	Mass in B minor
28	Schubert	String Quintet in C major
27	Beethoven	Piano Sonata No. 14 in C♯ minor, Moonlight
26	Mozart	Piano Concerto No. 23 in A major
25	Vaughan Williams	Fantasia on a Theme by Thomas Tallis
24	Elgar	Enigma Variations
23	Pachelbel	Pachelbel's Canon
22	Bach	Brandenburg Concertos
21	Rodrigo	Concierto de Aranjuez
20	Bach	Six Suites for Unaccompanied Cello
19	Elgar	Cello Concerto in E minor
18	Schubert	Piano Quintet in A major, Trout
17	Schubert	Notturno in E♭ major, Op. 148 (D. 897)
16	Vivaldi	The Four Seasons
15	Fauré	Requiem
14	Bruch	Violin Concerto No. 1 in G minor
13	Rachmaninoff	Piano Concerto No. 2 in C minor
12	Bach	St Matthew Passion
11	Bach	Jesu, Joy of Man's Desiring
10	Strauss, R	Four Last Songs
9	Allegri, G	Miserere
8	Handel	Messiah
7	Bizet	Au fond du temple saint from The Pearl Fishers
6	Beethoven	Symphony No. 6 in F major, Pastoral
5	Beethoven	Violin Concerto in D Major
4	Beethoven	Piano Concerto No. 5 in E♭ major, Emperor Concerto
3	Beethoven	Symphony No. 9 in D minor
2	Vaughan Williams	The Lark Ascending
1	Mozart	Clarinet Concerto in A major

== By composer ==
The following 45 composers were featured in the countdown:

Composer	Nationality	Works
Albinoni	Italian	1
Allegri, G	Italian	1
Bach, JS	German	13
Barber	American	1
Beethoven	German	11
Bizet	French	2
Bruch	German	1
Caccini / Vavilov	Italian	1
Chopin	Polish	1
Debussy	French	1
Dvořák	Czech	2
Elgar	English	4
Fauré	French	2
Gershwin	American	1
Gluck	German	1
Grieg	Norwegian	2
Handel	German-British	3
Holst	English	1
Khachaturian	Armenian	1
Litolff	English	1
Mahler	Austrian	3
Mascagni	Italian	1
Massenet	French	1
Mendelssohn	German	1
Mozart	Austrian	11
Orff	German	1
Pachelbel	German	1
Prokofiev	Russian	1
Puccini	Italian	3
Purcell	English	1
Rachmaninoff	Russian	2
Ravel	French	1
Rodrigo	Spanish	1
Saint-Saëns	French	1
Satie	French	1
Schubert	Austrian	5
Sibelius	Finnish	1
Smetana	Czech	1
Strauss, R	German	1
Stravinsky	Russian	1
Tchaikovsky	Russian	3
Vaughan Williams	English	2
Verdi	Italian	3
Vivaldi	Italian	1
Wagner	German	1

== See also ==
- Classic 100 Countdowns
