= Classic 100 Swoon =

In 2015, the Australian radio station ABC Classic FM held the thirteenth of its annual Classic Music countdowns, during which the public votes for 100 favourite pieces. The chosen theme was "Swoon", which refers to a fainting and in this context is used to mean "little parcel of [musical] rapture" or music "that makes [the listeners'] world stand still." The Classic 100 Swoon countdown was broadcast in reverse order from 5 to 8 June.

== Countdown results ==
The results of the countdown are as follows:

Rank	Composer	Work	Genre	Date
1	Vaughan Williams, Ralph	The Lark Ascending	Violin, piano	1920
2	Mozart, Wolfgang Amadeus	Clarinet Concerto, K. 622 (Adagio)	Concerto	1791
3	Barber, Samuel	Adagio for Strings (orchestral and vocal versions)	Orchestra, Choral	1936
4	Pärt, Arvo	Spiegel im Spiegel	Tintinnabuli	1978
5	Allegri, Gregorio	Miserere	Choral	1630s
6	Massenet, Jules	"Méditation" from Thaïs	Orchestral	1894
7	Elgar, Edward	Enigma Variations Op. 36 (includes Variation 9, Nimrod)	Orchestral	1898–99
8	Morricone, Ennio	The Mission (Includes Gabriel's Oboe original version)	Film soundtrack	1986
9	Fauré, Gabriel	Requiem Op.48 (includes Introit and Kyrie, Pie Jesu, Agnus Dei et Lux Aeterna, In Paradisum)	Choral, mass	1887-90
10	Albinoni, Tomaso/Remo Giazotto	Adagio in G minor	Strings, organ	
11	Satie, Erik	Gymnopédies	Piano	1888
12	Elgar, Edward	Cello Concerto in E minor (includes Adagio)	Concerto, for cello	1919
13	Rachmaninoff, Sergei	Piano Concerto No. 2 (includes Adagio sostenuto)	Concerto, for piano	1900–01
14	Mahler, Gustav	Symphony No. 5 (includes Adagietto)	Symphony	1901–02
15	Beethoven, Ludwig van	Piano Concerto No. 5 in E♭ major	Symphony	1809–11
16	Mozart, Wolfgang Amadeus	Ave verum corpus, K. 618	Choral, motet	1791
17	Bizet, Georges	The Pearl Fishers (Includes "Au fond du temple saint", "Je crois entendre encore")	Opera	1863
18	Vaughan Williams, Ralph	Fantasia on a Theme by Thomas Tallis	Orchestral	1910
19	Strauss, Richard	Four Last Songs	Orchestral, with voice	1948
20	Shostakovich, Dmitri	The Gadfly Suite	Suite, orchestral	1955
21	Khachaturan, Aram	Spartacus (Adagio of Spartacus and Phrygia)	Ballet score	1954
22	Puccini, Giacomo	Madama Butterfly (includes "One Fine Day", "Humming Chorus")	Opera	1904
23	Rodrigo, Joaquín	Concierto de Aranjuez	Orchestral, with guitar	1939
24	Bruch, Max	Violin Concerto No. 1 in G minor	Concerto	1866
25	Bach, Johann Sebastian	St Matthew Passion BWV 244	Oratorio	1727
26	Mozart, Wolfgang Amadeus	Requiem in D minor K.626	Choral, Mass	1791
27	Pachelbel, Johann	Canon in D	Strings	
28	Bach, Johann Sebastian	Cello Suite No. 1 in G major BWV 1007 (includes Prelude)	Suite, cello	
29	Mozart, Wolfgang Amadeus	Piano Concerto No. 21 in C major K.467 (Includes Andante)	Concerto	1785
30	Purcell, Henry	Dido and Aeneas (includes "Dido's Lament")	Opera	1688
31	Mascagni, Pietro	Cavalleria rusticana	Opera	1890
32	Delibes, Léo	Lakmé	Opera	1881–81
33	Saint-Saëns, Camille	The Carnival of the Animals (includes "Aquarium", "The Swan")	Suite, chamber	1886
34	Rachmaninoff, Sergei	Rhapsody on a Theme of Paganini	Concerto, for piano	1934
35	Dvořák, Antonín	"O silver moon" from Rusalka	Opera, aria	1901
36	Westlake, Nigel	Antarctica Suite	Film soundtrack	1991
37	Verdi, Giuseppe	Nabucco	Opera	1841
38	Bach, Johann Sebastian	Concerto for two violins in D minor BWV 1043 (includes Allegro ma non-tanto)	Concerto, for violin	1717–23
39	Grieg, Edvard	Peer Gynt	Play incidental music	1875
40	Debussy, Claude	Suite Bergamasque (includes "Clair de Lune"; "Passepied")	Suite, piano	1905
41	Holst, Gustav	The Planets Op.32	Suite, orchestral	1914–16
42	Handel, George Frideric	Messiah HWV 56 (includes "Comfort Ye"; "I Know that my Redeemer Liveth")	Oratorio	1741
43	Tallis, Thomas	Spem in alium	Choral	c.1570
44	Mozart, Wolfgang Amadeus	Così fan tutte K.588 (includes soave sia il vento)	Opera	1790
45	Dvořák, Antonín	Symphony No. 9 Op. 45 "From the New World" (includes largo)	Symphony	1893
46	Tchaikovsky, Pyotr Ilyich	The Nutcracker Suite (Includes "Waltz of the Snowflakes"; "Danse Arabe"; "Waltz of the Flowers")	Suite, ballet score	1892
47	Jenkins, Karl	The Armed Man: A Mass for Peace	Choral, mass, orchestral	1999
48	Canteloube, Joseph	Songs of the Auvergne (includes Baïlèro)	Arranged folksongs	1923-30
49	Kats-Chernin, Elena	Wild Swans suite (includes Eliza's Aria and Green Leaf Prelude)	Ballet score	2003
50	Wagner, Richard	Tristan and Isolde (includes Prelude and Liebestod)	Opera	1857–59
51	Williams, John	Schindler's List (Main Theme)	Film soundtrack	1993
52	Edwards, Ross	Dawn Mantras	Orchestral, choral	1999
53	Beethoven, Ludwig van	Sonata No. 14 in C♯ minor, Op. 27, No. 2 Moonlight (includes I. Adagio sostenuto)	Sonata for piano	1801
54	Handel, George Frideric	Xerxes, HWV 40 (includes "Ombra Mai Fu" – Largo)	Opera	1738
55	Debussy, Claude	Prelude to the Afternoon of a Faun	Symphonic poem	1894
56	Sculthorpe, Peter	Small Town	Orchestral	1976
57	Pärt, Arvo	Cantus in Memoriam Benjamin Britten	Tintinnabuli	1977
58	Beethoven, Ludwig van	Violin Concerto in D Major, Op. 61 (includes II. Larghetto)	Concerto, for violin	1806
59	Mendelssohn, Felix	The Hebrides' Overture, Op. 26 (Fingal's Cave)	Overture	1830
60	Rachmaninoff, Sergei	Vespers, Op. 37 (All-Night Vigil)	Choral	1915
61	Mendelssohn, Felix	Violin Concerto in E minor, Op. 64 (includes II. Andante)	Concerto for violin	1845
62	Bach, JS/Hess, Myra	Jesu, Joy of Man's Desiring	Cantata	1926
63	Beethoven, Ludwig van	Für Elise	Piano	1810
64	Beethoven, Ludwig van	Symphony No. 9 in D minor, Op. 125 Choral (includes III. Adagio molto e cantabile)	Symphony, choral	1824
65	Ravel, Maurice	Pavane for a Dead Princess	Piano	1899
66	Mendelssohn, Felix	A Midsummer Night's Dream	Orchestral	1826, 1842
67	Beethoven, Ludwig van	Symphony No. 7 in A major (includes II. Allegretto)	Symphony	1811–12
68	Bach, Johann Sebastian	Cantata, BWV 147 Herz und Mund und Tat und Leben (includes "Jesu Joy of Man's Desiring")	Cantata	1716, 1723
69	Gluck, Christoph Willibald	Orpheus and Euridice (includes "Dance of the Blessed Spirits")	Opera	1762
70	Morricone, Ennio	Cinema Paradiso (includes Main Theme; Love Theme for Nata)	Film soundtrack	1988
71	Bach, Johann Sebastian	Goldberg Variations, BWV 988 (includes Aria)	Keyboard	1741
72	Schubert, Franz	Impromptu in G♭ major	Piano	1827
73	Bach, Johann Sebastian	Mass in B minor, BWV 232	Choral, mass	1749
74	Lloyd Webber, Andrew	Requiem (includes "Pie Jesu")	Choral, mass	1984–85
75	Fauré, Gabriel	Cantique de Jean Racine	Choral, with piano	1864–65
76	Handel, George Frideric	Rinaldo (includes "Lascia ch'io pianga")	Opera	1711
77	Mozart, Wolfgang Amadeus	Piano Concerto No. 23 in A major (includes II. Adagio)	Concerto for piano	1786
78	Mozart, Wolfgang Amadeus	Clarinet Quintet, K581 (includes II. Larghetto)	Chamber	1789
79	Brahms, Johannes	A German Requiem, Op. 45	Choral, mass	1868
80	Górecki, Henryk	Symphony No. 3, Op. 36 (Symphony of Sorrowful Songs)	Symphony, with voice	1976
81	Bach, Johann Sebastian	Brandenburg Concerto No. 5, BWV 1050	Concerto, chamber	1721
82	Saint-Saëns, Camille	Samson and Delilah (includes "Mon cœur s'ouvre à ta voix")	Opera	1877
83	Fauré, Gabriel	Pavane, Op. 50	Orchestral, with chorus	1887
84	Gershwin, George	Porgy and Bess (includes "Summertime")	Opera	1934
85	Mozart, Wolfgang Amadeus	Concerto for Flute, Harp, and Orchestra, K. 299	Concerto	1778
86	Korngold, Erich Wolfgang	Die tote Stadt (includes "Glück das mir verblieb")	Opera	1920
87	Satie, Erik	Gnossiennes	Piano	1890s
88	Beethoven, Ludwig van	Symphony No. 6, Op. 68 (Pastoral)	Symphony	1808
89	Chopin, Frédéric	Piano Concerto No. 1 in E minor, Op. 11	Concerto for piano	1830
90	Schubert, Franz	Ave Maria	Choral	1825
91	Sculthorpe, Peter	Little Suite	Suite, for strings	1983
92	Dvořák, Antonín	Cello Concerto in B minor, Op. 104	Concerto for cello	1894–95
93	Pergolesi, Giovanni Battista	Stabat Mater	Oratorio	1736
94	Tavener, John	Song for Athene	Choral	1997
95	Albinoni, Tomaso	Oboe Concerto in D minor, Op. 9, No. 2	Concerto for oboe	1722
96	Bellini, Vincenzo	Norma (includes "Casta diva")	Opera	1831
97	Strauss, Richard	Morgen!	Song	1894
98	Bach, JS/Gounod, Charles	Ave Maria	Choral	1853
99	Bach, Johann Sebastian	Orchestral Suite No. 3 in D major, BWV 1068 (includes Air on a G string)	Suite	1730
100	Puccini, Giacomo	"O mio babbino caro" from Gianni Schicchi	Opera, aria	1917–18

== By composer ==
The following composers were featured in the countdown:

Composer	Nationality	Works
Albinoni	Italian	2
Allegri	Italian	1
JS Bach	German	9
Barber	American	1
Beethoven	German	7
Bellini	Italian	1
Bizet	French	1
Brahms	German	1
Bruch	German	1
Canteloube	French	1
Chopin	Polish-French	1
Debussy	French	2
Delibes	French	1
Dvořák	Czech	3
Edwards	Australian	1
Elgar	English	2
Fauré	French	3
Gershwin	American	1
Gluck	German	1
Gorecki	Polish	1
Gounod	French	1
Grieg	Norwegian	1
Handel	German-British	3
Hess	British	1
Holst	English	1
Jenkins	Welsh	1
Kats-Chernin	Australian	1
Khachaturian	Armenian	1
Korngold	Czech	1
Lloyd Webber	English	1
Mahler	Austrian	1
Mascagni	Italian	1
Massenet	French	1
Mendelssohn	German	3
Morricone	Italian	2
Mozart	Austrian	8
Pachelbel	German	1
Pergolesi	Italian	1
Puccini	Italian	2
Purcell	English	1
Pärt	Estonian	2
Rachmaninoff	Russian	3
Ravel	French	1
Rodrigo	Spanish	1
Saint-Saëns	French	2
Satie	French	2
Schubert	Austrian	2
Sculthorpe	Australian	2
Shostakovich	Russian	1
Strauss	German	2
Tallis	English	1
Tavener	British	1
Tchaikovsky	Russian	1
Vaughan Williams	English	2
Verdi	Italian	1
Wagner	German	1
Westlake	Australian	1
Williams	American	1

Note: Bach had 10 entries on the countdown, including Jesu, Joy of Man's Desiring as part of Herz und Mund und Tat und Leben and as a separate entry.

== See also ==
- Classic 100 Countdowns
- List of classical music composers by era
