= Classic 100 Countdowns =

Series of Australian classical music polls

Since 2001, ABC Classic has organised a number of Classic 100 Countdown surveys. The results of each survey are decided by votes cast by the listeners of ABC Classic. After the voting, the works are played in reverse order of popularity over an intense period of programming. A feature of the countdown is that the top 100 pieces are kept secret until announced.

The top five in each of the countdowns are as follows:

Year	Countdown	Top 5
2001	Classic 100 Original	1. Mozart: Clarinet Concerto in A, K. 622; 2. Vaughan Williams: The Lark Ascending; 3. Beethoven: Symphony No. 9 in D minor, Op. 125 Choral; 4. Beethoven: Piano Concerto No. 5 in E♭, Op. 73 Emperor; 5. Beethoven: Violin Concerto in D major, Op. 61
2004	Classic 100 Piano	1. Beethoven: Piano Sonata No. 14 in C♯ minor, Op. 27/2 Moonlight; 2. Bach, J.S.: Goldberg Variations; 3. Debussy: "Clair de lune" from Suite bergamasque 4. Satie: Gymnopédie No. 1; 5. Beethoven: Piano Sonata No. 8 in C minor, Op. 13 Pathétique
2005/6	Classic 100 Opera	1. Bizet: "Au fond du temple saint" from The Pearl Fishers; 2. Verdi: "Va, pensiero" (Chorus of the Hebrew Slaves) from Nabucco; 3. Delibes: "Sous le dôme épais" (Flower Duet) from Lakmé; 4. Mozart: "Soave sia il vento" (Act 1 trio) from Così fan tutte, K. 588; 5. Purcell: "Thy hand, Belinda ... When I am laid in earth" (Dido's Lament) from Dido and Aeneas
2006	Classic 100 Mozart	1. Clarinet Concerto in A, K. 622 – Adagio; 2. Ave verum corpus, K. 618; 3. Piano Concerto No. 21 in C, K. 467 – Andante; 4. "Soave sia il vento" (Act 1 trio) from Così fan tutte, K. 588; 5. Requiem, K. 626 Lacrimosa
2007	Classic 100 Concerto	1. Beethoven: Piano Concerto No. 5 in E♭, Op. 73 Emperor; 2. Rachmaninoff: Piano Concerto No. 2 in C minor, Op. 18; 3. Beethoven: Violin Concerto in D, Op. 61; 4. Bruch: Violin Concerto No. 1 in G minor, Op. 26; 5. Elgar: Cello Concerto in E minor, Op. 85
2008	Classic 100 Chamber music	1. Schubert: Piano Quintet in A major, D667 Trout; 2. Schubert: String Quintet in C major, D956; 3. Schubert: Nocturne in E♭ major for piano trio, D897; 4. Beethoven: Piano Trio in B♭ major, Op. 97 Archduke; 5. Schubert: String Quartet in D minor, D810 Death and the Maiden
2009	Classic 100 Symphony	1. Dvořák: Symphony No. 9 New World; 2. Beethoven: Symphony No. 9 Choral; 3. Beethoven: Symphony No. 6 Pastoral; 4. Saint-Saëns: Symphony No. 3 Organ; 5. Beethoven: Symphony No. 7
2010	Classic 100 Ten Years On	1. Beethoven: Symphony No. 9; 2. Beethoven: Piano Concerto No. 5 Emperor Concerto; 3. Beethoven: Symphony No. 6 Pastoral; 4. Mozart: Clarinet Concerto; 5. Handel: Messiah, HWV 56
2011	Classic 100 Twentieth Century	1. Elgar: Cello Concerto in E minor 2. Holst: The Planets; 3. Gershwin: Rhapsody in Blue; 4. Vaughan Williams: The Lark Ascending; 5. Rachmaninoff: Piano Concerto No. 2 in C minor, Op. 18
2012	Classic 100 Music of France	1. Bizet: Carmen; 2. Saint-Saëns: Symphony No. 3; 3. Fauré: Requiem; 4. Satie: Gymnopédies; 5. Bizet: "Au fond du temple saint"
2013	Classic 100 Music in the Movies	1. Morricone: The Mission; 2. Williams: Star Wars; 3. Shore: The Lord of the Rings; 4. Vangelis: Chariots of Fire; 5. Jarre: Doctor Zhivago
2014	Classic 100 Baroque and Before	1. Handel: Messiah, HWV 56; 2. Vivaldi: The Four Seasons, Op. 8; 3. Allegri: Miserere; 4. Handel: Water Music; 5. Bach, J.S.: St Matthew Passion, BWV 244
2015	Classic 100 Swoon	1. Vaughan Williams: The Lark Ascending; 2. Mozart: Clarinet Concerto; 3. Barber: Adagio for Strings; 4. Pärt: Spiegel im Spiegel; 5. Allegri: Miserere
2016	Classic 100 Voice	1. Beethoven: Symphony No. 9; 2. Bizet: The Pearlfishers (Duet: "Au fond du temple saint)" 3. Handel: Messiah ("Hallelujah"); 4. Faure: Requiem, Op. 48; 5. Allegri: Miserere
2017	Classic 100 Love	1. Bizet: "Au fond du temple saint" from The Pearl Fishers; 2. Purcell: "When I am laid in earth" from Dido and Aeneas; 3. Wagner: "Liebestod" from Tristan und Isolde; 4. Dvorák: "Song to the Moon" from Rusalka; 5. Puccini: "Un bel dì" from Madama Butterfly
2018	Classic 100 Dance	1. Tchaikovsky: Swan Lake; 2. Tchaikovsky: The Nutcracker; 3. Prokofiev: Romeo and Juliet; 4. Bernstein: West Side Story; 5. Bizet: Carmen
2019	Classic 100 Composer	1. Ludwig van Beethoven; 2. Johann Sebastian Bach; 3. Wolfgang Amadeus Mozart; 4. Pyotr Ilyich Tchaikovsky; 5. George Frideric Handel
2020	Classic 100 Beethoven	1. Symphony No. 9 Choral; 2. Piano Concerto No. 5 Emperor; 3. Symphony No. 6 Pastoral; 4. Symphony No. 7; 5. Symphony No. 5
2021	Classic 100: The Music You Can't Live Without	1. Beethoven: Piano Concerto No. 5; 2. Beethoven: Symphony No. 9; 3. Vaughan Williams: The Lark Ascending; 4. Vivaldi: The Four Seasons; 5. Elgar: Enigma Variations
2022	Classic 100: Music for the screen	1. John Williams: Star Wars series 2. Howard Shore: The Lord of the Rings trilogy 3. Ennio Morricone: The Mission; 4. John Williams, Patrick Doyle, Nicholas Hooper, Alexandre Desplat: Harry Potter series 5. John Williams: Schindler's List
2023	Classic 100: Your Favourite Instrument	1. Cello; 2. Piano; 3. Violin; 4. Oboe; 5. Clarinet
2024	Classic 100: Feel Good	1. Ludwig van Beethoven: Symphony No. 9 "Choral"; 2. Gustav Holst: The Planets; 3. Georges Bizet: The Pearl Fishers; 4. Ludwig van Beethoven: Piano Concerto No. 5 "Emperor"; 5. George Gershwin: Rhapsody in Blue
2025	Classic 100: Piano	1. Ludwig van Beethoven: Piano Concerto No. 5 "Emperor"; 2. Ludwig van Beethoven: Piano Sonata No. 14 "Moonlight"; 3. Frédéric Chopin: Nocturne in E♭ major, Op. 9: No. 2; 4. George Gershwin: Rhapsody in Blue; 5. Claude Debussy: Suite bergamasque, 3rd movement, Clair de lune
2026	Classic 100: Greatest Of All Time	1. Ludwig van Beethoven: Symphony No. 9 in D minor, Op. 125 "Choral"; 2. Ludwig van Beethoven: Piano Concerto No. 5 in E♭ major, Op. 73 "Emperor"; 3. Gustav Holst: The Planets, Op.32; 4. Ralph Vaughan Williams: The Lark Ascending; 5. George Frideric Handel: Messiah, HWV 56

== See also ==
- Classic FM Hall of Fame, a similar list in the UK
