= Sally Whitwell =

- Born: 1974 (age 51–52); Canberra, Australian Capital Territory, Australia
- Genre: Classical
- Occupations: Musician, composer, conductor, arranger, teacher
- Instruments: Piano, accordion, toy piano, melodica, harpsichord
- Years active: 1992–present
- Labels: ABC Classics, Universal
- Website: sillywhatwell.weebly.com

Sally Whitwell (born 1974) is an Australian classical music pianist, composer, arranger, conductor and teacher. She has released five solo albums all on the ABC Classics record label. The first three albums peaked in the top 5 on the ARIA Charts' Classical Albums.

At the ARIA Music Awards of 2011 Whitwell won the Best Classical Album award for Mad Rush: Piano Music of Philip Glass. In 2012 she was nominated in the same category for The Good, the Bad and the Awkward. She won the same category in 2013 for All Imperfect Things: Solo Piano Music of Michael Nyman. Virginia Read won Engineer of the Year for that album and was also nominated for Producer of the Year.

== Biography ==
Whitwell was born in 1974 and grew up in Canberra. She learned to play the piano on her grandmother's "imposing beast of an instrument", including "Cockles and Mussels" and "Wedding of the Painted Doll". In the 1980s she had piano lessons where "a classical tuition is what you would receive". She also studied bassoon but from the age of 16, she concentrated on the piano.

Whitwell attended Canberra Girls' Grammar School, then the Australian National University's School of Music and completed a Bachelor of Music with Honours in 1997. She completed further studies at Sydney Conservatorium of Music for a graduate diploma in accompaniment. During her time at university she also worked part-time, both as a solo performer on the cabaret circuit and as part of ensembles.

During the 2000s Whitwell provided session work for the Australian Broadcasting Corporation (ABC), whenever they wanted "something slightly left-field, or crossover, or contemporary". By 2004 Whitwell provided piano for The Elizabethan Sydney Orchestra and their performance was included on an album for ABC Classics, Felix and Me: Musical Highlights from ABC Classic FM Breakfast. In the following year she was one of the contributors to The Classic 100 Piano, a set of eight CDs, with piano-based tracks selected by listeners to ABC Classic FM. Whitwell arranged some tracks and provided accompaniment of Teddy Tahu Rhodes' and David Hobson's 2009 album You'll Never Walk Alone.

In 2009 she contributed Spiegel im Spiegel, with Sally Maer on cello, for the soundtrack to ABC-TV documentary special, Bombora – The Story of Australian Surfing, which describes a history of the sport and the 1963 instrumental single "Bombora", by The Atlantics. In 2010 Whitwell released "Roadtrip", a self-composed score for flute and piano. She was inspired by "the train commute I make weekly from Sydney to a university teaching job in Newcastle".

For three days in November 2010, Whitwell worked at the ABC's studios to record her debut solo album, Mad Rush: Piano Music of Philip Glass, which was issued on 3 June 2011 by ABC Classics. For the album she utilised a 102-note piano crafted by Australian company, Stuart & Sons. Melissa Lesnie of Limelight noted in August that the album of works written by minimalist composer, Philip Glass, had become a "surprise hit, not least thanks to Glass's broad appeal across genre and age divides". Whitwell told Lesnie that the Stuart & Sons piano "allows so many colours, such subtle gradations of dynamics, that you can't get on another instrument in my experience. A Stuart sound is like crystal, yet it's very flexible".

At the ARIA Music Awards of 2011 Whitwell won the Best Classical Album award for her debut album. In December The Australian's Mark Coughlan described her interpretation as "excellent throughout this disc, going beyond mere notational accuracy to breathe life and shape into the music". Stephen Eddins writing for AllMusic declared "[her] disregard for conventionality bubbles through just about every aspect of her recording ... surprising rhythmic emphases may make anyone familiar with the piece sit up and do a double-take, and her tempo is about 25% faster than Glass' version ... [s]he brings acute intelligence and sensitive musicality to each of the pieces, most of which have a delicately melancholy tone".

On her second album, The Good, the Bad and the Awkward (18 May 2012), Whitwell played piano, toy piano, harpsichord, recorder, and melodica. Its theme was cinema-based music from various feature films including The Hunger (1983), The Portrait of a Lady (1996), Amélie (2001), The Hours (2002), and Twilight (2008). The Canberra Times' Ron Cerabona summarised her selection "[s]ome are pieces of classical music; others are from original film scores and she associates each of them with a particular character". At the ARIA Music Awards of 2012 she was nominated for The Good, the Bad and the Awkward as Best Classical Album.

Whitwell has worked with Nadia Piave on vocals (soprano) as the duo une fois seule! and they performed on the Musica Viva series of concerts. In February 2013 Glass performed the world premiere of his Complete Piano Etudes at the Perth Concert Hall. Whitwell joined Glass and Japanese pianist, Maki Namekawa, on stage to present the 20 etudes. Whitwell played seven of the etudes and according to Elizabeth Howard at theMusic.com.au "[she] surprised classical dilettantes with her serene style and humble manner. Her interpretation exhibited a softness that suggested an introspective exploration of Glass's compositions." Coughlan described her style "[p]erforming from memory, she brought a fluid, organic approach to the musical structures, crafting the repetitive note patterns into elegant phrases that subverted the music's mechanical drive. With excellent control of tone colour, she played with warmth, brilliance and delicacy".

On 6 September 2013 Whitwell issued her third solo album, All Imperfect Things: The Piano Music of Michael Nyman, which was engineered and produced by Virginia Read. At the ARIA Music Awards of 2013 she won another Best Classical Music category; Read won Engineer of the Year and was also nominated for Producer of the Year. Whitwells' composition "Spirit of the Plains" appeared on the 2013 eponymously titled album that covered Australian flute music from 1997 to 2013. Whitwell collaborated again with Teddy Tahu Rhodes for his 2015 album There Was a Man Lived in the Moon.

Whitwell was involved closely with Gondwana Choirs as an accompanist for about twenty years until 2023, when she moved back from Sydney to Canberra.

Whitwell was voted no. 96 in a poll of Australia's favourite composers by ABC Classic in 2019. In 2017, her piece She Walks in Beauty was voted at no. 27 in the station's annual Classic 100 Countdown. Road Trip was voted at no. 99 in the 2025 countdown.

=== Personal life ===
As of October 2008 Sally Whitwell lived with her domestic and business partner, United Kingdom-born Glennda Blyth, a visual artist. They ran a multi-art space in Sydney, The Sal-On, for lesbian artists. In August 2011 Whitwell described Blyth as her "[g]irlfriend, or if you want to get technical about it, 'Fiancée'" and indicated they were due to seek a civil union. Whitwell described her tattoos, which "have very personal meanings for me, but I also love them purely for aesthetic reasons".

== Discography ==
=== Albums ===
List of studio albums, with selected chart positions
Title	Album details	Peak chart positions		
Title	Album details	AUS Classical	AUS Heatseekers	AUS Australian Artists
Mad Rush	Released: 3 June 2011; Label: ABC Classics; Formats: CD	2	3	17
The Good, the Bad and the Awkward	Released: 18 May 2012; Label: ABC Classics; Formats: CD	3	15	—
All Imperfect Things: Solo Piano Music of Michael Nyman	Released: 6 September 2013; Label: ABC Classics; Formats: CD	5	19	—
I Was Flying	Released: 2014; Label: ABC Classics; Formats: CD			
Philip Glass - Complete Etudes For Solo Piano	Released: 2018; Label: ABC Classics; Formats: 2×CD			

== Awards and nominations ==
=== ARIA Music Awards ===
The ARIA Music Awards is an annual awards ceremony that recognises excellence, innovation, and achievement across all genres of Australian music. They commenced in 1987.

Year	Nominee / work	Award	Result	Ref.
2011	Mad Rush: Piano Music of Philip Glass	Best Classical Album	Won	
2012	The Good, the Bad and the Awkward	Best Classical Album	Nominated	
2013	All Imperfect Things: Solo Piano Music of Michael Nyman	Best Classical Album	Won	
2013	Virginia Read for All Imperfect Things: Solo Piano Music of Michael Nyman	Engineer of the Year	Won	
2015	I Was Flying	Best Classical Album	Nominated	
2018	Philip Glass: Complete Etudes for Solo Piano	Best Classical Album	Nominated	
