= Classic 100 Voice =

In 2016, the Australian radio station ABC Classic FM held the fourteenth of its annual Classic Music countdowns, during which the public voted for 100 favourite pieces. The chosen theme was "Voice" and included opera, operetta, choral music and classical song. The Classic 100 Voice countdown was broadcast in reverse order from 10 to 13 June.

== Countdown results ==
The results of the countdown are as follows:

Rank	Composer	Work	Date
100	Beethoven, Ludwig van	Choral Fantasy	1808
99	Handel, George Frederic	Giulio Cesare ("Piangerò la sorte mia")	1724
98	Bach, Johann Sebastian	Wachet auf, ruft uns die Stimme, BWV 140	1731
97	Strauss, Richard	"Morgen!"	1894
96	Beethoven, Ludwig van	Fidelio	1805
95	Humperdinck, Engelbert	Hansel und Gretel ("When I Lay Me Down to Sleep")	1892
94	Schubert, Franz	Die schöne Müllerin	1823
93	Mascagni, Pietro	Cavalleria rusticana	1889
92	Mozart, Wolfgang Amadeus	Zaide ("Ruhe sanft")	1780
91	Rossini, Gioachino	The Barber of Seville ("Largo al factotum")	1813
90	Schubert, Franz	Ellens Gesang III (Ave Maria)	1825
89	Anonymous	Greensleeves	
88	Parry, Hubert	I Was Glad	1902
87	Britten, Benjamin	War Requiem	1962
86	Villa-Lobos, Heitor	Bachianas Brasileiras No. 5	1938
85	Lehár, Franz	The Merry Widow ("Es lebt' eine Vilja, ein Waldmägdelein" (Vilia Song))	1905
84	Wagner, Richard	Die Walküre (The Valkyrie)	1856
83	Rutter, John	The Lord Bless You and Keep You	1981
82	Bach, Johann Sebastian	Magnificat in D, BWV243	1733
81	Mendelssohn, Felix	Elijah ("Lift Thine Eyes")	1846
80	Handel, George Frederic	Samson ("Let the Bright Seraphim")	1741
79	Mendelssohn, Felix	A Midsummer Night's Dream	1842
78	Bach, Johann Sebastian	Christmas Oratorio	1734
77	Lauridsen, Morten	O magnum mysterium	1994
76	Haydn, Franz Joseph	The Creation	1798
75	Schubert, Franz	An die Musik	1817
74	Donizetti, Gaetano	Lucia di Lammermoor (Mad Scene)	1835
73	Beethoven, Ludwig van	Missa Solemnis	1823
72	Bach, Johann Sebastian	St John Passion	1724
71	Verdi, Giuseppe	Rigoletto	1851
70	Westlake, Nigel	Missa Solis: Requiem for Eli	2011
69	Rachmaninov, Sergei	Vocalise	1915
68	Tavener, John	Song for Athene	1993
67	Rutter, John	For the Beauty of the Earth	1980
66	Britten, Benjamin	A Ceremony of Carols	1942
65	Sullivan, Arthur	The Mikado	1885
64	Korngold, Erich Wolfgang	Die tote Stadt ("Glück, das mir verblieb")	1920
63	Strauss, Richard	Der Rosenkavalier	1911
62	Mozart, Wolfgang Amadeus	Don Giovanni (Catalogue Aria: "Madamina, il catalogo è questo")	1787
61	Schubert, Franz	Erlkönig	1815
60	Mahler, Gustav	Das Lied von der Erde (The Song of the Earth)	1909
59	Sullivan, Arthur	The Pirates of Penzance	1879
58	Handel, George Frederic	Rinaldo ("Lascia ch'io pianga")	1711
57	Saint-Saens, Camille	Samson et Dalila ("Mon cœur s'ouvre à ta voix")	1877
56	Mahler, Gustav	Symphony No. 2 Resurrection (Urlicht)	1895
55	Bach, Johann Sebastian	Sheep May Safely Graze, Cantata BWV 208	1713
54	Franck, César	Panis angelicus	1872
53	Bellini, Vincenzo	Norma ("Casta diva")	1831
52	Edwards, Ross	Dawn Mantras	1999
51	Fauré, Gabriel	Cantique de Jean Racine, Op. 11	1865
50	Verdi, Giuseppe	Aida	1871
49	Gluck, Christoph Willibald von	Orfeo ed Euridice	1762
48	Hildegard von Bingen	O Ecclesia	
47	Barber, Samuel	Agnus Dei	1967
46	Handel, George Frederic	Serse (Xerxes) ("Ombra mai fu")	1738
45	Verdi, Giuseppe	Requiem	1874
44	Wagner, Richard	Tristan und Isolde ("Liebestod")	1859
43	Rachmaninov, Sergei	Vespers (All Night Vigil)	1915
42	Monteverdi, Claudio	Vespers of 1610	1610
41	Pergolesi, Giovanni Battista	Stabat Mater	1736
40	Verdi, Giuseppe	La traviata	1853
39	Puccini, Giacomo	Tosca ("Vissi d'arte")	1900
38	Jenkins, Karl	The Armed Man: A Mass for Peace	1999
37	Brahms, Johannes	A German Requiem	1868
36	Puccini, Giacomo	Gianni Schicchi ("O mio babbino caro")	1918
35	Schubert, Franz	Winterreise	1828
34	Górecki, Henryk	Symphony No. 3 Symphony of Sorrowful Songs	1976
33	Lloyd Webber, Andrew	Requiem – Pie Jesu	1985
32	Mozart, Wolfgang Amadeus	Exsultate, jubilate – Alleluia	1773
31	Elgar, Edward	Sea Pictures	1899
30	Bach, Johann Sebastian	Mass in B minor	1749
29	Tallis, Thomas	Spem in alium	c.1570
28	Kats-Chernin, Elena	Wild Swans (Eliza's Aria)	2002
27	Bach, Johann Sebastian	Cantata BWV 147 ("Jesu, Joy of Man's Desiring")	1723
26	Mozart, Wolfgang Amadeus	The Marriage of Figaro ("Voi che sapete")	1786
25	Parry, Hubert	Jerusalem	1916
24	Verdi, Giuseppe	Nabucco ("Va, pensiero")	1842
23	Gershwin, George	Porgy and Bess ("Summertime")	1934
22	Mozart, Wolfgang Amadeus	The Magic Flute	1791
21	Mozart, Wolfgang Amadeus	Così fan tutte ("Soave sia il vento")	1790
20	Vivaldi, Antonio	Gloria, RV 589	1715
19	Bizet, Georges	Carmen	1875
18	Puccini, Giacomo	La bohème ("Che gelida manina")	1896
17	Canteloube, Joseph	Songs of the Auvergne	1930
16	Puccini, Giacomo	Turandot ("Nessun dorma")	1924
15	Purcell, Henry	Dido and Aeneas ("When I Am Laid in Earth")	c.1684
14	Dvorák, Antonín	Rusalka ("Song to the Moon")	1900
13	Mozart, Wolfgang Amadeus	Ave verum corpus, K. 618	1791
12	Handel, George Frederic	Coronation Anthems (Zadok the Priest)	1727
11	Bach, Johann Sebastian	St Matthew Passion	1727
10	Puccini, Giacomo	Madama Butterfly ("Un bel dì")	1904
09	Orff, Carl	Carmina Burana	1936
08	Strauss, Richard	Four Last Songs	1948
07	Delibes, Léo	Lakmé ("Flower Duet: Sous le dôme épais")	1883
06	Mozart, Wolfgang Amadeus	Requiem, K. 626	1791
05	Allegri, Gregorio	Miserere	c.1630s
04	Fauré, Gabriel	Requiem, Op. 48	1890
03	Handel, George Frederic	Messiah ("Hallelujah")	1741
02	Bizet, Georges	Les pêcheurs de perles (Duet: "Au fond du temple saint")	1863
01	Beethoven, Ludwig van	Symphony No. 9	1824

== See also ==
- Classic 100 Countdowns
