= Classic 100 Opera (ABC) =

The following is a summary of the Classic 100 Opera survey conducted by the ABC Classic FM radio station during 2005/6.

== Survey summary ==
Rank	Composer	Opera	Aria
100	Balfe	The Bohemian Girl	"I Dreamt I Dwelt in Marble Halls"
99	Wagner	Parsifal	Prelude
98	Mozart	The Magic Flute	"Der Vogelfänger bin ich ja" (Birdcatcher's Aria)
97	Mozart	The Abduction from the Seraglio	"O, wie will ich triumphieren" (Osmin's Aria)
96	J. Strauss II/Benatzky	Casanova	"O Madonna, auf uns sieh" (Nuns' Chorus)
95	Verdi	The Force of Destiny	"La Vergine degli angeli" (act 2: Hymn)
94	Verdi	Otello	"Piangea cantando" (Willow Song)
93	Mozart	The Marriage of Figaro	"Esci, omai, garzon malnato" (act 2 finale)
92	Mozart	The Magic Flute	"Dies Bildnis ist bezaubernd schön"
91	Verdi	La traviata	"Parigi, o cara" (Final duet)
90	Rossini	The Barber of Seville	"Largo al factotum"
89	Puccini	Madama Butterfly	"Ancora un passo ... Spira sul mare" (act 1: Entrance of Butterfly)
88	Mozart	Don Giovanni	"Deh vieni alla finestra" (Serenade)
87	Godard	Jocelyn	"Berceuse"
86	Mozart	The Marriage of Figaro	"Sull'aria" (Letter Duet)
85	Berlioz	The Trojans	"Nuit d'ivresse" (act 4 love duet)
84	Mozart	The Marriage of Figaro	Overture
83	Gluck	Orphée et Eurydice	Dance of the Blessed Spirits
82	Bellini	I puritani	"A te, o cara"
81	Mozart	Don Giovanni	"Madamina, il catalogo è questo" (Catalogue Aria)
80	R. Strauss	Salome	"Ich habe deinen Mund geküsst, Jokanaan" (final scene)
79	Mozart	The Magic Flute	"O zittre nicht, mein lieber Sohn"
78	Handel	Julius Caesar	"Va tacito e nascosto"
77	Verdi	Otello	"Già nella notte densa" (Love duet)
76	Verdi	La traviata	Prelude
75	Bizet	Carmen	"Votre toast, je peux vous le rendre" (Toreador's Song)
74	Tchaikovsky	Eugene Onegin	"Kuda vy udalilis" (Lensky's aria)
73	Verdi	Aida	"O terra, addio" (act 4 final duet)
72	Wagner	Götterdämmerung	Immolation of Brünnhilde
71	Delibes	Lakmé	"Où va la jeune Indoue" (Bell Song)
70	Giordano	Andrea Chénier	"La mamma morta"
69	Lehár	The Merry Widow	"Es lebt' eine Vilja, ein Waldmägdelein" (Vilia Song)
68	Verdi	La traviata	"Madamigella Valéry... Pura siccome un angelo ...Dite alla giovine" (act 2, scene 5)
67	Wagner	Götterdämmerung	Siegfried's Funeral Music (act 3)
66	Puccini	La bohème	"Quando me'n vo'" (Musetta's Waltz)
65	Bizet	Carmen	"La fleur que tu m'avais jetée" (Flower Song)
64	Wagner	Die Walküre	"Ho jo to ho" (The Ride of the Valkyries)
63	Donizetti	The Daughter of the Regiment	"Ah! Mes amis...Pour mon âme"
62	Gershwin	Porgy and Bess	"Summertime"
61	Mozart	The Magic Flute	"O Isis und Osiris"
60	Wagner	The Mastersingers of Nuremberg	"Morgenlich leuchtend in rosigem Schein" (Walther's Prize Song)
59	Beethoven	Fidelio	"O welche Lust" (Prisoners' chorus)
58	Offenbach	The Tales of Hoffmann	"Belle nuit, ô nuit d'amour" (Barcarolle)
57	Mozart	The Marriage of Figaro	"Porgi amor"
56	Donizetti	The Elixir of Love	"Una furtiva lagrima"
55	Tchaikovsky	Eugene Onegin	"Puskai pogibnu ya, no pryezhde" (Letter Scene)
54	Puccini	La bohème	"Sono andati?" (Death of Mimì)
53	Mozart	Zaide	"Ruhe sanft"
52	Massenet	Thaïs	Méditation
51	Monteverdi	The Coronation of Poppea	"Pur ti miro"
50	Mozart	The Marriage of Figaro	"Voi che sapete"
49	Puccini	Madama Butterfly	"Tu, tu piccolo Iddio" (Death of Butterfly)
48	Verdi	La traviata	"Libiamo ne' lieti calici" (Brindisi)
47	Handel	Serse	"Ombra mai fu"
46	Bizet	The Pearl Fishers	"Je crois entendre encore" (act 1 romance)
45	Korngold	Die tote Stadt	"Glück, das mir verblieb" (Marietta's Song)
44	Bellini	Beatrice di Tenda	"Angel of Peace"
43	Humperdinck	Hansel and Gretel	"When Night Comes Softly Creeping... Now I Lay Me Down to Sleep" (Evening Prayer)
42	Wagner	Tannhäuser	"Der Gnade Heil" (Pilgrims' Chorus)
41	Leoncavallo	Pagliacci	"Vesti la giubba" (On with the Play)
40	Wagner	Die Walküre	"Leb wohl" (Wotan's Farewell)
39	Mozart	The Magic Flute	"Pa-pa-pa Papagena"
38	Handel	Rinaldo	"Lascia ch'io pianga"
37	Mascagni	Cavalleria rusticana	Easter Hymn
36	Mozart	Don Giovanni	"Là ci darem la mano"
35	Strauss	Der Rosenkavalier	"Mir ist die Ehre widerfahren" (Presentation of the Rose)
34	Mozart	The Marriage of Figaro	"Dove sono I bei momenti" (act 3)
33	Puccini	Tosca	"Tre sbirri, una carrozza...Te Deum" (act 1 finale)
32	Puccini	Tosca	"Vissi d'arte"
31	Donizetti	Lucia di Lammermoor	"Chi mi frena" (act 2 sextet)
30	Catalani	La Wally	"Ebben? Ne andró lontana"
29	Mozart	The Marriage of Figaro	"Pace, pace...Gente, gente, all'armi" (act 4 finale)
28	Verdi	Aida	"Gloria all Egitto" (Triumphal March)
27	Saint-Saëns	Samson and Delilah	"Mon cœur s'ouvre à ta voix" (act 2: Delilah's aria)
26	Mozart	Don Giovanni	"Don Giovanni, a cenar teco" (act 2: The statue comes to dinner)
25	Bizet	Carmen	"L'amour est un oiseau rebelle" (Habanera)
24	Beethoven	Fidelio	"Mir ist so wunderbar" (act 1 quartet)
23	Mascagni	Cavalleria rusticana	Intermezzo
22	Puccini	Tosca	"E lucevan le stelle"
21	Gounod	Faust	"Alerte! Alerte!...Anges purs"
20	Puccini	Gianni Schicchi	"O mio babbino caro"
19	Puccini	Madama Butterfly	The Humming Chorus
18	Mozart	The Magic Flute	"Der Hölle Rache" (Queen of the Night aria)
17	Donizetti	Lucia di Lammermoor	"Il dolce suono" (Mad Scene, act 3)
16	Puccini	Madama Butterfly	"Vogliatemi bene" (act 1, love duet)
15	Puccini	La bohème	"Che gelida manina"
14	Puccini	La bohème	"O soave fanciulla"
13	Bellini	Norma	"Casta diva"
12	Puccini	Turandot	"Nessun dorma"
11	Dvořák	Rusalka	"Song to the Moon"
10	R. Strauss	Der Rosenkavalier	"Hab' mir's gelobt" (act 3 trio and finale)
9	Gluck	Orfeo ed Euridice	"Che faro senza Euridice"
8	Verdi	Rigoletto	"Bella figlia dell'amore" (act 3 quartet)
7	Wagner	Tristan und Isolde	"Liebestod"
6	Puccini	Madama Butterfly	"Un bel dì" (One fine day)
5	Purcell	Dido and Aeneas	"Thy hand, Belinda...When I am laid in earth" (Dido's Lament)
4	Mozart	Così fan tutte	"Soave sia il vento" (act 1 trio)
3	Delibes	Lakmé	"Sous le dôme épais" (Flower Duet)
2	Verdi	Nabucco	"Va, pensiero" (Chorus of the Hebrew slaves)
1	Bizet	The Pearl Fishers	"Au fond du temple saint" (In the depths of the temple)

== See also ==
- Classic 100 Countdowns
