= Classic 100 Twentieth Century =

During 2011 the Australian radio station ABC Classic FM held a Classic 100 Twentieth Century countdown.

Voting for the countdown was held between 1 October 2011 and 23 October 2011, with each listener permitted to vote for up to 10 pieces of music that were "composed since 1900".

The broadcasting of the results of the countdown began on 26 November 2011 and concluded on 3 December 2011 (with the top-ranked works played live by the Adelaide Symphony Orchestra in concert at the Adelaide Festival Theatre).

== Countdown results ==
The results of the countdown were as follows:

Rank	Composer	Work	Genre	Year
100	Adams, John	The Chairman Dances (derived from Nixon in China)	Orchestral	1985
99	Ramírez, Ariel	Misa Criolla	Choral, mass	1964
98	Prokofiev, Sergei	Lieutenant Kijé	Symphonic suite	1933
97	Addinsell, Richard	Warsaw Concerto	Concerto for piano	1941
96	Shostakovich, Dmitri	Symphony No. 10 in E minor	Symphony	1953
95	Tavener, John	Song for Athene	Choral, a cappella (four-part)	1993
94	Sibelius, Jean	Symphony No. 7 in C major	Symphony	1924
93	Elgar, Edward	Violin Concerto in B minor	Concerto for violin	1910
92	Britten, Benjamin	Serenade for Tenor, Horn and Strings	Song cycle	1943
91	Lloyd Webber, Andrew	Requiem (Pie Jesu)	Choral, mass	1985
90	Shore, Howard	The Lord of the Rings	Film soundtrack	2001
89	Lehár, Franz	The Merry Widow	Operetta	1905
88	Elgar, Edward	The Dream of Gerontius	Choral and orchestra	1900
87	O'Boyle, Sean	Concerto for Didgeridoo	Concerto for didgeridoo	2003?
86	Vaughan Williams, Ralph	Sir John in Love, (fantasia on Greensleeves)	Orchestral, fantasia	1929
85	Weill, Kurt	The Threepenny Opera	Musical	1928
84	Villa-Lobos, Heitor	Bachianas Brasileiras No. 5	Orchestral, suite, with voice	1938
83	Ravel, Maurice	Daphnis et Chloé	Ballet score	1912
82	Glass, Philip	Akhnaten	Opera	1983
81	Messiaen, Olivier	Turangalîla-Symphonie	Orchestral, with piano	1948
80	Grainger, Percy	Irish tune from County Derry	Folksong adaptation	1911
79	Barber, Samuel	Violin Concerto	Concerto for violin	1939
78	Elgar, Edward	Symphony No. 1 in A-flat major	Symphony	1908
77	Gershwin, George	Concerto in F	Concerto for piano	1925
76	Bernstein, Leonard	Candide	Operetta	1956
75	Strauss, Richard	An Alpine Symphony	Symphonic poem	1915
74	Korngold, Erich Wolfgang	Violin Concerto in D major	Concerto for violin	1945
73	Mahler, Gustav	Symphony No. 6 in A minor (Tragic)	Symphony	1904
72	Gershwin, George	An American in Paris	Symphonic poem	1928
71	Britten, Benjamin	The Young Person's Guide to the Orchestra	Orchestral, with narrator	1946
70	Britten, Benjamin	A Ceremony of Carols	Choral	1942
69	Rachmaninoff, Sergei	All-Night Vigil	Choral, a cappella	1915
68	Jenkins, Karl	The Armed Man	Choral, mass	1999
67	Debussy, Claude	Preludes, Book 1 (Note: Music broadcast for number 67: The Girl with the Flaxen Hair and The Sunken Cathedral.)	Piano	1910
66	Mahler, Gustav	Symphony No. 9	Symphony	1910
65	Parry, Sir Hubert	Jerusalem	Choral, hymn	1916
64	Respighi, Ottorino	Pines of Rome	Symphonic poem	1924
63	Schoenberg, Arnold	Transfigured Night	String sextet	1899
62	Ravel, Maurice	Piano Concerto in G major	Concerto for piano	1931
61	Mahler, Gustav	Symphony No. 4	Symphony	1901
60	Shostakovich, Dmitri	Symphony No. 7 (Leningrad)	Symphony	1941
59	Britten, Benjamin	War Requiem (Dies irae)	Choral, mass	1962
58	Mahler, Gustav	Symphony No. 8 (Symphony of a Thousand)	Symphony	1906
57	Prokofiev, Sergei	Symphony No. 1 (The Classical)	Symphony	1917
56	Pärt, Arvo	Cantus in Memoriam Benjamin Britten	String orchestra, with bell	1977
55	Canteloube, Joseph	Songs of the Auvergne (Note: Music broadcast for number 55: Baïlèro, Brezairola, Oi ayai, and La delaïssádo.)	Choral, folk songs	1930
54	Ravel, Maurice	Pavane for a Dead Princess	Orchestral	1910
53	Respighi, Ottorino	Ancient Airs and Dances (Note: Music broadcast for number 53: Suite 2.)	Orchestral, suite	1923
52	Puccini, Giacomo	Turandot	Opera	1924
51	Sculthorpe, Peter	Kakadu	Orchestral	1988
50	Britten, Benjamin	Four Sea Interludes (from Peter Grimes)	Orchestral, suite	1945
49	Edwards, Ross	Dawn Mantras	Choral	1999
48	Shostakovich, Dmitri	The Gadfly Suite	Orchestral, suite	1955
47	Stravinsky, Igor	Petrushka	Ballet score	1911
46	Sculthorpe, Peter	Small Town	Ensemble	1976
45	Edwards, Ross	Violin Concerto (Maninyas)	Concerto for Violin	1988
44	Rachmaninoff, Sergei	Symphony No. 2	Symphony	1907
43	Glass, Philip	Violin Concerto No. 1	Concerto for violin	1987
42	Bartók, Béla	Concerto for Orchestra	Concerto for various instruments	1943
41	Messiaen, Olivier	Quartet for the End of Time	Chamber	1941
40	Strauss, Richard	Der Rosenkavalier (The Knight of the Rose)	Opera, comic	1911
39	Kats-Chernin, Elena	Wild Swans	Ballet score	2002
38	Prokofiev, Sergei	Peter and the Wolf	Orchestral, with narrator	1936
37	Ravel, Maurice	String Quartet in F major	Chamber, string quartet	1903
36	Morricone, Ennio	The Mission	Film soundtrack	1986
35	Stravinsky, Igor	The Firebird (suite)	Ballet score	1910
34	Debussy, Claude	La mer (The sea)	Orchestral	1905
33	Mahler, Gustav	Das Lied von der Erde (The Song of the Earth)	Orchestral, with voice	1909
32	Copland, Aaron	Fanfare for the Common Man	Fanfare, brass and percussion	1942
31	Shostakovich, Dmitri	Symphony No. 5 in D minor	Symphony	1937
30	Sibelius, Jean	Symphony No. 5 in E-flat major	Symphony	1915
29	Westlake, Nigel	Antarctica	Film soundtrack, suite	1992
28	Puccini, Giacomo	Tosca	Opera	1899
27	Sibelius, Jean	Symphony No. 2 in D major	Symphony	1902
26	Khachaturian, Aram	Spartacus	Ballet score	1954
25	Mahler, Gustav	Symphony No. 5 in C-sharp minor	Symphony	1902
24	Gershwin, George	Porgy and Bess	Opera	1935
23	Sibelius, Jean	Violin Concerto in D minor	Concerto for violin	1904
22	Rachmaninoff, Sergei	Rhapsody on a Theme of Paganini in A minor	Orchestral, with piano	1934
21	Elgar, Edward	Pomp and Circumstance March (No. 1 in D major)	Orchestral, march	1901
20	Ravel, Maurice	Boléro	Orchestral	1928
19	Rachmaninoff, Sergei	Piano Concerto No. 3 in D minor	Concerto for piano	1909
18	Copland, Aaron	Appalachian Spring	Orchestral, suite	1944
17	Puccini, Giacomo	Madama Butterfly (Note: Music broadcast for number 17: Act 1.)	Opera	1904
16	Pärt, Arvo	Spiegel im Spiegel (Mirror in the mirror)	Tintinnabular (piano and violin)	1978
15	Sibelius, Jean	Finlandia	Symphonic poem, with voice	1900
14	Górecki, Henryk	Symphony No. 3 (Symphony of Sorrowful Songs)	Symphony, with voice	1976
13	Bernstein, Leonard	West Side Story (Note: Music broadcast for number 13: Act 1.)	Musical	1957
12	Vaughan Williams, Ralph	Fantasia on a Theme by Thomas Tallis	String orchestra, fantasia	1910
11	Strauss, Richard	Four Last Songs	Orchestral, with soprano	1948
10	Prokofiev, Sergei	Romeo and Juliet (Note: Music broadcast for number 10: Act 1.)	Ballet score	1935
9	Stravinsky, Igor	The Rite of Spring	Ballet score	1913
8	Orff, Carl	Carmina Burana	Choral, scenic cantata	1936
7	Barber, Samuel	Adagio for Strings	String orchestra	1936
6	Rodrigo, Joaquín	Concierto de Aranjuez	Orchestral, with guitar	1939
5	Rachmaninoff, Sergei	Piano Concerto No. 2	Concerto for piano	1901
4	Vaughan Williams, Ralph	The Lark Ascending	Violin and piano	1914
3	Gershwin, George	Rhapsody in Blue	Orchestral, with piano	1924
2	Holst, Gustav	The Planets (Note: Music broadcast for number 2: Mercury.)	Orchestral, suite	1916
1	Elgar, Edward	Cello Concerto in E minor	Concerto for cello	1919

=== Results ranked by year ===
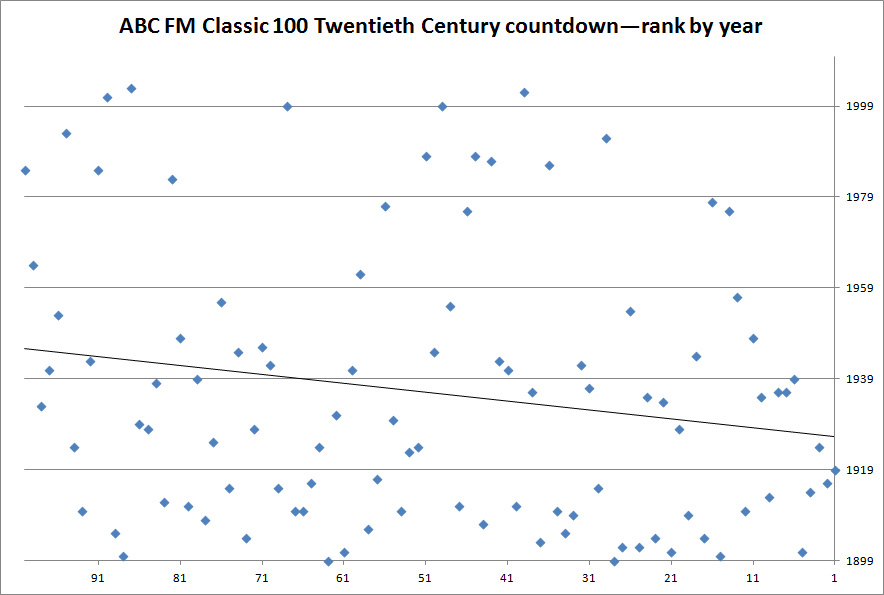
Classic FM Twentieth Century Countdown—ranking by year (with linear trend line)

== Programming ==
For more information about the works broadcast (including performers and recording details), see ABC Classic FM's programming notes:

- Day 1: Numbers 100 to 88
- Day 2: Numbers 87 to 78
- Day 3: Numbers 77 to 66
- Day 4: Numbers 65 to 55
- Day 5: Numbers 54 to 41
- Day 6: Numbers 40 to 29
- Day 7: Numbers 28 to 19
- Day 8: Numbers 18 to 1

== By composer ==
The following 48 composers were featured in the countdown:

Composer	Nationality	Works in countdown
Adams, John	American	1
Addinsell, Richard	British	1
Barber, Samuel	American	2
Bartók, Béla	Hungarian	1
Bernstein, Leonard	American	2
Britten, Benjamin	British	5
Canteloube, Joseph	French	1
Copland, Aaron	American	2
Debussy, Claude	French	2
Edwards, Ross	Australian	2
Elgar, Edward	British	5
Gershwin, George	American	4
Glass, Philip	American	2
Górecki, Henryk	Polish	1
Grainger, Percy	Australian	1
Holst, Gustav	British	1
Jenkins, Karl	British	1
Kats-Chernin, Elena	Australian	1
Khachaturian, Aram	Armenian	1
Korngold, Erich Wolfgang	Austro-Hungarian	1
Lehár, Franz	Austro-Hungarian	1
Lloyd Webber, Andrew	British	1
Mahler, Gustav	Austrian	6
Messiaen, Olivier	French	2
Morricone, Ennio	Italian	1
O'Boyle, Sean	Australian	1
Orff, Carl	German	1
Parry, Sir Hubert	British	1
Pärt, Arvo	Estonian	2
Prokofiev, Sergei	Russian	4
Puccini, Giacomo	Italian	3
Rachmaninoff, Sergei	Russian	5
Ramírez, Ariel	Argentine	1
Ravel, Maurice	French	5
Respighi, Ottorino	Italian	2
Rodrigo, Joaquín	Spanish	1
Schoenberg, Arnold	Austrian	1
Sculthorpe, Peter	Australian	2
Shore, Howard	Canadian	1
Shostakovich, Dmitri	Russian	4
Sibelius, Jean	Finnish	5
Strauss, Richard	German	3
Stravinsky, Igor	Russian	3
Tavener, John	British	1
Vaughan Williams, Ralph	British	3
Villa-Lobos, Heitor	Brazilian	1
Weill, Kurt	German	1
Westlake, Nigel	Australian	1

== See also ==
- Classic 100 Countdowns
