= Classic 100 Music in the Movies =

In 2013, the Australian radio station ABC Classic FM held a Classic 100 Music in the Movies countdown.

The selection of works that was available in the survey was determined between 15 April and 26 April 2013 (with the public being able to add works to the list initiated by the station). Voting (by the public) for the finalised list of works was held between 3 May and 17 May 2013, and the countdown was broadcast from 7 to 10 June 2013.

== Countdown results ==
The results of the countdown are as follows:

Rank	Composer	Film	Work	Year of film release
1	Ennio Morricone	The Mission	Score	1986
2	John Williams	Star Wars	Score	1977
3	Howard Shore	The Lord of the Rings	Score	2001
4	Vangelis	Chariots of Fire	Score	1981
5	Maurice Jarre	Doctor Zhivago	Score	1965
6	Maurice Jarre	Lawrence of Arabia	Score	1962
7	Ludwig van Beethoven	The King's Speech	Piano Concerto No. 5	2010
8	John Barry	Out of Africa	Score	1985
9	Michael Nyman	The Piano	Score	1993
10	John Williams	Schindler's List	Score	1993
11	Tomaso Albinoni	Gallipoli	Adagio in G minor	1981
12	Bruce Smeaton	Picnic at Hanging Rock	Score	1975
13	Richard Strauss	2001: A Space Odyssey	Also sprach Zarathustra	1968
14	Eric Coates	The Dam Busters	Score	1955
15	John Williams	Indiana Jones	Score	1981–2008
16	Ennio Morricone	Cinema Paradiso	Score	1988
17	Wolfgang Amadeus Mozart	Amadeus	Requiem	1984
18	Mikis Theodorakis	Zorba the Greek	Score	1964
19	Scott Joplin	The Sting	Score	1973
20	Anton Karas	The Third Man	Score	1949
21	Ennio Morricone	The Good, the Bad and the Ugly	Score	1966
22	Dmitri Shostakovich	The Gadfly	Score	1956
23	Samuel Barber	Platoon	Adagio for Strings	1986
24	John Williams, William Ross, Patrick Doyle, Nicholas Hooper, Alexandre Desplat	Harry Potter	Score	2001
25	Hans Zimmer, Klaus Badelt	Pirates of the Caribbean	Score	2003
26	Richard Wagner	Apocalypse Now	"Ride of the Valkyries"	1979
27	Mark Knopfler	Local Hero	Score	1983
28	John Barry	Dances with Wolves	Score	1990
29	Ludwig van Beethoven	A Clockwork Orange	Symphony No. 9	1971
30	Georges Bizet	Gallipoli	"The Pearl Fishers' Duet"	1981
31	Wolfgang Amadeus Mozart	Elvira Madigan	Piano Concerto No. 21	1967
32	Monty Norman	James Bond films	"James Bond Theme"	1962
33	Richard Addinsell	Dangerous Moonlight	Warsaw Concerto	1941
34	Henry Mancini	The Pink Panther	Score	1964
35	Elmer Bernstein	The Magnificent Seven	Score	1960
36	George Gershwin	Manhattan	Rhapsody in Blue	1979
37	Paul Dukas	Fantasia	The Sorcerer's Apprentice	1940
38	Max Steiner	Gone with the Wind	Score	1939
39	George Gershwin	An American in Paris	An American in Paris	1951
40	Wolfgang Amadeus Mozart	Out of Africa	Clarinet Concerto	1985
41	Nigel Westlake	Antarctica	Score	1991
42	Nino Rota	The Godfather	Score	1972
43	Tan Dun	Crouching Tiger, Hidden Dragon	Score	2000
44	Stanley Myers	The Deer Hunter	Score (inc. "Cavatina")	1978
45	Gustav Mahler	Death in Venice	Symphony No. 5	1971
46	Johann Sebastian Bach	Master and Commander: The Far Side of the World	Cello Suite No. 1	2003
47	Bernard Herrmann	Psycho	Score	1960
48	Johann Sebastian Bach	Fantasia	Toccata and Fugue in D minor	1940
49	Malcolm Arnold	The Bridge on the River Kwai	Score	1957
50	Camille Saint-Saëns	Babe	Symphony No. 3	1995
51	Henry Mancini	Breakfast at Tiffany's	Score	1961
52	Edward Elgar	Hilary and Jackie	Cello Concerto	1998
53	Giacomo Puccini	A Room with a View	"O mio babbino caro" from Gianni Schicchi	1985
54	Hans Zimmer, Lisa Gerrard	Gladiator	Score	2000
55	Johann Sebastian Bach	The English Patient	Goldberg Variations	1996
56	Francis Lai	A Man and a Woman (Un homme et un femme)	Score	1966
57	Yann Tiersen	Amélie	Score	2001
58	Hans Zimmer	The Lion King	Score	1994
59	Charlie Chaplin	Limelight	Score	1952
60	Ludwig van Beethoven	The King's Speech	Symphony No. 7	2010
61	Bruce Rowland	The Man from Snowy River	Score	1982
62	Johann Strauss II	2001: A Space Odyssey	"The Blue Danube"	1968
63	Philip Glass	Koyaanisqatsi, Powaqqatsi, Naqoyqatsi	Score	1982, 1988, 2002
64	John Barry	Born Free	Score	1966
65	Vangelis	Blade Runner	Score	1982
66	Sergei Rachmaninoff	Brief Encounter	Piano Concerto No. 2	1945
67	Hubert Parry	Chariots of Fire	"Jerusalem"	1981
68	Various (inc. Cliff Eidelman, Michael Giacchino, Jerry Goldsmith, James Horner, Dennis McCarthy and Leonard Rosenman)	Star Trek	Score	1979–2013
69	John Williams	Superman	Score	1978
70	Sergei Rachmaninoff	Shine	Piano Concerto No. 3	1996
71	Edward Elgar	Elizabeth	"Nimrod" from Enigma Variations	1998
72	Jean-Michel Jarre	Gallipoli	Oxygène	1981
73	Elmer Bernstein	The Great Escape	Score	1963
74	Ernest Gold	Exodus	Score	1960
75	Claude Debussy	Ocean's Eleven	"Clair de lune" from Suite bergamasque	2001
76	Burt Bacharach	Butch Cassidy and the Sundance Kid	Score	1969
77	Larry Adler	Genevieve	Score	1953
78	Gabriel Yared	The English Patient	Score	1996
79	Ry Cooder	Paris, Texas	Score	1984
80	Bernard Herrmann	North by Northwest	Score	1959
81	Edward Elgar	Brassed Off	Pomp and Circumstance No. 1	1996
82	Patrick Doyle	Sense and Sensibility	Score	1995
83	Nino Rota	Romeo and Juliet	Score	1968
84	Maurice Ravel	10	Boléro	1979
85	Philip Glass	The Hours	Score	2002
86	John Barry	Midnight Cowboy	Score	1969
87	Johann Sebastian Bach	Truly, Madly, Deeply	Brandenburg Concerto No. 3	1990
88	Howard Shore	The Hobbit: An Unexpected Journey	Score	2012
89	James Horner	Titanic	Score	1997
90	Johann Sebastian Bach	Schindler's List	English Suite No. 2	1993
91	Nigel Westlake	Miss Potter	Score	2006
92	Alfredo Catalani	Diva	"Ebben? Ne andrò lontana" from La Wally	1981
93	Bernard Herrmann	Vertigo	Score	1958
94	Max Steiner	Casablanca	Score	1942
95	Ralph Vaughan Williams	The Year My Voice Broke	The Lark Ascending	1987
96	John Williams	Jurassic Park	Score	1993
97	Dario Marianelli	Pride & Prejudice	Score	2005
98	Luis Bacalov	Il Postino: The Postman	Score	1994
99	John Williams	E.T. the Extra-Terrestrial	Score	1982
100	George Frideric Handel	Four Weddings and a Funeral	"The Arrival of the Queen of Sheba"	1994

== Programming ==
For more information about the works broadcast (including performers and recording details), see ABC Classic FM's programming notes:

- Numbers 100 to 52
- Numbers 51 to 38
- Numbers 37 to 1

== See also ==
- Classic 100 Countdowns
