= Classic 100 Mozart =

The following is a summary of the Classic 100 Mozart survey conducted by the ABC Classic FM radio station during 2006.

== Survey summary ==
Rank	K. V.	Work	Key	Date	Movement
100	540	Adagio in B minor	B minor	1788	
99	384	Abduction from the Seraglio		1782	"Ha! Wie will ich triumphieren"
98	453	Piano Concerto No. 17	G major	1784	Andante
97	415	Piano Concerto No. 15	C major	1784	Allegro (III)
96	453	Piano Concerto No. 17	G major	1784	Allegretto
95	620	The Magic Flute		1791	"Ach, ich fühl's"
94	527	Don Giovanni		1787	"Finch' han dal vino"
93	384	Abduction from the Seraglio		1782	Overture
92	450	Piano Concerto No. 15	B♭ major	1784	Andante
91	511	Rondo for Piano	A minor	1787	
90	620	The Magic Flute		1791	"Ein Mädchen oder Weibchen"
89	427	Great Mass in C minor	C minor	1783	Kyrie
88	491	Piano Concerto No. 24	C minor	1786	Larghetto
87	427	Great Mass in C minor	C minor	1783	Et incarnatus est
86	545	Piano Sonata Facile	C major	1788	Andante
85	216	Violin Concerto no. 3	G major	1775	Allegro
84	527	Don Giovanni		1787	Il mio tesoro intanto
83	488	Piano Concerto No. 23	A major	1786	Allegro
82	361	Serenade Gran Partita	B♭ major	1784	Romanze
81	551	Symphony No. 41 Jupiter	C major	1788	Allegro vivace
80	595	Piano Concerto No. 27	B♭ major	1791	Larghetto
79	492	The Marriage of Figaro		1786	"Non più andrai"
78	527	Don Giovanni		1787	"Deh, vieni alla finestra"
77	581	Clarinet Quintet	A major	1789	Allegretto con Variazioni
76	315	Andante for Flute and Orchestra	C major	1778	
75	427	Great Mass in C minor	C minor	1783	Credo
74	208	Il re pastore		1775	L'amerò, sarò constante
73	397	Fantasia no. 3	D minor	1782	
72	620	The Magic Flute		1791	"O Isis und Osiris"
71	626	Requiem		1791	Domine Jesu
70	527	Don Giovanni		1787	"Madamina, il catalogo è questo"
69	626	Requiem		1791	Communio
68	626	Requiem		1791	Benedictus
67	448	Sonata for two Pianos	D major	1781	Andante
66	620	The Magic Flute		1791	"Dies Bildnis ist bezaubernd schön"
65	626	Requiem		1791	Rex tremendae
64	361	Serenade Gran Partita	B♭ major	1784	Largo
63	317	Mass Coronation	C major	1779	Agnus Dei
62	331	Piano Sonata Alla Turca	A major	1783	Tema. Andante grazioso
61	364	Sinfonia concertante for Violin and Viola	E♭ major	1779	Presto
60	527	Don Giovanni		1787	Overture
59	626	Requiem		1791	Tuba mirum
58	365	Concerto for two Pianos	E♭ major	1779	Rondeaux. Allegro
57	626	Requiem		1791	Agnus Dei
56	626	Requiem		1791	Kyrie eleison
55	382	Rondo for piano and orchestra	D major	?	
54	620	The Magic Flute		1791	Overture
53	545	Piano Sonata Facile	C major	1788	Allegro
52	299	Concerto for Flute and Harp	C major	1788	Rondeau. Allegro
51	581	Clarinet Quintet	A major	1789	Allegro
50	620	The Magic Flute		1791	"In diesen heil'gen Hallen"
49	595	Piano Concerto No. 27	B♭ major	1791	Allegro (III)
48	620	The Magic Flute		1791	"Bei Männern, welche Liebe fühlen"
47	527	Don Giovanni		1787	Finale
46	488	Piano Concerto No. 23	A major	1786	Allegro assai
45	550	Symphony No. 40	G minor	1788	Allegro assai
44	183	Symphony No. 25	G minor	1773	Allegro con brio
43	626	Requiem		1791	Confutatis
42	299	Concerto for Flute and Harp	C major	1788	Allegro
41	492	The Marriage of Figaro		1786	"Porgi amor qualche ristoro"
40	620	The Magic Flute		1791	"Pa-pa-pa-geno" (Finale)
39	620	The Magic Flute		1791	"Der Vogelfänger bin ich ja"
38	466	Piano Concerto No. 20	D minor	1785	Allegro
37	366	Idomeneo		1780	"Andrò ramingo e solo"
36	492	The Marriage of Figaro	B♭ major	1786	Sull'aria...che soave zeffiretto
35	265	Ah vous dirai-je, Maman		1782	
34	364	Sinfonia concertante for Violin and Viola	E♭ major	1779	Allegro maestoso
33	525	Eine kleine Nachtmusik	G major	1787	Romanze. Andante
32	216	Violin Concerto no. 3	G major	1775	Adagio
31	525	Eine kleine Nachtmusik	G major	1787	Rondo. Allegro
30	492	The Marriage of Figaro		1786	Finale
29	527	Don Giovanni		1787	"Là ci darem la mano"
28	495	Horn Concerto No. 4	E♭ major	1786	Rondo. Allegro vivace
27	492	The Marriage of Figaro		1786	"Voi, che sapete"
26	551	Symphony No. 41 Jupiter	C major	1788	Molto Allegro
25	626	Requiem		1791	Requiem aeternam
24	492	The Marriage of Figaro		1786	"Dove sono i bei momenti"
23	581	Clarinet Quintet	A major	1789	Larghetto
22	466	Piano Concerto No. 20	D minor	1785	Romance Streicher
21	467	Piano Concerto No. 21	C major	1785	Allegro maestoso
20	626	Requiem		1791	Dies irae
19	550	Symphony No. 40	G minor	1788	Molto allegro
18	525	Eine kleine Nachtmusik	G major	1787	Allegro
17	622	Clarinet Concerto	A major	1791	Rondo. Allegro
16	299	Concerto for Flute and Harp	C major	1788	Andantino
15	364	Sinfonia concertante for Violin and Viola	E♭ major	1779	Andante
14	331	Piano Sonata Alla Turca	A major	1783	Allegretto
13	344	Zaide		1779	"Ruhe sanft, mein holdes Leben"
12	492	The Marriage of Figaro		1786	Overture
11	622	Clarinet Concerto	A major	1791	Allegro
10	165	Exsultate, jubilate		1773	Allelujah
9	488	Piano Concerto No. 23	A major	1786	Adagio
8	361	Serenade Gran Partita	B♭ major	1784	Adagio
7	620	The Magic Flute		1791	"Der Hölle Rache kocht in meinem Herzen"
6	339	Vesperae solennes de confessore		1780	Laudate Dominum
5	626	Requiem		1791	Lacrimosa
4	588	Così fan tutte		1789	"Soave sia il vento"
3	467	Piano Concerto No. 21	C major	1785	Andante
2	618	Ave Verum Corpus	D major	1791	
1	622	Clarinet Concerto	A major	1791	Adagio

== See also ==
- Wolfgang Amadeus Mozart
- Classic 100 Countdowns
