= Antarctica Suite =

Composition by Nigel Westlake

Antarctica Suite (1991) is a composition for orchestra and solo guitar by Australian composer Nigel Westlake, which he adapted as a stand-alone work from his score for the IMAX documentary film Antarctica. The suite was commissioned by the Australian Broadcasting Corporation ABC to mark its 60th anniversary. It is divided into four movements:

1. Last Place on Earth
2. Wooden Ships
3. Penguin Ballet
4. Ice Core/Finale

The Antarctica Suite was originally recorded by the Tasmanian Symphony Orchestra with Tim Kain on guitar. The work was voted number 29 in the 2011 Classic 100 Twentieth Century (ABC), number 36 in the Classic 100 Swoon (ABC) in 2015, and 38 in Classic 100 Music For the Screen in 2022.
