= Classic 100 Piano (ABC) =

Australian classical music poll

During 2004, the Australian radio station ABC Classic FM held a Classic 100 Piano countdown.

The works in the countdown were selected by votes cast by almost 10,000 listeners to the station.

The broadcasting of the results of the countdown began on 10 February 2005 and concluded on 12 February 2005.

== Survey summary ==
The results of the countdown are as follows:

Rank	Composer	Work
100	Pärt	Für Alina
99	Schumann	Arabesque in C, Op. 18
98	Ravel	Sonatine (1905)
97	Schubert	Impromptu No. 2 in A♭ major, D. 935/Op. 142
96	Albéniz	Iberia
95	Liszt	Paraphrase on themes from Verdi's Rigoletto
94	Grainger	"Handel in the Strand"
93	Schubert	Moments Musicaux, Op. 94 D. 780
92	Chopin	Andante Spianato in G, Op. 22
91	Brahms	Waltz in A♭, Op. 39 No. 15
90	Schubert	Ständchen, No. 4 from Schwanengesang, D. 957 (transcribed by Liszt for piano)
89	Joplin	Solace
88	Brahms	Rhapsody in G minor, Op. 79 No. 2
87	Chopin	Prelude No. 4 in E minor, Op. 28 No. 4
86	Beethoven	Piano Sonata No. 26 in E♭ Les Adieux, Op. 81a
85	Beethoven	Diabelli Variations, Op. 120
84	Ravel	Le tombeau de Couperin
83	Mozart	Twelve Variations on "Ah vous dirai-je, Maman", K. 265
82	Chopin	Piano Sonata No. 3, Op. 58
81	Beethoven	Piano Sonata No. 31 in A♭, Op. 110
80	Messiaen	Vingt regards sur l'enfant-Jésus
79	Debussy	Arabesque No. 1
78	Chopin	Étude Op. 25 No. 1 in A♭ major
77	Chopin	Barcarolle in F♯, Op. 60
76	Tchaikovsky	The Seasons
75	Schumann	Fantasie in C major, Op. 17
74	Mozart	Fantasia in D minor, K. 397
73	Shostakovich	24 Preludes and Fugues
72	Chopin	Nocturne No. 20 in C♯ minor, Op. posth
71	Brahms	Variations and Fugue on a Theme by Handel, Op. 24
70	Schubert	Impromptu No. 2 in E♭ major, D. 899/Op. 90
69	Satie	Gymnopedie, No. 3
68	Chopin	Nocturne in C minor, Op. 48 No.1
67	Blake	"Walking in the Air"
66	Bach, JS	Italian Concerto, BWV 971
65	Sculthorpe	Left Bank Waltz
64	Liszt	Un sospiro, Concert Etude No. 3 in D♭ major
63	Granados	The Maiden and the Nightingale from Goyescas
62	Beethoven	Piano Sonata No. 30 in E major, Op. 109
61	Ravel	Gaspard de la nuit
60	Chopin	Piano Sonata No. 2 in B♭ minor, Op. 35
59	Chopin	Nocturne No. 8 in D♭ major, Op. 27 No. 2
58	Bach, JS	Chaconne in D minor from Partita No. 2 for Solo Violin, BWV 1004 (as arranged by Busoni)
57	Satie	Gnossienne, No.1
56	Chopin	Berceuse in D♭ major, Opus 57
55	Ravel	Pavane pour une infante défunte
54	Liszt	Consolation No. 3 in D♭ major (Lento placido)
53	Chopin	Nocturne No. 1 in B♭ minor, Op. 9 No. 1
52	Chopin	Ballade No. 4 in F minor, Op. 52
51	Beethoven	Piano Sonata No. 17 in D minor, "The Tempest", Op. 31 No. 2
50	Schubert	Impromptu No. 3 in B♭ major, D. 935/Op. 142
49	Joplin	"The Entertainer"
48	Rachmaninov	Prelude in G minor, Op. 23 No. 5
47	Chopin	Prelude No. 15 in D♭, "Raindrop"
46	Nyman	"The Heart Asks Pleasure First" from The Piano (soundtrack)
45	Chopin	Polonaise in A major, Op. 40 No. 1, "Military"
44	Schumann	Of foreign lands and people from Kinderszenen, Op. 15
43	Schumann	Carnaval, Op. 9
42	Mozart	Piano Sonata No. 16 in C, K 545, Sonata Facile
41	Debussy	Prelude No. 10, La cathédrale engloutie (The sunken cathedral)
40	Cage	4′33″
39	Beethoven	Piano Sonata No. 29 in B♭, Op. 106, Hammerklavier
38	Schumann	Widmung, Liebeslied, S. 566 (transcribed by Liszt)
37	Liszt	Benediction de Dieu dans la solitude from Harmonies poétiques et religieuses
36	Liszt	Liebestraum No. 3 in A♭, S. 541 / III
35	Chopin	Etude Op. 10 No. 12 in C minor, Revolutionary Étude
34	Rachmaninov	Prelude in C♯ minor, Op. 3 No. 2
33	Liszt	Hungarian Rhapsody No. 2 in C♯ minor, S.244/2
32	Brahms	Intermezzo Op. 118 No. 2 in A major
31	Jarrett	The Köln Concert
30	Liszt	Grandes études de Paganini, No. 3 in G♯ minor, La Campanella
29	Chopin	Étude Op. 10 No. 3 in E
28	Liszt	Piano Sonata in B minor, S. 178
27	Debussy	Prelude No. 8, La fille aux cheveux de lin ("The Girl with the Flaxen Hair")
26	Beethoven	Sonata No. 32 in C minor, Op. 111
25	Schubert	Impromptu No. 4 in A♭ major, D. 899/Op. 90
24	Bach, JS	Jesu, Joy of Man's Desiring (piano transcription by Myra Hess)
23	Sinding	Rustle of Spring
22	Schubert	Fantasie in C major, Op. 15 (D. 760), Wanderer Fantasy
21	Mozart	Piano Sonata No. 11 in A major, K. 331
20	Chopin	Ballade No. 1, Op. 23
19	Grieg	Bryllupsdag på Troldhaugen (Wedding Day at Troldhaugen)
18	Chopin	Nocturne No. 2 in E♭ major, Op. 9 No. 2
17	Schumann	Träumerei from Kinderszenen ("Scenes from Childhood"), Op. 15
16	Chopin	Polonaise in A♭ major, Op. 53, "Heroic"
15	Beethoven	"Für Elise"
14	Schubert	Fantasia in F minor for piano four hands, D. 940 Op. 103
13	Chopin	Fantaisie-Impromptu in C♯ minor, Op. 66
12	Beethoven	Piano Sonata No. 21 in C major, Op. 53, Waldstein
11	Mussorgsky	Pictures at an Exhibition
10	Beethoven	Piano Sonata No. 23 in F minor, Op. 57, Appassionata
9	Schubert	Piano Sonata No. 21 in B♭ major, D. 960
8	Bach, JS	The Well-Tempered Clavier
7	Allen	Chopsticks
6	Schubert	Impromptu No. 3 in G♭ major, D. 899/Op. 90
5	Beethoven	Piano Sonata No. 8 in C minor, Op. 13, Pathétique
4	Satie	Gymnopédie No.1
3	Debussy	"Clair de lune" from Suite bergamasque
2	Bach, JS	Goldberg Variations
1	Beethoven	Piano Sonata No. 14 in C♯ minor, Op. 27 No. 2, Moonlight

== By composer ==
The following 29 composers were featured in the countdown:

Composer	Nationality	Works
Albéniz	Spanish	1
Allen	British	1
Bach, JS	German	5
Beethoven	German	12
Blake	British	1
Brahms	German	4
Cage	American	1
Chopin	Polish	20
Debussy	French	4
Grainger	Australian	1
Granados	Spanish	1
Grieg	Norwegian	1
Jarrett	American	1
Joplin	American	2
Liszt	Hungarian	8
Messiaen	French	1
Mozart	Austrian	4
Mussorgsky	Russian	1
Nyman	British	1
Pärt	Estonian	1
Rachmaninoff	Russian	2
Ravel	French	4
Satie	French	3
Schubert	Austrian	10
Schumann	German	6
Sculthorpe	Australian	1
Shostakovich	Russian	1
Sinding	Norwegian	1
Tchaikovsky	Russian	1

== See also ==
- Classic 100 Countdowns
