= Doctor Zhivago (soundtrack) =

1965 soundtrack album by Maurice Jarre

Doctor Zhivago: The Original Sound Track Album
- Cover of the original 1965 LP release

Soundtrack album by Maurice Jarre
- Released: 1965
- Length: 34:07
- Label: MGM Records

Doctor Zhivago: The Original Sound Track Album is the soundtrack album composed by Maurice Jarre for the 1965 film Doctor Zhivago. The soundtrack garnered critical acclaim and won the Academy Award for Best Music Score—Substantially Original and the Grammy Award for Best Original Score Written for a Motion Picture or Television Show.

== Background ==
Composer Maurice Jarre had previously worked with director David Lean, scoring Lean's 1962 film Lawrence of Arabia and winning the Academy Award for Best Music Score - Substantially Original in 1963. Although the two had not been in contact since Lawrence of Arabia, Lean summoned Jarre to the Doctor Zhivago set in Madrid in 1965. MGM Records's music director was initially hesitant about Lean's choice of Jarre as composer, stating that, "Jarre is very good for open spaces and sand. We have better composers here in Hollywood for Russia and snow."

== Production ==
Jarre drew inspiration from Russian composers Tchaikovsky and Rimsky-Korsakov to score the film. To give the soundtrack its exotic feel, in addition to a traditional orchestra Jarre utilized a harpsichord, a zither, a koto, two shamisens, a 6-foot gong, a sonovox, a Novachord, an electric piano, and 24 balalaikas; however, since no member of the MGM Studio Orchestra could play the balalaika, Jarre had to recruit players from a Russian Orthodox church in downtown Los Angeles. The Moog synthesizer, which had very recently been invented at the time of the film's release in 1965, was also used by Jarre in composing the soundtrack. In addition to his unique instrumentation, Jarre also utilized a chorus of 40 voices that required 20 microphones and six audio engineers to record the score.

Perhaps the most well-known aspect of the soundtrack is "Lara's Theme". "Lara's Theme" is used as a leitmotif and appears in various sections throughout the film. It was quickly composed by Jarre after it was discovered that a Russian folk song that Lean wanted to include in the film was not in the public domain as Lean had originally thought. On Jarre's first attempts at composing a love theme for the film, director David Lean was dissatisfied and instructed Jarre to "Forget about Zhivago; forget about Russia. Go to the mountains with your girlfriend and think about her and write a love theme for her." Lean was adamant that the love theme not be specifically Russian, but rather a universal theme.

Jarre conducted a 110-piece orchestra for ten days to record the soundtrack. He finished recording the soundtrack on 14 December 1965, only eight days before the film's world premiere.

== Legacy and accolades ==
Professional ratings
Review scores
Source	Rating
AllMusic	link

At the 38th Academy Awards, the soundtrack won the Academy Award for Best Music Score—Substantially Original, and at the 9th Annual Grammy Awards, it won the Grammy Award for Best Original Score Written for a Motion Picture or Television Show. It was also nominated for the Grammy Award for Album of the Year. According to Billboard in 1967, the album sold more than 1.4 million copies.

The soundtrack debuted at No. 139 on the Billboard 200 on March 19, 1966. It reached the Billboard 200 number-one position on November 5, 1966, almost one year after the film's release. In 2015, Billboard 200 ranked the soundtrack eighth on their "Greatest Billboard 200 Albums of All Time" list. In Canada the album peaked at No. 2, and was in the top 5 for 17 consecutive charts (January 2–April 29).

In 2013, the soundtrack ranked sixth on the ABC Classic FM Classic 100 Music in the Movies.

Doctor Zhivago is frequently used in competitive figure skating programs. South Korean figure skater Choi Da-bin used a medley from the soundtrack for her free skate at the 2018 Winter Olympics.

== Track listing ==
Side 1
No.	Title	Length
1.	"Overture from Doctor Zhivago"	4:10
2.	"Main Title from Doctor Zhivago"	2:37
3.	"Lara Leaves Yuri"	1:25
4.	"At The Student Cafe"	1:30
5.	"Komarovsky And Lara's Rendezvous"	3:49
6.	"Revolution"	3:59

Side 2
No.	Title	Length
1.	"Lara's Theme from Doctor Zhivago"	2:50
2.	"The Funeral"	3:05
3.	"Sventytski's Waltz"	2:12
4.	"Yuri Escapes"	2:16
5.	"Tonya Arrives At Varykino"	3:39
6.	"Yuri Writes A Poem For Lara"	2:35
Total length:		34:07

== Personnel ==
Credits are adapted from LP booklet notes.

- Composer – Maurice Jarre
- Conductor – Maurice Jarre
- Music editor – Bill Saracino
- Director of engineering – Val Valentin
- Engineer for the record album – Thorne Nogar
- Producer of the record album – Jesse Kaye
- Orchestra – MGM Studio Orchestra
- All compositions – Robbins, Feist & Miller
- Album design – Acy Lehman
- Booklet design – Sy Taffet
- Booklet text – Nelson Lyon

== Charts ==
Chart (1966–67)	Peak position
Italian Albums (HitParadeItalia)	1
