= Rondo for Piano and Orchestra in D major (Mozart) =

Composition by Wolfgang Amadeus Mozart

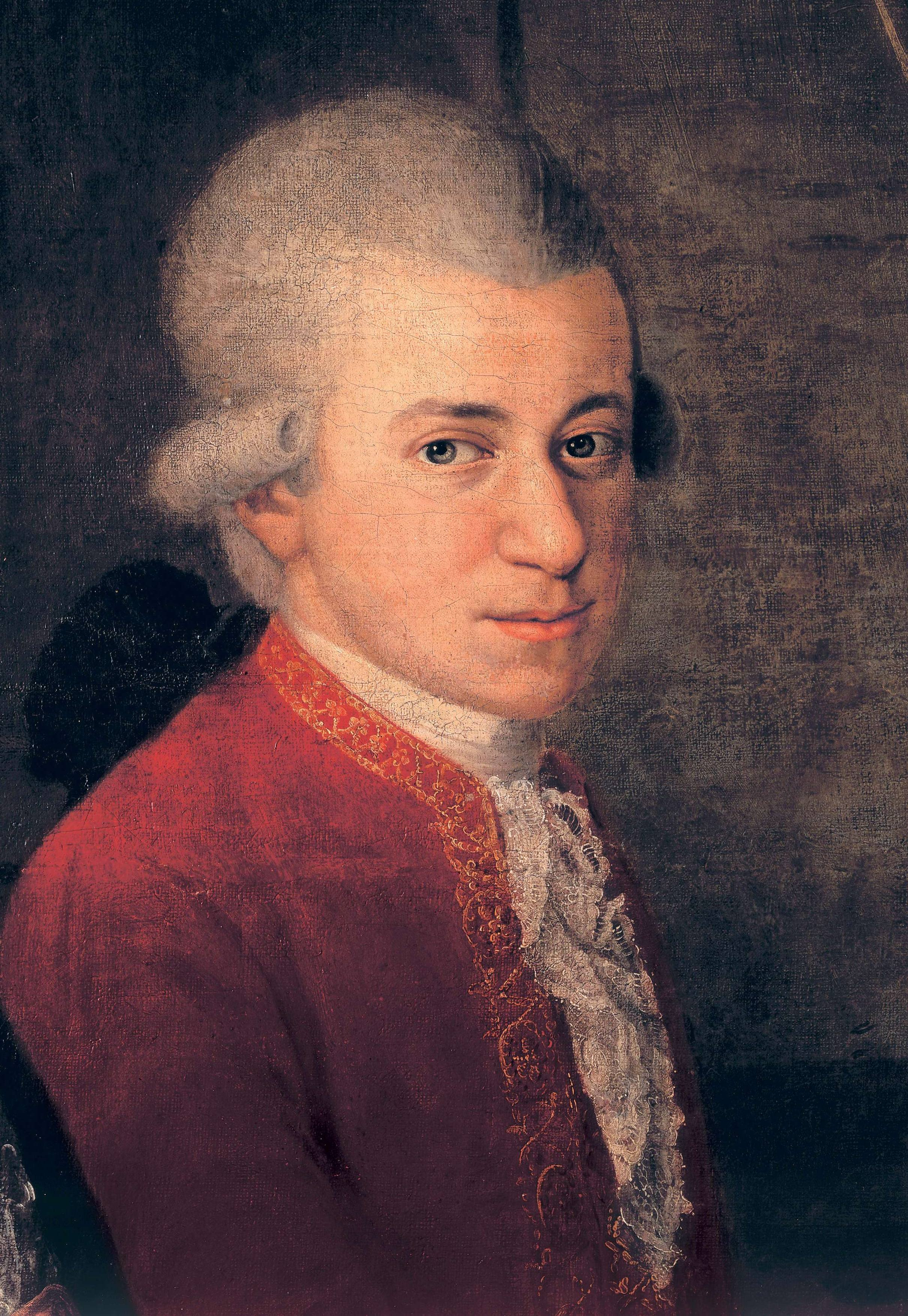
Detail of Wolfgang from the 1780–81 Portrait of the Mozart Family

The Rondo for Piano and Orchestra in D major, K. 382 is a set of variations by Wolfgang Amadeus Mozart intended as a substitute finale for his Piano Concerto No. 5 in D major.

== Background ==
The piece was composed in early 1782 by Mozart as an alternative final movement to his Piano Concerto No. 5, a piece he composed in December 1773 when he was 17. He composed the Rondo for a number of reasons. He considered the use of a Sonata-form movement too complex for the movement's context, and thus he wrote this alternative ending in a variation form. Mozart had also just moved from his hometown Salzburg to Vienna in 1781, where he needed to gain a reputation and a subsequent secure income. He did this through composition, teaching and piano performances in concerts. As he did not have too many original piano concertos to his name this was an area where Mozart could draw work from. His 5th piano concerto had been a great success in Mannheim, which he had visited on his 1777 journey to Paris. Thus, he revised the work to make it more suitable for his Viennese audience at the upcoming important Lenten concert on 3 March 1782. This led to the composition of the Rondo in D in the months before the concert, where it was performed for the first time. The Rondo was a more tuneful alternative to its predecessor and thus it was very popular with the audience; indeed, in the concert it was encored.

== Instrumentation ==
As it is in effect a substitute finale to the Piano Concerto No. 5, the instrumentation for the Rondo is very nearly the same. Other than the solo piano, the Concerto's instrumentation consists of two oboes, two trumpets, two French horns, timpani and strings. The Rondo uses this ensemble too, but adds one flute.

== Analysis ==
The Rondo in D is, formally, not a rondo at all but a set of variations. It is marked Allegretto grazioso and contains two tempo changes, Adagio and Allegro respectively, before returning to the initial tempo soon before the end. The total duration is about 10 minutes, which is much longer than the movement it replaced, which generally lasts just over 5 minutes.
