= The Lark Ascending (Vaughan Williams) =

1914 composition by Ralph Vaughan Williams

Vaughan Williams at about the time of the composition of The Lark Ascending

The Lark Ascending is a short, single-movement work by the English composer Ralph Vaughan Williams, inspired by the 1881 poem of the same name by the English writer George Meredith. It was originally for violin and piano, completed in 1914, but not performed until 1920. The composer reworked it for solo violin and orchestra after the First World War. This version, in which the work is chiefly known, was first performed in 1921. It is subtitled "A Romance", a term that Vaughan Williams favoured for contemplative slow music.

The work has gained considerable popularity in Britain and elsewhere and has been much recorded between 1928 and the present day.

== Background ==
Among the enthusiasms of the composer Ralph Vaughan Williams were poetry and the violin. He had trained as a violinist as a boy, and greatly preferred the violin to the piano, for which he never had a great fondness. His literary tastes were wide-ranging, and among the English poets of the 19th and early 20th centuries whom he admired were Tennyson, Swinburne, Christina and Dante Gabriel Rossetti, Hardy, Housman, and George Meredith. Before the composition of The Lark Ascending, Vaughan Williams had inscribed a verse by Meredith above an early score, now lost.

The composer's second wife, Ursula, herself a poet, wrote that in The Lark Ascending Vaughan Williams had "taken a literary idea on which to build his musical thought … and had made the violin become both the bird's song and its flight, being, rather than illustrating the poem from which the title was taken". At the head of the score, Vaughan Williams wrote out twelve lines from Meredith's 122-line poem:

He rises and begins to round,
He drops the silver chain of sound,
Of many links without a break,
In chirrup, whistle, slur and shake.

For singing till his heaven fills,
'Tis love of earth that he instils,
And ever winging up and up,
Our valley is his golden cup
And he the wine which overflows
to lift us with him as he goes.

Till lost on his aerial rings
In light, and then the fancy sings. (Note: The three extracts are, respectively, the opening lines, lines 63–70, and the closing two lines.)

It is not known when and where Vaughan Williams composed the piece. The filmmaker Tony Palmer is reported as saying that it was written while Vaughan Williams was staying in Margate, on the southeast coast of England, at the beginning of the First World War, while Vanessa Thorpe suggested he was inspired while walking on the nearby cliffs. In her biography of her husband, Ursula Vaughan Williams records that her husband was at Margate at the time and that he later recounted that a small Boy Scout performed a citizen's arrest of him, imagining the jottings he was making in his notebook were "Maps … information for the enemy", but there is no suggestion that the jottings were of The Lark Ascending, and she adds that according to her husband's friend George Butterworth they were notes for a lecture on Henry Purcell. The original manuscript has been lost. The soloist for whom the work was written and to whom it is dedicated was Marie Hall, a leading British violinist of the time, a former pupil of Edward Elgar, and celebrated for her interpretation of that composer's Violin Concerto. She worked with Vaughan Williams on the new piece before the premiere, and may have influenced some details of the score, though if so, the extent is unknown.

== First performances ==
The premiere of the violin and piano version was given by Hall and the pianist Geoffrey Mendham (1899–1984) at the Shirehampton Public Hall on 15 December 1920. (Note: On 15 December 2020 Jennifer Pike played the original version in a centenary concert at the Shirehampton Public Hall, replicating part of the 1920 programme.) Hall was again the soloist in the first performance of the orchestral version, in the Queen's Hall, London, on 14 June 1921, at a concert presented by the British Music Society. The British Symphony Orchestra was conducted by Adrian Boult. The music critic of The Times (Note: H. C. Colles was the paper's music critic at the time, but reviews in The Times were unsigned.) noted that The Lark Ascending was not the main item on the programme, which featured an early performance of Holst's The Planets, but it made a favourable impression. He commented that it:

stood apart from the rest as the only work in the programme which showed serene disregard of the fashions of to-day or of yesterday. It dreams its way along in "many links without a break", and though it never rises to the energy of the lines "He is the dance of children, thanks Of sowers, shout for primrose banks," the music is that of the clean countryside, not of the sophisticated concert-room.

The critic A. H. Fox Strangways wrote in Music & Letters:

The violin floats in a long rapture over some homegrown tunes in the accompaniment, taking little bits of them into its song at intervals. Violin cadenzas are apt to have a family likeness, but these jubilations will hardly remind anybody of anything else. There is very little of the harmless necessary arpeggio or of ingeniously wonderful double stops. It is pure carolling.

== Musical analysis ==
The typical playing time of the piece is between 13 and 16 minutes. (Note: Timings of some recordings in the catalogues in 2019 are 13 minutes:14 seconds (soloist – Sarah Chang, Parlophone CD 5099962791052, 5 July 2010); 13:31 (Pinchas Zukerman, Deutsche Grammophon CD 00028946937624, 31 March 2003); 14:41 (Hugh Bean, Parlophone CD 5099972914755, 5 March 2012); 14:41 seconds (Iona Brown, Decca CD 00028947856924, 22 July 2013);16:00 (Nicola Benedetti, Deutsche Grammophon CD 00028947661986, 24 September 2007); 16:19 (Hilary Hahn, Deutsche Grammophon CD 00028947450429, 6 September 2004). Nigel Kennedy's EMI recording, at 17:30, is an exception to the norm.) It begins with a two-bar introduction by woodwind and muted strings in 6/8 time, after which the soloist enters with an unaccompanied cadenza marked pianissimo and sur la touche (that is, placing the bow over the fingerboard, which reduces the higher harmonics and gives an ethereal tone). The cadenza is written "senza misura" – without bar-lines – which Grove's Dictionary of Music and Musicians defines as "freely", "without strict regard for the metre".

Towards the end of the cadenza Vaughan Williams introduces a melody with which the solo violin continues when the orchestra re-enters, in 2/4:

A second, unaccompanied cadenza, shorter than the first, leads to a contrasting episode (Allegretto tranquillo quasi andante) with a new melody for flutes:

A section marked Allegro tranquillo (Note: Vaughan Williams added a note in the score that this section is to be taken at two beats to the bar.) begins with solo violin trills, punctuated by off-beat triangle (the only percussion in the piece). The key, which has been a somewhat ambiguous G major up to this point, (Note: With regard to the ambiguity of the key, Frank Howes comments "the key [is] vague: it might be D Dorian, a contingent B minor or a suppressed G major (which has the support of the key signature). The second tune and its harmony is equally indecisive between C major and G major.") changes to F major, and the time switches to 6/8. The oboe enters after five bars with another new melody marked scherzando:

The melody introduced by the flutes returns, (now marked Allegretto molto tranquillo) played by the violin soloist, and is followed by a reprise of the earlier 6/8 section. The work ends with the unaccompanied violin in a closing cadenza which reaches up to a D in altissimo (i.e., two octaves above the treble staff) and then drops again a minor third on to B.

Christopher Mark has analysed The Lark Ascending in terms of the composer's use of modes. He finds that the work begins in the Dorian mode, and switches between that and the Aeolian mode interspersed with extensive use of the pentatonic scale.

== Alternative versions ==
The orchestral version is scored for solo violin with an orchestra of two flutes, one oboe, two clarinets, two bassoons, two horns, triangle and strings. Vaughan Williams also provided a version for chamber orchestra, with one each of flute, oboe, clarinet, bassoon, horn and triangle, with three or four first violins, the same of second violins, two violas, two cellos and one double bass. Paul Drayton arranged the work in 2019 for a mixed choir, singing wordlessly, and vocal soloists, alongside the solo violinist. The arrangement was commissioned by the Swedish Chamber Choir, who have recorded it under Simon Phipps; it has also been performed by the BBC Singers.

== Critical and public reception ==
The work has prompted a range of aesthetic responses from analysts and reviewers. In his study of the composer's music, Michael Kennedy comments that The Lark Ascending is a unique work, but often underrated "possibly because its very simplicity is deceptive". The critic Paul Conway writes that it "depicts a pastoral scene with the violin imitating the titular songbird and the orchestra … representing the landscape beneath". Christopher Mark similarly sees a distinction between the airborne solo part and the orchestral sections, finding the "folk-like melody" for the flute "shifting the focus from the sky to ground-level and human activity".

The musicologist Lewis Foreman comments, "It is possible to forget what a revolutionary piece this was in the context of the British music of 1914 [with] its rhythmic freedom and flow and its avoidance of tonic-and-dominant cadencing, together with its imagery". Jeffrey Davis writes, "At one level it seems to be an idyll of rural England [but] in view of its composition on the eve of the First World War, there is perhaps an underlying layer of sadness to the music. Rather like the Edwardian era, as viewed retrospectively from the other side of World War One, it seems to reflect nostalgia for a partly mythological lost age of innocence." For Philip Borg-Wheeler, writing in 2014, the piece is "imbued with a profound sense of communion with nature". He adds, "Rather than scorning English pastoralism – as Elisabeth Lutyens and others did with observations such as 'the cowpat school' – we should value this rare quality expressed so perfectly by Vaughan Williams in particular." The same writer draws attention to the parallels between Vaughan Williams and Béla Bartók who, he suggests, both assimilated folk-song characteristics so thoroughly that their own melodic invention became indistinguishable – there is no actual folk-song borrowing in The Lark Ascending.

Frank Howes, in his The Music of Ralph Vaughan Williams written towards the end of the composer's life, observes that the work is distinctively Vaughan Williams's own and "like nothing else in music – Beethoven's two Romances for violin and orchestra are the nearest parallels". Like other commentators, Howes remarks on the composer's choice of the term "A Romance" for the piece. It was a term he applied to some of his most profoundly lyrical utterances such as the slow movements of the Piano Concerto and the Fifth Symphony. Howes adds, "'Romance' for Vaughan Williams is devoid of erotic connotation … The lark may be calling to his mate but it sounds more like joie de vivre on a spring morning with a slight haze in the air."

In polls of listeners to classical music stations in Australia, Britain, New Zealand and the US the work has frequently topped or been high in the polling.

== Recordings ==
External audio
- The Lark Ascending played by Bella Hristova and the DuPage Symphony Orchestra conducted by Barbara Schubert, 2010 archive.org

The work has been recorded frequently. The first recording was made in 1928 by the violinist Isolde Menges with an unnamed orchestra conducted by Malcolm Sargent. Further 78 r.p.m. sets were issued in the 1940s and early 1950s. In a comparative review in Gramophone magazine in 2015, David Gutman compiled a short list of twenty-four recordings, from a 1952 mono set featuring Jean Pougnet, Boult and the London Philharmonic to a 2014 release with Tamsin Waley-Cohen, the Orchestra of the Swan and David Curtis. Soloists include Nicola Benedetti, Sarah Chang, Hilary Hahn, Nigel Kennedy, Tasmin Little and Pinchas Zukerman; among the conductors are Daniel Barenboim, Sir Colin Davis, Bernard Haitink, Sir Neville Marriner, André Previn and Sir Simon Rattle. The reviewer's top recommendation was a 1967 EMI recording by Hugh Bean and the New Philharmonia Orchestra, conducted by Boult. That recording is also the preferred version of Rob Cowan's 1997 Classical 1000.

The version for violin and piano has been recorded by Matthew Trusler and Iain Burnside (2013), and Jennifer Pike and Martin Roscoe (2020).

== Notes, references and sources ==
=== Sources ===
- Cowan, Rob (1998). Guinness Classical Top 1000: The Top 1000 Recordings of All Time. London: Guinness. ISBN 978-0-85112-001-0.
- De Savage, Heather (2013). "Chronology". In Alain Frogley and Aidan Thomson (ed.). The Cambridge Companion to Vaughan Williams. Cambridge: Cambridge University Press. ISBN 978-0-521-19768-7.
- Howes, Frank (1954). The Music of Ralph Vaughan Williams. London: Oxford University Press. OCLC 1058036063.
- Kennedy, Michael (1980) [1964]. The Works of Ralph Vaughan Williams (second ed.). Oxford: Oxford University Press. ISBN 978-0-19-315453-7.
- Lee, Douglas (2002). Masterworks of 20th-century Music: The Modern Repertory of the Symphony Orchestra. New York: Routledge. ISBN 978-0-415-93846-4.
- Mark, Christopher (2013). "Chamber music and solo works with orchestra". In Alain Frogley and Aidan Thomson (ed.). The Cambridge Companion to Vaughan Williams. Cambridge: Cambridge University Press. ISBN 978-0-521-19768-7.
- Vaughan Williams, Ralph (1925). The Lark Ascending. London: Oxford University Press. OCLC 959315093.
- Vaughan Williams, Ursula (1964). RVW: A Biography of Ralph Vaughan Williams. Oxford: Oxford University Press. OCLC 715346031.
- Vaughan Williams, Ursula (1972–1973). "Ralph Vaughan Williams and his Choice of Words for Music". Proceedings of the Royal Musical Association. 99: 81–89. doi:10.1093/jrma/99.1.81. JSTOR 766156. (subscription required)
