= The Lark Ascending =

Poem by George Meredith about the song of the skylark

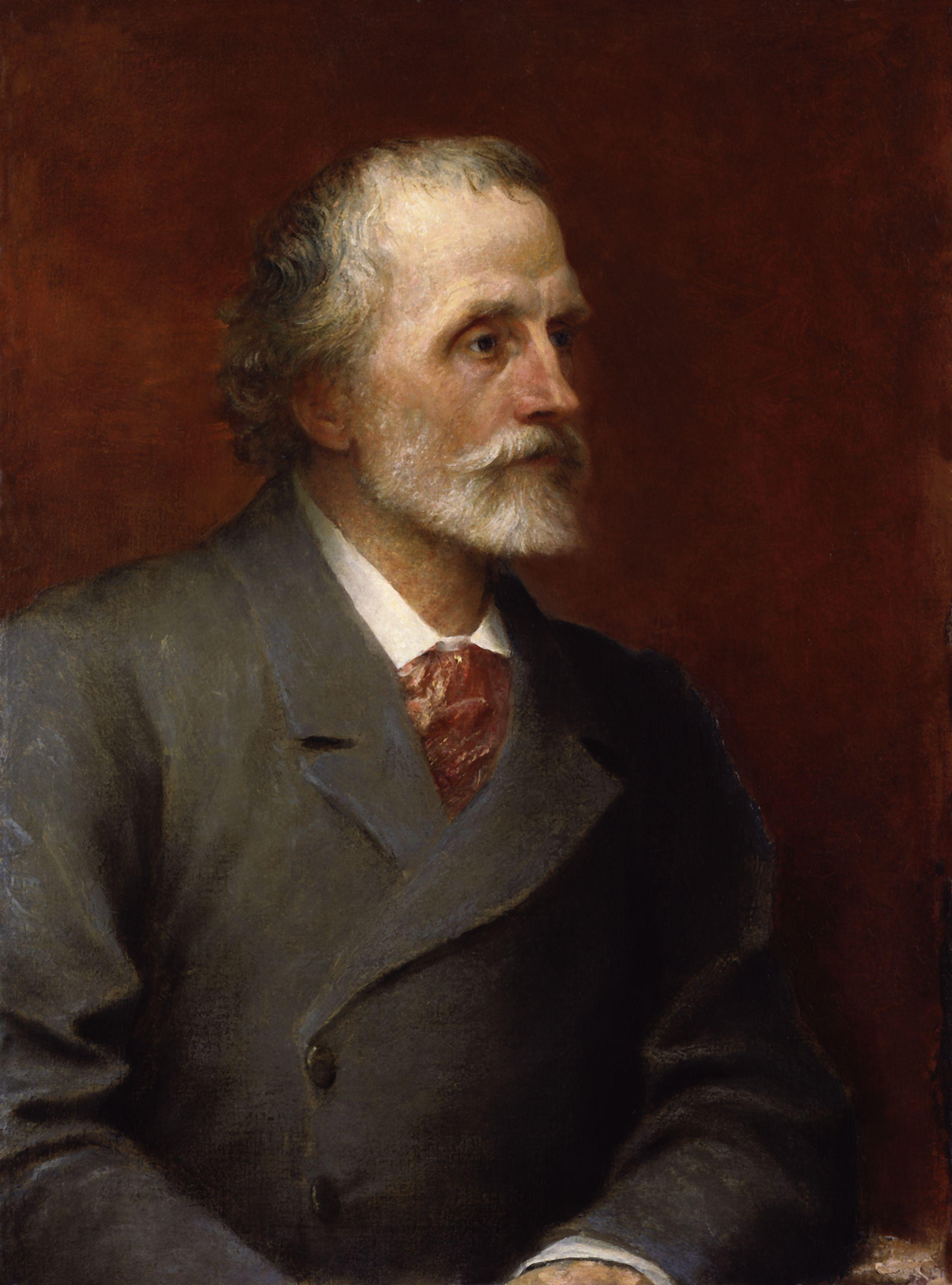
George Meredith in 1893 by G. F. Watts

"The Lark Ascending" is a poem of 122 lines by the English poet George Meredith about the song of the skylark. Siegfried Sassoon called it matchless of its kind, "a sustained lyric which never for a moment falls short of the effect aimed at, soars up and up with the song it imitates, and unites inspired spontaneity with a demonstration of effortless technical ingenuity... one has only to read the poem a few times to become aware of its perfection".

The poem inspired the English composer Ralph Vaughan Williams to write a musical work of the same name, which is now more widely known than the poem.

Meredith's poem The Lark Ascending (1881) is a hymn or paean to the skylark and his song, written in rhyming tetrameter couplets in two long continuous sections. It first appeared in The Fortnightly Review for May 1881, at a time when (as Meredith wrote in March 1881 to Cotter Morison) he was afflicted by "the dreadful curse of Verse". It was then included in his volume Poems and Lyrics of the Joy of Earth, which first appeared in an unsatisfactory edition in June 1883, and a month later was reprinted by Macmillan at the author's expense in a second issue with corrections. Siegfried Sassoon in his commentary on the 1883 Poems ("one of the landmarks of 19th-Century poetry") observed, "to write of such a poem is to be reminded of its incomparable aloofness from the ploddings of the journeyman critic".

Meredith's theme expands upon the sonnet False Poets and True by Thomas Hood (1799–1845), addressed to William Wordsworth, and is of course in debt to Shelley's Ode To a Skylark.
