= Va, pensiero =

Chorus from the opera Nabucco by Giuseppe Verdi

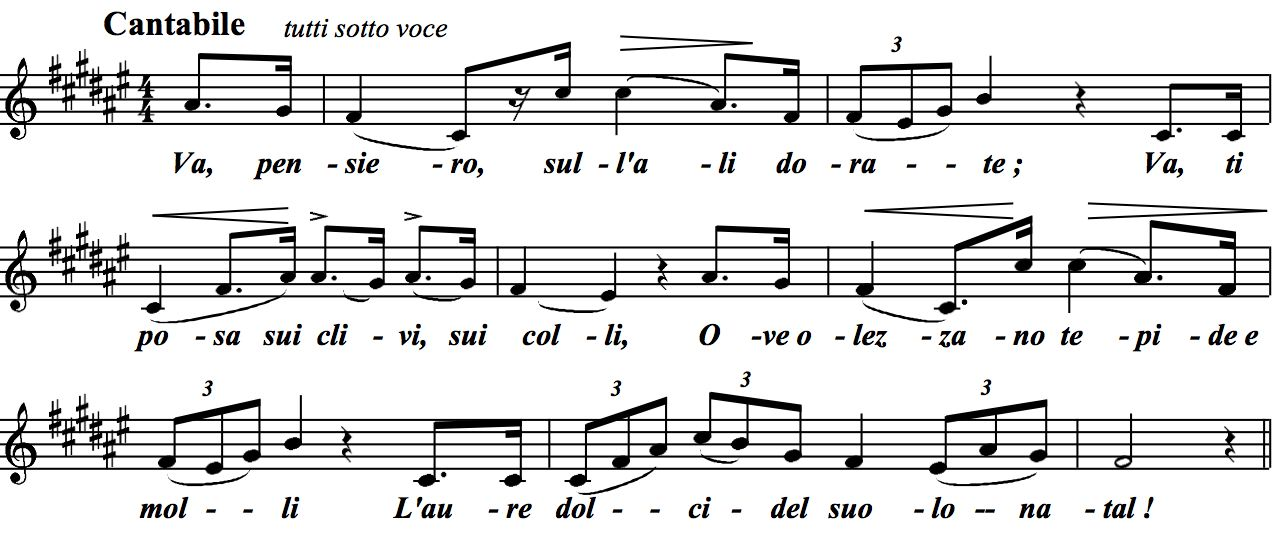
Melody and first verse of "Va, pensiero"

"Va, pensiero" (Italian: [ˈva penˈsjɛːro]), also known as the "Chorus of the Hebrew Slaves", is a chorus from the opera Nabucco (1842) by Giuseppe Verdi. It recollects the period of Babylonian captivity after the destruction of Solomon's Temple in Jerusalem in 586 BC.

The libretto is by Temistocle Solera, inspired by Psalm 137. The opera with its powerful chorus established Verdi as a major composer in 19th-century Italy. The full incipit is "Va, pensiero, sull'ali dorate", meaning "Go, thought, on wings of gold".

== Initial reception ==
Early recording
Orchestra and chorus of La Scala, Carlo Sabajno

Verdi composed Nabucco at a difficult moment in his life. His wife and children had all just died of various illnesses. Despite a purported vow to abstain from opera-writing, he had contracted with La Scala to write another opera and the director, Bartolomeo Merelli, forced the libretto into his hands. Returning home, Verdi happened to open the libretto at "Va, pensiero" and seeing the phrase, he heard the words singing. At first rehearsal "the stagehands shouted their approval, then beat on the floor and the sets with their tools to create an even noisier demonstration". As he was subsequently to note, Verdi felt that "this is the opera with which my artistic career really begins. And though I had many difficulties to fight against, it is certain that Nabucco was born under a lucky star".

When Verdi died, onlookers in Milan's streets spontaneously began singing "Va, pensiero" as his funeral procession passed by. A month later, when he was reinterred alongside his wife at the Casa di Riposo, young Arturo Toscanini conducted a choir of 820 singing the hymn.

== Role in Italian political history ==
Some scholars have thought that the chorus was intended to be an anthem for Italian patriots, who were seeking to unify their country and free it from foreign control in the years up to 1861 (the chorus's theme of exiles singing about their homeland, and its lines like O mia patria, si bella e perduta / "O my country, so beautiful, and lost" was thought to have resonated with many Italians). Some modern scholars have rejected this idea, failing to see connections between Verdi's 1840s and 1850s operas and Italian nationalism, with the exception of some of the sentiments expressed in his 1843 opera, I Lombardi.

Other recent research has discussed several of Verdi's works from the 1840s (including Giovanna d'Arco and Attila) emphasising their ostensible political meaning. Work by Philip Gossett on choruses of the 1840s also suggests that recent revisionist approaches to Verdi and the Risorgimento may have gone too far in their thorough dismissal of the political significance of "Va, pensiero".

On 27 January 1981 the journalist and creative writer Giorgio Soavi proposed replacing Italy's national anthem with "Va, pensiero" in a letter published by Indro Montanelli in his daily newspaper Il Giornale. The proposal was widely discussed for some time and then abandoned until 2009, when Senator Umberto Bossi took it up again, but to no effect. However, Bossi's political party, Lega Nord/Padania, has adopted "Va, pensiero" as its official hymn and the chorus is now sung at all party meetings.

In 2011, after conducting "Va, pensiero" during a performance of Nabucco at the Teatro dell'Opera in Rome, Riccardo Muti made a short speech protesting cuts in Italy's arts budget, then asked the audience to sing along in support of culture and patriotism.

In the film Cabrini, Enrico Caruso refused to help Mother Cabrini in raising funds for a hospital. To persuade him, a chorus of Italian children gather outside of his home and sing this, emotionally invoking images of exile and homeland. The solo is sung by Virginia Bocelli, daughter of Andrea Bocelli.

== Text ==
Va, pensiero, sull'ali dorate;
va, ti posa sui clivi, sui colli,
ove olezzano tepide e molli
l'aure dolci del suolo natal!

Del Giordano le rive saluta,
di Sionne le torri atterrate.
O, mia patria, sì bella e perduta!
O, membranza, sì cara e fatal!

Arpa d'or dei fatidici vati,
perché muta dal salice pendi?
Le memorie nel petto raccendi,
ci favella del tempo che fu!

O simile di Sòlima ai fati
traggi un suono di crudo lamento,
o t'ispiri il Signore un concento
che ne infonda al patire virtù!

Fly, my thoughts, on wings of gold;
go settle upon the slopes and the hills,
where, soft and mild, the sweet airs
of my native land smell fragrant!

Greet the banks of the Jordan
and Zion's toppled towers.
O my homeland, so lovely and lost!
O memories so dear and yet so deadly!

Golden harp of the prophets of old,
why do you now hang silent upon the willow?
Rekindle the memories in our hearts,
and speak of times gone by!

Mindful of the fate of Solomon's temple,
Cry out with raw lamentation,
or else may the Lord strengthen you
to bear these sufferings!

== See also ==
- Italian Neoclassical and 19th-century art
- "By the rivers of Babylon", yearnings of the Jewish people in Babylonian captivity
