= Au fond du temple saint =

Duet in 1863 opera

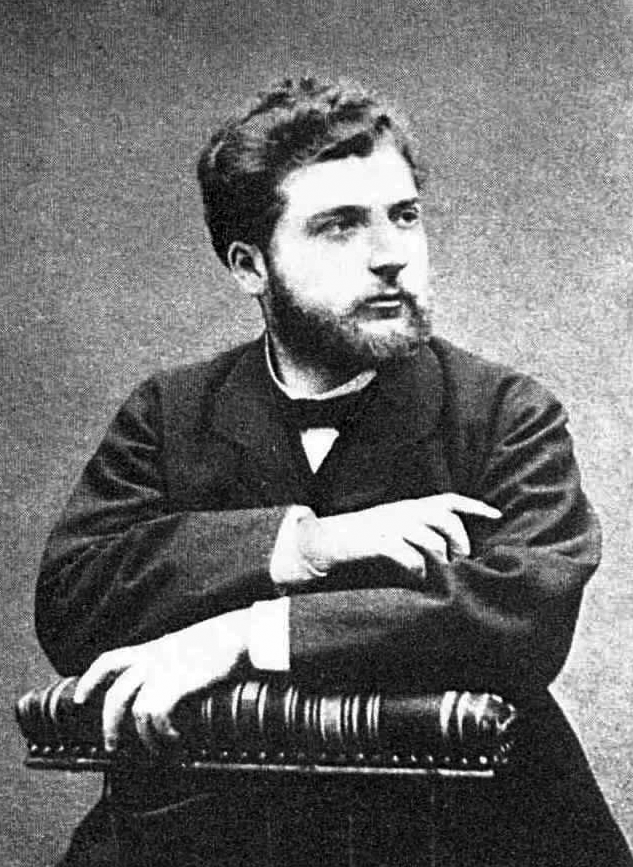
Georges Bizet photographed in about 1860

"Au fond du temple saint" ("At the back of the holy temple") is a duet from Georges Bizet's 1863 opera Les pêcheurs de perles. The libretto was written by Eugène Cormon and Michel Carré. Generally known as "The Pearl Fishers' Duet", it is one of the most popular numbers in Western opera – it appeared on seven of the Classic 100 Countdowns conducted by ABC Classic. It is sung by Nadir (tenor) and Zurga (baritone) in act 1.

== Context ==
After a self-imposed absence, Nadir returns to the shores of Ceylon, where his friend Zurga has just been elected Fisher King by the local pearl fishermen. The two had once fallen in love with the same woman, but then pledged to each other to renounce that love and remain true to each other. On meeting again, they sing this duet, remembering how they first fell in love/were fascinated with a veiled priestess of Brahma whom they saw passing through the adoring crowd.

A key moment in the opera, this duet is the clearest depiction of the triangular relationships between the protagonists. The obvious situation at this point is that males will value their friendship higher than a heterosexual relationship. Peter Weir uses this duet in his 1981 film Gallipoli without the heterosexual aspect, purely to express male mateship and loyalty between a pair of doomed soldiers. A different view is possible by a reading of the duet as a "pair of parallel monologues", emphasizing the rivalry and deceit between the men.

This duet reappears at the end of the opera, but is sung in unison as the soprano Leila and the tenor Nadir sing together of their love which will transcend all their trials—while Zurga sacrifices himself, knowing of their love, as he lets them flee to safety.

== Music ==
Range (transposed 1 octave up)
Nadir	Zurga

The duet starts in the key of E-flat major and the time signature of common time; after a general pause following the words "Elle fuit!", the score briefly omits all signature accidentals, and the time signature changes at "Non, que rien ne nous sépare" to 3/4 before returning to the starting configuration on "Oui, c'est elle" in the final duet. Nadir's part ranges from F_{3} to B♭_{4} with the tessitura between A_{3} and G_{4}. Zurga's part ranges from D_{3} to E♭_{4}. Depending on the version and on cuts to the recitatives within the aria, it takes between 4 1/2 and 6 minutes to perform.

== Lyrics ==
Zurga

C'était le soir !
Dans l'air par la brise attiédi,
Les brahmines au front inondé de lumière,
Appelaient lentement la foule à la prière !

It was in the evening!
In the air cooled by a breeze,
The brahmanes with faces flooded with light,
Slowly called the crowd to prayer!

Nadir

Au fond du temple saint
paré de fleurs et d'or,
Une femme apparaît !

At the back of the holy temple,
decorated with flowers and gold,
A woman appears!

Zurga

Une femme apparaît !

A woman appears!

Nadir

Je crois la voir encore !

I can still see her!

Zurga

Je crois la voir encore !

I can still see her!

Nadir

La foule prosternée
La regarde, étonnée,
Et murmure tout bas :
Voyez, c'est la déesse
Qui dans l'ombre se dresse,
Et vers nous tend les bras !

The prostrate crowd
looks at her amazed
and murmurs under its breath:
look, this is the goddess
looming up in the shadow
and holding out her arms to us.

Zurga

Son voile se soulève !
Ô vision ! ô rêve !
La foule est à genoux !

Her veil lifts slightly.
What a vision! What a dream!
The crowd is kneeling.

Both

Oui, c'est elle !
C'est la déesse
Plus charmante et plus belle !
Oui, c'est elle !
C'est la déesse
Qui descend parmi nous !
Son voile se soulève
Et la foule est à genoux !

Yes, it is she!
It is the goddess,
more charming and more beautiful.
Yes, it is she!
It is the goddess
who has come down among us.
Her veil has lifted
and the crowd is kneeling.

Nadir

Mais à travers la foule
Elle s'ouvre un passage !

But through the crowd
she makes her way.

Zurga

Son long voile déjà
Nous cache son visage !

Already her long veil
hides her face from us.

Nadir

Mon regard, hélas !
La cherche en vain !

My eyes, alas!
Seek her in vain!

Zurga

Elle fuit !

She flees!

Nadir

Elle fuit !
Mais dans mon âme soudain
Quelle étrange ardeur s'allume !

She flees!
But what is this strange flame
which is suddenly kindled in my soul!

Zurga

Quel feu nouveau me consume !

What unknown fire is destroying me?

Nadir

Ta main repousse ma main !

Your hand pushes mine away!

Zurga

Ta main repousse ma main !

Your hand pushes mine away!

Nadir

De nos cœurs l'amour s'empare,
Et nous change en ennemis !

Love takes our hearts by storm
and turns us into enemies!

Zurga

Non, que rien ne nous sépare !

No, let nothing part us!

Nadir

Non, rien !

No, nothing!

Zurga

Que rien ne nous sépare.

Let nothing part us!

Nadir

Non, rien !

No, nothing!

Zurga

Jurons de rester amis !

Let us swear to remain friends!

Nadir

Jurons de rester amis !

Let us swear to remain friends!

Zurga

Jurons de rester amis !

Let us swear to remain friends!

Both

Oh oui, jurons de rester amis !
Oui, c'est elle ! C'est la déesse !
En ce jour qui vient nous unir,
Et fidèle à ma promesse,
Comme un frère je veux te chérir !
C'est elle, c'est la déesse
Qui vient en ce jour nous unir !
Oui, partageons le même sort,
Soyons unis jusqu'à la mort !

Oh yes, let us swear to remain friends!
Yes, it is she, the goddess,
who comes to unite us this day.
And, faithful to my promise,
I wish to cherish you like a brother!
It is she, the goddess,
who comes to unite us this day!
Yes, let us share the same fate,
let us be united until death!
