= Spiegel im Spiegel =

1978 musical composition by Arvo Pärt

- Chamber music by Arvo Pärt
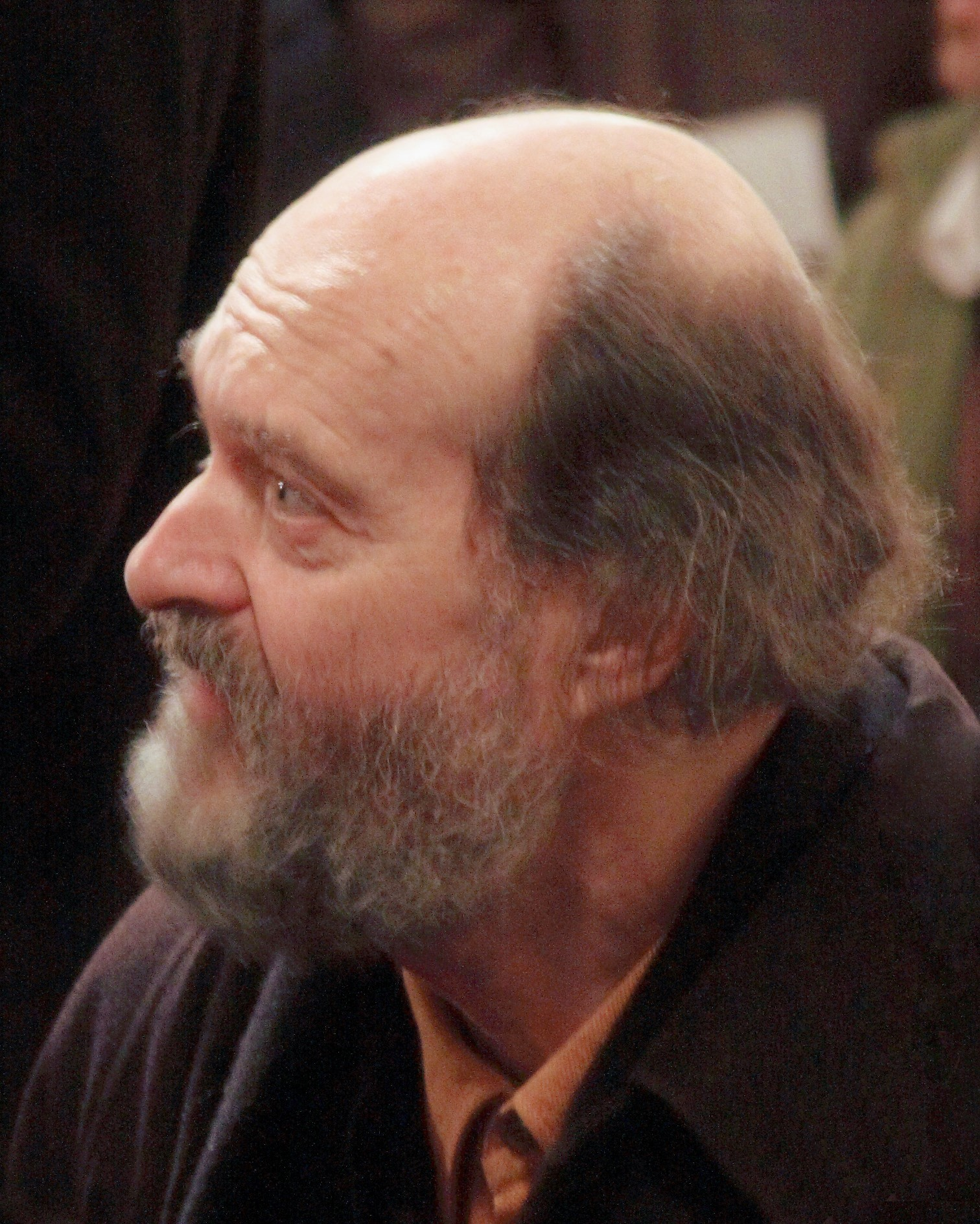
- Arvo Pärt in 2008
- Key: F major
- Composed: 1978
- Scoring: violin or other melody instrument; piano

Spiegel im Spiegel (German for 'mirror(s) in the mirror') is a composition by Arvo Pärt written in 1978, just before his departure from Estonia. The piece is in the tintinnabular style, in which a melodic voice (operating over diatonic scales) and a tintinnabular voice (operating within a triad on the tonic) accompany each other. The piece is about ten minutes long.

== Description ==
Pärt's first published musical compositions were complex and challenging, and lacked traditional melodies. During the 1970s, he wrote music that was minimalist and meditative in its style, Spiegel im Spiegel being an early example. Pärt coined the term tintinnabuli to describe the style of his compositions. Spiegel im Spiegel was written for piano and violin, though the violin can be replaced with a cello or a viola.

The piece is an example of minimal music. It was written in the scale of F major in 6/4 time. The piano plays a seemingly endless series of rising triads, as exemplified by the introductory first three bars:

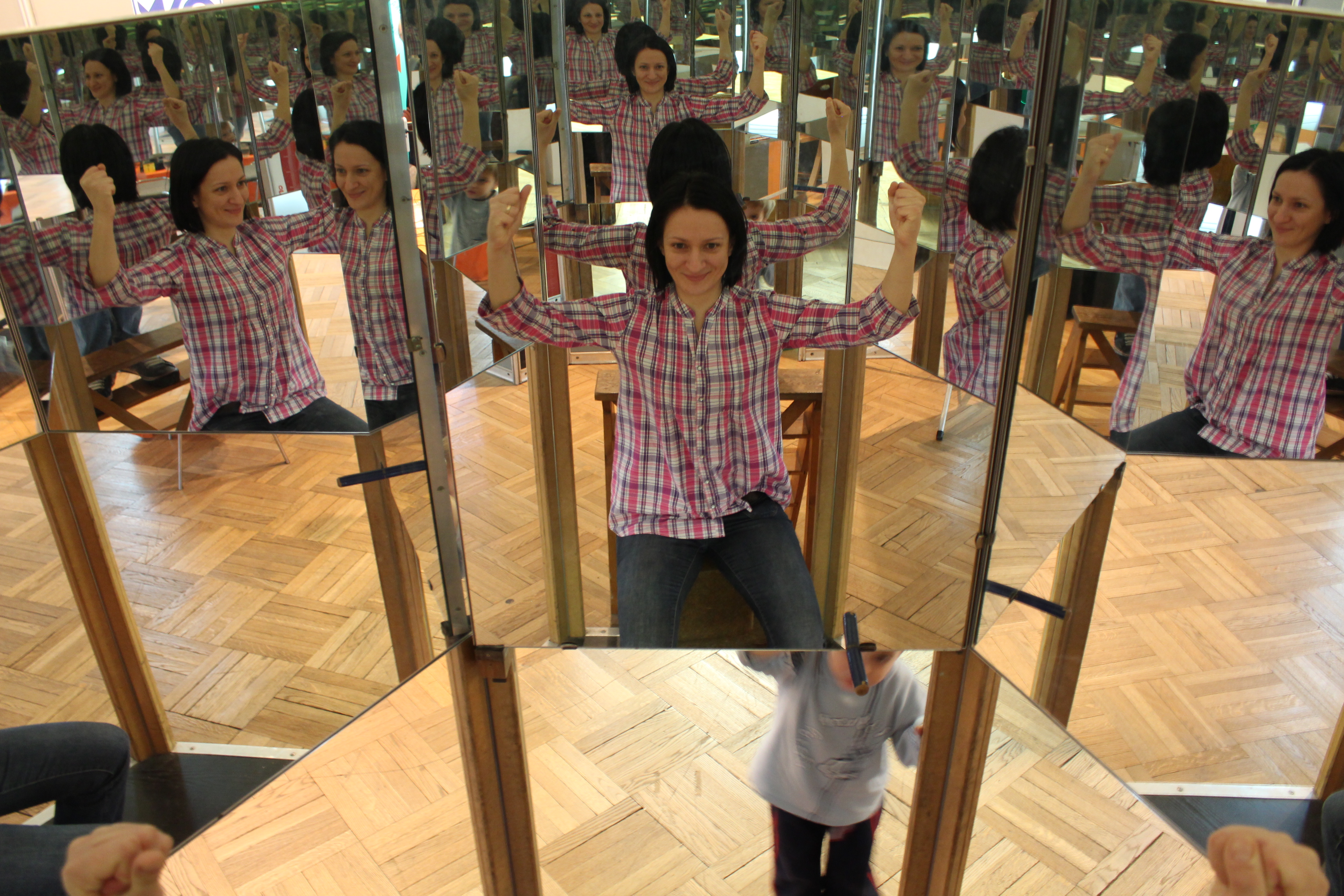
An infinity mirror on display at the National Museum of Technology, Warsaw. The title of the composition refers to an infinity mirror.

The violin melody consists of slow F major scales that rise or fall; they increase in length during the piece, all ending on the same note The alternation between ascending and descending phrases pivoted on the note A, along with the overturning of the final intervals between adjacent phrases (for example, ascending sixth in the question—descending sixth in the answer), contributes to give the impression of a figure reflecting on a mirror and walking back and towards it.

Initially, the melody consists of only two notes, with another note being added with each of the following phrases, thus creating a seemingly endless continuum. After each distancing, the melody returns to the central pitch of A, which, according to the composer, is like "returning home after being away". The piano part accompanies the melody part at each step like a "guardian angel", as the composer himself likes to say. In addition to the accompaniment, the piano part includes tintinnabuli notes—like little bells that alternately sound above and below the melodic line, following a fixed formula.

The German phrase Spiegel im Spiegel ('mirror in the mirror' or 'mirrors in the mirror') refers to an infinity mirror, which produces an infinity of images reflected by parallel plane mirrors. The title directly describes the music, as descending melodic line mirrors every ascending phrase.

== Performance ==
Spiegel im Spiegel received its premiere in December 1978 at the Moscow Conservatory with Vladimir Spivakov (to whom this composition was dedicated) as the soloist and Boris Bekhterev accompanying at the piano.

The composition poses a challenge to the soloist, as, according to Pärt, "Everything redundant must be left aside. Just like the composer has to reduce his ego when writing the music, the musician too must put his ego aside when performing the piece." Purity and innocence are the qualities valued by the composer in the performance of his music. According to the violinist Tasmin Little, the work is difficult for the soloist to perform because the mood it conveys can depend so much on how it is played.

== Adaptations ==
=== Film ===
Year	Type	Title	Director	reference
1996	film	Mother Night	Keith Gordon	
2001	film	In Praise of Love	Jean-Luc Godard	
2001	film	The Officers' Ward	François Dupeyron	
2001	film	Wit	Mike Nichols	
2002	film	Gerry	Gus Van Sant	
2002	short film	Dans le Noir du Temps	Jean-Luc Godard	
2002	film	Heaven	Tom Tykwer	
2002	film	Soldados de Salamina (Spain)	David Trueba	
2002	film	Swept Away	Guy Ritchie	
2002	film	On the Occasion of Remembering the Turning Gate	Hong Sang-soo	
2004	film	Dear Frankie	Shona Auerbach	
2004	mini-series	North & South	Brian Percival	
2005	film	Time to Leave	François Ozon	
2005	documentary	Auschwitz: The Nazis and 'The Final Solution'	Laurence Rees and Catherine Tatge	
2008	film	Elegy	Isabel Coixet	
2011	film	Burning Man	Jonathan Teplitzky	
2011	film	This Must Be the Place	Paolo Sorrentino	
2011	documentary	The Umbrella Man - New York Times Op-Docs	Errol Morris	
2012	film	The Letter	Jay Anania	
2012	trailer	Silent House		
2013	film	About Time	Richard Curtis	
2013	trailer	Gravity	Alfonso Cuarón	
2013	film	The East	Zal Batmanglij	
2013	film	Movie 43	Peter Farrelly and others	
2014	film	The Way He Looks	Daniel Ribeiro	
2015	film	Arabian Nights: Volume 1 - The Restless One	Miguel Gomes	
2017	film	Foxtrot	Samuel Maoz	
2021	film	You Won't Be Alone	Goran Stolevski	
2026	film	Pressure	Anthony Maras	

=== Dance ===
Year	Performance by	Country	Title	Choreographer
2009	Northern Ballet	UK	Dracula	David Nixon
2007	Pilobolus	US	Rushes	
2005			After the Rain	Christopher Wheeldon
1985			Othello	John Neumeier
1995	Sylvie Guillem and Niklas Ek		Smoke	Mats Ek
1998	Ballet Austin		Stephen Mills	

=== Theatre ===
Year	Location	Title	Playwright
2007	New York	Eurydice	Sarah Ruhl
2007	Venezuela	120 vidas x minuto ("120 Lives a Minute")	Gustavo Ott
	Czech Republic	Forgotten Light ("Zapomenuté světlo")	Jakub Deml
2016	France	The Glass Menagerie	Tennessee Williams
2012	St. Lawrence Shakespeare Festival, Canada	Othello	William Shakespeare

== Recordings ==
In 2011, Spiegel im Spiegel was the focus of a 30-minute BBC Radio 4 programme, Soul Music. During the programme, the violinist Tasmin Little discussed her relationship with the piece.

Year	Artists	Album	Label
1980	Gidon Kremer and Elena Kremer	Konzert nach dem Konzert	Eurodisc
1999		Alina	ECM New Series (Note: The album was recorded with the participation of Pärt. It includes three versions of Spiegel im Spiegel (two for violin and piano, and one for cello and piano). The tempo of the first version of Spiegel im Spiegel is 69 bpm and has a more sombre feel. The tempo of the second version is faster at 85 bpm and gives the sense of pushing forward. The tempo of the third version is faster than the first and slower than the second at 78 bpm.)
2016	Niki Vasilakis and Deanna Djuric	Sacred	
2009	Nicola Benedetti	Fantasie	

== Sources ==
- Hillier, Paul (1997). Arvo Pärt. Clarendon Press. ISBN 9780191590481.
