= Liebestod =

Musical composition by Richard Wagner

Liebestod motif

"Liebestod" ([ˈliːbəsˌtoːt] German for 'love death') is the title often given to the final, dramatic music or aria from the opera Tristan und Isolde by Richard Wagner. It is the climactic end of the 1859-completed, 1865- premiered opera. In the scene, titular character Isolde sings into her death after encountering her lover Tristan's dead body, her material surroundings fading out as she envisions him alive once again.

Wagner initially titled the prelude "Liebestod" (Love-death) while he entitled the final piece "Verklärung" (Transfiguration). The confusion in title comes from an 1867 transcription his father-in-law Franz Liszt made which he called "Liebestod" (S.447); he prefaced his score with a four-bar motto from the love duet from Act II, which in the opera is sung to the words "sehnend verlangter Liebestod". Liszt's transcription became well known throughout Europe well before Wagner's opera reached most places, and it is Liszt's title for the final scene that persists. The transcription was revised in 1875.

The music is often used in film and television productions of doomed lovers.

== Partial text ==
Mild und leise
wie er lächelt,
wie das Auge
hold er öffnet
—seht ihr's, Freunde?
Seht ihr's nicht?
Immer lichter
wie er leuchtet,
stern-umstrahlet
hoch sich hebt?
Seht ihr's nicht?

ertrinken,
versinken, –
unbewusst, –
höchste Lust!

Softly and gently
how he smiles,
how his eyes
fondly open
—do you see, friends?
do you not see?
ever brighter
how he shines,
Star-haloed
rising higher
Do you not see?

[...and ends...]

to drown,
to founder –
unconscious –
utmost bliss!
