= ABC Classic =

Australian classical music radio station

- Australia
- Frequencies: FM: Various; DVB-T: Ch. 27; DAB+; online

Programming
- Format: Classical music
- Network: ABC Radio

Ownership
- Owner: Australian Broadcasting Corporation
- Sister stations: ABC Classic 2

History
- First air date: 24 January 1976; 50 years ago
- Former names: ABC-FM (1976–1994); ABC Classic FM (1994–2018)

Technical information
- Licensing authority: Australian Communications and Media Authority

Links
- Webcast: Live stream
- Website: abc.net.au/classic

ABC Classic, formerly ABC-FM (also ABC Fine Music), and then ABC Classic FM, is an Australian classical music radio station available in Australia and internationally. Its website features classical music news, features and listening guides. ABC Classic also produces podcasts, live events and educational resources and has a record label. It is operated by the Australian Broadcasting Corporation (ABC).

== History ==
ABC Classic was established in 1976 as "ABC-FM", and later for a short time was known as "ABC Fine Music" (a play on the letters FM). It became known as ABC Classic FM in 1994, before adopting its current name in January 2019. It was the ABC's first experiment in FM broadcasting – which had become a necessity in Australia as broadcasters ran out of AM frequencies on which to transmit. This was before most commercial stations had started using FM, and the ABC was first to use satellite transmissions. The creation of ABC Classic FM was inspired partly by the example of BBC Radio 3, and its focus was on fine music and the arts.

ABC Classic FM's studios were established at the ABC studios in Collinswood, a suburb of Adelaide, South Australia. The ABC's decision to establish ABC Classic FM in Adelaide was significant because most of the ABC's radio and television national program original infrastructure was and is located in Sydney. However, staffing has been progressively cut over the years, from the starting base of 60 down to just five by 2015, a particularly savage round of cuts which included the loss of popular presenter Julia Lester when her job moved to the Sydney studios.

=== 2019 rebrand ===
On 24 November 2018, the ABC announced that ABC Classic FM would undergo a major rebrand in 2019, and change its name to ABC Classic. Their stated purpose for the rebrand was to reflect the "diverse ways that Australians now experience our programs, playlists and articles".

== Programming ==
ABC Classic broadcasts classical music, operas, recitals and live concerts. Former "Classic Breakfast" producer Greg Keane has been critical of changes that were made to programming methods in 2016. He says that the use of G-Selector software has led to a "loss of thoughtful, varied and original programming devised by experienced producers". Around half of the music played is performed by Australian musicians, and the ABC Young Performers Awards are a way of supporting a younger generation of musicians. In 2015, ABC Classic set a goal for 5% of composers featured on air to be women.

Live music is an important feature of the programming, and past concerts are available online afterwards. However, due to budget cuts, this has reduced over time.

=== Events ===
A number of special events are held throughout the year, including:

==== Classic 100 Countdowns ====
Since 2001, ABC Classic FM has organised a number of Classic 100 Countdown surveys. The results of each survey are decided by votes cast by the listeners of the radio station. The works are broadcast in reverse order of popularity over three days. The countdown culminates in the broadcast of a live concert featuring the most popular pieces and finishes with the number one listener choice. A feature of the countdown is that each piece is kept secret until just before its broadcast (including the pieces featured in the final concert).

Classic 100 themes have included Love, Beethoven, Music in the Movies, Composers, and Dance.

==== AusMusic Month ====
Each November on ABC Classic is AusMusic Month, where Australian artists are heavily promoted. This includes more Australian composition broadcast every day; some free, limited-entry concerts around the country; all-Australian albums of the week; and many live Australian concerts.

==== Women of Note ====
Coinciding with International Women's Day on the 8th March, the ABC Classic record label releases an album each year that they describe as an "annual celebration of Australia’s female composers". In 2019, the first album was released in CD format. In 2025, the seventh volume of Women of Note was released as a digital album.

=== News ===
In common with all ABC Radio stations (other than Triple J, which operates its own service), it also carries news bulletins produced by ABC News. On 19 December 2005, in line with the policy applied at every ABC Radio network (except Triple J and Radio Australia), these news bulletins became state-based rather than national.

== FM broadcast frequencies ==
ABC Classic is broadcast in stereo FM across Australia on over more than 30 frequencies. Broadcast frequencies of the major Australian capital cities are listed below.

- 92.9 FM - Sydney, New South Wales
- 93.9 FM - Hobart, Tasmania
- 97.7 FM - Perth, Western Australia
- 102.3 FM - Canberra, Australian Capital Territory (alternative: 99.1 FM - Tuggeranong, ACT)
- 103.9 FM - Adelaide, South Australia (alternative: 97.5 FM - Adelaide Foothills, SA)
- 105.9 FM - Melbourne, Victoria
- 106.1 FM - Brisbane, Queensland
- 107.3 FM - Darwin, Northern Territory

== ABC Classic 2 ==
ABC Classic 2, an internet radio station managed and programmed by ABC Classic staff, is available through the ABC listen service. It specialises in popular styles of classical music, performed exclusively by leading Australian orchestras, ensembles and soloists. No opera or vocal works are included in the playlist. During daytime and evenings, Classic 2 typically broadcasts short excerpts from the classical repertoire, such as single movements from full symphonies. Longer works are broadcast overnight from midnight to 6 a.m., and Classic 2 programming is also broadcast as ABC Classic's overnight program. ABC Classic 2 began broadcasting on 1 June 2014, and was opened with Nigel Westlake's Penguin Ballet from his Antarctica Suite, performed by the Tasmanian Symphony Orchestra and Timothy Kain.

== Limelight magazine ==
The monthly arts magazine Limelight was, under its former name ABC Radio 24 Hours (1976–2003), originally owned and published by the ABC. It is now independently owned and published, but continues a strong, albeit unofficial, affiliation with the ABC and with ABC Classic in particular.

== See also ==
- Australian Broadcasting Corporation
- Symphony Australia
- BBC Radio 3
