= Butterfly Dreams (Tavener) =

- Songs for a butterfly
- by John Tavener
- Language: English
- Dedication: Alan Barrett and William Two-Feather
- Performed: May 13, 2003 - Hove, UK
- Published: 2003 - Brighton
- Publisher: Chester Music
- Duration: 11 minutes
- Movements: 8
- Scoring: Mixed chorus

Butterfly Dreams is a choral composition by British composer John Tavener.

== Composition ==
Butterfly Dreams was commissioned by the Brighton Chamber Choir at the request of Alan Barrett, who had curated a selection of texts by various authors, inspired by his personal collection of butterfly photographs. Tavener, whose oeuvre predominantly comprises religious works, regarded Butterfly Dreams as a sacred composition rather than a secular one. The piece premiered on May 11, 2003, with the Brighton Chamber Choir performing under the direction of Paul Brough at The Old Market, Hove, located in Sussex, England. The composition was dedicated to two different people: Alan Barrett, who served as the inspiration for the work, organized the commission and provided the texts, and William Two-Feather, a medicine man from an Apache Indian tribe, who had brought the composer a traditional drum as a present. The composition was later published by Chester Music.

== Structure ==
Butterfly Dreams is a choral composition by John Tavener, structured in eight movements, with a total performance time of approximately 11 minutes. The movements are as follows:

1. Butterfly Dreams based on Chuang Tse
2. Haiku by Kokku
3. Haiku by Buson
4. Haiku by Issa
5. Haiku, anon
6. The Butterfly by Pavel Friedmann
7. Butterfly Song from Acoman Indian
8. Butterfly Dreams based on Chuang Tse

The work is scored for a mixed SSSSAAATTTBBB choir. The texts are drawn from a diverse range of sources, attributed to various authors. The first and last movements are based on texts by the ancient Chinese philosopher Chuang Tse; the second movement features a poem by an anonymous author referred to as "Kokku"; the third movement is set to a text by the Japanese haiku poet Yosa Buson; the fourth to a poem by Kobayashi Issa, another renowned Japanese haiku poet. The fifth movement is based on an anonymous poem.

The sixth movement is the longest and most complex in the cycle, featuring a poem by Czech poet Pavel Friedmann, written in 1942. Friedmann, who was murdered in the Holocaust, wrote the poem shortly before his death. It was later compiled by Jeanne Němcová under the title "The Butterfly" and published in the anthology I Never Saw Another Butterfly, which contains poems and drawings by children from the Theresienstadt concentration camp. The version of the poem used in this movement was translated by Dennis Silk. Finally, the seventh movement features a poem originally written in the Keres language, spoken by the Acoma Pueblo people, and translated by ethnologist Frances Densmore.

== Recordings ==
The following is a partial list of recordings of Butterfly Dreams:

- The world premiere recording of Butterfly Dreams was performed by Polyphony, conducted by Stephen Layton, recorded at the Temple Church, in London, England, on January 5, 2004. The recording was released that same year by Hyperion Records on CD.
- The Skylark Vocal Ensemble also recorded the piece with conductor Matthew Guard. The recording was released as a digital download album by Sono Luminus in January 2016.
