= Anna Reynolds (singer) =

English classical mezzo-soprano and contralto singer

- Born: Vera Ann Reynolds; 5 June 1930; Canterbury, Kent, England, UK
- Died: 24 February 2014 (aged 83); Peesten, Germany
- Occupation(s): mezzo-soprano and contralto singer
- Spouse: Jean Cox

Anna Reynolds (5 June 1930 – 24 February 2014) was an English classical mezzo-soprano and contralto singer in opera and concert.

== Professional career ==
Ann Reynolds was born in Canterbury. She first studied piano, then voice at the Royal Academy of Music. She continued her voice studies with Debora Fambri and Re Koster in Rome, where she adopted Anna as her stage name. Jean Cox, an American-born tenor best known for his Wagner performances, was her husband.

Reynolds made her operatic debut in 1960 in Parma as Suzuki in Puccini's Madama Butterfly. Her debut in England was in 1962 as Geneviève in Debussy's Pelléas et Mélisande at Glyndebourne, and she also sang there the roles of Ortensia (La pietra del paragone, 1964) and Annina (Der Rosenkavalier, 1965).

In 1963 she performed the part of the Angel in Edward Elgar's The Dream of Gerontius in London, conducted by Sir John Barbirolli. Her first appearance at Covent Garden in London was in 1967, Adelaide in Richard Strauss's Arabella, and returned in 1975 for Andromache in Michael Tippett's King Priam.

Reynolds first sang at the Metropolitan Opera in 1968–69, as Flosshilde in Wagner's Das Rheingold, and she returned in the 1975 Ring cycle as Fricka in Das Rheingold and Die Walküre, and Waltraute and the Second Norn in Götterdämmerung. At the Bayreuth Festival, she first appeared in 1970 as Fricka and sang regularly through 1976. Also in 1970 she first performed at the Salzburg Festival in the Ring cycle, conducted by Herbert von Karajan.

Reynolds recorded in 1958 Bach's Magnificat and Actus Tragicus with Hermann Scherchen conducting Orchestra Sinfonica e Coro di Milano della RAI. With Lorin Maazel conducting the RIAS-Kammerchor and the Berlin Radio-Symphonie Orchester, she recorded in 1965 Bach's Mass in B minor with Teresa Stich-Randall, Ernst Haefliger and John Shirley-Quirk, and in 1966 Bach's Easter Oratorio with Helen Donath, Haefliger and Martti Talvela. She recorded several Bach cantatas with Karl Richter, the Münchener Bach-Chor and the Münchener Bach-Orchester, including, in 1972, Jesus schläft, was soll ich hoffen? BWV 81, with Peter Schreier and Theo Adam.

She participated in Leonard Bernstein's renditions of Gustav Mahler's symphonies, his Das Lied von der Erde and other Lieder. She premiered John Tavener's dramatic cantata The Whale at a Proms concert on 1 August 1969, conducted by David Atherton. Also appearing was barritone Raimund Herincx, narrator Alvar Lidell, and the composer playing pipe and hammond organs. She also participated on the recording of this piece for Apple Records in 1970.

She died in Peesten, Germany on 24 February 2014, aged 83, from undisclosed causes.
