= Birthday Sleep =

Choral composition by John Tavener

Birthday Sleep a meditation on the Incarnation
- by John Tavener
- Composed: 1999
- Performed: December 2000: Edinburgh
- Scoring: SATB choir

Birthday Sleep is a choral composition by British composer John Tavener. It was completed in 1999 and was destined to be first performed to mark the millennium.

== Background ==
The piece was commissioned by George Watson's College, a private educational institution based in Edinburgh, to be performed to celebrate the new millennium. Subtitled "a meditation on the Incarnation" and set to a text by Welsh poet Vernon Watkins, it explores the topics of spirituality and mysticism drawn from Orthodox Christianity, of which Tavener was a devout follower. The piece was premiered at the Festival of Nine Lessons and Carols, held in St. Giles' Cathedral on December 19, 2000. It was then published by Chester Music.

== Structure ==
The piece is scored for a mixed SATB choir, with an elaborate vocal arrangement consisting of two distinct sets of sopranos, three altos, three tenors, and three basses, which give the piece a rich and textured harmony. It has an approximate duration of 11 minutes, even though most recordings are around 5 or 6 minutes long.

Birthday Sleep consists of three verses, all of them set to the same melody and harmonic progression with little modifications. Beginning in B minor, the piece follows the same modulation patterns, all finishing in the key of F major. The episodic and fragmentary aspect of the piece, as well as the transition and the relationship between those two keys reflect the revelation of the mystery of God, as expressed by Tavener.

== Recordings ==
Although not as well known as other Tavener pieces like Song of Athene or The Lamb, Birthday Sleep has been performed and recorded a few times since its premiere. The following is a short list of some of the most famous recordings of the piece:

- The world premiere recording of Birthday Sleep was performed by Polyphony, conducted by Stephen Layton, recorded at the Temple Church, in London, England, on January 5, 2004. The recording was released that same year by Hyperion Records on CD.
- The Choir of Clare College, Cambridge conducted by Timothy Brown also recorded the piece on July 8, 2008, in Norwich Cathedral, in Norwich, England. The recording was released in November 2008 by Naxos Records on CD.
