= A Celtic Requiem =

Choral work by John Tavener

Studio album by John Tavener
- Released: 14 May 1971
- Recorded: 1970
- Genre: Classical
- Length: 41:57
- Label: Apple
- Producer: Michael Bremner

John Tavener chronology
The Whale (1970)	'''A Celtic Requiem''' (1971)

A Celtic Requiem (Requiem for Jenny Jones) is a requiem by the English composer John Tavener, written in 1969. It is written for soprano, children's choir and orchestra.

Despite its title, the work is not actually a requiem for anyone in particular. Instead, it takes the rough format of a singing game for children. A character, Jenny Jones, is selected by the children who at one point dance around her to ward off evil spirits. According to the composer, this

though handed down to children, has its origin in a funeral rite in the lowlands of Scotland.

The piece is composed in three sections which follow the traditional requiem: 'Requiem aeternam', 'Dies irae' and 'Requiescat in pace'.

It was premiered by the London Sinfonietta and chorus under David Atherton in August 1969. Shortly afterward the BBC recorded it with the soprano June Barton and the children of Little Missenden Village School and the composer playing the organ. These forces then recorded the work for Apple Records along with two other Tavener pieces: Nomine Jesu and Coplas. The recording was released in 1970, and re-released as a CD (on SAPCOR 20) in 1993.
