= Martin Neary =

English organist and choral conductor (1940–2025)

Martin Neary LVO
- Neary c. 2005
- Born: 28 March 1940; London, England
- Died: 27 September 2025 (aged 85)
- Education: Cambridge University
- Occupation: Organist and choral conductor
- Organizations: Winchester Cathedral; Westminster Abbey

Martin Gerard James Neary LVO (28 March 1940 – 27 September 2025) was an English organist and choral conductor. He was master of music at Winchester Cathedral from 1972 to 1988, and organist and master of the choristers at Westminster Abbey from 1988 to 1998. He commissioned new works from composers including Jonathan Harvey and John Tavener. In 1997 he was music director of the funeral service for Princess Diana.

== Life and career ==
Neary was born in London on 28 March 1940. He was a chorister of the Chapel Royal at St James's Palace from age eight, singing at the baptism of Charles III in 1948 and the televised coronation of Elizabeth II in 1953 at the age of 13. He attended the City of London School. He went on to read first theology and then music at Cambridge University, where he was organ scholar at Gonville and Caius College. After he initially considered studying to enter the Anglican ministry, he decided to pursue music, feeling that it "provided ... a means of expression, with a power beyond that of words".

Neary became assistant organist of St Margaret's, Westminster, in 1963 and succeeded Herbert Dawson as organist there in 1965, serving until 1971. During this period he had other engagements such as conducting the Twickenham Musical Society and playing recitals at the Royal Festival Hall.

=== Winchester Cathedral ===
Neary was organist and director of music at Winchester Cathedral from 1972 to 1988. He focused on the services including daily evensong. The cathedral choir also performed on tours, such as participating in the 1985 premiere of Andrew Lloyd Webber's Requiem together with the choir of St Thomas in Manhattan. On the occasion of the cathedral's 900th anniversary in 1979, they toured to Canada, the US, and to the Channel Islands which then belonged to the diocese. In addition to extending the traditional choral repertoire, Neary commissioned works from composers including Jonathan Harvey and, in particular, John Tavener. The premiere of Harvey’s Passion and Resurrection took place in 1981. With his assistant organists, James Lancelot and Timothy Byram-Wigfield, he was responsible for planning of the major rebuilding and enlargement of the cathedral organ by Harrison and Harrison in 1986–88. In 1984 Neary was artist-in-residence at the University of California at Davis.

=== Westminster Abbey ===
Neary was organist and master of the choristers at Westminster Abbey from 1988 to 1998. Overseas tours were made with the Westminster choir and, in addition to his own organ recitals at the cathedral, he drew organists from across the world to play there, including Daniel Chorzempa, Daniel Hathaway and Marilyn Keiser from the United States, Raymond Daveluy from Montreal, Peter Planyavsky from Vienna, and Ralph Downes, among others from the United Kingdom. As the organist at Westminster Abbey, he held a concert to honour Henry Purcell on the occasion of his tercentenary in 1995, broadcast live by BBC. He was the musical director of the funeral service for Princess Diana in 1997. In accordance with Neary's promotion of the music of Tavener, the latter's "Song for Athene" was performed by the choir of the abbey as the coffin was borne out by the pallbearers. In the 1998 New Year Honours, he was appointed a Lieutenant of the Royal Victorian Order (LVO) "for services in connection with the funeral of the late Diana, Princess of Wales".

On 22 April 1998, Wesley Carr, the Dean of Westminster Abbey, dismissed Neary from his position on the grounds of alleged gross misconduct regarding the finances of a company that he and his wife had set up to administer fees from concerts at the abbey. Neary petitioned Queen Elizabeth II, as visitor of the abbey, to resolve the dispute. The Queen appointed Charles Jauncey, Baron Jauncey of Tullichettle, to be her commissioner. After a 12-day hearing, Lord Jauncey determined that the decision to dismiss the organist and his wife "must score gamma minus on the scale of natural justice", but upheld the previous verdict. The report also stated that Neary's musical abilities, and the hard work that he and his wife had done on behalf of the abbey and the choir, were not in question.

=== Later years ===
Neary was the first conductor of the Millennium Youth Choir of the Royal School of Church Music. From 1992 to 2024, Neary was chairman of the Herbert Howells Society. He became organist of St Michael and All Angels Church, Barnes, where he raised the quality of the choir to a level to perform Bach's St John Passion. He retired due to Parkinson's disease.

=== Personal life ===
Neary was married to Penny née Warren, the daughter of Dame Josephine Barnes and Sir Brian Warren. Their wedding was at St Margaret's in 1967. They had three children, Nicola, a hospital consultant, Alice, who became principal cellist of the BBC National Orchestra of Wales, and Thomas, who began living in care homes at the age of eight due to being severely autistic.

Neary died from complications of Parkinson's disease on 27 September 2025, at the age of 85.

Cultural offices
Preceded by Reginald Alwyn Surplice	Organist and Master of the Music Winchester Cathedral; 1972–1988	Succeeded by David Hill
Preceded by Simon Preston	Organist and Master of the Choristers of Westminster Abbey; 1988–1998	Succeeded by Martin Baker
