= Brighton Chamber Choir =

- Choir
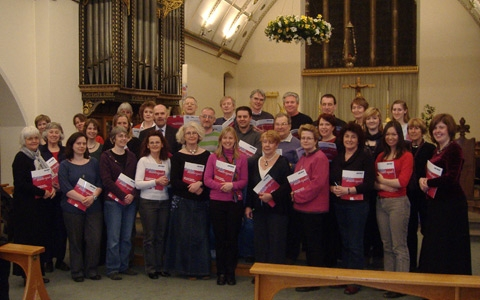
- A break in the regular Wednesday rehearsal
- Origin: Brighton
- Founded: November 1990
- Genre: Choral music, sacred and secular
- Members: 35–40
- Music director: Ruth Kerr
- Website: www.brightonchamberchoir.org.uk/

Brighton Chamber Choir is a Brighton-based choir of around 45 SATB voices singing a wide range of sacred and secular works from Gregorian chant to Broadway musicals. The choir has charitable status. and is a member of Making Music, formerly the National Federation of Music Societies

== History ==
In 1990 Brighton Chamber Choir was founded by Guy Richardson who also directed the Brighton Youth Choir. Originally Brighton Chamber Choir sang alongside the Brighton Youth Choir, and it was not until 1991 that Brighton Chamber Choir gave its first solo performance.

From 1995 until 2001, renowned tenor, Neil Jenkins assumed the mantle of music director and reinforced the choir's aim "to develop, improve and promote choral music to the widest possible audience".

Paul Brough took up the baton from 2001 until 2004 and under Brough's guidance, the choir commissioned and gave the first performance of Sir John Tavener's Butterfly Dreams

For a short time Christopher Larley followed Paul Brough as music director and Jane Money held the post from 2005 to 2019.

Ruth Kerr is the current music director, and Claire Williams is the choir accompanist.

Sir Simon Rattle is president of the choir. Choir chairman is Jo Oldham.

== Repertoire and highlights ==
Brighton Chamber Choir performs both unaccompanied and with organ, piano or chamber orchestra. Their repertoire of sacred and secular music ranges from the Renaissance to present day.

Brighton Chamber Choir has performed live on Classic FM and each May takes part in the Brighton Festival Fringe and the Clifton, Montpelier, Powis Festival (CMP).

The choir also has performed at the Brighton Early Music Festival at Danny House, Hurstpierpoint, at Nymans Gardens for the National Trust and in the Royal Pavilion, Brighton for the Lord Mayor's Music Evening.

In 2010 the choir gave another first performance – Requiem, by composer A T Nail, and in 2011 Requiem was recorded professionally by the choir.

Brighton Chamber Choir celebrated its twentieth anniversary in 2010 with a performance of Bach's Mass in B Minor at St Michael and All Angels Church, Brighton with London's Linden Baroque Orchestra.

The choir has given support to charities, notably The Martlets Hospice, Diabetes UK and St Dunstans.

== Premieres ==
- 1997 Neil Jenkins' new editions of the Schütz Christmas Story and Resurrection Story.
- 2004 Sir John Tavener's Butterfly Dreams.
- 2010 Requiem, composer A T Nail
- 2010 Guy Richardson's setting of There Be None of Beauty's Daughters (Lord Byron)

== Concert venues ==
Brighton Chamber Choir performs regularly at the following venues:

- St Bartholomew's Church, Brighton
- Brighton Friends Meeting House
- Church of the Good Shepherd, Brighton
- Church of the Sacred Heart, Hove
- Church of St Michael and All Angels, Brighton
- St Nicholas' Church, Brighton
- St Paul's Church, Brighton
- St Margaret's Church, Rottingdean

== Funding and administration ==
Brighton Chamber Choir is a not-for-profit organisation with charitable status. Choir funding has two main sources, members' subscriptions (payable quarterly) and ticket revenue from choir concerts.

In accordance with the Brighton Chamber Choir constitution, management of the choir is undertaken by an executive committee of six choir members. The officers and committee members are elected by and out of the choir members each year at the Annual General Meeting. No person to whom the choir pays fees is eligible to serve on the committee.
