= The Whale (Tavener) =

Studio album by John Tavener
- Released: 25 September 1970 (UK); 15 November 1970 (US)
- Recorded: 1970
- Genre: Classical
- Length: 31:41
- Label: Apple
- Producer: Michael Bremner

John Tavener chronology
'''The Whale''' (1970)	Celtic Requiem (1971)

The Whale is a "dramatic cantata" written by the English composer John Tavener in 1966.

== Composition ==
The work is loosely based on the biblical allegory of Jonah and the Whale, although Tavener admitted that "The 'fantasy' grew and perhaps at times nearly 'swallowed' the biblical text: so the swallowing of Jonah became almost 'literal' in the biblical sense."

The libretto includes the words of an encyclopaedia entry describing certain facts about the whale, and this is contrasted with themes within the music which attempt to portray the reality of the whale itself, whose existence is greater than the sum of all the facts about it.

The Whale has eight sections:

1. Documentary
2. Melodrama and Pantomime
3. Invocation
4. The Storm
5. The Swallowing
6. The Prayer
7. In the Belly
8. The Vomiting

== Release ==
It was premiered at the inaugural concert of the London Sinfonietta under David Atherton at the Queen Elizabeth Hall on 24 January 1968. It was heard again at a Proms concert on 1 August 1969, with the same orchestra and conductor, with vocal soloists Anna Reynolds and Raimund Herincx. Also featured were Alvar Lidell as narrator, and the composer playing pipe and hammond organs. In July 1970, The Whale was recorded in Islington, London with the same musicians. It was released as an album by The Beatles' Apple Records label later that year.

== Re-release ==
The Apple recording was re-released on record in 1977 on Ringo Starr's label, Ring O' Records, with a different cover. In 1992 a CD version was released by Apple with the original cover art and libretto. In 2010 the album was once again reissued on Apple Records CD, paired with Celtic Requiem.
