= Alvar Lidell =

English radio presenter (1908–1981)

Alvar Lidell MBE
- Born: Tord Alvar Quan Lidell; 11 September 1908; Wimbledon Park, Surrey, England
- Died: 7 January 1981 (aged 72); Northwood, London, England
- Education: King's College School, Wimbledon
- Alma mater: Exeter College, Oxford
- Occupations: Radio announcer, newsreader
- Notable credit: BBC News
- Spouse: Nancy Corfield (m. 1938)
- Children: 3

Tord Alvar Quan Lidell MBE (11 September 1908 – 7 January 1981) was an English radio announcer and newsreader for the BBC and compere. He joined BBC Birmingham as chief announcer in 1932 before moving to London the following year. Lidell was made deputy chief announcer of the BBC in 1937 and announced important events such as Edward VIII's abdication and Britain's declaration of war with Germany in 1939.

During the Second World War his distinctive voice became synonymous with the reading of the news. Lidell left the BBC for one year for service in the Royal Air Force and became chief announcer of the BBC Third Programme in 1946. He began reading news bulletins regularly on the BBC Home Service and the Light Programme from 1951 to his retirement in 1969. Lidell was appointed a Member of the Most Excellent Order of the British Empire (MBE) in 1964.

== Early life ==
Lidell was born on 11 September 1908 in Wimbledon Park, Surrey, the third child and younger son of Swedish parents. His father, John Adrian Lidell, was a timber importer who came to Britain in the 1890s. His mother was Gertrud Lidell (née Lundström). Lidell was christened Tord Alvar Quan. He attended King's College School, Wimbledon, playing rugby and cricket. He enrolled at Exeter College, Oxford, where he graduated with a second class degree in classical honour moderations in 1929, and also read French. As a boy, he studied piano, piccolo, cello and singing and was a noted actor at Oxford, performing these musical instruments in amateur orchestras. Lidell selected his second birth name Alvar for his professional career as it was easier for British listeners to understand.

== BBC ==
Following some brief teaching and singing jobs working with a puppet theatre company, he left Oxford in 1930 and spent all of 1931 seeking employment in acting but his tall height made it difficult for acting companies who had taken him on to fit him in a costume. Lidell joined BBC Birmingham in 1932 as chief announcer, before he was moved to London in September 1933. He became deputy chief announcer in 1937, and made some historic broadcasts, including the announcement of Edward VIII's abdication in 1936 as he was the only person in the newsroom. On 3 September 1939 he read the ultimatum to Germany from 10 Downing Street and then, at 11 a.m. introduced Prime Minister Neville Chamberlain who told the nation that it was at war with Germany.

It was during the Second World War that the BBC allowed its previously anonymous announcers and newsreaders to give their names – to distinguish them from enemy propagandists. During the war, he was part of a team of newsreaders employed by the War Office, and became the first announcer to identify himself by name via radio. "Here is the news, and this is Alvar Lidell reading it" became an inadvertent catchphrase of his. Lidell broadcast from a sub-basement 30 ft (9.1 m) below Broadcasting House, and survived a bombing close to the studio at Portman Place. Announcing the British victory at the Second Battle of El Alamein, he said "Here is the news, and cracking good news it is too!" He read his final radio news bulletin on 13 February 1943 before he was mobilised in the Armed Forces.

On 3 March 1943 he reported for duty with the Royal Air Force in North London as an intelligence officer (some of the time at Bletchley Park,) but returned to the BBC on 28 February 1944. In September 1946, he was appointed chief announcer on the new BBC Third Programme, where he remained for six years. Lidell became a regular reader of news bulletins for the BBC Home Service and the Light Programme on 5 February 1951. In 1952 the BBC's news service was reorganised, and he returned as a newsreader, also doing some television work, such as the 1953 BBC Proms. In protest against the "decline in BBC speech", he retired on 11 April 1969 after reading the Nine O'Clock News on BBC Radio 4. In May 1969 Lidell appeared on Desert Island Discs. His chosen book was the Oxford English Dictionary and his luxury item was playing-cards.

In 1970 Lidell was heard as narrator on the Apple Records recording of The Whale by composer John Tavener. In 1979 he published an article about the deteriorating standards of spoken speech at the BBC in The Listener – the BBC responded by establishing a panel of experts to report on the matter. Lidell also worked as a narrator, recording more than 237 volumes for Books for the Blind, including long works such as Anna Karenina as well as Arnold Schoenberg's Gurrelieder and A Survivor from Warsaw, as well as Ralph Vaughan Williams' An Oxford Elegy and William Walton's Façade. As a baritone, he gave recitals during and following the Second World War and recorded with Gerald Moore at the piano. He recorded two discs worth of ballads for His Master's Voice and studied under Julian KimbalI.

Recordings of Lidell's news bulletins have been included in many films set in Britain during the Second World War, such as the 1969 film Battle of Britain. His voice was regularly heard in the television series A Family at War and All Our Yesterdays. Lidell recorded lines introducing various reports on how Europe fared during the Second World War for the seven-part International Assignment radio series broadcast on BBC Radio 4 from November 1978. In 1980, he did some broadcasting for BBC Radio London. Lidell did not write news bulletins but rather read them.

== Personal life ==
He married Nancy Margaret Corfield, the daughter of a lawyer, at Chelsea Old Church on 1 October 1938. They had three children. Lidell was appointed Member of the Most Excellent Order of the British Empire (MBE) in the 1964 Birthday Honours. He died of cancer eighteen months after its diagnosis at Michael Sobell House, Mount Vernon Hospital in Northwood on 7 January 1981. Lidell left £17,448 net (£17,977 gross) in his will and his wife was given probate.
