= In Alium =

In Alium is a 1968 work by British composer John Tavener. It is scored for soprano, orchestra and tape. It was commissioned by then BBC Director of Music William Glock for performance at The Proms. The tape recordings in the work include the sound of children at play and saying prayers.
