= The Protecting Veil =

Musical composition by John Tavener

The Protecting Veil is a late 20th-century classical composition for cello and strings by British composer John Tavener. It was shortlisted for the 1992 Mercury Prize.

== Composition history ==
Completed in 1988, the work was begun in response to a request from cellist Steven Isserlis for a short (10-minute) piece. It soon developed into a more substantial work, and was subsequently commissioned by the BBC for the 1989 Proms season. Like many of Tavener's compositions, this work reflects the composer's Orthodox religious faith. The inspiration for the piece comes from the Orthodox feast of the Protecting Veil of the Mother of God, which commemorates the apparition of Mary the Theotokos in the early 10th century at the Blachernae Palace church in Constantinople.

The premiere took place at the Proms in the Royal Albert Hall on 4 September 1989, with soloist Steven Isserlis and the BBC Symphony Orchestra, conducted by Oliver Knussen.

It was shortlisted for the 1992 Mercury Prize, one of only a tiny handful of classical pieces nominated, in the award’s inaugural year.

== Structure ==
The composition, which has a performance time of approximately 45 minutes, is divided into eight sections, each of which is based on an icon in the life of the Virgin Mary:

1. The Protecting Veil
2. The Nativity of the Mother of God
3. The Annunciation
4. The Incarnation
5. The Lament of the Mother of God at the Cross
6. The Resurrection
7. The Dormition
8. The Protecting Veil

The Protecting Veil was the subject of BBC Radio 3's Discovering Music programme in June 2008.
