= Song for Athene =

1993 composition by John Tavener

Song by John Tavener
- Written: 1993
- Published: 1997
- Genre: Classical music
- Length: 7 minutes
- Label: Chester Music
- Composer: John Tavener

"Song for Athene" (also known as "Alleluia. May Flights of Angels Sing Thee to Thy Rest") is a musical composition by British composer John Tavener with lyrics by Mother Thekla, an Orthodox nun, which is intended to be sung a cappella by a four-part (soprano, alto, tenor and bass) choir. It is Tavener's best known work, having been performed by the Westminster Abbey Choir conducted by Martin Neary at the funeral service of Diana, Princess of Wales, on 6 September 1997 as her cortège departed from Westminster Abbey.

Commissioned by the BBC, the piece was written in April 1993 by Tavener as a tribute to Athene Hariades, a young half-Greek actress who was a family friend killed in a cycling accident. At the time that she died, Athene Hariades was working as a teacher of English and Drama at the Hellenic College of London. Tavener said of Hariades: "Her beauty, both outward and inner, was reflected in her love of acting, poetry, music and of the Orthodox Church." He had heard her reading Shakespeare in Westminster Abbey, and after her funeral, developed the idea of composing a song which combined words from the Orthodox funeral service and Shakespeare's Hamlet. The work was published by Chester Music in 1997.

== Music and lyrics ==
"Song for Athene", which has a performance time of about seven minutes, is an elegy consisting of the Hebrew word alleluia ("let us praise the Lord") sung monophonically six times as an introduction to texts excerpted and modified from the funeral service of the Eastern Orthodox Church and from Shakespeare's Hamlet (probably 1599–1601). The lyrics were written by Mother Thekla (18 July 1918 – 7 August 2011), an Orthodox nun who co-founded the Orthodox Monastery of the Assumption near Whitby, North Yorkshire, and whom Tavener called his "spiritual mother". Tavener had come away from the funeral of Athene Hariades with the music of Song for Athene fully formed in his mind. He called Mother Thekla the same day, and said to her: "I want words." She sent him the lyrics by post, which arrived the next day.

The music reaches a climax after the sixth intonation of alleluia with the lines "Weeping at the grave creates the song: Alleluia. Come, enjoy rewards and crowns I have prepared for you." Alleluia is then sung a seventh time as a coda. Following the example of traditional Byzantine music, a continuous ison or drone underlies the work.

Lyrics	Original texts	Source
Alleluia. May flights of angels sing thee to thy rest.	Horatio: Now cracks a noble heart. Good night, sweet prince, And flights of angels sing thee to thy rest!	Hamlet, act 5, scene 2, cf. In paradisum
Alleluia. Remember me, O Lord, when you come into your kingdom.	O thou who reignest over life and death, in the courts of thy Saints grant rest unto him [her] whom thou hast removed from temporal things. And remember me also, when thou comest into thy kingdom.	Orthodox funeral service, Luke 23:42
Alleluia. Give rest, O Lord, to your handmaid, who has fallen asleep.	Where the choirs of the Saints, O Lord, and of the Just, shine like the stars of heaven, give rest to thy servant [hand-maid] who hath fallen asleep, regarding not all his [her] transgressions.	Orthodox funeral service
Alleluia. The Choir of Saints have found the well-spring of life and door of Paradise.	The Choir of the Saints have found the Fountain of Life and the Door of Paradise. May I also find the right way, through repentance. I am a lost sheep. Call me, O Saviour, and save me.	Orthodox funeral service
Alleluia. Life: a shadow and a dream.	Guildenstern: Which dreams, indeed, are ambition; for the very substance of the ambitious is merely the shadow of a dream. Hamlet: A dream itself is but a shadow.	Hamlet, act 2, scene 2
Alleluia. Weeping at the grave creates the song: Alleluia. Come, enjoy rewards and crowns I have prepared for you.	Thou only art immortal, who hast created and fashioned man. For out of the earth were we mortals made, and unto the earth shall we return again, as thou didst command when thou madest me, saying unto me: For earth thou art, and unto the earth shalt thou return. Whither, also, all we mortals wend our way, making of our funeral dirge the song: Alleluia.... Ye who have trod the narrow way most sad; all ye who, in life, have taken upon you the Cross as a yoke, and have followed Me through faith, draw near: Enjoy ye the honours and the crowns which I have prepared for you.	Orthodox funeral service
Alleluia.

== Significant recordings ==
The song has appeared on, among others, a number of recordings of Tavener's work by various choirs, including Ikons (Cala, 1994) by the BBC Singers, Tavener: Innocence (Classics, 1995) by the Westminster Abbey Choir, John Tavener: Byzantia (Classical, 1999) by the Winchester Cathedral Choir, John Tavener: Song for Athene, Svyati and Other Choral Works (Naxos Records, 2000) by the Choir of St John's College, Cambridge, The John Tavener Collection (Universal Classics Group, 2003) by the Choir of the Temple Church and the Holst Singers, and Ikon (Decca, 2006) by The Sixteen.

The Westminster Abbey Choir's performance of the work at the funeral of Diana, Princess of Wales, appears in a recording of the service released by the BBC as Diana, Princess of Wales, 1961–1997: The BBC Recording of the Funeral Service (Uni/London Classics, 1997).

In 2007, Scottish violinist Nicola Benedetti released an album entitled Nicola Benedetti: Vaughan Williams; Tavener which contained an arrangement of the song for solo violin and string orchestra.
