= Funeral of Diana, Princess of Wales =

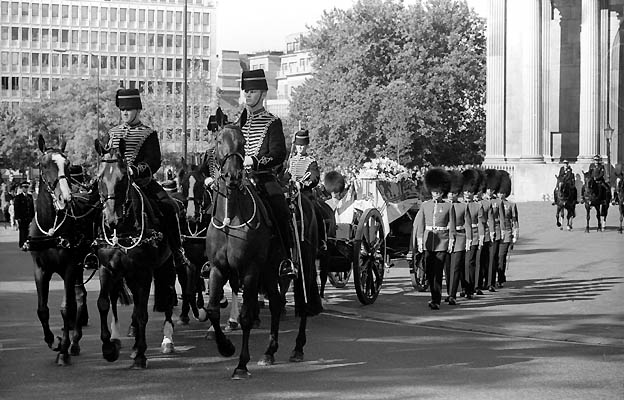
- The funeral cortège passing the Wellington Arch on Hyde Park Corner
- Date: 6 September 1997
- Time: 9:08–15:32 BST (UTC+01:00)
- Duration: 384 minutes
- Venue: Westminster Abbey, London (funeral ceremony); Althorp, Northamptonshire (resting place)
- Location: 51°29′58″N 00°07′39″W
- Type: Royal ceremonial funeral
- Participants: British royal family; Spencer family

The funeral of Diana, Princess of Wales, started on 6 September 1997 at 9:08 am in London, when the tenor bell of Westminster Abbey started tolling to signal the departure of the cortège from Kensington Palace. Diana's coffin was carried from the palace on a gun carriage by riders of the King's Troop and escorted by mounted police along Hyde Park to St James's Palace, where her body had remained for five days before being taken to Kensington Palace. The Union Flag on top of the palace was lowered to half mast. The official ceremony was held at Westminster Abbey in London and finished at the resting place in Diana's family estate of Althorp, Northamptonshire.

Two thousand people attended the ceremony in Westminster Abbey while the British television audience was 32.10 million on average, one of the United Kingdom's highest viewing figures ever. An estimated 2 to 2.5 billion people watched the event worldwide, making it one of the most-watched televised events in history.

== Funeral ==
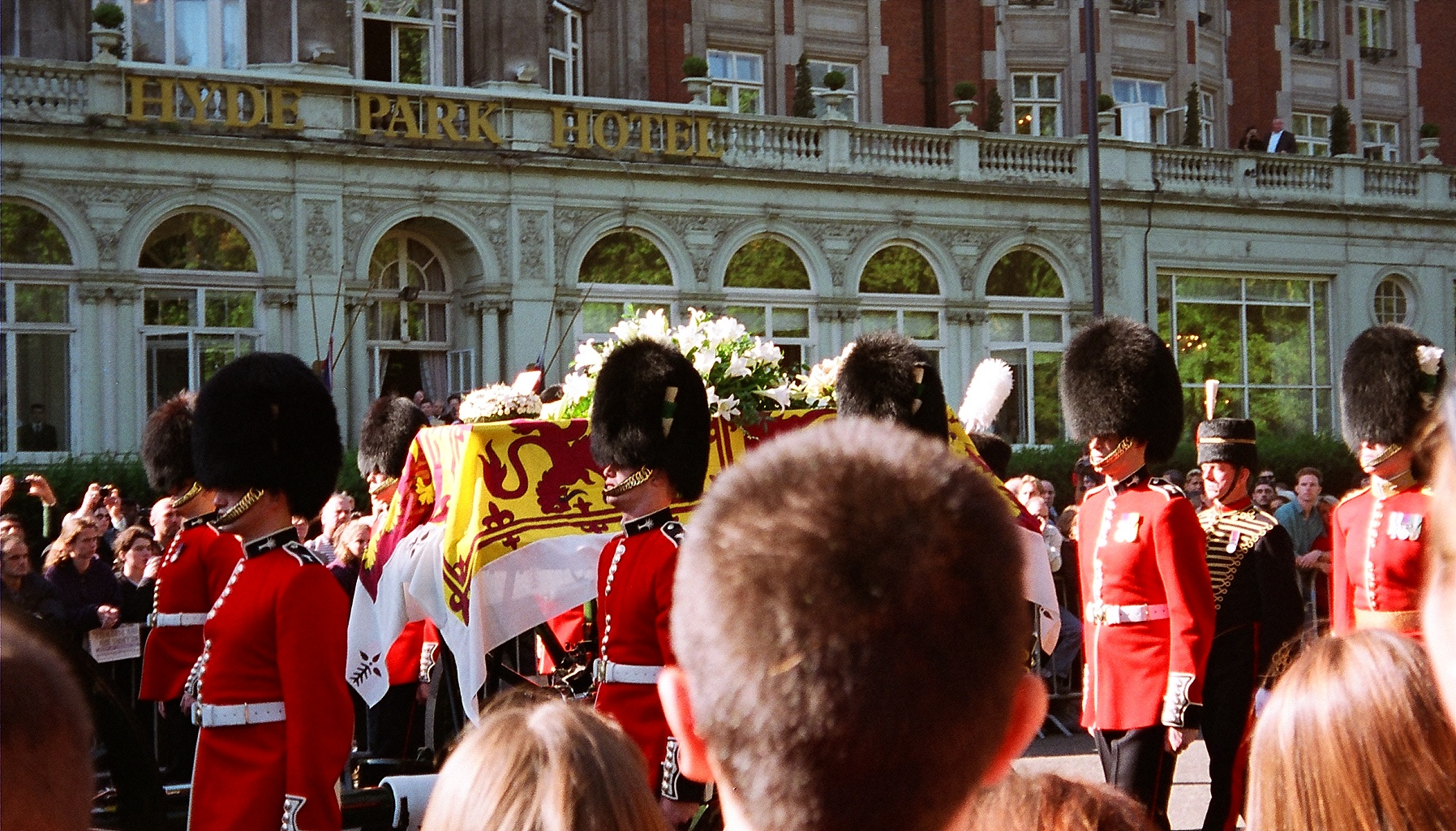
Diana's coffin borne through the streets of London on its way to Westminster Abbey. Her coffin was draped in a pall depicting the royal standard with an ermine border.

Diana's coffin, draped with the royal standard with a differentiating ermine border (i.e. the Other Members' standard), had been brought to London from the Salpêtrière Hospital, via Vélizy – Villacoublay Air Base, Paris, to RAF Northolt by Diana's former husband Charles, Prince of Wales, and her two sisters on 31 August 1997. After being taken to a private mortuary, it was placed at the Chapel Royal, St James's Palace, and later taken to Kensington Palace the night before the funeral.

The funeral plan for the Queen Mother, codenamed "Operation Tay Bridge", had been rehearsed for 22 years and was used as the basis for Diana's funeral. However, the event was not a state funeral; instead, it was a royal ceremonial funeral that included royal pageantry and Anglican funeral liturgy. A large display of flowers was installed at the gates of Kensington Palace and Buckingham Palace. Eight members of the Welsh Guards accompanied Diana's coffin on the one-hour-forty-seven-minute ride through London streets. On top of the coffin were three wreaths of white flowers from her brother, the Earl Spencer, and her sons, Prince William and Prince Harry. There was also a letter from Prince Harry on her coffin addressed to "Mummy". The coffin bore a weight of a quarter of a tonne (250 kg / approx 550 lb) as it was lined with lead, as is tradition with British royalty.

At St James's Palace, Prince Philip, the Prince of Wales, her sons, and her brother joined to walk behind. Five hundred representatives of various charities the Princess had been involved with joined behind them in the funeral cortège. Alastair Campbell later revealed in his diaries that the government and the royal household feared for the security of Prince Charles, believing that he would possibly get attacked by the crowd, thus they ensured that he would be accompanied by his sons. Prince Philip, the Duke of Edinburgh, initially opposed the idea of William and Harry taking part in the funeral procession, but ultimately decided to walk besides them, telling his grandsons "I'll walk if you walk." William later described the experience as "one of the hardest things I've ever done", and Harry mentioned no child "should be asked to do" what they did. Nevertheless, William saw the act as a necessity to maintain "balance between duty and family" and Harry said that he was "very glad" that he took part in the procession. In his 2023 memoir Spare, Harry claimed that the idea of having the boys walk behind their mother's coffin horrified several adults, in particular their uncle Lord Spencer who described it as "a barbarity." Spencer has previously stated that he felt he was lied to about the boys' desire to do the task. Harry also claimed that there were suggestions that William should walk behind the coffin alone, but Harry refused to allow it as had the roles been reversed William would have done the same.

The coffin then passed Buckingham Palace where members of the royal family were waiting outside. Queen Elizabeth II bowed her head as it went by. More than one million people lined the streets of London, and flowers rained down onto the cortège from bystanders. Two screens were erected to relay the Westminster Abbey service in Hyde Park.

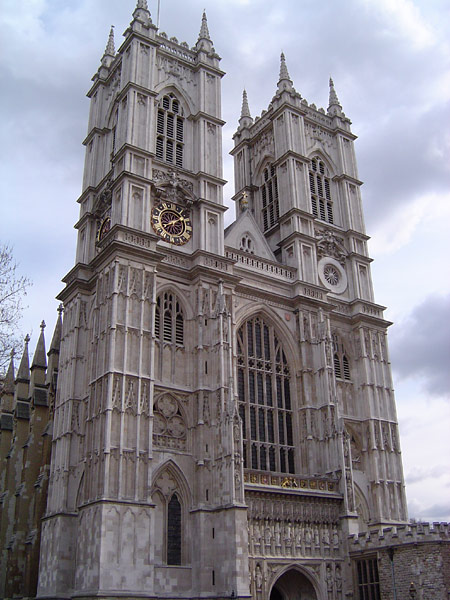
The west towers and main door of Westminster Abbey, venue of the funeral

The ceremony at Westminster Abbey opened at 11:00 BST and lasted one hour and ten minutes. The royal family placed wreaths alongside Diana's coffin in the presence of Britain's living former prime ministers – John Major, Margaret Thatcher, James Callaghan and Edward Heath – and former Conservative MP Winston Churchill, the grandson of World War II-era Prime Minister Sir Winston Churchill. British personalities who attended included Sir Cliff Richard, Sir Elton John, George Michael, Chris de Burgh, Michael Barrymore, Richard Branson, and Richard Attenborough; international guests included US First Lady Hillary Rodham Clinton and former Secretary of State Henry Kissinger, William J. Crowe, French First Lady Bernadette Chirac, Egyptian First Lady Suzanne Mubarak, Queen Noor of Jordan, Tom Hanks, Steven Spielberg, Mariah Carey, Luciano Pavarotti, Tom Cruise, Nicole Kidman, Ruby Wax, Imran Khan and his then wife, Jemima Goldsmith. The prime minister, Tony Blair, read an excerpt from First Epistle to the Corinthians, Chapter 13: "And now abideth faith, hope, love, these three; but the greatest of these is love". Among other invitees were the King of Spain, Princess Margriet of the Netherlands, the Crown Prince and Crown Princess of Japan, the deposed King Constantine II of Greece, and South African president Nelson Mandela.

The Archbishop of Canterbury, George Carey, and the Dean of Westminster, Wesley Carr, were also present in the abbey and delivered the bidding, the prayers, and the commendation. The service was sung by the Choir of Westminster Abbey and conducted by Organist and Master of the Choristers, Martin Neary; the organist was Martin Baker. Music before the service included the hymn tune "Eventide", "Adagio in E", the hymn tune "Rhosymedre", Ich ruf zu dir, Herr Jesu Christ, BWV 639, "Fantasia in C minor, BWV 537", "Adagio in G minor", "Symphony No. 9", Pachelbel's Canon (which was misidentified by the commentator as "Albinoni's Adagio"), and Variation IX (Adagio) "Nimrod". The Anglican service opened with the traditional singing of "God Save the Queen". The funeral started with the choir singing the Funeral Sentences, composed by William Croft and Henry Purcell. Pieces by Johann Sebastian Bach, Antonín Dvořák, Camille Saint-Saëns, Gustav Holst, and other composers were played throughout the ceremony. The hymns were "I Vow to Thee, My Country", by Sir Cecil Spring Rice to the tune by Gustav Holst; "The King of Love My Shepherd Is" by Henry Baker to the tune Dominus Regit Me by John Bacchus Dykes; "Make Me a Channel of Your Peace" to the tune by Sebastian Temple and "Guide me, O thou great Redeemer", by William Williams to the tune Cwm Rhondda by John Hughes. The chant Libera me was sung by the BBC Singers, together with Lynne Dawson, to the tune by Giuseppe Verdi.

I thought it was very important to project it from a nation's standpoint. I wanted to make it sound like a country singing it. From the first couple of lines I wrote [which began "Goodbye England's Rose"], the rest sort of fell into place

— Bernie Taupin on writing the lyrics for "Candle in the Wind 1997"

During the service, Elton John sang a 1997 rendition of "Candle in the Wind", with new lyrics written as a tribute to Diana. He had contacted his writing partner Bernie Taupin, asking him to revise the lyrics of his 1973 Marilyn Monroe tribute song "Candle in the Wind" to honour Diana, and Taupin rewrote the song accordingly. Only a month before Diana's death she had been photographed comforting John at the funeral of their mutual friend Gianni Versace at Milan Cathedral. Files released by The National Archives showed that the Dean of Westminster, Wesley Carr, had personally appealed to senior aides at the palace to secure John's performance at the funeral, insisting on the "inclusion of something of the modern world that the princess represented". A solo performance by a saxophonist had been considered as a second option.

Diana's sister Sarah gave the first reading, a poem titled Turn Again To Life by Mary Lee Hall, and her other sister Jane gave the second reading, a poem titled Time Is taken from Music and Other Poems by Henry van Dyke Jr. Her brother Charles gave the eulogy, in which he rebuked the press for their treatment of his sister. "It is a point to remember that of all the ironies about Diana, perhaps the greatest was this – a girl given the name of the ancient goddess of hunting was, in the end, the most hunted person of the modern age," Spencer said during his speech.

"Song for Athene" by British composer John Tavener, with text by Mother Thekla, a Greek Orthodox nun, drawn from the Orthodox liturgy and Shakespeare's Hamlet, was sung as Diana's cortège departed from the main nave of Westminster Abbey. This was followed after a one-minute silence by half-muffled change ringing on the abbey's ten bells.

== Burial ==
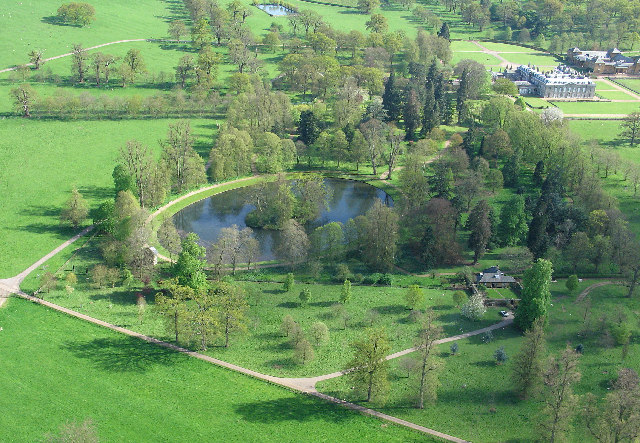
Aerial view of Althorp; the house is at top right. Diana is buried on the small tree-covered island in the middle of the ornamental Round Oval lake.

The burial occurred privately later the same day. Diana's former husband, sons, mother, siblings, a close friend, and a clergyman were present. Diana's body was clothed in a black long-sleeved, three-quarter length woollen cocktail dress designed by Catherine Walker which she had chosen some weeks before, a pair of black pantyhose, and a pair of black shoes. A set of rosary beads was placed in her hands, a gift she had received from Mother Teresa, who died the same week as Diana. In her hands there was also a photograph of her sons, which travelled around with her and had been found in her handbag. Her grave is on an island (52.283082°N 1.000278°W) within the grounds of Althorp Park, the Spencer family home for centuries. The ground was consecrated by the Bishop of Peterborough prior to the burial.

At the ceremony, the Royal Standard which had covered the coffin was removed. Paul Burrell, Diana's former butler, claimed that the standard had been removed by her brother moments before she was buried, and replaced with the Spencer family standard. He claimed the Earl said that "She (Diana) is a Spencer now." Burrell also condemned the move, telling the Daily Mirror that "It had more to do with his Spencer v Windsor war than doing what Diana would have wanted. It was inappropriate and disrespectful. I knew it was not what Diana would have wanted. With that act, her brother was depriving the Princess of her proper status in life – a status of which she was proud." Lord Spencer called Burrell's comments "hurtful lies" and said in a statement: "The Queen's standard was removed as part of the ceremony by her own officer in a dignified and pre-agreed manner".

The original plan was for Diana to be buried in the Spencer family vault at the local St Mary's Church in nearby Great Brington, but Lord Spencer said that he was concerned about public safety and security and the onslaught of visitors that might overwhelm Great Brington. He decided that Diana would be buried where her grave could be easily cared for and visited in privacy by William, Harry, and other Spencer relatives.

The island is in an ornamental lake known as The Round Oval within Althorp Park's gardens. A path with thirty-six oak trees, marking each year of her life, leads to the Oval. Four black swans swim in the lake. In the water there are water lilies, which, in addition to white roses, were Diana's favourite flowers. On the southern verge of the Round Oval sits the Summerhouse, previously in the gardens of Admiralty House, London, and now adapted to serve as a memorial to Diana. An ancient arboretum stands nearby, which contains trees planted by the family. The Spencer family's decision to bury the Princess in this secluded – and private – location has enabled them to visit her grave in private.

The burial party was provided by the 2nd Battalion, The Princess of Wales's Royal Regiment (Queen's and Royal Hampshires), who were given the honour of carrying the Princess across to the island and laying her to rest. Diana was the Regiment's Colonel-in-Chief from 1992 to 1996.

== Services elsewhere ==
On the same day, services of commemoration and events honouring the Princess were held in various cities and towns across the United Kingdom and many streets remained deserted with the population watching the funeral broadcast at their homes. In Manchester the national minute's silence started with "a maroon flare fired by mortar from the roof of the Victorian Town Hall" and ended "by the pealing of a single muffled bell". People gathered in the Albert Square and visited the Town Hall to sign the book of condolences. The Lord Mayor, Gerry Carroll, laid a bouquet as a tribute to the Princess on behalf of the city. In Bolton a memorial service was held with leaders from all churches in attendance, followed by another memorial service in Blackburn Cathedral. In Liverpool people came together at the Parish Church of Our Lady and St Nicholas to pay their respects. In Scotland, the funeral was broadcast to mourners on screens set up at the Ross Theatre in Edinburgh. A memorial service was held in Diana's honour, at which the Queen's chaplain in Scotland, Charles Robertson, officiated. In Derry, the mayor and deputy mayor laid a wreath at the city Cenotaph. Large crowds showed up in the streets of Cardiff to watch the funeral on screens. A service was held at Llandaff Cathedral, attended by 700 guests, including the Secretary of State for Wales Ron Davies, Cardiff's Lord Mayor Max Phillips, as well as MPs and volunteers from Diana's charities. Toll booths on Severn Bridges remained closed during the national minute's silence. On Sunday, 7 September, an additional service for Diana was held at Westminster Abbey in response to popular demand.

=== Outside of the United Kingdom ===
The flag of Ireland was also flown at half-mast on all state buildings on the day of Diana's funeral. On the same day, a memorial service was held at Washington National Cathedral and was attended by 2,170 people including the British ambassador John Kerr, the US ambassador to the United Nations Bill Richardson, and chairman of The Washington Post Co. executive committee Katharine Graham. In Tonga, a group of mourners organised a traditional wake, or pongipongi, after the funeral. The days leading up to and after Diana's funeral the residents of Paris gathered around the Flame of Liberty to mourn. The statue is directly located over the entrance of the Pont de l'Alma tunnel where the crash occurred. The statue became an unofficial memorial for Princess Diana which people still visit today. The French people brought flowers, photos, messages, ribbons, candles, etc. to pay respects to the fallen princess, while the government held moments of silence in Paris. Australia held national memorial services which were broadcast live. American people mourned for Princess Diana with candlelit vigils. Thousands of Royal Family fans in San Francisco gathered for a solemn candlelit march.

=== Media coverage ===
David Dimbleby presented the funeral on the BBC, while Trevor McDonald fronted the ITN coverage, and was joined by a team of correspondents including John Suchet and Julia Somerville.

The broadcast required one of the largest media operations ever for a royal event, involving more than 100 cameras and more than 300 reporters in London. BBC and ITN received special permission to film inside Westminster Abbey with the agreement of no close-up shots of the mourners inside. The world-wide television audience for the event has been estimated between 2 and 2.5 billion people, with coverage to more than 180 countries. In the United Kingdom, the funeral was watched by 31 million, which is about 59% of the entire British population at the time. These statistics make it one of the most watched live broadcasts to date (second only to the 1966 FIFA World Cup Final). The Boston Globe reported that the BBC provided coverage to nearly 200 countries. This was the biggest story they had ever carried and it dominated the media for an entire week.

In North America, which is five to nine hours behind British Summer Time, the funeral occurred during the early morning hours of a Saturday, a time that is normally reserved for children's programming. The main networks in the United States (ABC, CBS, NBC, and Fox) and Canada (CBC, CTV, and Global) sent their top presenters. The funeral attracted 33.2 million viewers in the United States, and the early morning coverage produced strong network ratings across the major broadcasters. For example, NBC had a high rating of 8.1/10, according to The Washington Post. In Australia, Nine Network had the highest ratings, with 1.65 million viewers.

BBC Radio broadcast the funeral in forty-four languages around the world. Along with media coverage, there was also extensive international radio coverage provided to countries without access to television broadcasts.

== See also ==
- Concert for Diana
- List of largest funerals
