= Stephen Layton =

English conductor (born 1966)

Stephen David Layton MBE (born 23 December 1966) is an English conductor.

He was raised in Derby, where his father was a church organist. He was a chorister at Winchester Cathedral, and subsequently won scholarships to Eton College and then King's College, Cambridge as an organ scholar under Stephen Cleobury.

While studying at Cambridge, Layton founded the mixed-voice choir Polyphony in 1986. He was appointed the musical director of the Holst Singers in 1993, replacing Hilary Davan Wetton, who had founded the group in 1978. Layton has been assistant organist at Southwark Cathedral, and musical director of Wokingham Choral Society. From 1997, he was organist and subsequently director of music at the Temple Church. From 1999 to 2004, he was chief conductor of the Netherlands Chamber Choir. From 2000 to 2012 he was chief guest conductor of the Danish National Vocal Ensemble. From 2006 to 2023, he was director of music at Trinity College, Cambridge. In November 2009, the City of London Sinfonia announced the appointment of Layton as its second artistic director, effective with the 2010–2011 season, with the title of principal conductor.

Layton has premiered new works and recordings by a number of composers, including Arvo Pärt, Thomas Adès, Jaakko Mäntyjärvi and James MacMillan. His realisation of John Tavener's The Veil of the Temple was premiered in 2003 at the Temple Church London. It was subsequently performed in 2004 at the Royal Albert Hall during the BBC Proms, and in the Avery Fisher Hall, New York, as part of the Lincoln Center Festival.

Stephen Layton's discography on Hyperion ranges from Handel and Bach with original instruments to Arvo Pärt, Paweł Łukaszewski, Lauridsen, Whitacre and Ēriks Ešenvalds. Recordings with Polyphony include Gabriel Jackson, Paweł Łukaszewski, Francis Poulenc, John Tavener, and Ẽriks Ešenvalds. With the Trinity College Choir, a notable recording is of work by the Finnish composer Jaakko Mäntyjärvi, including the specially written Trinity Service (2019).

He has received two Gramophone Awards in the UK and the Diapason d'Or in France, the Echo Deutscher Musikpreis in Germany, the Compact Award in Spain, and four Grammy nominations in the USA.

Layton was appointed Member of the Order of the British Empire (MBE) in the 2020 Birthday Honours for services to classical music.

Cultural offices
| Preceded by Hilary Davan Wetton | Musical Director, Holst Singers; 1993–present | Succeeded by incumbent |
| Preceded by Dr John Birch | Director of Music, Temple Church; 1997–2006 | Succeeded by James Vivian |
| Preceded by Richard Marlow | Director of Music, Trinity College, Cambridge; 2006–present | Succeeded by incumbent |
| Preceded by Richard Hickox | Artistic Director and Principal Conductor, City of London Sinfonia; 2010–2016 | Succeeded by (post vacant) |
