= Hilary Davan Wetton =

British conductor

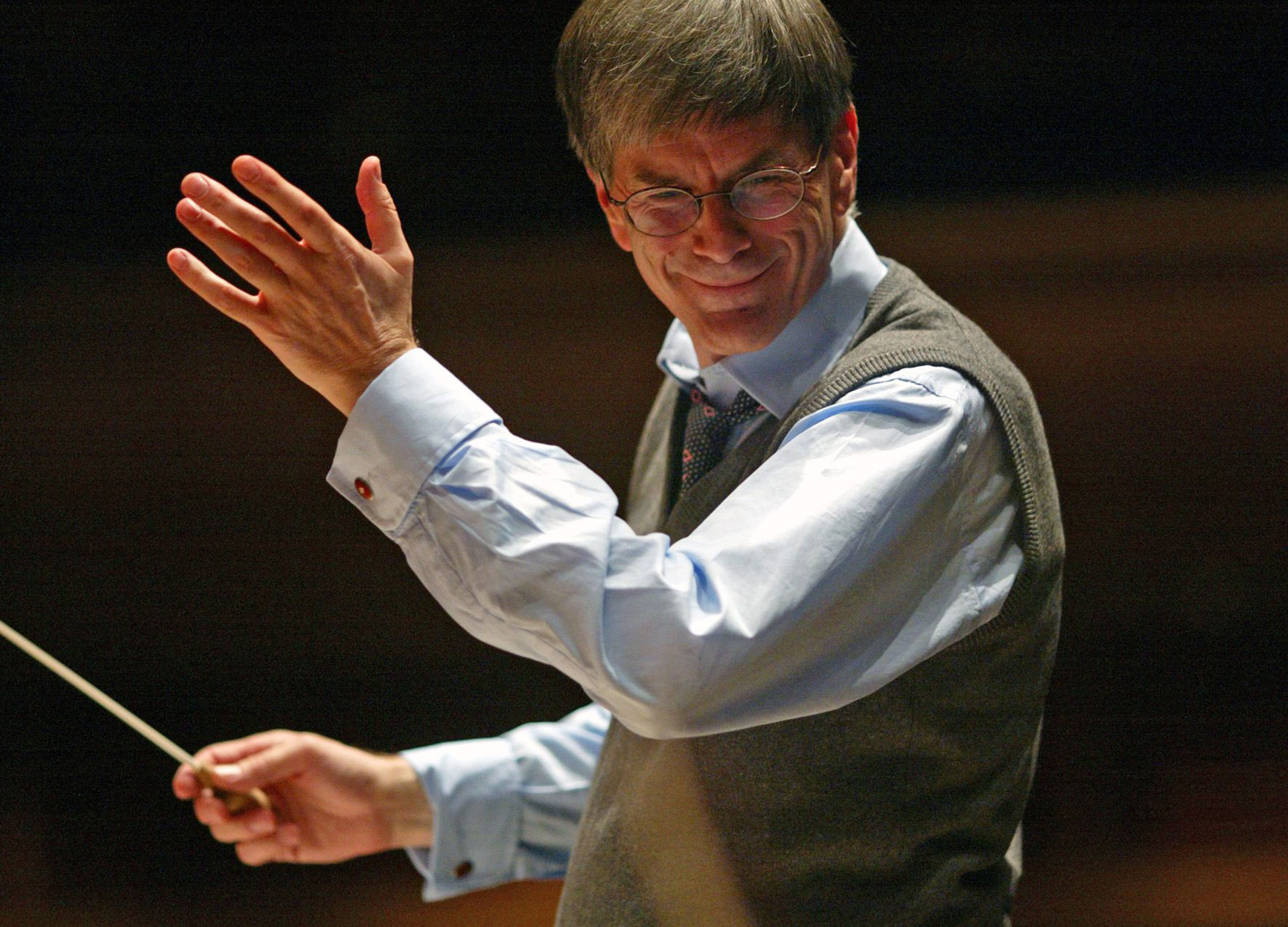
Hilary Davan Wetton

Hilary John Davan Wetton (born 23 December 1943) is a British conductor.

== Biography ==
He has married three times, in 1964 to Elizabeth Tayler and in 1989 to Alison Kelly. He is married to Professor Tonia Vincent, with whom he has one daughter.

== Career ==
Davan Wetton is musical director of the City of London Choir and Alina Orchestra, as well as associate conductor of the London Mozart Players. He is conductor emeritus of the Milton Keynes City Orchestra (of which he was founding conductor) and of the Guildford Choral Society which he conducted from 1968 to 2008. Other choirs of which he has been musical director include the Leicester and Hastings Philharmonic Choirs and the Surrey Festival Chorus. He was founder conductor of the Holst Singers with whom he made a number of recordings. His discography also includes the Holst Choral Symphony, with the Guildford Choral Society and the Royal Philharmonic Orchestra, which won the Diapason d'Or, and several recordings with the City of London Choir, including Flowers of the Field with the London Mozart Players (number two in the Classical Charts for eight consecutive weeks) and The Nation's Favourite Carols – with the RPO – which reached number one in the chart. Orchestral recordings include Holst's The Planets with the LPO, which was the recommended version in the Penguin Guide, and a series of symphonic recordings with the MKCO of nineteenth-century English symphonies by Samuel Wesley, Cipriani Potter, William Sterndale Bennett and William Crotch.

In the opera pit Davan Wetton has appeared with Travelling Opera, for whom he conducted Cosi Fan Tutte, The Marriage of Figaro, Carmen and The Barber of Seville. In 1991 he conducted for the French company Ballet du Nord, the first ever danced version of Mozart's Requiem in a double bill with Stravinsky's Apollo at London's Sadlers Wells Theatre. He has also conducted Madame Butterfly for Co-Opera in the Marlowe Theatre, Canterbury.

Davan Wetton was director of music at St Albans School, Cranleigh School, St Paul's Girls School and Tonbridge School, and has conducted some of the British youth orchestras. He also has an association with the National Children's Orchestra. For 25 years, he directed the Classical Roadshow, which commissioned a wide range of works for performance by massed children's groups with professional orchestras and narrators. He is an Honorary Fellow of the Birmingham Conservatoire, where he conducted the orchestra from 1983 to 1987; he was professor of conducting at the Guildhall School of Music from 2011 to 2013. He was senior music associate at Somerville College, Oxford, from 2015 to 2018.

He appears as a guest conductor with choirs and orchestras both in Britain and overseas, and has performed on Radio 3. He introduced and conducted the Classic FM Masterclass programme from 1989 to 1994, as well as teaching Jo Brand the organ for the BBC1 series Play it Again. He has made recordings with the Military Wives Choirs the 2018 disc, Remember was created to mark the centenary of the end of the First World War.

He has been awarded honorary degrees by the Open University (MA) and de Montfort University (DMus).
