= The Lamb (poem) =

1789 poem by English poet William Blake

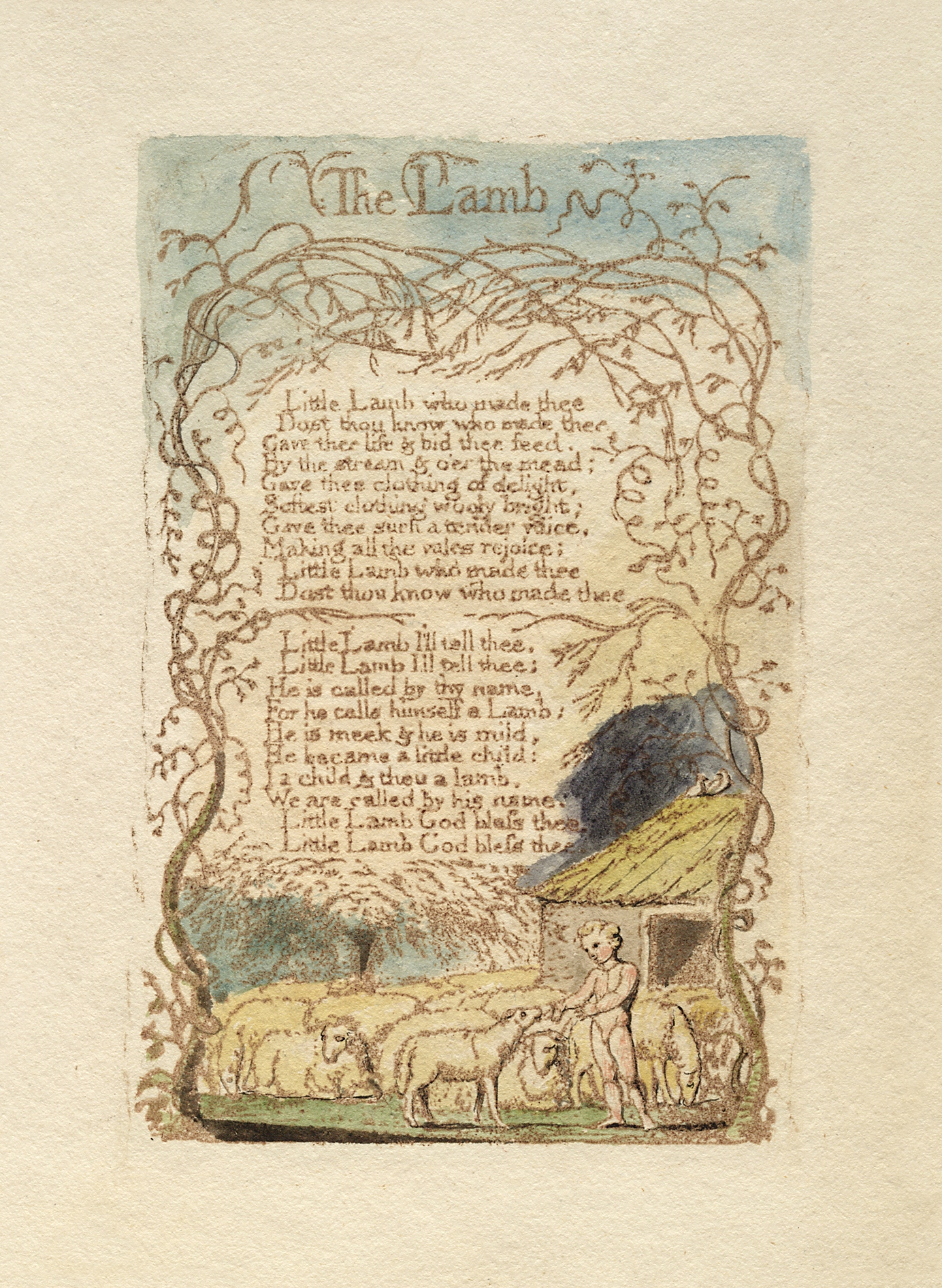
Songs of Innocence and of Experience, copy C, 1789, 1794 (Library of Congress), object 8, "The Lamb" currently held at the Library of Congress

The Lamb recited

"The Lamb" is a poem by William Blake, published in Songs of Innocence in 1789.

"The Lamb" is the counterpart poem to Blake's poem: "The Tyger" in Songs of Experience. Blake wrote Songs of Innocence as a contrary to the Songs of Experience – a central tenet in his philosophy and a central theme in his work. Like many of Blake's works, the poem is about Christianity. The lamb is a frequently used name of Jesus Christ, who is also called "The Lamb of God" in the Gospel of John 1:29 and 36, as well as throughout John's Book of Revelation at the end of the New Testament.

== Poem ==
Little Lamb who made thee?
Dost thou know who made thee?
Gave thee life and bid thee feed
By the stream and o'er the mead;
Gave thee clothing of delight,
Softest clothing wooly bright;
Gave thee such a tender voice,
Making all the vales rejoice!
Little Lamb who made thee?
Dost thou know who made thee?

Little Lamb I'll tell thee,
Little Lamb I'll tell thee:
He is called by thy name,
For he calls himself a Lamb:
He is meek and he is mild,
He became a little child:
I a child and thou a lamb,
We are called by his name:
Little Lamb God bless thee.
Little Lamb God bless thee.

== Structure ==
At first glance, this poem appears to consist of rhyming couplets, and the first and last couplet in the first stanza could be said to exhibit identical rhyme; however, the rhyme is an exact repeat of the three last words, or phrase, "who made thee," and the last couplet is a repetition of the first verbatim. The effect is that of a refrain in a song, such as a lullaby in this "Song of Innocence." The speaker is even a child. The final word of the third and fourth lines (the first couplet in the body of the text), "feed mead," rhyme identically with the final word of the first two lines, "thee," creating a smooth transition.

The body of the first stanza follows the rhyming scheme AABBCC: "feed mead delight bright voice rejoice;" the body of the second, follows the rhyming scheme ABCCBA: "name lamb mild child lamb name"—a pattern found in the Bible and a kernel of a larger Hebraic technique or device.

An exact repeat of the entire line is employed in the second stanza's first and last couplets: the first two lines, and then the last two different lines, with the ABCCBA scheme in the body. The whole is indeed effective, one might even say "innocent" with perfect truth.

In the first stanza, the speaker, a child, asks the lamb who its creator is, and if it knows who; the child knows and tells the lamb the answer in the second stanza.

== Musical settings ==
Like the other Songs of Innocence and Songs of Experience, "The Lamb" may have been intended to be sung, but no records survive of Blake's own musical settings. It was set to music by Vaughan Williams in his 1958 song cycle Ten Blake Songs, although he described it as "that horrible little lamb – a poem that I hate". It was also given a setting by Sir John Tavener, who explained: "'The Lamb' came to me fully grown and was written in an afternoon and dedicated to my nephew Simon for his 3rd birthday." American poet Allen Ginsberg set the poem to music, along with several other of Blake's poems, in 1969 and included it on his album Songs of Innocence and Experience by William Blake. Ginsberg's songs were re-worked by Steven Taylor for the album Songs of Innocence & of Experience: Shewing The Two Contrary States Of The Human Soul, released in 2019, by Ace Records, to coincide with the Blake exhibition at Tate Britain.

== Gallery ==
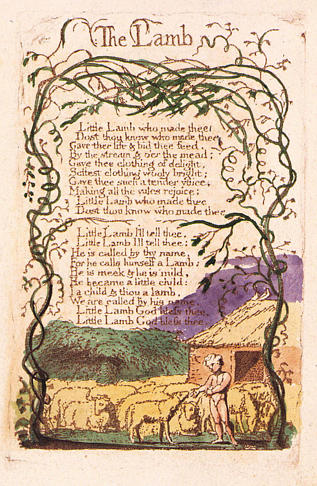
Songs of Innocence copy B 1789 Library of Congress object 29 "The Lamb"

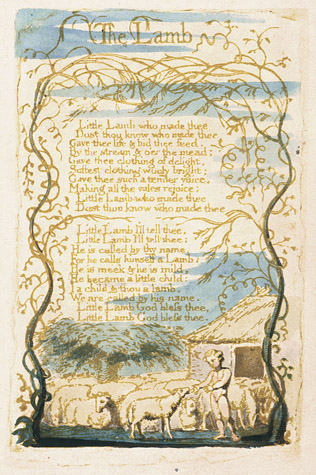
Songs of Innocence, copy G, 1789 (Yale Center for British Art) object 8 "The Lamb"

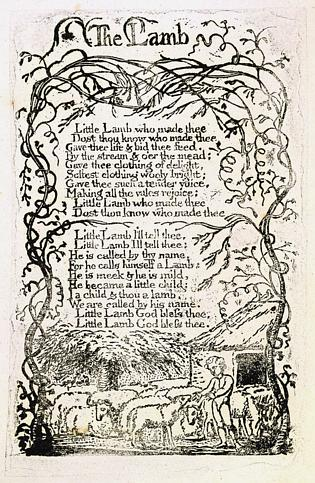
Songs of Innocence copy U 1789 The Houghton Library object 11 "The Lamb"

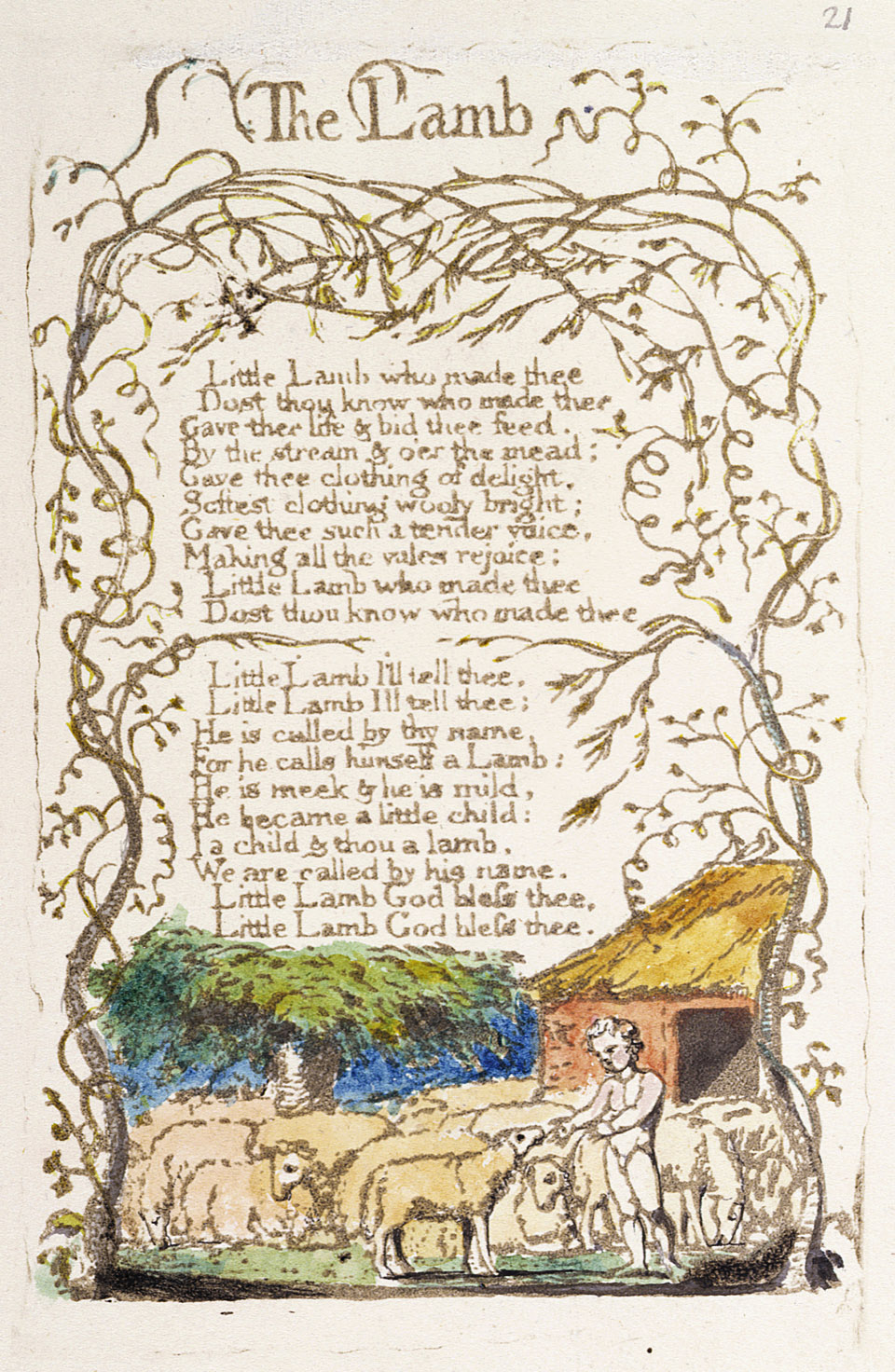
Songs of Innocence and of Experience, copy A, 1795 (British Museum), object 8 "The Lamb"

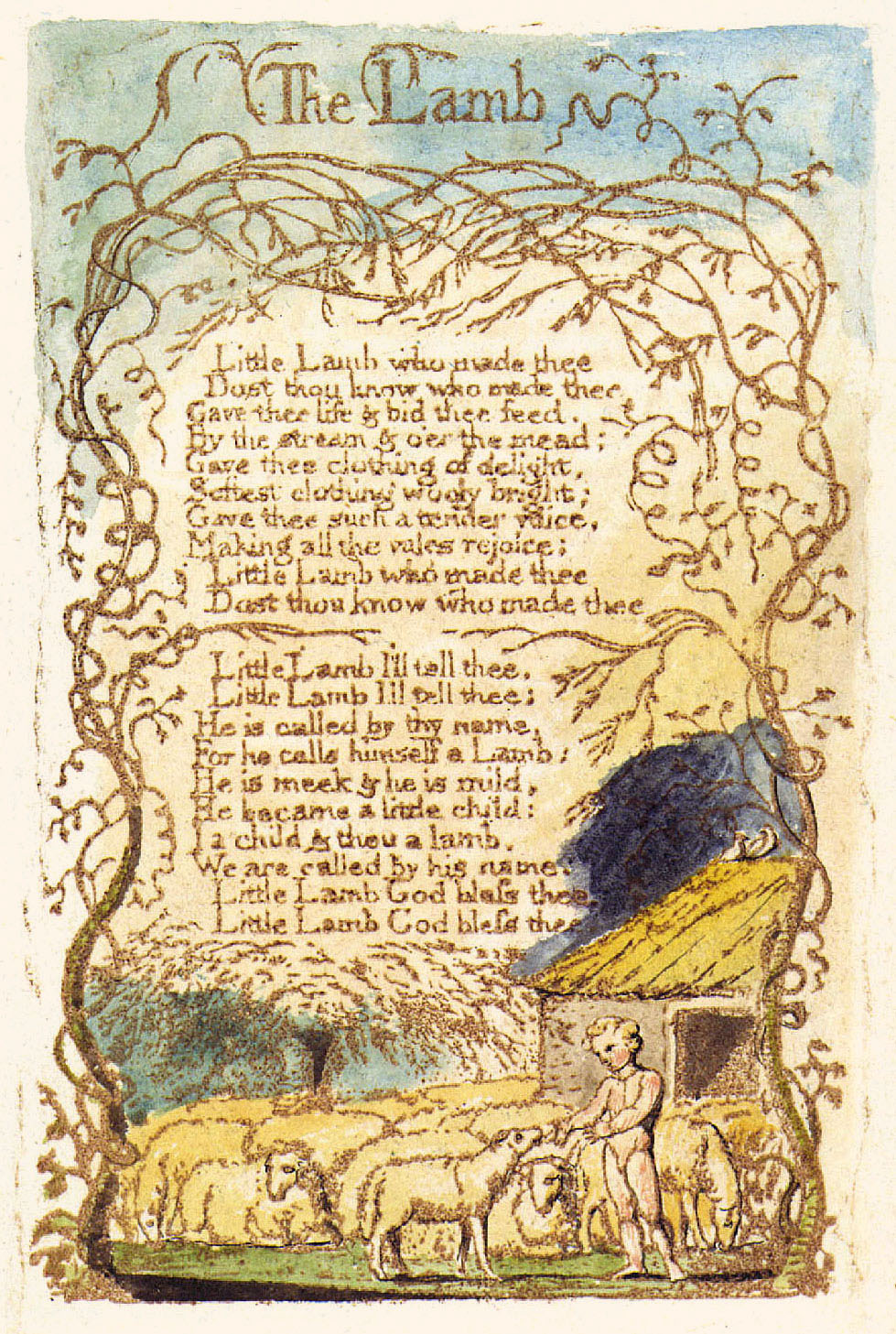
Songs of Innocence and of Experience, copy C, 1789, 1794 (Library of Congress), object 8 "The Lamb"

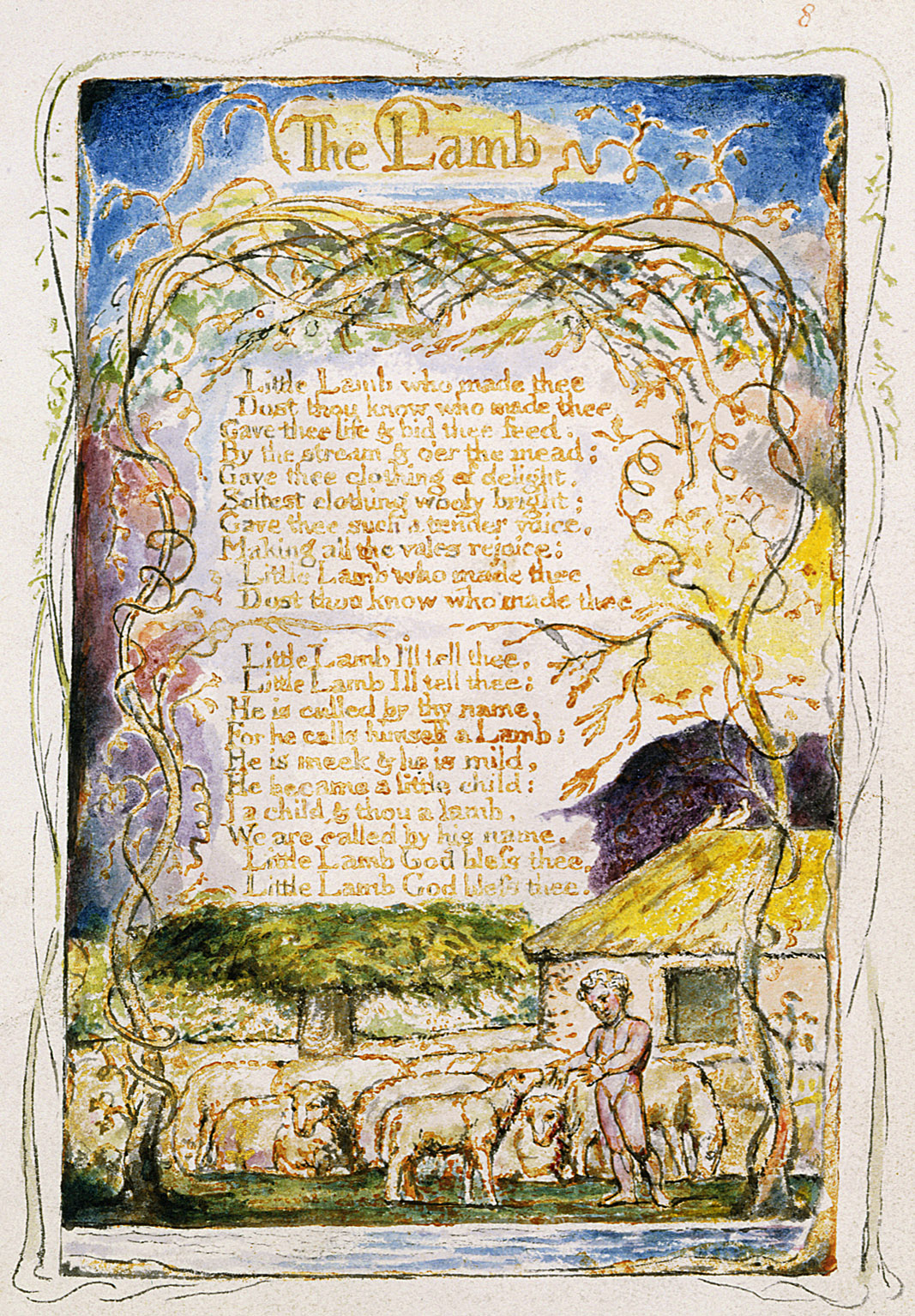
Songs of Innocence and of Experience, copy Y, 1825 (Metropolitan Museum of Art), object 8 "The Lamb"

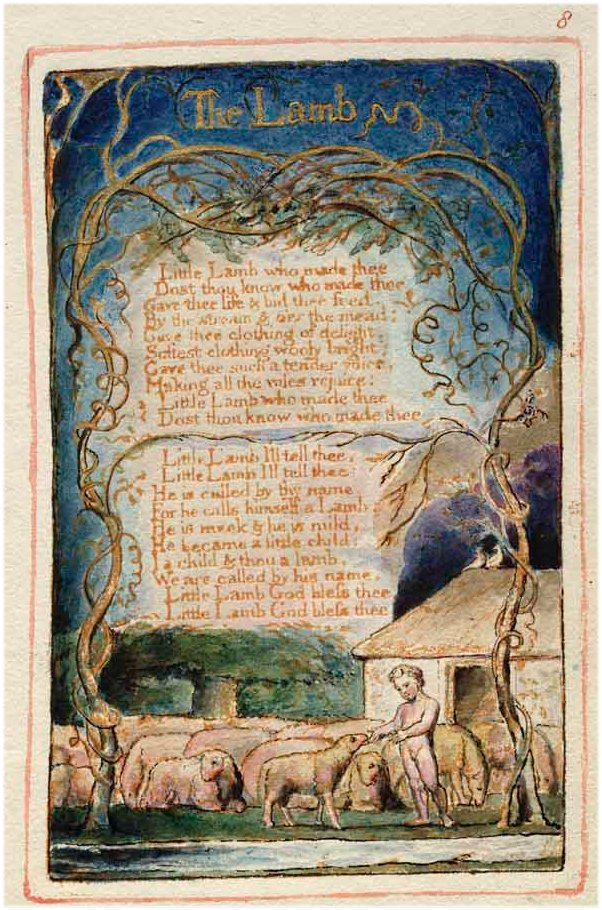
Songs of Innocence and of Experience, copy Z, 1826 (Library of Congress) object 8 "The Lamb"

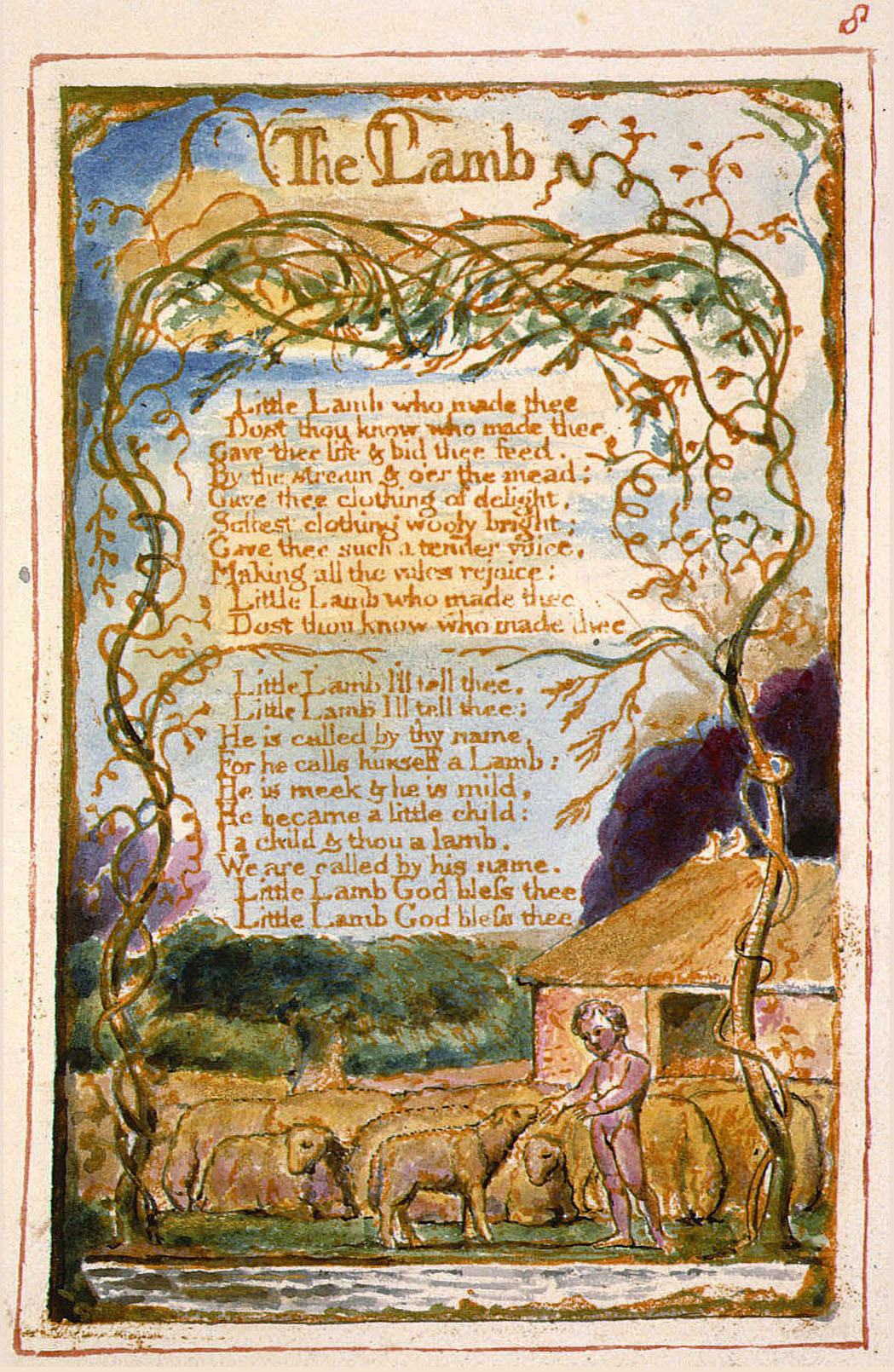
Songs of Innocence and of Experience, copy AA, 1826 (The Fitzwilliam Museum), object 8 "The Lamb"
