= The Veil of the Temple =

Choral music piece

The Veil of the Temple is a piece of choral music by British composer Sir John Tavener. Identified by Tavener as "the supreme achievement of my life", it is set for four choirs, several orchestras and soloists and lasts at least seven hours. It is based on text from a number of religions. It was commissioned by the Temple Church, in London, and received its world premiere performance there in June 2003.

== Notable performances ==
After its premiere, The Veil of the Temple was not performed in the UK in its entirety for another 22 years. It was performed at Usher Hall to open the 2025 Edinburgh International Festival, conducted by Sofi Jeannin and sung by the Edinburgh Festival Chorus, the Monteverdi Choir and the National Youth Choir of Scotland.

The US premiere took place on 24 July 2004 at Avery Fisher Hall, conducted by Stephen Layton.

The work was premiered in Germany in 2007 by the Rundfunkchor Berlin, conducted by Simon Halsey.

Tavener also published a concert version, about two and a half hours long, which had its world premiere at the BBC Proms on 1 August 2004.

== Structure ==
The piece is split into eight cycles. The first seven follow the same structure, with each cycle being a higher key than the previous. For example, Cycles I to VII open with a soprano solo. This is then followed by a setting of the kyrie in either English or the original Greek. Successive cycles add additional musical complexity and words to each movement, with the result that cycle I takes about 20 minutes to perform, but cycle VII takes 1.5 hours.

Cycles I to VII use the following structure:

| Title | Section | Sung by | Notes |
|---|---|---|---|
| Mystical Love Song of the Sufis | | Solo soprano | |
| Primordial Call | | Orchestra | |
| God's Creation | Kyrie 1 | Choir | |
| | Tohu, Vohu, Tahem. Logos | Choir, with soloists | |
| | In the beginning | Solo bass | |
| | Kyrie 2 | Choir | |
| | You mantle yourself in light. | Choir | |
| | Kyrie 3 | Choir | |
| Outside the Gates of Paradise | O Blessed Paradise | Choir, with soloists | |
| | Kyrie 4 | Choir | |
| | What God is. | Choir | |
| | Kyrie 5 | Choir | |
| Our Father | Lords Prayer | Choir | |
| | Kyrie 6 | Choir | |
| Holy Mary | O Mary Theotokos. | Choir | |
| | Hail, O Mother of God! | Choir | |
| | Here I stand now praying. | Choir | |
| | In thee rejoiceth. | Choir | Cycles V to VII only |
| | Awed by the beauty | Choir | Cycles V to VII only |
| | Alleelouia 1 | Choir | Cycles V to VII only |
| | Kyrie 7 | Choir | |
| Alleluia. Theos Erastos | Alleelouia 2 | Choir | |
| | Kyrie 8 | Basses | |
| | Kyrie 9 | Choir | |
| Gospel of St John | Gospel of John | Solo Bass | |
| | Alleelouia 3 | Choir | |
| Thrice-Holy Hymn - Resurrection | Te re rem. | Choir | Not cycle VII |
| | Agios ischyros. | Choir | Not cycle VII |
| | Have mercy on me, O God. | Choir | Not cycle VII |
| | Agios Athanatos 1 | Choir | Not cycle VII |
| | In Thy kingdom remember us, O Lord. | Choir | Not cycle VII |
| Beatitudes of St. Isaac the Syrian | The Beatitudes | single voice part | Not cycle VII |
| | Ágiós Athánatos 2 | Choir | Not cycle VII |
| | Christos anestee | Choir | Not cycle VII |
| Psalm | | Solo Bass | Not cycle VII |
