= Pilgrimage (2001 film) =

Documentary by Werner Herzog

- Directed by: Werner Herzog
- Produced by: Werner Herzog Filmproduktion
- Release date: 2001
- Running time: 18 minutes
- Language: English

Pilgrimage is a 2001 documentary film by Werner Herzog. Accompanied only by music, the film alternates between shots of pilgrims near the tomb of Saint Sergei in Sergiyev Posad, Russia and pilgrims at the Basilica of Guadalupe in Mexico. The score was composed by John Tavener and performed by the BBC Symphony Orchestra with vocal accompaniment by Parvin Cox and the Westminster Cathedral Choir. The film begins with a supposed quote by Thomas à Kempis, invented by Herzog.
