= Krishna (opera) =

2005 opera by John Taverner

Krishna (alternately titled Krsnalīla or The Play of Krishna), is an opera composed by John Tavener to his own libretto. It was his final work.

In 2020 David Pountney, former artistic director of the Welsh National Opera, announced that Krishna, which was completed in 2005 but had remained in manuscript form, will be staged by Grange Park Opera. Pountney will direct the production, and it will premiere in 2026. The opera was introduced to Pountney in 2013 by Prince Charles, a former friend of Tavener.

In the opera, a narrator, a baritone role, recounts 14 vignettes from the life of Krishna in English, except for one scene in Sanskrit.

== See also ==
- Sri Krishna Leela Tarangini
