= Thunder Entered Her =

1990 choral piece by John Tavener

Thunder Entered Her is a choral piece written by the English composer John Tavener in 1990. It was commissioned by the St Albans Chamber Choir and it is written for SATB chorus, handbells and pipe organ.

The simple lyrics "Thunder entered her / And made no sound" are taken from the Hymns on the Nativity of Saint Ephrem the Syrian (c. 306–373), and describe the virginal conception of Jesus within Mary. The characteristic juxtaposition by Ephrem of opposites or paradoxical elements continues as the child is described as "The Shepherd of all ... [who] became a lamb." The quotation ends with a lamb entering the world "bleating", featuring a melismatic tenor solo.

The multi-layered composition features a ritualistic use of handbells. Tavener employs spatial techniques such as placing a smaller chorus, which intones the Velichayem [We magnify you], and the handbells at a distance from the main chorus. Tension is built by adding low organ roulades representing thunder that punctuate the text and are accompanied by several "Amen" from the main body of the choir. The work closes with a tenor solo, marked "The Sacrificial Lamb", which represents the birth and Passion of Christ.

== Lyrics ==
Velichayem Tya. [We magnify you]
Thunder entered her
And made no sound
There entered the Shepherd of all,
And in her He became
The Lamb, bleating as He comes forth.
Ameen [sic].

— Nativity Hymn No. 11 by St Ephrem the Syrian (306–373)

== Notable recordings ==
Notable recordings of this composition include:

Ensemble	Conductor	Label	Release	Catalogue
Winchester Cathedral Choir, David Dunnett (organ), Iain Simcock (handbells)	David Hill	Virgin	1994	VC545035-2
Ensemble BBC Singers	Simon Joly	Cala	1994	CACD88023
