= London Sinfonietta =

English contemporary chamber orchestra

- Chamber orchestra
- Founded: 1968
- Location: London, England
- Concert hall: Southbank Centre
- Website: www.londonsinfonietta.org.uk

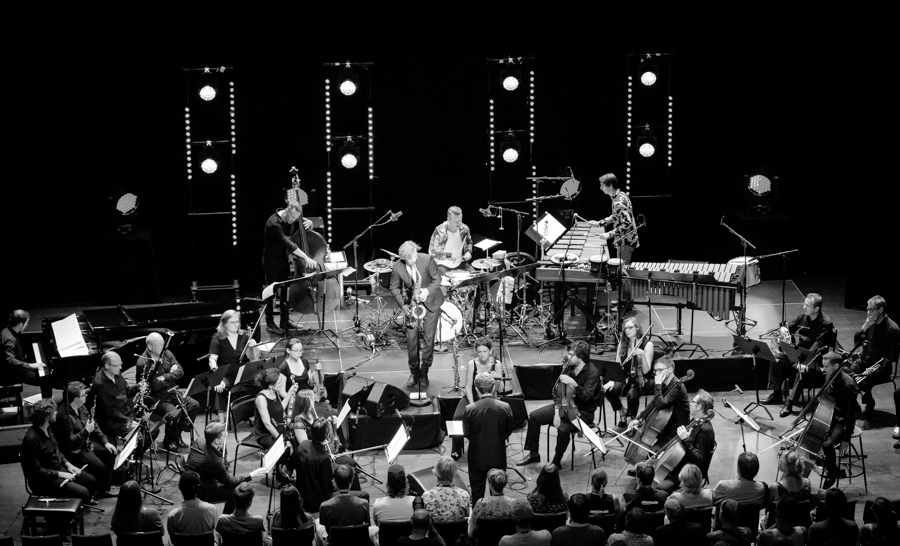
London Sinfonietta at the 2018 Kongsberg Jazzfestival

The London Sinfonietta is an English contemporary chamber orchestra founded in 1968 and based in London.

The ensemble has headquarters at Theatro Technis and is Resident Orchestra at the Southbank Centre and Artistic Associate at Kings Place. Since its inaugural concert in 1968—giving the world premiere of Sir John Tavener’s The Whale—the London Sinfonietta's commitment to making new music has seen it commission over 300 works, and premiere many hundreds more.

The core of the London Sinfonietta is its 18 Principal Players. In September 2013 the ensemble launched its Emerging Artists Programme.

The London Sinfonietta's recordings comprise a catalogue of 20th-century classics, on numerous labels as well as the ensemble's own London Sinfonietta Label.

== Directors ==
David Atherton and Nicholas Snowman founded the orchestra in 1968. Atherton was its first music director, from 1968 to 1973 and again from 1989 to 1991. Snowman was its general manager from 1968 to 1972. Clive Wearing, who joined the Sinfonietta in 1968, was one of its first chorus masters.

Michael Vyner served as the artistic director from 1972 to 1989. Paul Crossley took over and served from 1989 until 1994. Markus Stenz served as music director from 1994 to 1998; he was succeeded by Oliver Knussen from 1998 to 2002. Following 10 years as the ensemble's Education Officer, Gillian Moore became artistic director of the ensemble from 1998 until 2006. Since 2007, Andrew Burke has been the Chief Executive.

== Repertoire and commissions ==
The ensemble has commissioned and performed many works by both emerging and established composers. In its first concert on 24 January 1968 conducted by its co-founder David Atherton, the ensemble premiered John Tavener's The Whale. In 1970 it recorded that work for The Beatles' label Apple Records. Since then, its list of over 300 commissions reaches from its early support of Sir Harrison Birtwistle, Iannis Xenakis and Luciano Berio to pieces from Magnus Lindberg, Thomas Adès, George Benjamin, Steve Reich, Tansy Davies, Dai Fujikura, Jonny Greenwood, Django Bates, Roberto Carnevale, Kenneth Hesketh and Mark-Anthony Turnage. In more recent years the ensemble has continued its commissioning relationship with a diverse range of composers including Birtwistle, Colin Matthews and Steve Reich, while giving numerous opportunities to early career composers such as Martin Suckling, Luke Bedford, Edmund Finnis and Elspeth Brooke through concert commissions and cross-art form development programmes.

In its early years, the ensemble also included classical music in its programming, before its focus moved mainly to music of the latter 20th century. In the early 2000s the ensemble's programming embraced collaborations with pop and electronica artists as it sought to connect the sound-worlds across different genres of contemporary music. Most recently, the ensemble has again updated its focus, placing a priority on music of the 21st century and its connections with other art forms. In recent years its commissions have included works by Gerald Barry, Bryn Harrison and Michel van der Aa; it has worked and recorded with experimental musicians such as Mica Levi and Matthew Herbert, and produced collaborations with contemporary artists such as Martin Creed and Christian Marclay.

The London Sinfonietta has worked with a range of conductors, not least its past music directors David Atherton, Markus Stenz and Oliver Knussen. It has had long-standing relationships with Sir Simon Rattle (in his early career), Elgar Howarth, Diego Masson, George Benjamin and Martyn Brabbins. It now appears regularly with Thierry Fischer, Sian Edwards, Baldur Bronnimann and André de Ridder.

== Residence and festivals ==
The Sinfonietta is a resident ensemble of the Southbank Centre, where it performs much of its London season producing events in the Royal Festival and Queen Elizabeth Halls and the Purcell Room. Since August 2008 the ensemble's headquarters have been at the new Kings Place complex in Kings Cross, London, also home to the Orchestra of the Age of Enlightenment and The Guardian newspaper. It has performed concerts at the venue since October 2008; it also regularly performs at the BBC Proms. Its concerts in London are complemented by a national and international touring schedule. International visits include the Time of Music festival in Finland, 2023.

== Recording ==
The Sinfonietta's acclaimed discography includes seminal recordings of many 20th-century classics, including the premiere recording of Hans Werner Henze's song cycle Voices under the baton of the composer. The ensemble was featured on EMI's 1988 3-CD authentic recording of Kern and Hammerstein's Show Boat. It made a 1991 recording of Górecki's Third Symphony for Nonesuch which sold over 700,000 copies in its first two years of release. The ensemble's discography has recently been expanded by releases on the London Sinfonietta Label, focussing on live performances of otherwise unavailable repertoire. These CDs include 50th birthday tributes to Oliver Knussen, and Toru Takemitsu’s Arc and Green. Between 2006 and 2009, the London Sinfonietta Label—in conjunction with the Jerwood Foundation and NMC Recordings—released the Jerwood Series of six CDs featuring London Sinfonietta players' performances of new compositions by young composers, which include Richard Causton, Dai Fujikura, Ian Vine and Larry Goves. In 2006 a collaboration with Warp Records, featuring recordings of the music of Warp Records artists such as Aphex Twin, as well as modern classical music composers such as John Cage, was released as Warp Works & Twentieth Century Masters.

The ensemble now releases recordings in partnership with different labels, which recently have included Thomas Adès' In Seven Days and Louis Andriessen's Anais Nin (on Signum), music by Pelle Gudmundsen-Holmgreen (on Da Capo) and a collaboration with Mica Levi, Chopped and Screwed (on Rough Trade).

== Discography ==
- Jerome Kern: Show Boat, conducted by John McGlinn, EMI, 1988
