= Mother Thekla =

Mother Thekla (born Marina Sharf) (18 July 1918 – 7 August 2011), was a teacher, a nun and founder of the Orthodox Monastery of the Assumption in North Yorkshire, and spiritual muse of the composer Sir John Tavener.

== Early life ==
Marina Sharf was born on 18 July 1918, to Vladimir and Alice Sharf (née Volkenstein) in Kislovodsk, a spa town in the North Caucasus. She was born during the revolution in Russia, the day after Nicolas II and the royal family were murdered. Her family escaped to England and lived in Richmond, Surrey. Her older brother, Andrew Sharf, was a historian specialising in Byzantium. He moved to Israel with his wife, Eva, a painter, and his mother. Andrew became professor of history at Bar Ilan University.

== Education and career ==
Marina Sharf was educated at City of London School for Girls, and graduated from Cambridge University with a degree in English and Russian. During the war she worked in Bletchley Park. She then worked for the Ministry of Education and was Head of English at Kettering Girls High School. One of her students wrote after her death "Miss Marina Sharf was our English teacher and sometime form mistress at Kettering High School. Hundreds of young women are indebted to her for the inspiring quality of her teaching, especially of Shakespeare, which was one of her great joys."

She took the name Thekla after Thecla, a reported disciple and companion of the Apostle Paul in 1st century, and a saint of the early Christian Church. St. Thecla is given the title "Equal to the Apostles", as in church tradition she accompanied Paul in founding churches, with her witness converting many others to Christianity. She is traditionally held as the first woman martyr for the Christian faith.

== Monastic life ==
Mother Thekla first came in contact with Mother Maria (Lydia Gysi) on the Feast of the Assumption in 1965, at which time Mother Maria was living as an Orthodox nun with the Anglican Community of St. Mary's Abbey at West Malling in Kent. With the help of the Abbey, a house was found for Mother Maria and Sister Thekla at Filgrave, where they settled as 'Spiritual Mother and disciple, living a life of near silence, with day and (often) night being given over 'to the work of the heart and of the mind'. They were then joined by Sister Katharine.

Shortly before the Monastery moved from the Filgrave to the North York Moors, Sister Thekla (as she was then) wrote about how the Orthodox Monastic Vocation had been put into practice in Buckinghamshire. The Sisterhood consisted of "three women, all British by nationality: one born Swiss, one born Russian, and one born English; all three nuns in the Ecumenical Patriarchate of Constantinople!" Referring to the monastic tradition, Mother Thekla wrote: "I can only tell what I was taught in the stillness of those years". She is referring to her early years with Mother Maria. "I was taught the meaning and work of repentance, that is, the growing into the attitude – in spite of every lapse until death – which recognises the failure within oneself, not even as much in the sin committed, as in the very being. I was trained even ruthlessly in the recognition of the sin of double ignorance; and I was taught the joy, which nothing can shake, of the acknowledgement of the limitation of human reasoning; and, hence, the glad freedom of the mind which can work to the uttermost of its own limits without fear of trespassing into the Divine."

However, the encroachment of Milton Keynes meant that the small Community at Filgrave felt that they needed to move, which they did in 1974, choosing a farmhouse on the North Yorkshire Moors in which to establish themselves. There, their work of prayer, study and manual work continued.

== Links to Sir John Tavener ==
In the obituary in Gramophone Magazine she was described as "a librettist, counsellor, 'spiritual mother' and even commercial adviser". As a leading theologian and religious thinker, she strongly influenced the great British composer, John Tavener, who converted to Orthodoxy from Presbyterianism. He was greatly influenced by her book The Life of St Mary of Egypt (1974) and this provided the plot for his second opera, Mary of Egypt (1992).

She acted as his counsellor and spiritual advisor in the years after the death of his mother in 1985. She helped him to deal with the concern that he would not be able to compose original works again. It has also been said that she advised him to be more commercial. As a result, he wrote The Protecting Veil (1987), which was extremely popular. She also provided libretti for a series of important works including Song for Athene (1993) which was part of the funeral of Diana, Princess of Wales, The Apocalypse (1993), Fall And Resurrection (1999), We Shall See Him As He Is (1993), and Let Us Begin Again (1995), inter alia.

He wrote he could not have worked so well with another librettist: "It's one of those very special relationships in life, which will not ever happen again." He dedicated The Music Of Silence: A Composer's Testament (1999) to her. She had "helped me put my music and my life together".

== Final years ==
"In her final years at the Infirmary of the Order of the Holy Paraclete in Whitby she saw many visitors and old friends. She was cared for by a team who loved her and teased just as much as she did them."
