= The Lamb (Tavener) =

Choral work by John Tavener

- Choral music by John Tavener
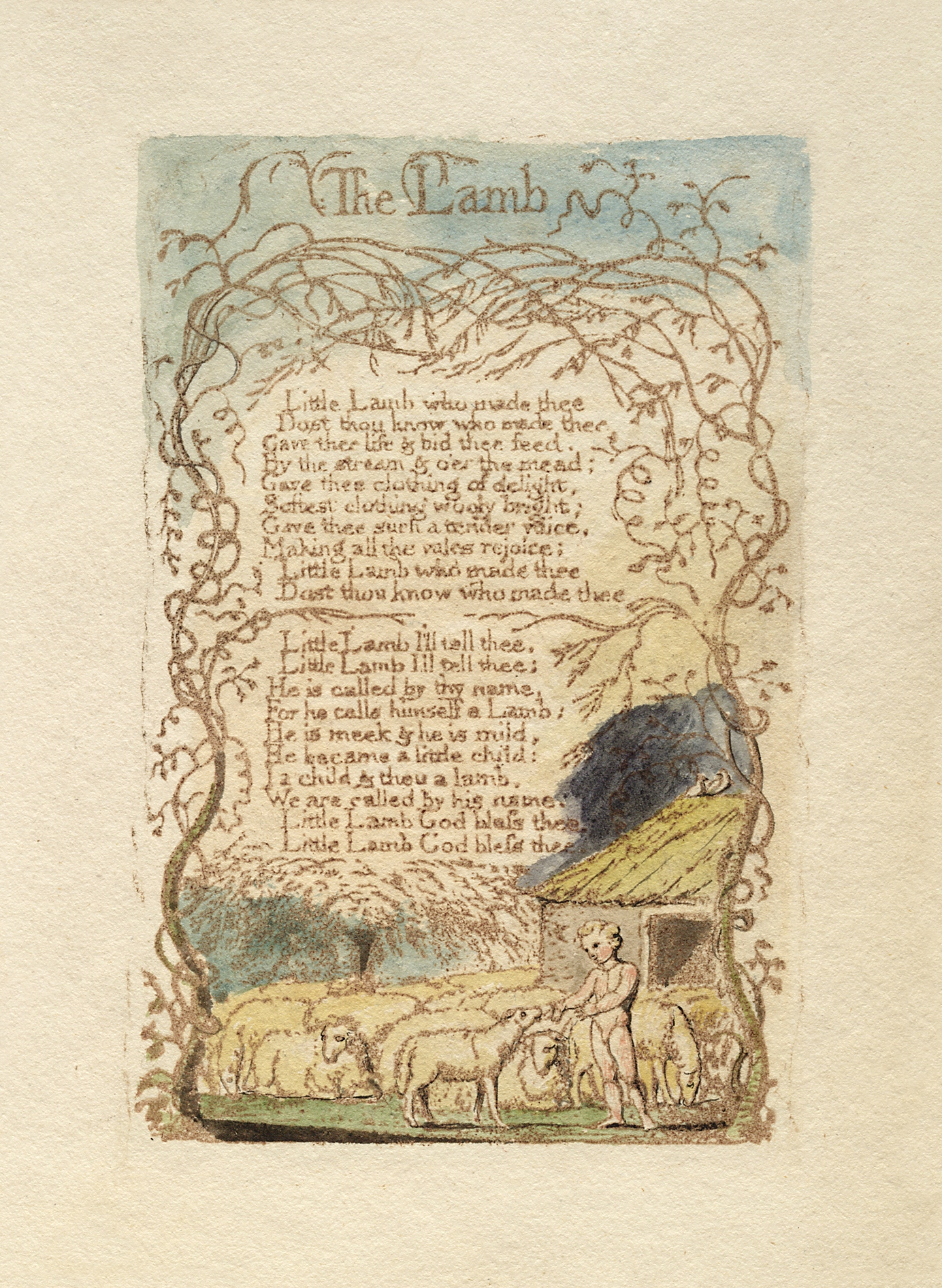
- "The Lamb" in William Blake's Songs of Innocence and of Experience (1794), illustrated by Blake
- Genre: Choral anthem
- Occasion: Third birthday of Tavener's nephew
- Text: "The Lamb" by William Blake
- Composed: 1982
- Publisher: Chester Music
- Scoring: SATB choir

Premiere
- Date: 22 December 1982
- Location: Winchester Cathedral

The Lamb is a choral work written in 1982 by British composer John Tavener (1944–2013). It is a setting of music to the William Blake poem "The Lamb" from Blake's collection of poems Songs of Innocence and of Experience (1789). It is one of Tavener's best known works. Written for unaccompanied SATB choir, the music is minimalistic and combines chromaticism with more conventional harmony.

The Lamb was premiered in Winchester Cathedral on 22 December 1982. It was also performed at the Festival of Nine Lessons and Carols in Kings College Chapel, Cambridge, on Christmas Eve of the same year. This gave the piece widespread exposure, and it has since become a common part of church services, especially around Christmas. The Lamb featured in the soundtrack for Paolo Sorrentino's film The Great Beauty and has been a set work for the Edexcel A level music examination.

== History ==
John Tavener was a composer of religious works. His early education centred around avant-garde techniques, but his musical language developed into a more minimalistic style. Tavener often composed pieces of music for family and friends, one of which was The Lamb. It was written in 1982 as a birthday present for his three-year-old nephew, Simon, without the intention of commercial success. He wrote the piece during a car journey from South Devon to London. Tavener said that the work came to him "fully grown so to speak, all I had to do was to write it down". He completed the piece within 15 minutes. The composition sets the text of William Blake's poem "The Lamb" to music for choir.

After finishing the composition, Tavener sent the piece to his publisher Chester Music and asked if they could share it with King's College, Cambridge, for inclusion in their Nine Lessons and Carols service that year. Upon seeing the piece, Stephen Cleobury—the Director of Music at King's College—decided it would be included. The premiere of The Lamb took place in Winchester Cathedral on 22 December 1982, and on Christmas Eve two days later it was performed in the Nine Lessons and Carols service.

== Text ==
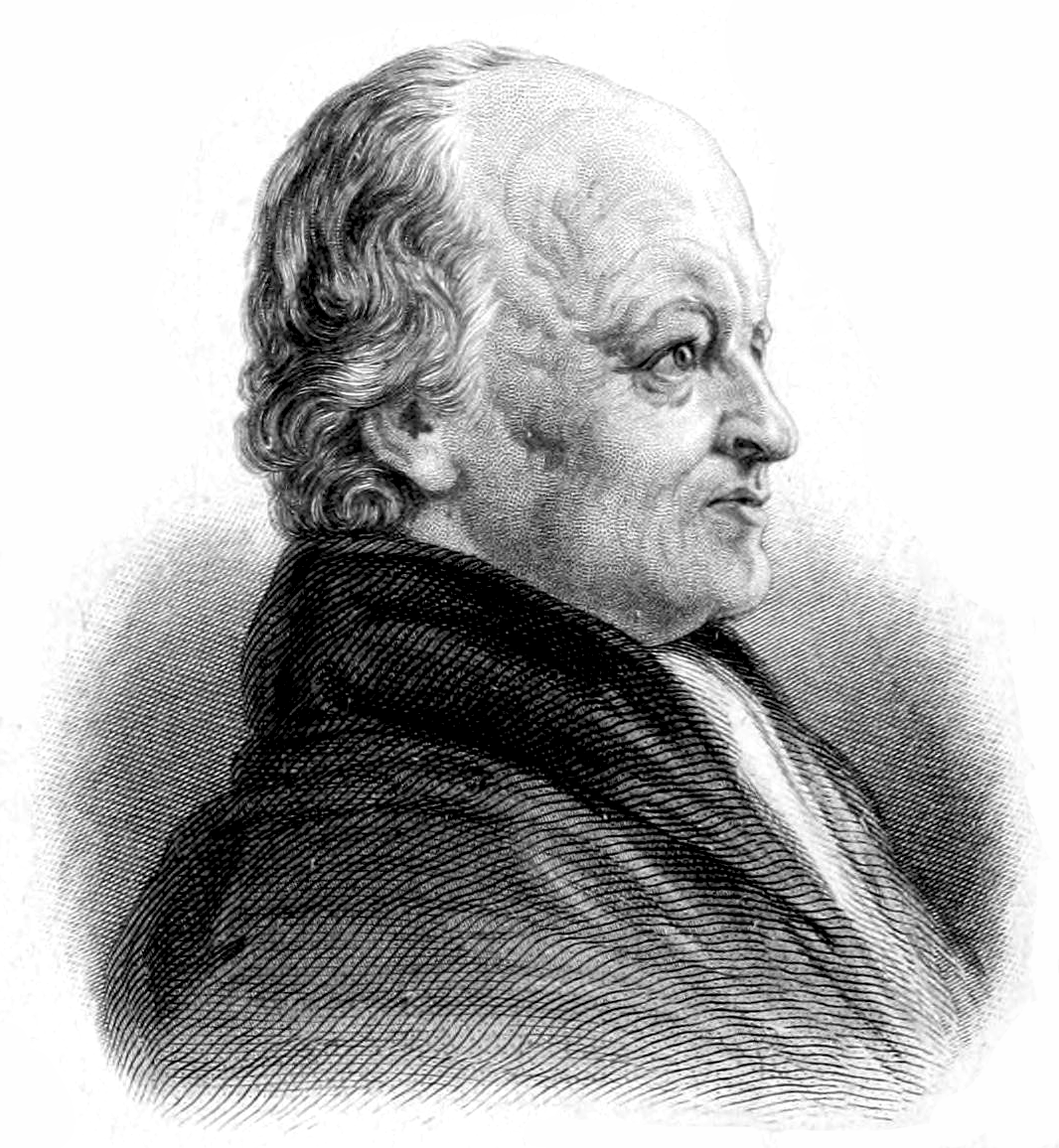
William Blake's "The Lamb" is part of his poetry collection Songs of Innocence and Experience, first published in 1789.

"The Lamb" is a poem by William Blake from his poetry collection Songs of Innocence and Experience (1789). The poem draws on religious symbolism, primarily the Agnus Dei and the concept of Jesus as the Lamb of God. Blake believed that Jesus and God were two different but related entities, and this duality is depicted in the poem: the text highlights various binaries, including the contrast between youthful innocence and older age, and the pairing of lamb the animal with the Lamb of God. Blake himself set the poem to music, but no known copies have survived. Inspired by 'The Lamb' while reading Blake's poetry, Tavener said "I read the words, and immediately I heard the notes."

== Composition ==
The Lamb is written for unaccompanied SATB choir. The choral writing is homophonic throughout, with largely syllabic word-setting. A performance direction instructs the singers to be "flexible" and "always guided by the words". The melody largely consists of quavers at ♩=40.

The piece combines simple harmony with dissonance. It is a minimalist piece based on variations of a single motif: the music in bars 1-2 is expanded upon and used throughout the rest of the piece, demonstrating Tavener's interest in serialism. In the first bar, a tonally-ambiguous melody in either G major or E minor is sung by the sopranos. The altos enter in the second bar with an exact inversion (or mirror image) of the soprano's melody in bar 1. This inversion results in unconventional harmony: interlocking melodic lines, chromatic harmony, and bitonality between E-flat major and G major. The soprano line in bar 3 utilises notes from the alto and soprano parts from the previous two bars. Bar 4 is a retrograde of bar 3, and the final bars of the A section (bars 5-6) also consist of notes from the previous melody. Bars 7-10 are a B section in E minor and feature all voices singing homophonically in more conventional aeolian harmony. The texture in the B section is similar to a chorale.

The chordal verses of The Lamb feature a musical device which Tavener called the "joy-sorrow chord", sung on the word "Lamb". The chord is used in other pieces by Tavener, including Funeral Ikos and Ikon of Light. From the bass upwards, it consists of the notes A-C-G-B:

== Legacy ==
Since its first performances in 1982, The Lamb has been a popular piece of church music. It is one of Tavener's most commonly-performed pieces, and is often sung in Christmas services due to the text's focus on Jesus as a baby. Music presenter and journalist Tom Service wrote that The Lamb is "music that's once heard, never forgotten, its delicate radiance realising a rapt timelessness". As well as being a popular piece sung throughout the Christmas season, it has been used in a phone commercial and in the soundtrack to the film The Great Beauty. The Lamb has been a set work for the Edexcel A level music examination.
