= Holst Singers =

Background information
- Origin: London, England
- Genres: Choral
- Occupation: Choir
- Years active: 1978–present
- Members: Conductor; Stephen Layton
- Website: www.holstsingers.com

The Holst Singers are an amateur choir based in London, England. The choir is named indirectly after the English composer Gustav Holst, taking its name from the Holst Room at St Paul's Girls' School, the venue for rehearsals during the choir's early years.

The musical director is the English conductor Stephen Layton. The countertenor James Bowman was the president of the choir.

== Repertoire ==
The Holst Singers devote much of their attention to performing and recording new works by living composers such as the British composer John Tavener, and Estonian composers Arvo Pärt and Veljo Tormis. The choir also focuses on works by Alexander Gretchaninov, Alfred Schnittke, and Russian Orthodox music, as well as the core choral repertoire of part-songs by Gustav Holst, Ralph Vaughan Williams and Benjamin Britten, and works such as Bach's Mass in B minor and Spem in alium by Thomas Tallis.

== Performances ==
The Holst Singers perform regularly in London venues such as the Temple Church and St John's Smith Square. In June 2003 the Holst singers premièred Tavener's epic 8-hour work, The Veil of the Temple at the Temple Church. They performed an abridged concert version in the BBC Proms in 2004. The choir has previously performed with the Hilliard Ensemble, The Academy of Ancient Music and soloists such as James Bowman and Ian Bostridge.

== Reception ==
Critical assessment of the Holst Singers' output has generally been favourable, with recent recitals commended by British newspapers such as the Guardian and the Daily Telegraph. Holst Singers recordings have also been given positive reviews by critics in publications such as the Times, Gramophone, and on CD Review (BBC Radio 3).

== Discography ==
The Holst Singers have made a number of recordings with Hyperion Records as well as with RCA and Decca. CD releases include The Tavener Collection (Decca), Schnittke's Choir Concerto (Hyperion), Gretchaninov's Vespers, settings of Three Shakespeare Songs and English folk songs by Vaughan Williams, and music by Pärt, Sviridov, Górecki and Tchaikovsky.

=== Selected discography ===
Ikon II (sequel release to the 1997 Ikon CD)

- Released: October 2010
- Format: CD
- Label: Hyperion
- Writer: Pyotr Ilyich Tchaikovsky, Alexander Gretchaninov, Nikolai Golovanov, Pavel Chesnokov, Konstantin Shvedov, Viktor Kalinnikov, Nikolai Rimsky-Korsakov, Sergei Rachmaninov, Mili Balakirev, Alexander Dmitriyevich Kastalsky, César Cui
- Director: Stephen Layton
- Tracks: various pieces of Russian Orthodox choral music

Tormis – Choral Music

- Released: April 2008
- Format: CD
- Label: Hyperion
- Writer: Veljo Tormis
- Director: Stephen Layton
- Tracks: various Estonian folk songs arranged for choir

Pierre Villette Choral Music

- Released: April 2006
- Format: CD
- Label: Hyperion
- Writer: Pierre Villette
- Director: Stephen Layton
- Tracks: fifteen unaccompanied choral works and two motets

The Veil of the Temple (world première recording)

- Released: February 2005
- Format: double CD
- Label: RCA
- Writer: John Tavener
- Director: Stephen Layton

Ikon

- Released: October 1999
- Format: CD
- Label: Hyperion
- Writer: Pyotr Ilyich Tchaikovsky, Alexander Gretchaninov, Georgy Sviridov, Henryk Górecki, Arvo Pärt, Knut Nystedt
- Director: Stephen Layton
- Tracks: various pieces of Russian Orthodox choral music
