= Paul Brough (conductor) =

English conductor and teacher

- Born: 15 July 1963 (age 63); London, United Kingdom
- Genres: Choral music
- Occupation: Choirmaster
- Years active: 1980s-

Paul Brough (born 15 July 1963 in London) is a retired English music teacher, church musician, choirmaster and orchestral conductor. His final appointments were as a professor at the Royal Academy of Music (2004–2022), and Director of Music at both St Mary's, Bourne Street (2015–2022) and Keble College, Oxford (2020–2022).

He guest-conducted regularly, most notably over fifteen years with the BBC Singers (Principal Guest Conductor 2011–2016; over 60 broadcasts of choral music from all over the world spanning seven centuries) and the BBC Symphony Orchestra, BBC Philharmonic, BBC Concert Orchestra, Royal Philharmonic Orchestra, Ulster Orchestra, Britten Sinfonia, City of London Sinfonia, Manchester Camerata, St James' Baroque and Instruments of Time and Truth. He conducted The Hanover Band (Principal Conductor 2007–10) for seven consecutive seasons in a repertoire of Handel, JS Bach, Gluck, Haydn, Mozart, Beethoven, Weber, Rossini and Mendelssohn, on period instruments. For the Royal Academy of Music he conducted "Dr Haydn's Inexhaustible Genius-Box" (2013), and Mahler's Symphony no.2 by invitation of the Students' Association. His recordings include Britten with the BBC Concert Orchestra, Richard Rodney Bennett and Arvo Part with the BBC Singers, and Mozart and the Haydn brothers with Keble College Choir.

He directed and developed the music at Tewkesbury Abbey (Abbey School Choir 1986–1989, now known as the Schola Cantorum), Sheffield Cathedral (1991–1994) and All Saints, Margaret Street (2004–2013). He also served by invitation as Guest Chorus Master at English National Opera (2013), Guest Principal Conductor of the Oxford Bach Choir (2016), Acting Organist of New College, Oxford (2017), and Acting Precentor of Gonville and Caius College, Cambridge (2019–2020). He assisted the late Martindale Sidwell with the music at Hampstead Parish Church and the RAF Church of St Clement Danes (1989–1991), and the late Sir Jeffrey Tate with Wagner's Ring cycle at La Fenice, Venice (2007–2009).

He trained as a pianist, singer and percussionist, attending Portsmouth Grammar School (1971–1973), Dulwich College (1973–1981) and the Royal College of Music (1981–1983). He held organ scholarships at St Michael's College, Tenbury (1982–1983) and Magdalen College, Oxford (1983–1986), subsequently studying conducting at the Royal Academy of Music (1994–1997) where he held the Meaker Fellowship (1997–1998). In addition to his 18 years as a professor at the RAM he was for 16 years Assistant Lecturer in Music at King's College London (1994–1999, and 2002–2013). From 1999 to 2007 he taught in the music department of Roedean School (Director of Music 1999–2002).

His was honoured to be given permanent membership of Gonville and Caius College, Cambridge (2020) and the Associateship of the Royal Academy of Music (2007) for "a significant contribution to the music profession or society in general". (Quotation source www.ram.ac.uk/about-us (honours))

On the evening of Thursday 18 December 2008, BBC Radio 3 broadcast a live performance of Britten's "St Nicolas", given by the BBC Singers and the BBC Concert Orchestra conducted by Paul Brough, with the Choristers of St Paul's Cathedral under the direction of Andrew Carwood. The tenor soloist was Daniel Norman. The performance was given at Lancing College Chapel in Sussex, marking the 60th anniversary of the work's premiere there, conducted by the composer with the tenor soloist Peter Pears. The 2008 performance was telecast on BBC4 and made into a BBC Music Magazine Collection CD (Volume 18 no.4).

On Tuesday 1 November 2016 at 7.30pm, BBC Radio 3 in Concert broadcast a performance of JS Bach's Mass in B minor, given by the BBC Singers and St James' Baroque conducted by Paul Brough. The soloists were Susanna Hurrell (soprano), Jennifer Johnston (mezzo-soprano), Charles Daniels (tenor) and Mark Stone (bass). The performance was given at Milton Court Concert Hall, Barbican, London on Friday 21 October 2016.

His compositions of devotional music enjoy widespread liturgical use, particularly the Hymns for Benediction (2004) and "Who is like you, O Lord our God", written for and recorded by the Choir of St Bartholomew the Great, West Smithfield.
