= David Atherton =

English conductor

David Atherton OBE (born 3 January 1944) is an English conductor and founder of the London Sinfonietta.

== Background ==
Atherton was born in Blackpool, Lancashire, into a musical family. His father, Robert Atherton, was the Music Master at St Joseph's College, Blackpool and was also a conductor. His mother was a singer. Atherton was educated at Blackpool Grammar School, and studied music at Fitzwilliam College, Cambridge.

== Career ==
In 1967 Atherton was founder of the London Sinfonietta and, as its music director, a position he held until 1973, gave the first performance of many important contemporary works. It is now widely regarded as one of the world's leading chamber orchestras. Also in 1967 he was invited to join the music staff of the Royal Opera House, Covent Garden, by Sir Georg Solti. In 1968 he became the youngest conductor ever to appear there, conducting Il trovatore. He spent twelve years as resident conductor, giving over 150 performances. Also in 1968 he was the youngest conductor in the history of the BBC Proms and subsequently appeared in thirty consecutive seasons.

In 1976 he conducted for the first time at La Scala in Milan, Italy. In 1978 he conducted at the War Memorial Opera House in San Francisco, California. Then in 1980 he was appointed music director of the San Diego Symphony, a post he held until 1987 and principal conductor of the Royal Liverpool Philharmonic. In 1989 he founded the Mainly Mozart Festival in San Diego and was appointed music director of the Hong Kong Philharmonic Orchestra, a post he held until 2000.

In recognition of his services to the music of Hong Kong, he was appointed an Officer of the Order of the British Empire and awarded the title of Conductor Laureate of the orchestra.

He has also been the principal guest conductor of the BBC National Orchestra of Wales and the BBC Symphony Orchestra. He has also devised and conducted festivals in London featuring the complete works of Maurice Ravel, Igor Stravinsky, Anton Webern and Edgard Varèse with the London Sinfonietta, London Symphony Orchestra, BBC Symphony Orchestra and the Royal Opera House.

He has also appeared with the English National Opera, Canadian Opera Company and Glyndebourne Festival Opera, as well as the Metropolitan Opera in New York City, to which he returns regularly. He also returns to California each summer to direct the Mainly Mozart Festival.

He has opened the Prague Spring International Music Festival and the Berliner Festspiele with the Berlin Philharmonic, and travels widely, in particular to the United States where he regularly visits many of the leading North American orchestras.

== Recorded work and awards ==
He has made a number of recordings with the London Sinfonietta, which he co-founded. His work in the recording studio has gained a number of awards as well as a number of Grammy Award nominations. His first award came in 1971 when he won the Conductor of the Year Award from the Composers' Guild of Great Britain (now the British Academy of Songwriters, Composers and Authors). In 1973 he won the oldest and most prestigious Dutch Music Prize, the Edison Award. He won the premier French award for musical recordings, the Grand Prix du Disque in 1977 and the Koussevitzky Award in 1981. The following year he won the Prix Caecilia and his recording of Michael Tippett's opera King Priam won the International Record Critics' Award, generally regarded as the world's top recording prize. Tippett wrote in his autobiography, "Some artists will show insight into my vision: an example would be David Atherton's conducting... But then, Atherton is a conductor of genius."

== Television ==
Atherton was the conductor in a performance of Michael Tippett's The Midsummer Marriage in 1984 for Thames Television.

In 1988 he was the conductor in a performance of Benjamin Britten's opera Billy Budd for the BBC and in 1995 he was the conductor in the English National Opera performance of Britten's opera Peter Grimes for the BBC.

== Personal life and family ==
Atherton married Ann Gianetta Drake in 1970, with whom he had three children, two daughters and a son. The couple separated in 1983. In 2012, he married his companion of 27 years, violinist Eleanor Ann Roth.

His sister Joan is a freelance violinist who has held the position of Principal Second Violin with the London Sinfonietta since 1970.

His eldest daughter Elizabeth is an opera singer.

Cultural offices
Preceded by Peter Erős	Music Director, San Diego Symphony; 1980-1987	Succeeded by Yoav Talmi
