= John Tavener =

English composer (1944–2013)

Sir John Tavener
- Tavener in 2005

Background information
- Born: John Kenneth Tavener; January 28, 1944; Wembley, London
- Died: November 12, 2013 (aged 69) Child Okeford, Dorset
- Genres: Choral music; Religious music
- Awards: Ivor Novello Award; Honorary fellow of Sarum College

Sir John Kenneth Tavener (28 January 1944 – 12 November 2013) was an English composer of choral religious works. Among his works are The Lamb (1982), The Protecting Veil (1988), and Song for Athene (1993).

Tavener first came to prominence with his cantata The Whale, premiered in 1968. Then aged 24, he was described by The Guardian as "the musical discovery of the year", while The Times said he was "among the very best creative talents of his generation". During his career he became one of the best known and popular composers of his generation, most particularly for The Protecting Veil, which as recorded by cellist Steven Isserlis became a best-selling album, and Song for Athene which was sung at the funeral of Princess Diana. The Lamb featured in the soundtrack for Paolo Sorrentino's film The Great Beauty. Tavener wrote the composition A New Beginning to commemorate the Millennium celebrations on New Year's Eve, 1999, during the opening of the Millennium Dome in London. Tavener was knighted in 2000 for his services to music and won an Ivor Novello Award, and was awarded an Honorary Fellowship by Sarum College in 2001.

== Early life and education ==
Tavener was born on 28 January 1944 in Wembley, London. His parents ran a family building firm and his father was also an organist at St Andrew's Presbyterian Church in Frognal, Hampstead. At the age of 12, Tavener was taken to Glyndebourne to hear Mozart's The Magic Flute, a work he loved for the rest of his life. That same year he heard Stravinsky's most recent work, Canticum Sacrum, which he later described as "the piece that woke me up and made me want to be a composer".

Tavener became a music scholar at Highgate School (where a fellow pupil was John Rutter). The school choir was often employed by the BBC in works requiring boys' voices, so Tavener gained choral experience singing in Mahler's Third Symphony and Orff's Carmina Burana. He started to compose at Highgate, and also became a sufficiently proficient pianist to perform the second and third movements of Beethoven's Fourth Piano Concerto and, in 1961 with the National Youth Orchestra, Shostakovich's Piano Concerto No. 2. He also became organist and choirmaster in 1961 at St John's Presbyterian Church, Kensington (now St Mark's Coptic Orthodox Church), a post he held for 14 years.

Tavener entered the Royal Academy of Music in 1962, where his tutors included Sir Lennox Berkeley. During his studies there he decided to give up the piano and devote himself to composition.

== The Whale and early operas ==
Tavener first came to prominence in 1968 with his dramatic cantata The Whale, based on the Old Testament story of Jonah. It was premièred at the London Sinfonietta's début concert, which was also the opening concert of the Queen Elizabeth Hall. Tavener's younger brother, Roger, was then doing some building work on Ringo Starr's home and, gaining the musician's interest, persuaded the Beatles to have The Whale recorded by Apple Records and released in 1970. The following year Tavener began teaching at Trinity College of Music, London. Other works by Tavener released by Apple included his A Celtic Requiem, which impressed Benjamin Britten enough to persuade Covent Garden to commission an opera from Tavener. The ultimate result, to a libretto by playwright Gerard McLarnon, was Thérèse: when staged in 1979 the opera was thought too static to be a successful drama.

Tavener had also been deeply affected by his brief 1974 marriage to the Greek dancer Victoria Maragopoulou. His chamber opera A Gentle Spirit (1977), with a libretto by McLarnon based on a story by Fyodor Dostoyevsky, concerns a pawnbroker whose marriage fails to the extent that his wife commits suicide. It has been deemed "far superior to Thérèse, with the internal drama more suited to the stage". Significantly, it also touched on Russian Orthodoxy, to which McLarnon had been a convert for several years.

== Conversion to Orthodox Christianity ==
Tavener converted to the Orthodox Church in 1977. Orthodox theology and liturgical traditions became a major influence on his work. He was particularly drawn to its mysticism, studying and setting to music the writings of Church Fathers and completing a setting of the Divine Liturgy of St. John Chrysostom, the principal eucharistic liturgy of the Orthodox Church: this was Tavener's first directly Orthodox-inspired music.

== Later career ==
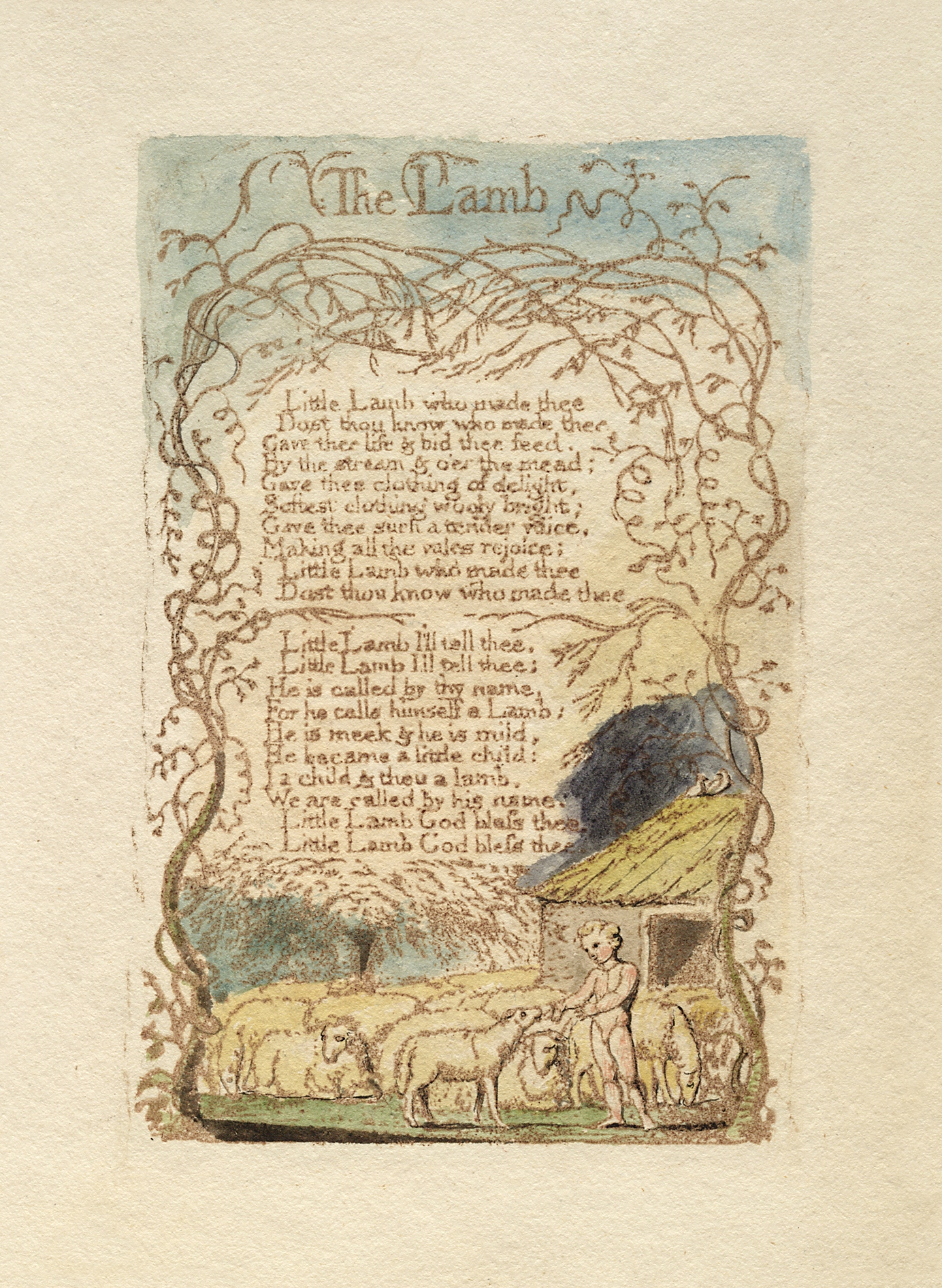
John Tavener's choral arrangement of William Blake's "The Lamb" from his collection Songs of Innocence and of Experience is a continually popular work. This image represents copy C, object 8 of that original poem, currently held by the Library of Congress.

Tavener's subsequent explorations of Russian and Greek culture resulted in Akhmatova Requiem: this failed to enjoy success either at its Edinburgh Festival premiere in 1981, or at its Proms' performance the following week where many of the audience left before it finished. Of more lasting success was Tavener's short unaccompanied four-part choral setting of William Blake's poem "The Lamb", written one afternoon in 1982 for his nephew Simon's third birthday. This simple homophonic piece is usually performed as a Christmas carol. Later prominent works include The Akathist of Thanksgiving of 1987, written in celebration of the millennium of the Russian Orthodox Church; The Protecting Veil, first performed by cellist Steven Isserlis and the London Symphony Orchestra at the 1989 Proms; and Song for Athene (1993). The two choral works were settings of texts by Mother Thekla, a Russian Orthodox abbess who was Tavener's long-time spiritual adviser until her death in 2011. Song for Athene in particular gained worldwide exposure when performed at the funeral of Diana, Princess of Wales in 1997.

Tavener's Fall and Resurrection, first performed in 2000, used instruments such as ram's horn, Ney flute and kaval. It was dedicated to the then Prince of Wales, with whom Tavener formed a lasting friendship. His work Ikon of Eros (2003) was commissioned for violinist Jorja Fleezanis, then concertmaster of the Minnesota Orchestra, with vocal soloists and the Minnesota Chorale and recorded at the Cathedral of St. Paul, conducted by Paul Goodwin. Also in 2003 Tavener composed the exceptionally large work The Veil of the Temple (which was premièred at the Temple Church, London), based on texts from a number of religions. Identified by Tavener as "the supreme achievement of my life", it is set for four choirs, several orchestras and soloists and lasts at least seven hours. Prayer of the Heart, written for and performed by Björk, was premiered in 2004. In 2007 Tavener composed The Beautiful Names, a setting of the 99 names of God in the Muslim tradition, sung in Arabic.

It had been reported, particularly in the British press, that Tavener left Orthodox Christianity to explore a number of other different religious traditions, including Hinduism and Islam, and became a follower of the Traditionalist philosopher Frithjof Schuon. In an interview with The New York Times, conducted by British music journalist Michael White, Tavener said: "I reached a point where everything I wrote was terribly austere and hidebound by the tonal system of the Orthodox Church, and I felt the need, in my music at least, to become more universalist: to take in other colors, other languages." The interviewer also reported at the time that he "hasn't abandoned Orthodoxy. He remains devotedly Christian." Speaking on the BBC Four television programme Sacred Music in 2010, Tavener described himself as "essentially Orthodox". He reiterated both his desire to explore the musical traditions of other religions, and his adherence to the Orthodox Christian faith, on Start the Week, recorded only days before his death and broadcast on 11 November 2013.

In 2020 Sir David Pountney, former artistic director of the Welsh National Opera, announced that Tavener's final opera, Krishna (which was completed in 2005 but had remained in manuscript form) would be staged by Grange Park Opera. Pountney himself will be directing the production. It will premiere in 2026.

== Personal life ==
In 1974 he married the Greek dancer Victoria Maragopoulou. They were married for eight months. In 1991 he married Maryanna Schaefer with whom he had three children, Theodora, Sofia and Orlando. He had considerable health problems throughout his life. He had a stroke in his thirties, heart surgery and the removal of a tumour in his forties, and had two successive heart attacks which left him frail. He was diagnosed with Marfan syndrome in 1990. Lady Tavener broadcast a charity appeal on BBC Radio 4 in October 2008 on behalf of the Marfan Trust.

Tavener had an interest in classic cars, owning an Armstrong Siddeley Sapphire, a Rolls-Royce Silver Shadow, a Jaguar XJ6 and a white Bentley Mulsanne Turbo. He was also noted for wearing a white suit.

== Death and legacy ==
Tavener died, aged 69, on 12 November 2013 at his home in Child Okeford, Dorset. Among those in the music world who paid tribute were composers John Rutter and Sir Peter Maxwell Davies, cellist Steven Isserlis, Neil Portnow, president of the National Academy of Recording Arts and Sciences, oboist Nicholas Daniel, Roger Wright (controller of BBC Radio 3 and director of the Proms), and soprano Patricia Rozario. A tribute was also received from Charles, Prince of Wales. Tavener's funeral was held at Winchester Cathedral on 28 November 2013. The service was conducted in the Orthodox rite and was presided over by Archbishop Gregorios of Thyateira, representative of the Ecumenical Patriarch and the most senior Orthodox bishop in the UK. About 700 mourners attended.

Rutter describes Tavener as having the "very rare gift" of being able to "bring an audience to a deep silence." According to Isserlis: "He had his own voice. He wasn't writing to be popular – he was writing the music he had to write."

== Musical style ==
Whilst Tavener's earliest compositions were influenced by Igor Stravinsky and Olivier Messiaen—often invoking the sound world of Stravinsky (in particular his Canticum Sacrum), and the ecstatic quality found in various works by Messiaen—his later music became more sparse, using wide registral space and usually diatonically tonal. Too, Tavener recognised Arvo Pärt as "a kindred spirit" and shared with him a common religious tradition and a fondness for textural transparency.

== Career highlights ==
- 1968 – The Whale premiered by the London Sinfonietta and subsequently recorded on the Beatles' Apple label.
- 1971 – A Celtic Requiem recorded by Apple.
- 1973 – Thérèse, the story of Saint Thérèse of Lisieux, commissioned by the Royal Opera, London.
- 4 September 1989 – premiere of The Protecting Veil at the Proms in London.
- 2000 – premiere of Fall and Resurrection in St Paul's Cathedral, London (4 January 2000).
- 2000 – knighthood in the Millennium Honours List.
- 2001 – soundtrack of Werner Herzog's short documentary Pilgrimage composed.
- 2003 – premiere of the all-night vigil The Veil of the Temple by the Holst Singers and the Choir of the Temple Church at the Temple Church, London.
- 2005 – premiere of Laila (Amu), Tavener's first dance collaboration, with Random Dance company and Wayne McGregor's choreography.
- 2006 – contributed Fragments of a Prayer to the Alfonso Cuarón film Children of Men.
- 2007 – premiere of The Beautiful Names by the BBC Symphony Chorus and Orchestra at Westminster Cathedral. The work, sung in Arabic, is a setting of the 99 names of Allah found in the Qur'an. Awarded honorary degree by the University of Winchester.
- 2008 – premiere of the anthem sung in St Paul's Cathedral in the presence of Queen Elizabeth II and the Duke of Edinburgh.
- March 2009 – premiere of Tu ne sais pas for mezzo-soprano, timpani and strings. The Chamber Orchestra of Philadelphia, and Katherine Pracht singing texts drawn from poems by French poet Jean Biès (one of the work's dedicatees) and from Islamic and Hindu sources.
- 2011 – excerpts of Funeral Canticle from the album Eternity's Sunrise by the Academy of Ancient Music were used multiple times in Terrence Malick's film The Tree of Life.
- April 2013 – premieres of Tolstoy's Creed and Three Hymns of George Herbert by The City Choir of Washington at the Washington National Cathedral.
- 7 July 2013 – premieres of Love Duet from The Play of Krishna, If Ye Love Me and The Death of Ivan Ilyich during an all-Tavener concert given as part of the Manchester International Festival.
- 2013 – The Lamb included in the critically acclaimed soundtrack to Paolo Sorrentino's film The Great Beauty (Italy's official selection for the 2013 Academy Awards), which subsequently won.

== Works ==
- Setting of the Credo (1961)
- Genesis (1962)
- Three Holy Sonnets of John Donne (1962; song cycle)
- The Cappemakers (1964; one-act opera)
- Cain and Abel (1965; cantata)
- The Whale (1965–66; soloists, speaker, SATB choir, children's choir, orchestra)
- In alium (1968)
- A Celtic Requiem (1969; soprano solo, SATB choir, children's choir, ensemble)
- In memoriam Igor Stravinsky (1971)
- Responsorium in Memory of Annon Lee Silver (1971)
- Últimos ritos (1972)
- Canciones españolas (1972)
- Requiem for Father Malachy (1973)
- Thérèse (1973–76; opera)
- Canticle of the Mother of God (1976)
- Liturgy of St John Chrysostom (1977)
- A Gentle Spirit (1977; chamber opera)
- Kyklike Kinesis (1977)
- The Immurement of Antigone (1978)
- Palintropos (1978)
- Akhmatova: Requiem (1979–80)
- Sappho: Lyrical Fragments (1980; song cycle)
- Funeral Ikos (1981)
- The Great Canon of St Andrew of Crete (1981)
- Trisagion (1981; brass ensemble)
- Mandelion (1981; organ)
- The Lamb (1982)
- Towards the Son (1982)
- To a Child Dancing in the Wind (1983)
- Ikon of Light (1984; choir, string trio)
- Vigil Service (1984)
- Sixteen Haiku of Seferis (1984)
- A Mini Song Cycle for Gina (1984)
- Love bade me welcome (1985)
- Magnificat and Nunc dimittis (1986)
- Eis thanaton (1986; cantata)
- Akathist of Thanksgiving (1986–87)
- The Protecting Veil (1987; cello, strings)
- The Tyger (1987)
- Resurrection (1989)
- The Hidden Treasure (1989)
- Psalm 121 (1989)
- Thunder Entered Her (1990; SATB choir, handbells and organ)
- The Repentant Thief (1990; clarinet, strings)
- Mary of Egypt (opera; 1991)
- The Last Sleep of the Virgin (1991)
- The Apocalypse (1993)
- Song for Athene (1993; SATB choir)
- Theophany (1993; orchestra)
- Song of the Angel (1994)
- Diodia (1995; orchestra)
- As one who has slept (1996, two SATB choirs)
- Funeral Canticle (1996; orchestra)
- Prayer for the healing of the sick (1998)
- Birthday Sleep (1999; SATB choir)
- A New Beginning (1999)
- The Bridal Chamber (1999; two countertenors, three tenors, baritone, and two basses)
- Fall and Resurrection (2000)
- Lamentations and Praises (2001; 12 male voices, string quartet, flute, bass trombone, percussion)
- The Second Coming (2001; SATB choir and organ)
- Mother and Child (2002)
- Elizabeth Full Of Grace (2002)
- The Veil of the Temple (2003; soprano, SATB choir, boys' choir, ensemble)
- Butterfly Dreams, for mixed chorus (2003)
- Shûnya (2003; SATB choir and large Tibetan temple bowl)
- Exhortation and Kohima (2003; two SATB choirs)
- Schuon Lieder (2003; song cycle for soprano, ensemble)
- Laila (2004; music for dance; soprano, tenor, orchestra)
- Krishna (2005; unproduced opera)
- Sollemnitas in Conceptione Immaculata Beatae Mariae Virginis (2006; mass)
- The Beautiful Names (2007)
- Requiem (2008; cello, soloists, chorus, orchestra)
- Towards Silence (2009; 4 string quartets, Tibetan temple bowl)
- They are all gone into the world of light (2011)
- The Death of Ivan Ilyich (2012; monodrama)
- Missa Wellensis (2013; choir)

== Selected recordings ==
- The Whale, Apple Records
- The Protecting Veil, Virgin 561849-2
- Schuon Lieder, Black Box BBM1101
- The Veil of the Temple, RCA 82876661542
- Songs of the Sky, Signum Records SIGCD149
- "Tavener: Choral Works," Hyperion CDA67475
- Missa Wellensis, Signum Records SIGCD442
- Palintropos, A Flock Ascending AFACD001

== Publications ==
- Tavener, John; Thekla, Mother; Moody, Ivan (1 January 1994). Ikons. HarperCollins. ISBN 978-0-00-627871-9.
