= List of compositions by Tomaso Albinoni =

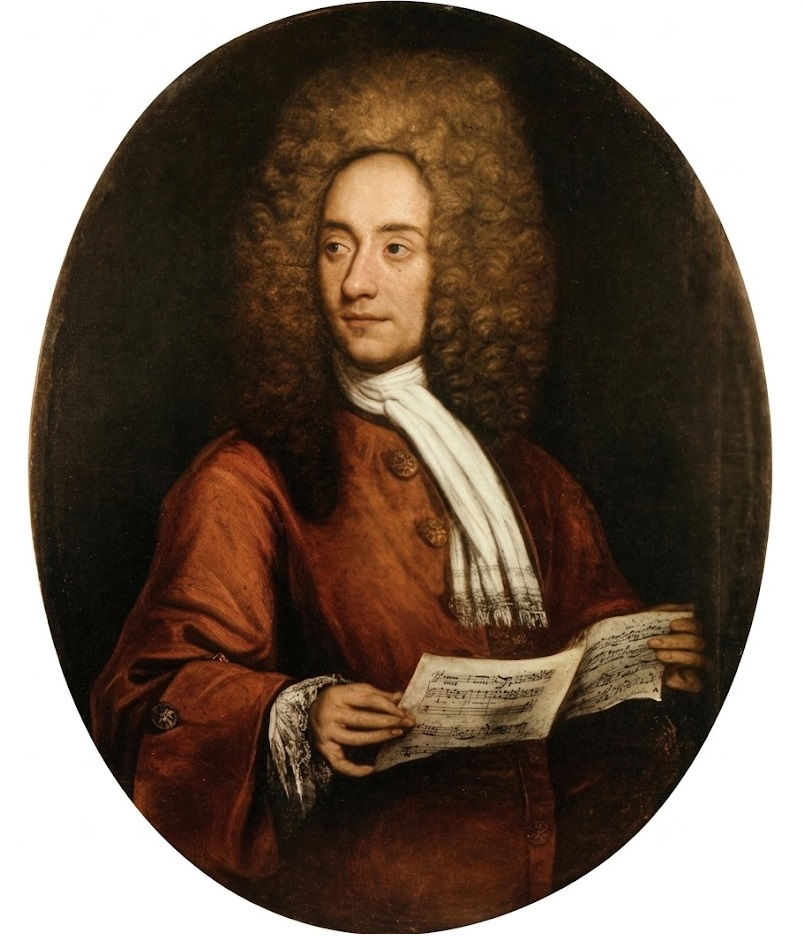
Tomaso Albinoni

This is a list of works by the Italian composer Tomaso Albinoni (1671–1751).

== Vocal music ==
=== Operas ===
Most of Albinoni's operatic works were drammi per musica, but only two of them still exist in a complete form: Zenobia, regina de' Palmireni and La Statira.

Title	Genre	Subdivisions	Libretto	Première date	Place, theatre	Notes
Zenobia, regina de’ Palmireni	dramma per musica	3 acts	Antonio Marchi	1694, carnival	Venice, Teatro Santi Giovanni e Paolo	version of the score survives in Library of Congress, Washington
Il prodigio dell’innocenza	dramma	3 acts	Fulgenzio Maria Gualazzi	1695, carnival	Venice, Teatro Santi Giovanni e Paolo	music lost
Zenone, imperator d’Oriente	dramma per musica	3 acts	Antonio Marchi	1696, autumn	Venice, Teatro S Cassiano	music lost
Il Tigrane, re d’Armenia	dramma per musica	3 acts	Giulio Cesare Corradi	1697, carnival	Venice, Teatro S Cassiano	music lost
Primislao, primo re di Boemia	dramma per musica	3 acts	Giulio Cesare Corradi	1697, autumn	Venice, Teatro S Cassiano	music lost
L’ingratitudine castigata	dramma per musica	3 acts	Francesco Silvani	1698, carnival	Venice, Teatro S Cassiano	music lost, frequently revived as L'Alarico
Radamisto	dramma per musica	3 acts	Antonio Marchi	1698, autumn	Venice, Teatro Sant'Angelo	music lost, except some arias
Diomede punito da Alcide	dramma	3 acts	Aurelio Aureli	1700, autumn	Venice, Teatro Sant'Angelo	music lost
L’inganno innocente	dramma per musica	3 acts	Francesco Silvani	1701, carnival	Venice, Teatro Sant'Angelo	music lost, except some arias
L’arte in gara con l’arte	dramma per musica	3 acts	Francesco Silvani	1702, carnival	Venice, Teatro S Cassiano	music lost
Griselda	dramma per musica	3 acts	Apostolo Zeno	1703, carnival	Florence, Cocomero	music lost, except three arias
Aminta	dramma regio pastorale	3 acts	Apostolo Zeno	1703, autumn	Florence, Cocomero	music lost
Il più fedel tra i vassalli	dramma per musica	3 acts	Francesco Silvani	1705, autumn	Genoa, Falcone	music lost
La prosperità di Elio Sejano	dramma per musica	3 acts	Nicolò Minato	1707, carnival	Genoa, Falcone	music lost
La fede tra gl’inganni	dramma per musica	3 acts	Francesco Silvani	1707, Carnival	Venice, Teatro Sant'Angelo	music lost
La fortezza al cimento	melodramma	2 acts	Francesco Silvani	1707	Piacenza, Ducale	music lost
Astarto	dramma per musica	3 acts	Apostolo Zeno and Pietro Pariati	1708, autumn	Venice, Teatro S Cassiano	music lost, except some arias
Pimpinone	intermezzo	3 intermezzos	Pietro Pariati	1708, autumn	Venice, Teatro S Cassiano	
Engelberta	dramma per musica	3 acts	Apostolo Zeno and Pietro Pariati	1709, carnival	Venice, Teatro S Cassiano	4th and 5th acts by Francesco Gasparini
Il tradimento tradito	dramma per musica	3 acts	Francesco Silvani	1708, carnival	Venice, Teatro Sant'Angelo	music lost
Ciro riconosciuto	dramma per musica	3 acts	Pietro Pariati	1710, carnival	Venice, Teatro S Cassiano	music lost, except some arias
Il tiranno eroe	dramma per musica	3 acts	Vincenzo Cassani	1711, carnival	Venice, Teatro S Cassiano	music lost, except 26 arias
Il Giustino	dramma per musica	5 acts	Pietro Pariati after Nicolò Beregan	1711, spring	Bologna, Formagliari	music lost
La pace generosa	dramma per musica	3 acts	Francesco Silvani	1711, autumn	Genoa, Falcone	music lost
Le gare generose	dramma per musica	3 acts	Antonio Zaniboni	1712, autumn	Venice, Teatro S Cassiano	music lost, except five arias
Lucio Vero	dramma per musica	3 acts	Apostolo Zeno	1713, spring	Ferrara, S Stefano	music lost
L'amor di figlio non conosciuto	dramma per musica	3 acts	Domenico Lalli	1716, carnival	Venice, Teatro Sant'Angelo	music lost
Eumene	dramma per musica	3 acts	Antonio Salvi	1717, autumn	Venice, Teatro San Giovanni Grisostomo	music lost, except one aria
Meleagro	dramma per musica	3 acts	Pietro Antonio Bernardoni	1718, carnival	Venice, Teatro Sant'Angelo	music lost
Cleomene	dramma per musica	3 acts	Vincenzo Cassani	1718, carnival	Venice, Teatro Sant'Angelo	music lost
Gli eccessi della gelosia	dramma per musica	3 acts	Domenico Lalli	1722, carnival	Venice, Teatro Sant'Angelo	music lost, except some arias
I veri amici	dramma per musica	3 acts	Francesco Silvani and Domenico Lalli after Pierre Corneille	1722, October	Munich, Hof	music lost, except 15 arias
Il trionfo d’amore	dramma per musica	3 acts	Pietro Pariati	1722, November	Munich	music lost
Eumene	dramma per musica	3 acts	Apostolo Zeno	1723, carnival	Venice, Teatro San Moisè	music lost, except two arias
Ermengarda	dramma per musica	3 acts	Antonio Maria Lucchini	1723, autumn	Venice, Teatro San Moisè	music lost, except one aria
Antigono, tutore di Filippo, re di Macedonia	tragedia	5 acts	Giovanni Piazzon	1724, carnival	Venice, Teatro San Moisè	5th act by Giovanni Porta, music lost except one aria
Scipione nelle Spagne	dramma per musica	3 acts	Apostolo Zeno	1724, Ascension	Venice, Teatro San Samuele	music lost, except some arias
Laodice	dramma per musica	3 acts	Angelo Schietti	1724, autumn	Venice, Teatro San Moisè	music lost, except two arias
Didone abbandonata	tragedia	3 acts	Metastasio	1725, carnival	Venice, Teatro S Cassiano	music lost
L'impresario delle Isole Canarie	intermezzo	2 acts	Metastasio	1725, carnival	Venice, Teatro S Cassiano	music lost
Alcina delusa da Ruggero	dramma per musica	3 acts	Antonio Marchi	1725, autumn	Venice, Teatro S Cassiano	music lost, revived as Gl'evenimenti di Rugero (Venice, Teatro S Moisè, carnival 1732)
I rivali generosi	dramma per musica	3 acts	Apostolo Zeno	1725	Brescia, Nuovo	music lost
La Statira	dramma per musica	3 acts	Apostolo Zeno and Pietro Pariati	1726, Carnival	Rome, Teatro Capranica	
Malsazio e Fiammetta	intermezzo			1726, Carnival	Rome, Teatro Capranica	text and music lost
Il trionfo di Armida	dramma per musica	3 acts	Girolamo Colatelli after Torquato Tasso	1726, autumn	Venice, Teatro San Moisè	music lost
L’incostanza schernita	dramma comico-pastorale	3 acts	Vincenzo Cassani	1727, Ascension	Venice, Teatro San Samuele	music lost, except some arias
Le due rivali in amore	dramma per musica	3 acts	Aurelio Aureli	1728, autumn	Venice, Teatro San Moisè	music lost
Il Satrapone	intermezzo		Antonio Salvi	1729	Parma, Omodeo	music lost
Li stratagemmi amorosi	dramma per musica	3 acts	F Passerini	1730, carnival	Venice, Teatro San Moisè	music lost
Elenia	dramma per musica	3 acts	Luisa Bergalli	1730, carnival	Venice, Teatro Sant'Angelo	music lost
Merope	dramma	3 acts	Apostolo Zeno	1731, autumn	Prague, Sporck Theater	mostly by Albinoni, music lost
Il più infedel tra gli amanti	dramma per musica	3 acts	Angelo Schietti	1731, autumn	Treviso, Dolphin	music lost
Ardelinda	dramma	3 acts	Bartolomeo Vitturi	1732, autumn	Venice, Teatro Sant'Angelo	music lost, except five arias
Candalide	dramma per musica	3 acts	Bartolomeo Vitturi	1734, carnival	Venice, Teatro Sant'Angelo	music lost
Artamene	dramma per musica	3 acts	Bartolomeo Vitturi	1741, carnival	Venice, Teatro Sant'Angelo	music lost

=== Intermezzi ===
- (Vespetta e) Pimpinone (Pietro Pariati), Venice 1708
- Malsazio e Fiammetta (unidentified), Rome 1726 (text and music lost)
- Il Satrapone (Antonio Salvi), P 1729 (music lost)
- L'impresario delle Isole Canarie (Pietro Metastasio) 1725 (music lost)

=== Serenate ===
- Il nascimento dell’Aurora (unidentified), Venice 1715
- Il nome glorioso in terra, santificato in cielo (Vincenzo Cassani), Venice 1724
- Il concilio de’ pianeti (Girolamo Baruffaldi), Venice 1729

=== Cantatas ===
- 12 Cantate da camera a voce sola, op. 4 (for voices and bass continuo), Venice 1702
  - No. 1: Amor, Sorte, Destino (for soprano)
  - No. 2: Da l’arco d’un bel ciglio (for alto)
  - No. 3: Del chiaro rio (for soprano)
  - No. 4: Riedi a me, luce gradita (for alto)
  - No. 5: Lontananza crudel, mi squarci il core (for soprano)
  - No. 6: Filli, chiedi al mio core (for alto)
  - No. 7: Ove rivolgo il piede (for soprano)
  - No. 8: Mi dà pena quando spira (for alto)
  - No. 9: Parti, mi lasci, ah quale (for soprano)
  - No. 10: Son qual Tantalo novello (for alto)
  - No. 11: Poiché al vago seren di due pupille (for soprano)
  - No. 12: Chi non sa quanto inumano (for alto)
- 18 Cantatas for Soprano and Bass continuo, Staatsbibliothek Berlin, ms. 447
  - No. 1: Il bel ciglio d’Irene
  - No. 2: Già dal mar sorgea l’alba
  - No. 3: Amarissime pene, suonate ormai
  - No. 4: (as op. 4 no. 5)
  - No. 5: Sorgea col lume in fronte
  - No. 6: Lontan da te, mia vita
  - No. 7: Sovra letto d’erbette
  - No. 8: (as op. 4 no. 11)
  - No. 9: Il penar senza speranza
  - No. 10: Senti, bel sol, deh senti
  - No. 11: Quest’è l’ora fatale
  - No. 12: Di tante ree sciagure
  - No. 13: Fileno, caro amico
  - No. 14: Sovra molle origliere
  - No. 15: Clori nel ciel d’amor lucida stella
  - No. 16: Dubbio affetto il cor mi strugge (Amante timido)
  - No. 17: Rivolse Clori un giorno
  - No. 18: Donna illustre del Latio
- Other cantatas
  - Bel fantasmo tu fosti al mio pensiero (for soprano and bass continuo)
  - Bella, perché tu forsi (for soprano and bass continuo)
  - Biondo crin, occhio nero, e sen d’avorio (for soprano and bass continuo)
  - Che ne dici, che risolvi (for soprano and bass continuo)
  - Crudelissimo amore (for alto and bass continuo)
  - Dove sei, che fai cor mio (for soprano and bass continuo)
  - E dove, Amor, mi guidi (for soprano, instruments and bass continuo)
  - Fatto bersaglio eterno (for alto and bass continuo)
  - Già tornava l’aurora
  - In alta rocca, ove d’un genio amico (for soprano and bass continuo)
  - Io che per colpa sol del fatio rio (for soprano and bass continuo)
  - Là dove il nobil Giano (for soprano and bass continuo)
  - Quanta pietà mi date, o mesti fiori (for soprano and bass continuo)
  - Senza il core del mio bene (for soprano or alto and bass continuo)
  - Vorrei che lo sapessi (for alto and bass continuo)
  - Vorrei scoprir l’affanno (for soprano and bass continuo)

=== Religious music ===
- Messa a tre voci (for 2 tenors and bass, a cappella), before 1694
- I trionfi di Giosuè (Oratorium; Text: Giovanni Pietro Berzini), Florence 1703 (together with Alessandro Scarlatti, Giovanni Bononcini et al.)
- Maria annunziata (Oratorium; Text: Francesco Silvani), Florence 1712

== Instrumental music ==
=== With opus numbers ===
- Op. 1: 12 Sonate a tre (for 2 violins and basso continuo), Venice 1694
  - No. 1 in D minor
  - No. 2 in F major
  - No. 3 in A major
  - No. 4 in G minor
  - No. 5 in C major
  - No. 6 in A minor
  - No. 7 in G major
  - No. 8 in B minor
  - No. 9 in D major
  - No. 10 in F minor
  - No. 11 in E minor
  - No. 12 in B♭ major
- Op. 2: 6 Sinfonie & 6 Concerti a cinque (for solo violin (in concertos only), 2 violins, 2 violas and basso continuo), Venice 1700
  - Sonata No. 1 in G major
  - Concerto No. 1 in F major
  - Sonata No. 2 in C major
  - Concerto No. 2 in E minor (=BWV Anh. 23)
  - Sonata No. 3 in A major
  - Concerto No. 3 in B♭ major
  - Sonata No. 4 in C minor
  - Concerto No. 4 in G major
  - Sonata No. 5 in B♭ major
  - Concerto No. 5 in C major
  - Sonata No. 6 in G minor
  - Concerto No. 6 in D major
- Op. 3: 12 Balletti a tre (for 2 violins and basso continuo), Venice 1701
  - No. 1 in C major
  - No. 2 in E minor
  - No. 3 in G major
  - No. 4 in A major
  - No. 5 in D minor
  - No. 6 in F major
  - No. 7 in D major
  - No. 8 in C minor
  - No. 9 in G minor
  - No. 10 in E major
  - No. 11 in A minor
  - No. 12 in B♭ major
- Op. 5: 12 Concerti a cinque (for solo violin, 2 violins, 2 violas and basso continuo), Venice 1707
  - No. 1 in B♭ major
  - No. 2 in F major
  - No. 3 in D major
  - No. 4 in G major
  - No. 5 in A minor
  - No. 6 in C major
  - No. 7 in D minor
  - No. 8 in F major
  - No. 9 in E minor
  - No. 10 in A major
  - No. 11 in G minor
  - No. 12 in C major
- Op. 6: 12 Trattenimenti armonici per camera (for violin and basso continuo), Amsterdam c. 1711
  - No. 1 in C major
  - No. 2 in G minor
  - No. 3 in B♭ major
  - No. 4 in D minor
  - No. 5 in F major
  - No. 6 in A minor
  - No. 7 in D major
  - No. 8 in E minor
  - No. 9 in G major
  - No. 10 in C minor
  - No. 11 in A major
  - No. 12 in B♭ major
- Op. 7: 12 Concerti a cinque (for solo violin, 1 or 2 oboes, 2 violins, viola, cello and basso continuo), Amsterdam 1715
  - No. 1 in D major
  - No. 2 in C major (for 2 oboes)
  - No. 3 in B♭ major (for oboe)
  - No. 4 in G major
  - No. 5 in C major (for 2 oboes)
  - No. 6 in D major (for oboe)
  - No. 7 in A major
  - No. 8 in D major (for 2 oboes)
  - No. 9 in F major (for oboe)
  - No. 10 in B♭ major
  - No. 11 in C major (for 2 oboes)
  - No. 12 in C major (for oboe)
- Op. 8: 6 Balletti & 6 Sonate a tre (for 2 violins and basso continuo), 1722
  - Sonata No. 1 in B♭ major
  - Balletto No. 1 in D minor
  - Sonata No. 2 in A major
  - Balletto No. 2 in F major
  - Sonata No. 3 in C major
  - Balletto No. 3 in D major
  - Sonata No. 4 in G minor
  - Balletto No. 4 in B♭ major
  - Sonata No. 5 in F major
  - Balletto No. 5 in C major
  - Sonata No. 6 in C minor
  - Balletto No. 6 in G minor
- Op. 9: 12 Concerti a cinque (for solo violin, 1 or 2 oboes, 2 violins, viola, cello and basso continuo), Amsterdam 1722
  - No. 1 in B♭ major (for violin)
  - No. 2 in D minor (for oboe)
  - No. 3 in F major (for 2 oboes)
  - No. 4 in A major (for violin)
  - No. 5 in C major (for oboe)
  - No. 6 in G major (for 2 oboes)
  - No. 7 in D major (for violin)
  - No. 8 in G minor (for oboe)
  - No. 9 in C major (for 2 oboes)
  - No. 10 in F major (for violin)
  - No. 11 in B♭ major (for oboe)
  - No. 12 in D major (for 2 oboes)
- Op. 10: 12 Concerti a cinque (for solo violin, 2 violins, viola, cello and basso continuo), Amsterdam 1735/36
  - No. 1 in B♭ major
  - No. 2 in G minor (for violin)
  - No. 3 in C major
  - No. 4 in G major (for violin)
  - No. 5 in A major
  - No. 6 in D major (for violin)
  - No. 7 in F major
  - No. 8 in G minor (for violin)
  - No. 9 in C major
  - No. 10 in F major (for violin)
  - No. 11 in C minor
  - No. 12 in B♭ major (for violin)
- Op. 11: Sonate a tre (for two violins and basso continuo), c. 1739 (not published) (lost)

=== Without opus numbers ===
==== Sinfonias ====
- Si 1: Sinfonia in D major for the first act of Zenobia (for natural trumpet, 2 violins, 2 violas, cello and basso continuo), 1694
- Si 2: Sinfonia in F major for the first act of Engelberta (for 2 violins, 2 violas, cello and basso continuo), 1709
- Si 3: Sinfonia in A major (for 2 violins, viola, violone, and basso continuo), c. 1707–15
- Si 4: Sinfonia in D major (for 2 violins, viola and basso continuo; manuscript versions for 2 oboes and bassoon), c. 1707–15
- Si 5: Sinfonia in A major (for 2 violins, viola and basso continuo), c. 1707–15
- Si 6: Sinfonia in B major (for 2 violins, viola, bassoon and basso continuo), c. 1715–22
- Si 7: Sinfonia in G minor (for 2 flutes, 2 oboes, 2 violins, 2 violas, bassoon and basso continuo), c. 1715–22
- Si 8: Sinfonia in G major (for 2 violins, viola and basso continuo), c. 1722–35
- Si 9: Sinfonia in F major (for 2 violins, viola and basso continuo), c. 1722–35

==== Concertos ====
- Co 1: Concerto in D major (for solo violin, 2 violins, viola, violone and basso continuo), before 1700
- Co 2: Concerto in C major (for solo violin, 2 violins, viola and basso continuo), c. 1717
- Co 3: Concerto in D major (for solo violin and strings), c. 1715–22
- Co 4: Concerto in G major (for 1 or 2 solo violins, 2 violins, viola and basso continuo), c. 1717
- Co 5: Concerto in A major adapted by Pisendel (for solo violin, 2 violins, viola and basso continuo), c. 1717

==== Sonatas ====
- So 1: Sonata a sei con tromba in C major (for natural trumpet, 2 violins, 2 violas and basso continuo), c. 1700
- So 2–7: Balletti a cinque (for 2 violins, 2 violas and basso continuo), c. 1702
  - So 2: Balletto 1 in B♭ major
  - So 3: Balletto 2 in G minor
  - So 4: Balletto 3 in E minor
  - So 5: Balletto 4 in F minor
  - So 6: Balletto 5 in A major
  - So 7: Balletto 6 in F major
- So 8–19: Balletti a quattro (for 2 violins, viola and basso continuo), c. 1700
  - So 8: Balletto 1 in G major
  - So 9: Balletto 2 in B minor
  - So 10: Balletto 3 in D major
  - So 11: Balletto 4 in A major
  - So 12: Balletto 5 in C major
  - So 13: Balletto 6 in E minor
  - So 14: Balletto 7 in F major
  - So 15: Balletto 8 in A minor
  - So 16: Balletto 9 in B♭ major
  - So 17: Balletto 10 in D minor
  - So 18: Balletto 11 in E major
  - So 19: Balletto 12 in G minor
- So 20–25: Sonate a tre (for 2 violins and basso continuo), before 1700
  - So 20: Sonata 1 in C major
  - So 21: Sonata 2 in B♭ major
  - So 22: Sonata 3 in F major
  - So 23: Sonata 4 in D major
  - So 24: Sonata 5 in G major
  - So 25: Sonata 6 in A major
- So 26–31: Sonate da chiesa ("op. 4") (for violin and basso continuo), Amsterdam 1708
  - So 26: Sonata 1 in D minor
  - So 27: Sonata 2 in E minor
  - So 28: Sonata 3 in B♭ major
  - So 29: Sonata 4 in G minor (spurious)
  - So 30: Sonata 5 in G minor
  - So 31: Sonata 6 in B minor
- So 32: Sonata a violino solo composta per il Sig. Pisendel in B♭ major (for violin and basso continuo), c. 1717
- So 33: Solo in G minor (for violin and basso continuo), c. 1717
- So 34: Solo in B♭ major (for violin and basso continuo), c. 1717
- So 35–39: Sonate a violino solo e basso continuo (for violin and basso continuo), Amsterdam c. 1717
  - So 35: Sonata 1 in D minor
  - So 36: Sonata 2 in G minor
  - So 37: Sonata 3 in A major
  - So 38: Sonata 4 in A major
  - So 39: Sonata 5 in E minor (spurious)
- So 40–45: Six sonates da camera (op. post.) (for violin and basso continuo), Paris c. 1740
  - So 40: Sonata 1 in F major (spurious)
  - So 41: Sonata 2 in A minor
  - So 42: Sonata 3 in E major (spurious)
  - So 43: Sonata 4 in D minor (spurious)
  - So 44: Sonata 5 in D major (spurious)
  - So 45: Sonata 6 in A major
