= Classic 100 Baroque and Before =

In 2014, the Australian radio station ABC Classic FM held the Classic 100 Baroque and Before countdown.

The selection of works available in the survey was determined between 11 April and 22 April (with the public being able to add works to the list initiated by the station). Voting by the public for the finalised list of works was held between 2 May and 19 May. The countdown was broadcast from 6 to 9 June 2014.

== Countdown results ==
The results of the countdown are as follows:

| Rank | Composer | Work | Date |
|---|---|---|---|
| 1 | Handel | Messiah | 1741 |
| 2 | Vivaldi | The Four Seasons | 1725 |
| 3 | Allegri | Miserere | 1630s |
| 4 | Handel | Water Music | 1717 |
| 5 | Bach, Johann Sebastian | St Matthew Passion, BWV 244 | 1727 |
| 6 | Pachelbel | Canon and Gigue in D | 1680 |
| 7 | Purcell | Dido and Aeneas | 1688 |
| 8 | Handel | Four Coronation Anthems (includes "Zadok the Priest") | 1727 |
| 9 | Handel | Music for the Royal Fireworks | 1749 |
| 10 | Tallis | Spem in alium | c. 1570 |
| 11 | Bach, Johann Sebastian | Concerto for 2 Violins in D minor, BWV 1043 | 1723 |
| 12 | Bach, Johann Sebastian | Goldberg Variations, BWV 988 | 1741 |
| 13 | Vivaldi | Gloria, RV 589 | c. 1715 |
| 14 | Bach, Johann Sebastian | Suite for Solo Cello No. 1, BWV 1007 | early 18th century |
| 15 | Pergolesi | Stabat Mater | 1736 |
| 16 | Bach, Johann Sebastian | Brandenburg Concerto No. 3, BWV 1048 | 1721 |
| 17 | Bach, Johann Sebastian | Herz und Mund und Tat und Leben, BWV 147 (Includes Jesu, Joy of Man's Desiring) | 1723 |
| 18 | Bach, Johann Sebastian | Mass in B minor | 1749 |
| 19 | Corelli | Twelve concerti grossi, Op. 6 (includes No. 8, Christmas Concerto) | 1714 |
| 20 | Monteverdi | Vespers of the Blessed Virgin | 1610 |
| 21 | Bach, Johann Sebastian | Toccata and Fugue in D minor, BWV 565 | early 18th century |
| 22 | Bach, Johann Sebastian | Brandenburg Concerto No. 5, BWV 1050 | 1721 |
| 23 | Handel | Solomon | 1748 |
| 24 | Bach, Johann Sebastian | Brandenburg Concerto No. 1, BWV 1046 | 1721 |
| 25 | Bach, Johann Sebastian | The Well-Tempered Clavier | 1722, 1742 |
| 26 | Anonymous | Greensleeves | 16th century |
| 27 | Purcell | Come Ye Sons of Art | 1694 |
| 28 | Handel | Serse | 1738 |
| 29 | Bach, Johann Sebastian | Brandenburg concerto No. 4, BWV 1049 | 1721 |
| 30 | Dowland | Lute songs | 1597–1612 |
| 31 | Bach, Johann Sebastian | Christmas Oratorio, BWV 248 | 1734 |
| 32 | Handel | Rinaldo | 1711 |
| 33 | Bach, Johann Sebastian | St John Passion, BWV 245 | 1724 |
| 34 | Bach, Johann Sebastian | Brandenburg concerto No. 2, BWV 1047 | 1721 |
| 35 | Bach, Johann Sebastian | Brandenburg concerto No. 6, BWV 1051 | 1721 |
| 36 | Clarke | Prince of Denmark's March | c. 1700 |
| 37 | Vivaldi | Concerto for 2 Mandolins in G Major, RV 532 | 18th century |
| 38 | Handel | Giulio Cesare | 1724 |
| 39 | Monteverdi | L'incoronazione di Poppea | 1642 |
| 40 | Bach, Johann Sebastian | Wachet auf, ruft uns die Stimme, BWV 140 | 1731 |
| 41 | Bach, Johann Sebastian | Was mir behagt, ist nur die muntre Jagd, BWV 208 | 1713 |
| 42 | Bach, Johann Sebastian | Orchestral Suite No. 3 in D major, BWV 1068 | 1730 |
| 43 | Monteverdi | L'Orfeo | 1607 |
| 44 | Handel | Dixit Dominus | 1707 |
| 45 | Anonymous | O come, O come, Emmanuel | 8th century |
| 46 | Marais | Pièces de viole (includes "The Bells of St. Genevieve") | 1723 |
| 47 | Albinoni | Concerto for Oboe in D minor, Op. 9 No. 2 | 1722 |
| 48 | Handel | Semele | 1743 |
| 49 | Purcell, Henry | Music for the Funeral of Queen Mary | 1695 |
| 50 | Bach, Johann Sebastian | Magnificat, BWV 243 | 1723, 1733 |
| 51 | Anonymous | Coventry Carol | 16th century |
| 52 | Byrd | Ave verum corpus | 1605 |
| 53 | Bach, Johann Sebastian | Jesu, der du meine Seele, BWV 78 | 1724 |
| 54 | Bach, Johann Sebastian | Partita for Violin No. 2, BWV 1004 | early 18th century |
| 55 | Hildegard of Bingen | Chants for the Feast of St. Ursula | 12th century |
| 56 | Purcell | The Fairy-Queen | 1692 |
| 57 | Charpentier | Te Deum | 1692 |
| 58 | Hildegard of Bingen | Kyrie eleison | 12th century |
| 59 | Praetorius, Michael | Terpsichore | 1612 |
| 60 | Bach, Johann Sebastian | Ich habe genug, BWV 82 | 1727 |
| 61 | Bach, Johann Sebastian | The Art of Fugue | 1750 |
| 62 | Bach, Carl Philipp Emanuel | Magnificat, Wq215 | 1749 |
| 63 | Monteverdi | Magnificat Primo | c. 17th century |
| 64 | Palestrina | Missa Papae Marcelli | c. 1562 |
| 65 | Purcell, Henry | Trumpet Tune and Air | late 17th century |
| 66 | Handel | Judas Maccabaeus (includes "See, the Conqu’ring Hero Comes!") | 1746 |
| 67 | Bach, Johann Sebastian (actually Stölzel) | Bist du bei mir (Notebook for Anna Magdalena Bach) | c. 1718 |
| 68 | Bach, Johann Sebastian | Cello Suite No. 3, BWV 1009 | early 18th century |
| 69 | Bach, Johann Sebastian | Toccata and Fugue in D minor ("Dorian"), BWV 538 | early 18th century |
| 70 | Bach, Johann Sebastian | Concerto for Violin in A minor, BWV 1041 | early 18th century |
| 71 | Telemann | Concerto for Trumpet in D | 18th century |
| 72 | Handel | Concerti grossi, Op. 6 | 1739 |
| 73 | Handel | Harpsichord Suite in E, HWV 430 (includes The Harmonious Blacksmith) | 1720 |
| 74 | Bach, Johann Sebastian | Cello Suite No. 6, BWV 1012 | early 18th century |
| 75 | Corelli | 12 Sonatas, Op 5 (includes No 12, "La Folia") | 1700 |
| 76 | Telemann | Tafelmusik | 1733 |
| 77 | Bach, Johann Sebastian | Cello Suite No. 2, BWV 1008 | early 18th century |
| 78 | Vivaldi | Concerto for Lute or Mandolin in D Major RV 93 | 18th century |
| 79 | Palestrina | Stabat Mater in 8 parts | 16th century |
| 80 | Byrd | Mass for Four Voices | 1593–1594 |
| 81 | Rameau | Les Indes galantes | 1735 |
| 82 | Handel | Alcina | 1735 |
| 83 | Vivaldi | Stabat Mater, RV 621 | 1727 |
| 84 | Purcell | Rejoice in the Lord alway | late 17th century |
| 85 | Vivaldi | Concerto for two trumpets in C, RV 537 | early 18th century |
| 86 | Monteverdi | Eight Books of Madrigals | 1587–1638 |
| 87 | Handel | Ode for St. Cecilia's Day | 1739 |
| 88 | Tartini | Devil's Trill Sonata | early 18th century |
| 89 | Lully | Le Bourgeois gentilhomme | 1670 |
| 90 | Bach, Johann Sebastian | Passacaglia and Fugue in C minor, BWV 582 | early 18th century |
| 91 | Vivaldi | Dixit Dominus, RV 594 | early 18th century |
| 92 | Couperin, François | Pièces de Clavecin, book 2 | 1717 |
| 93 | Bach, Johann Sebastian | Concerto for Violin in E major, BWV 1042 | early 18th century |
| 94 | Byrd | Mass for Five Voices | 1594–1595 |
| 95 | Albinoni | Concerto for Oboe in B-flat, Op. 9 No. 11 | 1722 |
| 96 | Bach, Johann Sebastian | Partitas for keyboard, BWV 825–830 | 1731 |
| 97 | Anonymous | Llibre Vermell de Montserrat | 14th century |
| 98 | Heinrich Ignaz Franz Biber | Rosary Sonatas (including Passacaglia) | late 17th century |
| 99 | Albinoni | Concerto for Two Oboes in G, Op. 9 No. 6 | 1722 |
| 100 | Anonymous | Sumer is icumen in | mid 13th century |

== By composer ==
The following 31 composers, including five anonymous, were featured in the countdown:

| Composer | Nationality | Works |
|---|---|---|
| Albinoni | Italian | 3 |
| Allegri | Italian | 1 |
| Anonymous | Various | 5 |
| Bach, Carl Philipp Emanuel | German | 1 |
| Bach, Johann Sebastian | German | 33 |
| Biber | Austrian | 1 |
| Byrd | English | 3 |
| Charpentier | French | 1 |
| Clarke | English | 1 |
| Corelli | Italian | 2 |
| Couperin | French | 1 |
| Dowland | English | 1 |
| Handel | German/English | 15 |
| Hildegard of Bingen | German | 2 |
| Lully | French | 1 |
| Marais | French | 1 |
| Monteverdi | Italian | 5 |
| Pachelbel | German | 1 |
| Palestrina | Italian | 2 |
| Pergolesi | Italian | 1 |
| Praetorius | German | 1 |
| Purcell | English | 6 |
| Rameau | French | 1 |
| Tallis | English | 1 |
| Tartini | Italian | 1 |
| Telemann | German | 2 |
| Vivaldi | Italian | 7 |

== See also ==
- Classic 100 Countdowns
