= Classic 100 Concerto (ABC) =

In 2007, the Australian radio station ABC Classic FM held a Classic 100 Concerto countdown. The works in the countdown were selected by votes cast by listeners to the station.

The broadcasting of the results of the countdown began on 27 October 2007 and concluded on 31 October 2007. The concert featuring the final five works was broadcast live from the Hamer Hall in Melbourne, and featured the Australian Pro Arte Chamber Orchestra.

== Countdown results ==
The results of the countdown are as follows:

Rank	Composer	Work	Key	Instrument	Opus	Date
100	Vivaldi	Concerto for Two Mandolins	G major	Mandolin	RV 532	
99	Carl Vine	Piano Concerto		Piano		
98	Vaughan Williams	Tuba Concerto	F minor	Tuba		1954
97	Telemann	Viola Concerto	G major	Viola	TWV 51:G9	
96	Shostakovich	Piano Concerto No. 1	C minor	Piano	Op.35	1933
95	Mozart	Bassoon Concerto	B♭ major	Bassoon	K 191	1774
94	Saint-Saëns	Piano Concerto No. 5 The Egyptian	F major	Piano	Op.103	1896
93	Giuliani	Concerto for Guitar and Strings No. 1		Guitar and strings	Op.30	
92	Ross Edwards	Oboe Concerto		Oboe		2002
91	J.S. Bach	Brandenburg Concerto No. 1	F major	Various	BWV 1046	1721
90	Vivaldi	Concerto for Two Trumpets	C major	Trumpet	RV 537	
89	Liszt	Piano Concerto No. 1	E♭ major	Piano	S 124	1849
88	Korngold	Violin Concerto	D major	Violin	Op.35	1945
87	Haydn	Cello Concerto No. 2	D major	Cello	Hob.VIIb:2	1783
86	Glazunov	Saxophone Concerto	E♭ major	Saxophone	Op.109	1934
85	J.S. Bach	Harpsichord Concerto No. 1	D minor	Harpsichord	BWV 1052	
84	Bruch	Scottish Fantasy	E♭ major	Violin	Op.46	1880
83	J.S. Bach	Brandenburg Concerto No. 6	B♭ major	Various	BWV 1051	1721
82	Mozart	Oboe Concerto	C major	Oboe	K 314	1777
81	Telemann	Concerto for Flute, Oboe d'amore and Viola d'amore		Flute, oboe, and viola		
80	Mozart	Horn Concerto No. 1	D major	Horn	K 412	1791
79	J.S. Bach	Violin Concerto	E major	Violin	BWV 1042	
78	Shostakovich	Violin Concerto No. 1	A minor	Violin	Op.77	1948
77	Prokofiev	Piano Concerto No. 3	C major	Piano	Op.26	1921
76	Mozart	Piano Concerto No. 9	E♭ major	Piano	K 271	1777
75	Vivaldi	Lute Concerto	D major	Lute	RV 93	
74	Shostakovich	Cello Concerto No. 1	E♭ major	Cello	Op.107	1959
73	Hummel	Piano Concerto No. 2	A minor	Piano	Op.85	1816
72	Berg	Violin Concerto		Violin		1935
71	J.S. Bach	Brandenburg Concerto No. 2	F major	Various	BWV 1047	1721
70	Vivaldi	Flute Concerto 'Il gardellino'	D major	Flute	RV 428	
69	Marcello	Oboe Concerto	D minor	Oboe		
68	Barber	Violin Concerto		Violin	Op.14	1939
67	Vaughan Williams	The Lark Ascending		Violin		1914
66	Tchaikovsky	Piano Concerto No. 2	G major	Piano	Op.44	1880
65	Rieding	Violin Concerto	B minor	Violin	Op.35	
64	Rachmaninoff	Rhapsody on a Theme of Paganini	A minor	Piano	Op.43	1934
63	Mozart	Piano Concerto No. 22	E♭ major	Piano	K 482	1785
62	Beethoven	Piano Concerto No. 1	C major	Piano	Op.15	1797
61	J.S. Bach	Brandenburg Concerto No. 4	G major	Various	BWV 1049	1721
60	Handel	Harp Concerto	B♭ major	Harp	HWV 294	1736
59	J.S. Bach	Concerto for Oboe and Violin	C minor	Oboe and violin	BWV 1060R	
58	Saint-Saëns	Piano Concerto No. 2	G minor	Piano	Op.22	1868
57	Litolff	Concerto Symphonique No. 4		Piano	Op.102	
56	Ross Edwards	Violin Concerto Maninyas		Violin		1988
55	Mozart	Violin Concerto No. 3	G major	Violin	K 216	1775
54	Bartók	Concerto for Orchestra		Orchestra	BB 123	1943
53	Weber	Clarinet Concerto No. 1	F minor	Clarinet	Op.73	1811
52	Hummel	Trumpet Concerto	E♭ major	Trumpet	S 49	1803
51	Gershwin	Piano Concerto	F major	Piano		1925
50	Davies	Piano Concerto No.1 Mennonite		Piano		1975
49	Brahms	Concerto for Violin and Cello	A minor	Violin and cello	Op.102	1887
48	Mozart	Piano Concerto No. 27	B♭ major	Piano	K 595	1791
47	Gershwin	Rhapsody in Blue		Piano		1924
46	Addinsell	Warsaw Concerto		Piano		1941
45	Paganini	Violin Concerto No. 1	D major	Violin	Op.6	1818
44	Mozart	Sinfonia Concertante	E♭ major	Violin and viola	K 364	1779
43	Haydn	Cello Concerto No. 1	C major	Cello	Hob.VIIb:1	1765
42	Glass	Violin Concerto		Violin		1987
41	Shostakovich	Piano Concerto No. 2	F major	Piano	Op.102	1957
40	Mozart	Piano Concerto No. 24	C minor	Piano	K 491	1786
39	Vivaldi	Four Seasons – Summer	G minor	Violin	RV 315	1723
38	Vivaldi	Four Seasons – Winter	F minor	Violin	RV 297	1723
37	Beethoven	Piano Concerto No. 3	C minor	Piano	Op.37	1800
36	Albinoni	Oboe Concerto	D minor	Oboe	Op.9 No.2	1722
35	Elgar	Violin Concerto	B minor	Violin	Op.61	1910
34	Chopin	Piano Concerto No. 2	F minor	Piano	Op.21	1830
33	Vivaldi	Four Seasons – Spring	E major	Violin	RV 269	1723
32	Sean O'Boyle and William Barton	Concerto for didgeridoo		Didgeridoo		
31	Schumann	Piano Concerto	A minor	Piano	Op.54	1845
30	J.S. Bach	Brandenburg Concerto No. 5	D major	Various	BWV 1050	1721
29	Mozart	Piano Concerto No. 20	D minor	Piano	K 466	1786
28	Ravel	Piano Concerto	G major	Piano		1931
27	Mozart	Piano Concerto No. 23	A major	Piano	K 488	1786
26	Mozart	Horn Concerto No. 4	E♭ major	Horn	K 495	1786
25	J.S. Bach	Brandenburg Concerto No. 3	G major	Various	BWV 1048	1721
24	Brahms	Piano Concerto No. 1	D minor	Piano	Op.15	1858
23	Chopin	Piano Concerto No. 1	E minor	Piano	Op.11	1830
22	Haydn	Trumpet Concerto	E♭ major	Trumpet	Hob.VIIe:1	1796
21	Mozart	Concerto for Flute and Harp	C major	Flute and harp	K 299	1778
20	Brahms	Piano Concerto No. 2	B♭ major	Piano	Op.83	1881
19	Beethoven	Triple Concerto	C major	Violin, cello, and piano	Op.56	1803
18	Tchaikovsky	Violin Concerto	D major	Violin	Op.35	1878
17	Brahms	Violin Concerto	D major	Violin	Op.77	1878
16	Beethoven	Piano Concerto No. 4	G major	Piano	Op.58	1806
15	Sibelius	Violin Concerto	D minor	Violin	Op.47	1904
14	Dvořák	Cello Concerto	B minor	Cello	Op.104	1895
13	Mozart	Piano Concerto No. 21	C major	Piano	K 467	1785
12	Mendelssohn	Violin Concerto	E minor	Violin	Op.64	1844
11	Grieg	Piano Concerto	A minor	Piano	Op.16	1868
10	Rachmaninoff	Piano Concerto No. 3	D minor	Piano	Op.30	1909
9	Tchaikovsky	Piano Concerto No. 1	B♭ minor	Piano	Op.23	1875
8	J.S. Bach	Concerto for Two Violins	D minor	Violin	BWV 1043	1731
7	Rodrigo	Concierto de Aranjuez		Guitar		1939
6	Mozart	Clarinet Concerto	A major	Clarinet	K 622	1791
5	Elgar	Cello Concerto	E minor	Cello	Op.85	1919
4	Max Bruch	Violin Concerto No. 1	G minor	Violin	Op.26	1866
3	Beethoven	Violin Concerto	D major	Violin	Op.61	1806
2	Rachmaninoff	Piano Concerto No. 2	C minor	Piano	Op.18	1901
1	Beethoven	Piano Concerto No. 5 Emperor Concerto	E♭ major	Piano	Op.73	1811

== By composer ==
The following 45 composers were featured in the countdown:

Composer	Nationality	No. of works
Richard Addinsell	British	1
Tomaso Albinoni	Italian	1
Johann Sebastian Bach	German	10
Samuel Barber	American	1
Béla Bartók	Hungarian	1
Ludwig van Beethoven	German	6
Alban Berg	Austrian	1
Johannes Brahms	German	4
Max Bruch	German	2
Frédéric Chopin	Polish	2
Victor Davies	Canadian	1
Antonín Dvořák	Czech	1
Ross Edwards	Australian	1
Edward Elgar	British	2
George Gershwin	American	2
Mauro Giuliani	Italian	1
Philip Glass	American	1
Alexander Glazunov	Russian	1
Edvard Grieg	Norwegian	1
George Frideric Handel	German-British	1
Joseph Haydn	Austrian	3
Johann Nepomuk Hummel	Austrian	1
Erich Wolfgang Korngold	Austro-Hungarian	1
Franz Liszt	Hungarian	1
Henry Litolff	British	1
Alessandro Marcello	Italian	1
Felix Mendelssohn	German	1
Wolfgang Amadeus Mozart	Austrian	15
Sean O'Boyle	Australian	1
Niccolò Paganini	Italian	1
Sergei Prokofiev	Russian	1
Sergei Rachmaninoff	Russian	3
Maurice Ravel	French	1
Oskar Rieding	German	1
Joaquín Rodrigo	Spanish	1
Camille Saint-Saëns	French	2
Robert Schumann	German	1
Dmitri Shostakovich	Russian	4
Jean Sibelius	Finnish	1
Pyotr Ilyich Tchaikovsky	Russian	3
Georg Philipp Telemann	German	2
Ralph Vaughan Williams	British	2
Carl Vine	Australian	1
Antonio Vivaldi	Italian	7
Carl Maria von Weber	German	1

== See also ==
- Classic 100 Countdowns
