= Lute concerto in D major (Vivaldi) =

Musical composition designated as RV 93

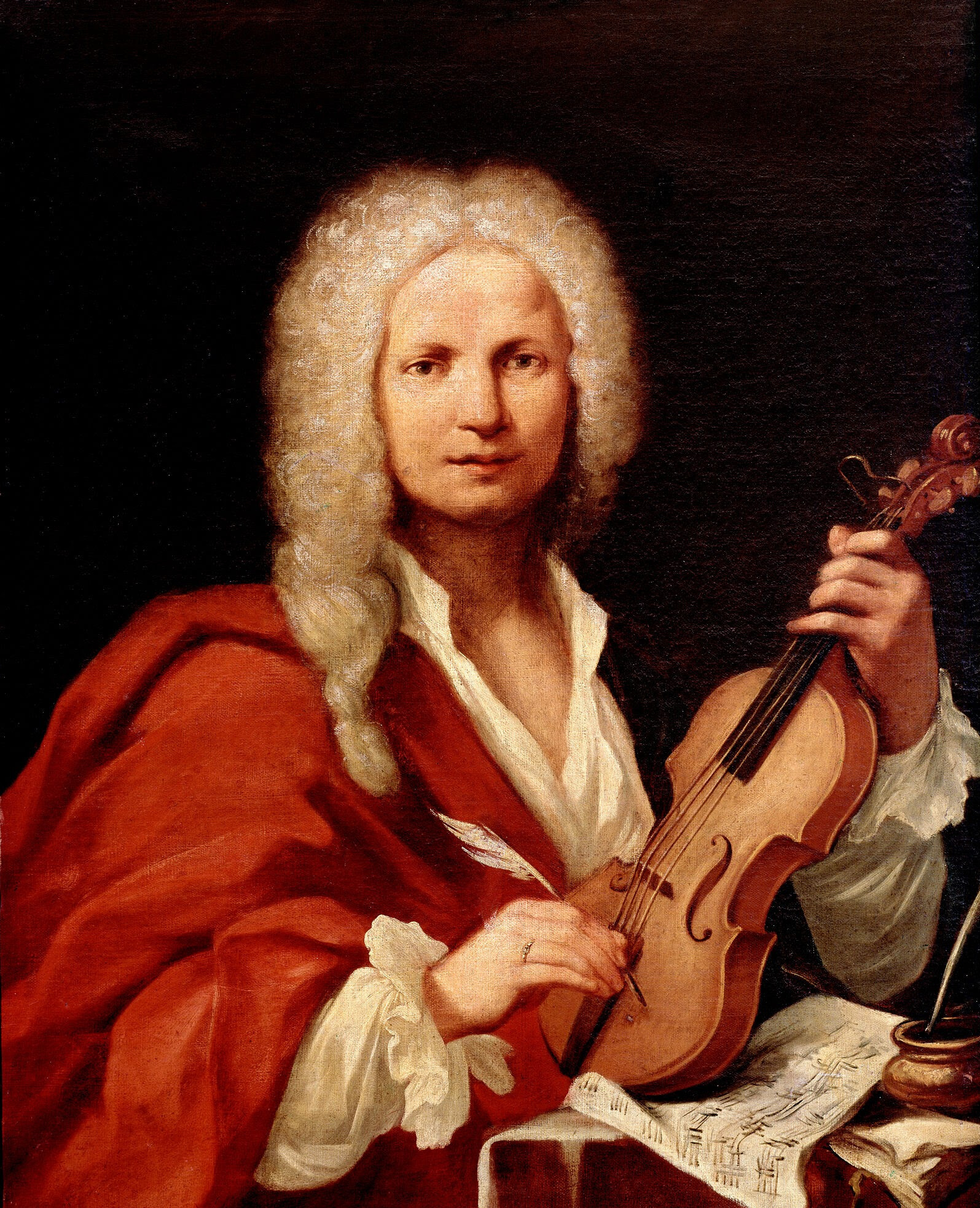
Vivaldi

The Lute Concerto in D major, RV 93, is one of four works featuring the solo lute, 2 violins, and basso continuo written by Antonio Vivaldi. Vivaldi was a prolific composer during the later era of the Baroque period (1600s-mid 1700s). He composed the piece in 1730–1731, a period in which he wrote two of his other works featuring the lute: the trios for violin and lute in G minor and C major.

== Analysis ==
II. Largo
Accordion orchestra arrangement performed by Paul De Bra

The concerto is in three movements:

1. Allegro giusto
2. Largo
3. Allegro

The first movement is in a fast tempo and begins with a ritornello played by the violins and then repeated by the solo lute. According to AllMusic critic Brian Robins, the ritornello "contrasts a tuneful opening theme with a more lyrical motif in the minor mode." During the movement, the solo lute plays melodies in contrast to the ritornello. The movement consists of several sections, almost all of which incorporate a portion of the ritornello melody.

The second movement also consists of several sections. Robins describes this movement as a "reflective meditation by the soloist" against accompaniment by the violins and pizzicato bass. Robins praises the movement's "exquisitely simple shift from triple to duple meter."

The third and final movement is another fast movement in a 6/8 time signature which Robins describes as having "a bit of tarantella-like feel." The soloist also has the option of playing the half notes in the movement using a more vigorous 12/8 time signature.

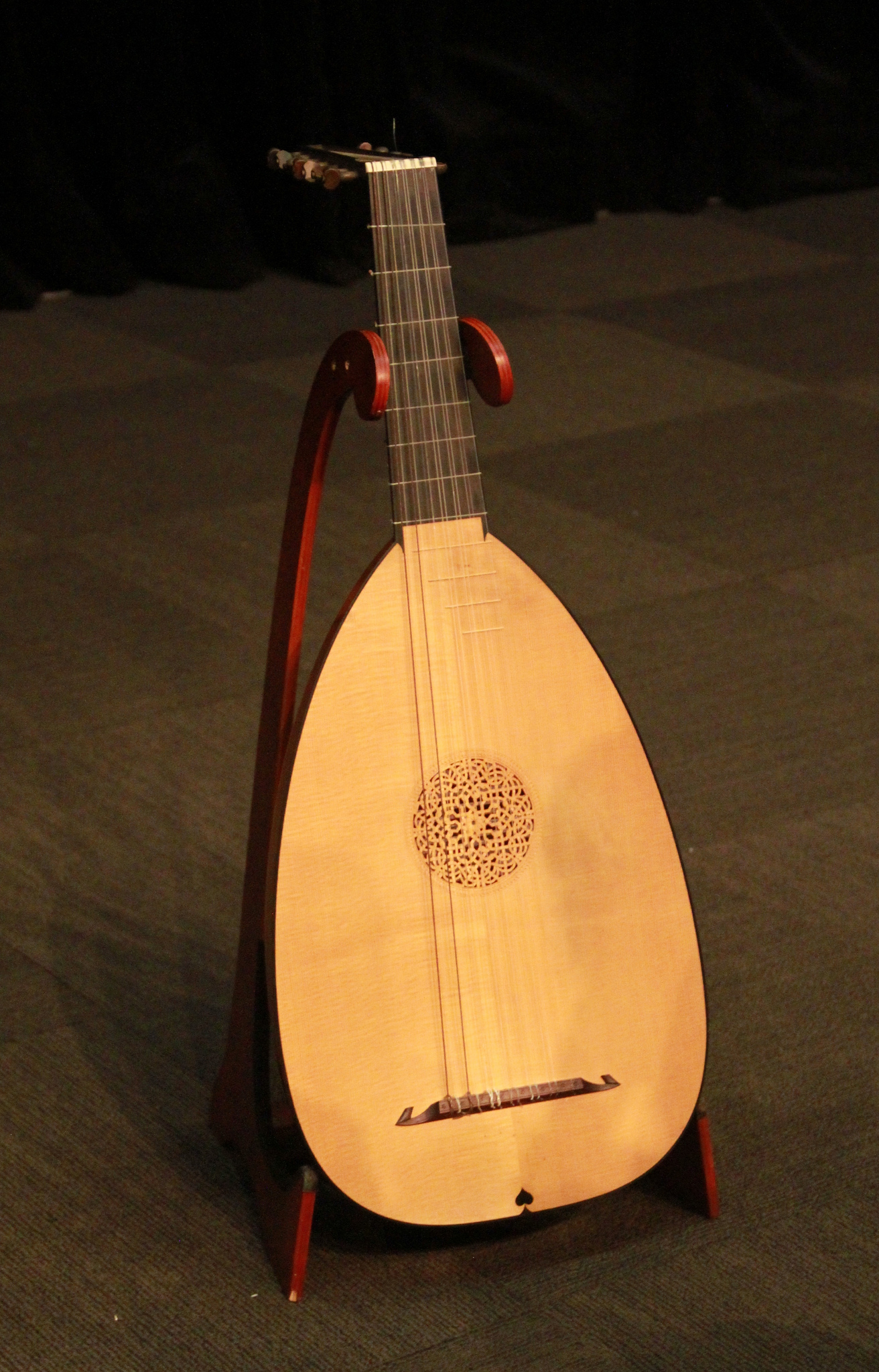
Lute (by Princess Ruto, 2013-02-11)

== Performance ==
The concerto uses the lute primarily in a high register. The lute parts are written primarily as chords, and the lute player is intended to play arpeggios based on these chords. The piece also includes important parts for the violins.

In modern times, the concerto is usually played on guitar. Yes guitarist Steve Howe performed the second movement on guitar on the band's 2002 live album Symphonic Live, into which he incorporated a number of improvisations.

It has also been performed on guitar by more classical soloists, such as John Williams. The piece is also sometimes played on mandolin. The concerto is played on the Ontario Parliament Network and is performed by Canadian guitarists Liona Boyd and Norbert Kraft. It has become the channel's classical staple.

== Legacy of music ==
In 2014, Vivaldi's lute concerto ranked #78 on the ABC Classic FM Classic 100 Baroque and Before countdown. In 2007 it had ranked #75 on the station's Classic 100 concerto countdown.

The autograph manuscript of Vivaldi's lute concerto is currently at the Turin National University Library in Turin, Italy.

The 2nd movement, Largo, was incorporated into Georges Delerue's Oscar-winning score for the 1979 film A Little Romance and played (on guitar) in the 1972 Western The Cowboys.

== See also ==
- List of compositions by Antonio Vivaldi
