= L'impresario delle Isole Canarie =

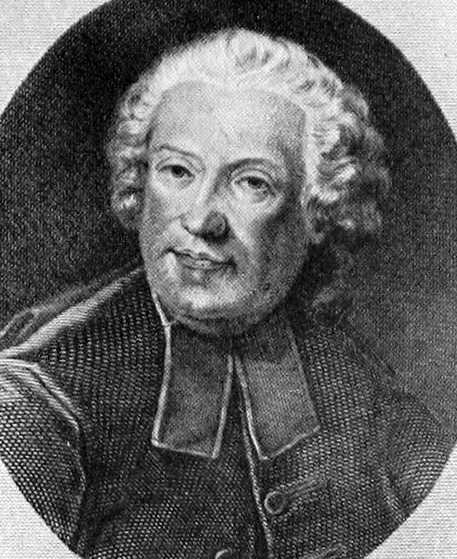
Pietro Metastasio

L'impresario delle Isole Canarie (The impresario from the Canary Islands), also known as L'impresario delle Canarie or Dorina e Nibbio, is a satirical opera intermezzo libretto attributed to Metastasio (Pietro Antonio Domenico Trapassi), written in 1724 to be performed between the acts of Metastasio's opera seria Didone abbandonata. The first performance of the work was on February 1, 1724, in Naples, Italy, at Teatro San Bartolomeo. The first composer to set this libretto to music was Domenico Sarro, also known by the name Sarri, who also revised the work in 1730. The role of Dorina was first sung by the contralto Santa Marchesini, and Nibbio by the basso buffo singer Gioacchino Corrado. Later versions of this libretto appear with the titles L'impresario, L'impresario e la cantante and others.

== Plot ==
The following is the plot as in the 1724 libretto. Later versions are different but all maintain the basic comic situation.

Persons: Dorina, an opera singer; Nibbio, an impresario from the Canary Islands; maids, wardrobe assistants

Part I (Dorina's House) to be performed between the first and second act of the opera Didone abbandonata.

Dorina waits impatiently for the visit of a foreign impresario. She vents her frustration at her maid at not finding the appropriate audition piece which is modern enough and embellishes every word with ornamentation. Nibbio enters, and proves to be interested more in a conquest than in art. He tries to convince the reluctant Dorina to sing for him. Nibbio forces Dorina to listen to a self-composed Cantata, proving Nibbio to be a dilettante. Dorina, feigning another appointment, escapes.

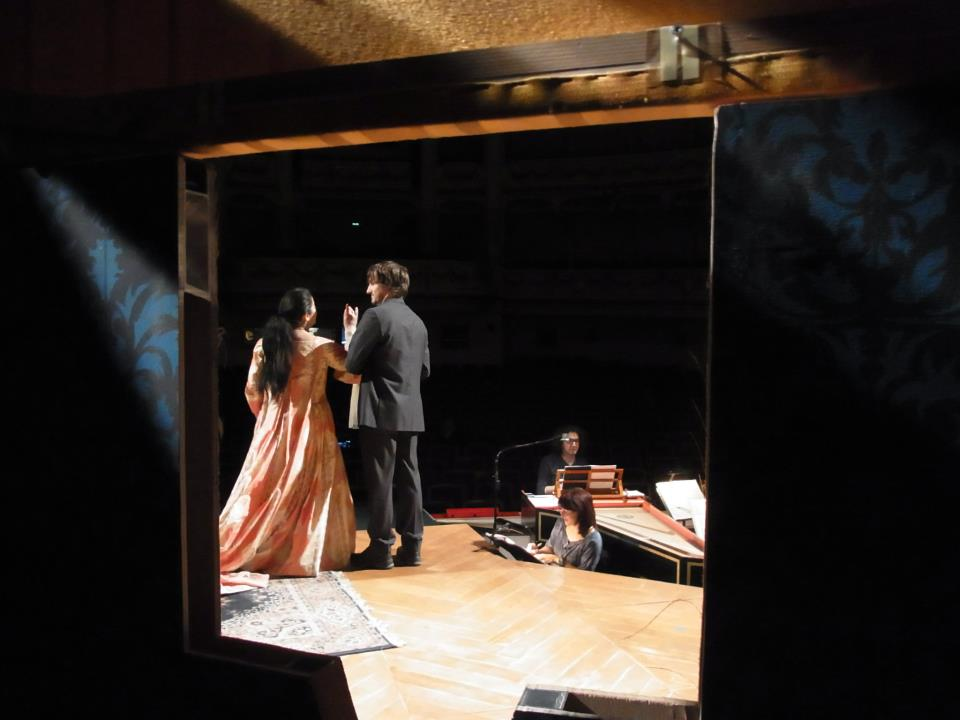
Sarro's Dorina e Nibbio at the Semperoper in Dresden with Pavol Kuban (Nibbio) and Gala El Hadidi (Dorina), Felice Venanzoni (conductor)

Part II (A dressing room of a theatre) to be performed between the second and third act of the opera Didone abbandonata.

Dorina is trying on a costume and upbraids her sloppy wardrobe assistants. Nibbio arrives. Dorina laments the hardships of performing before a harsh audience. Nibbio convinces Dorina to sing an excerpt from Cleopatra. While he applauds her performance, Nibbio is disappointed that the dramatic recitative sung by Dorina is not followed by an 'exit aria', such as the typically flashy 'butterfly' or 'ship' arias of the time. He promptly provides a live example of such an aria. Dorina hopes to get rid of Nibbio by listing preposterous demands for her contract (always leading roles of Prima Donna, librettos written by friends, a permanent supply of ice cream, coffee, chocolate and at least two presents weekly). She is even more suspicious of Nibbio's intentions when he accepts all her demands readily. The intermezzo ends without Nibbio having achieved his goal.

== Reception ==
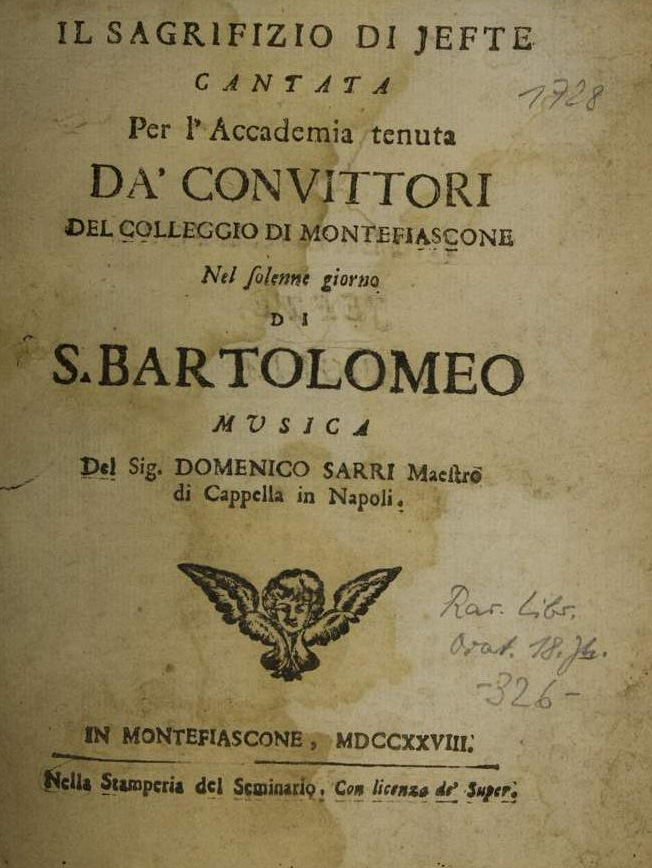
Sarro – Il sagrifizio di Jefte – title page

L'impresario is Metastasio's single venture in this comic genre. Inspired possibly by Girolamo Gigli's La Dirindina (1715) and certainly by the composer Benedetto Marcello's tirade against the failing standards of operatic art in his Teatro alla Moda (1720), Metastasio takes the theme of opera performance one step further. In his letters he always complained of the sloppy and unartistic habits of singers, musicians, theatre-impresarios and others involved with opera production. In his intermezzo, Metastasio gives Dorina (representing the art as it should be) most of his biting criticism, while Nibbio gets to utter most of the foolish text (art as it is). Dorina complains about awful 'modern' composers that are only interested in ornamentation; Nibbio utters his belief that texts are not important, because an audience 'has lots to catch up on' during the performance, and could not care less about meaning. Metastasio's text became wildly popular and was also composed by Tomaso Albinoni in 1725, Chiocchetti in 1726, Giuseppe Maria Orlandini, Leonardo Leo in 1741 and Giovanni Battista Martini in 1744.

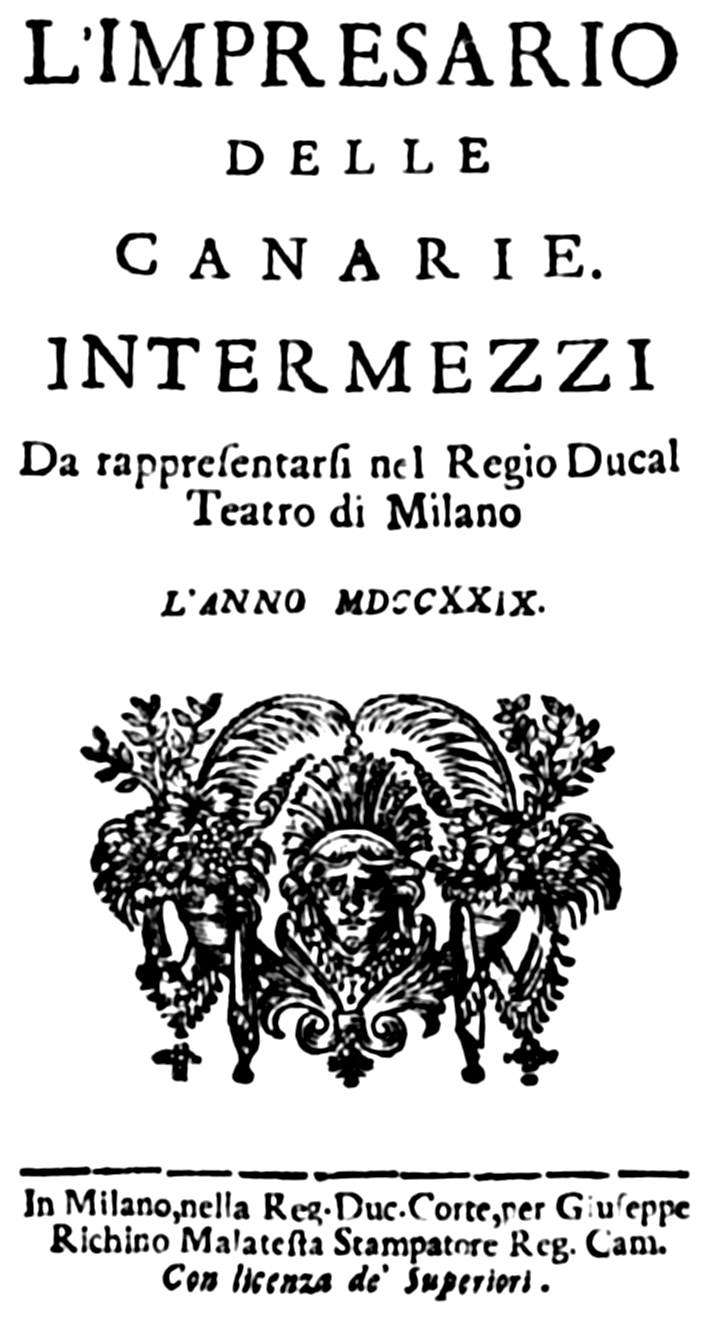
Tomaso Albinoni: L'impresario delle Canarie, title page of the libretto; Milan 1728

The intermezzo was heard in different versions all over Europe. Orlandini's version was performed in Copenhagen, Sarro's in London in 1737. Leonardo Leo's version was performed in Vienna (1747), Potsdam (1748). L'impresario delle Isole Canarie may have been Metastasio's single venture into comic opera, but it had far reaching influence. Carlo Goldoni quotes many instances of this intermezzo in his Impresario from Smyrna as well as his La bella Veritá (1762). Ranieri de' Calzabigi, (who wrote the libretto to Gluck's Orfeo), wrote L'opera seria in 1769. Giovanni Bertati's L'opera nuova (1781). Giambattista Casti's Prima la musica poi le parole (1786) and Donizetti's Le convenienze ed inconvenienze teatrali followed in 1827.

== Extant versions ==
There are currently only two versions of this intermezzo that have survived to modern day as musical manuscripts: Sarro's version, which can be found in Naples, at the Conservatorio San Pietro a Majella, and Giambattista Martini's version, which is located in the library of the Conservatorio Giovanni Battista Martini in Bologna.

The Italian composer Lucia Ronchetti wrote from 2012 until 2014 three works based on this libretto combined with Metastasio's letters and text from his Didone abbandonata. Mise en Abyme, Sub-plot and Contrascena

== Metastasio attribution ==
The new complete edition of Metastasio's libretti by Anna Laura Bellini does not include L'impresario, as there is no mention of this work in Metastasio's letters or writings, and attribution merely by secondary sources is not secure. Eytan Pessen in his article about this work in his edition for the Semperoper Dresden accepts the doubtfulness of this attribution, but notes that "the tight and clear dramaturgy and dramatic economy of the piece are consistent with Metastasio's writing, and of a higher level than the usual farcical libretto of other contemporary intermezzos. While superficially the work is of the usual stock love and conquest genre, close inspection reveal it to be a profound look at the meaning of theater and especially musical theater of the time."

== Discography ==
- L'impresario delle Canarie by Domenico Sarro (Nibbio, 1992) Bongiovanni Gatti, Mingardo, Catalucci
- L'impresario delle Canarie by Giambattista Martini (Piero Santi, 1959) Maria Luisa Gavioli, soprano (Dorina), Otello Borgonovo, baryton (Nibbio), I Commendianti in musica della Cetra (Compagnie du Théâtre musical de chambre de Villa Olmo), Piero Santi (1959)
- La Dirindina - Il Maestro di cappella - L'impresario delle canarie Bongiovanni, B00A8N9RR6

== Modern performances ==
- Barga 1979 (Domenico Sarro)
- Staatsoper Stuttgart 1993 (Domenico Sarro)
- Teatro Leal (Canary Islands) 1989 (Domenico Sarro)
- Teatro Messina 1997 (Giambattista Martini)
- Bochumer Symphoniker 2004 (Domenico Sarro, Padre Martini)
- Venice Biennale, 2009 (Domenico Sarro)
- Austin, Texas, 2011 (Domenico Sarro)
- Semperoper Dresden 2012–2013 (Domenico Sarro)
- Semperoper Dresden 2014 (Giambattista Martini)

== Online sources ==
- Libretto of a version performed in Potsdam, Italian and German; Library of Congress
- Libretto in Italian and English (London, Haymarket), Library of Congress
- Libretto in Italian from Vienna, Library of Congress
- Italian Libretto
