= Artamene =

Artamene was an opera in three acts by Tomaso Albinoni set to a libretto by Bartolomeo Vitturi. Composed in 1740, it premiered in Venice at the Teatro San Angelo in the 1741 carnival season. It was Albinoni's last opera. The music is lost.

== Sources ==
- Talbot, Michael (2001). "Albinoni, Tomaso Giovanni [Zuane]". Grove Music Online (8th ed.). Oxford University Press. doi:10.1093/gmo/9781561592630.article.00461. ISBN 978-1-56159-263-0. (subscription required)
