= Oskar Rieding =

German violinist, music teacher and composer

Oskar Rieding (29 June 1846 – 7 July 1916) was a German violinist, teacher of music, and composer.

Oskar Rieding was born in Banie, Pomerania, now Poland. attended first the recently founded Academy of Musical Arts in Berlin, and later the Leipzig Conservatory. At the end of the 1860s he moved to Vienna, but in 1871 the conductor Hans Richter, at that time musical director of the National Theatre in Budapest, appointed Rieding to the orchestra's first violin section. He remained there for thirty-two years, from 1884 onwards in the National Opera House. He composed some violin concertos and many pieces for violin and piano. Many of these pieces are appropriate for intermediate-level violin students, and they are still studied and performed by violin students today. After his retirement in 1903, he lived in Celje, Austria-Hungary, now Slovenia, continuing his activities as teacher, composer, and performer, until his death there in 1916.

== Main works ==
His better-known works include:

- Concerto in B minor for Violin and Piano Op. 35 (1909)
- Concerto in D major for Violin and Piano Op. 36
- Concertino in G for Violin and Piano Op. 24
- Gypsies' March Op. 23 No. 2, for Violin and Piano
- Concertino in A Minor for Violin and Piano in Hungarian style Op. 21
- Rondo
