= Zenobia (Albinoni) =

1694 opera by Tomaso Albinoni

- Opera by Tomaso Albinoni
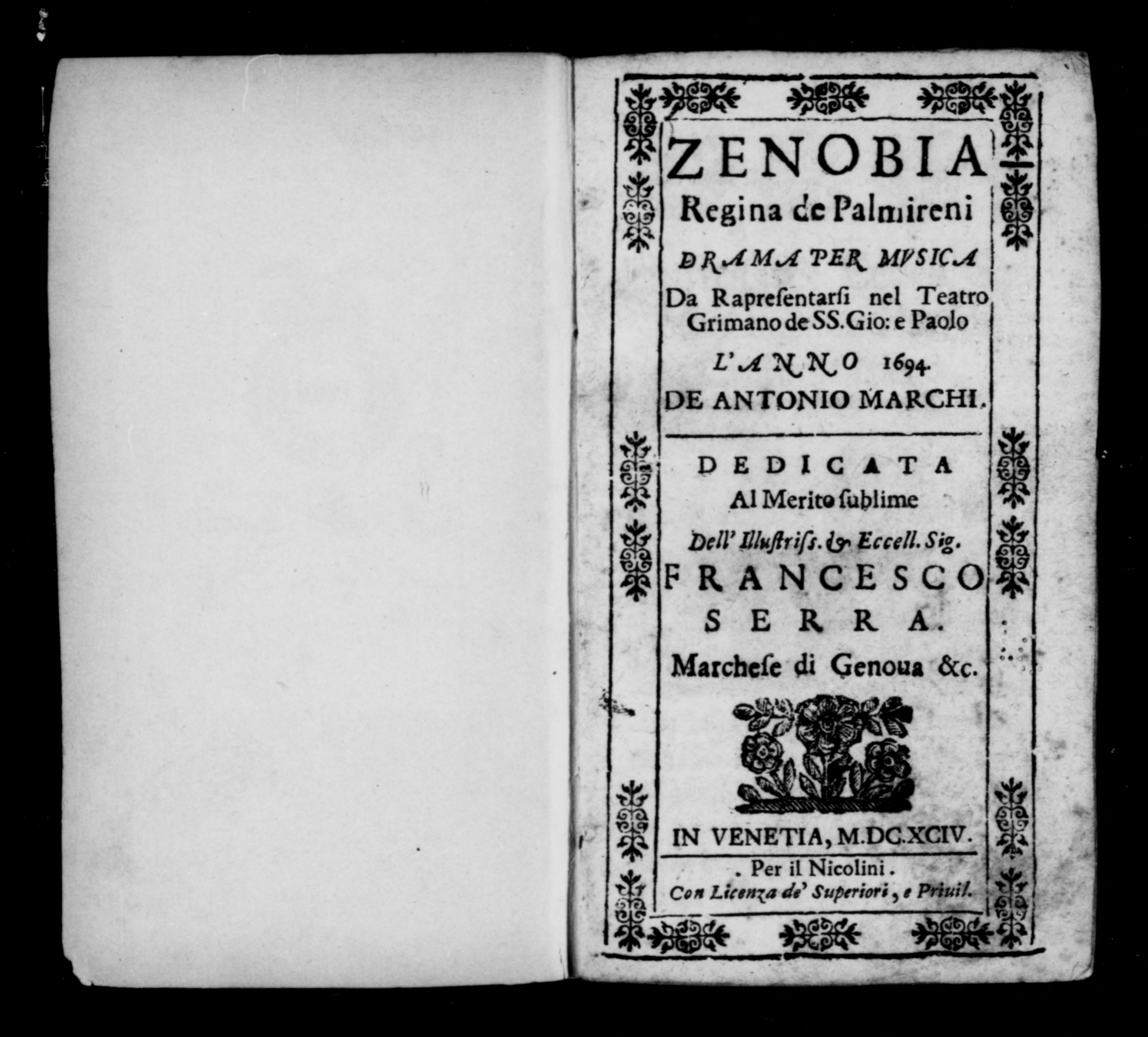
- Frontispiece
- Librettist: Antonio Marchi
- Language: Italian
- Based on: Didone abbandonata
- Premiere: 1694; Teatro Santi Giovanni e Paolo, Venice

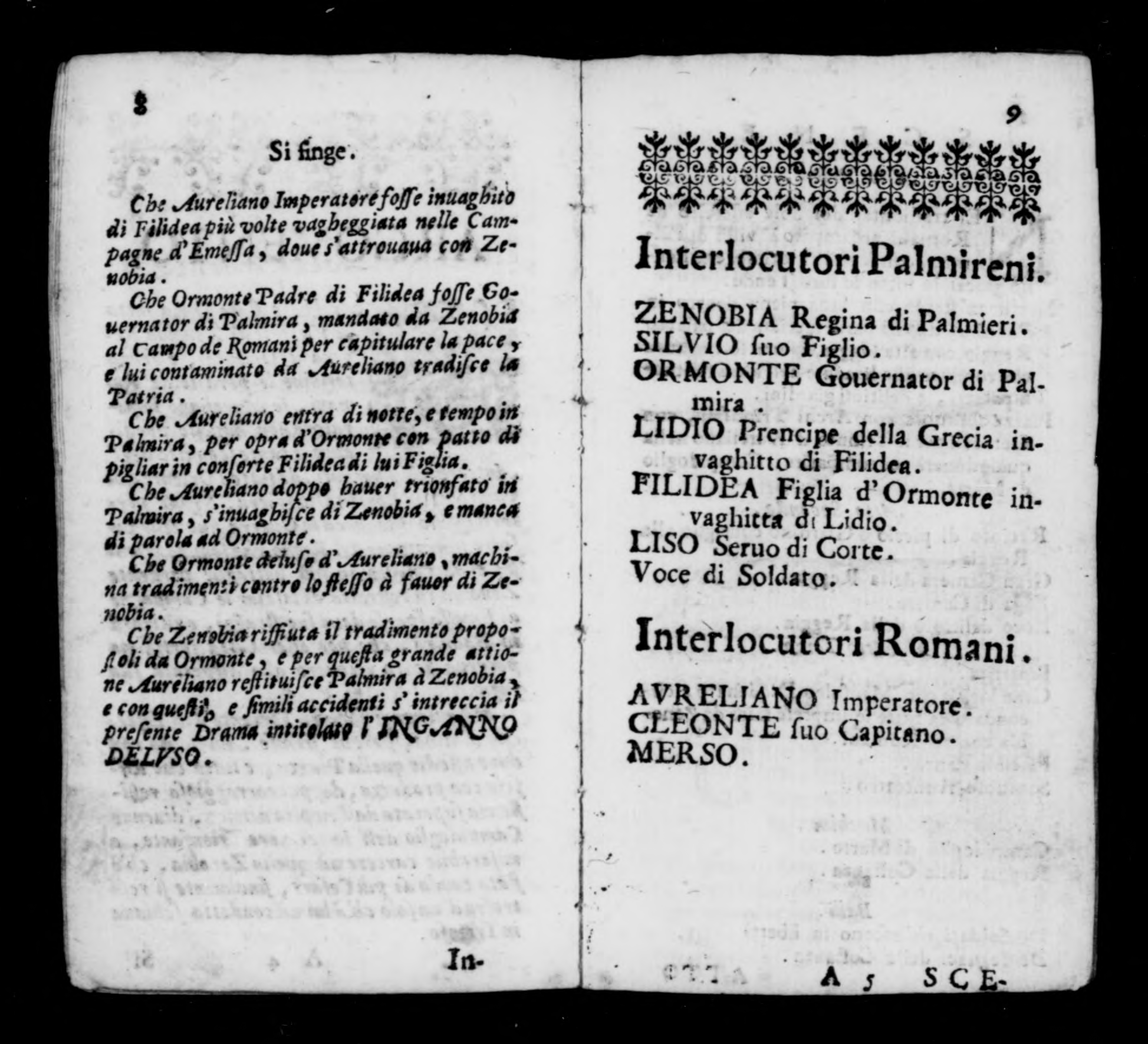
Roles in Albinoni’s ‘Zenobia’

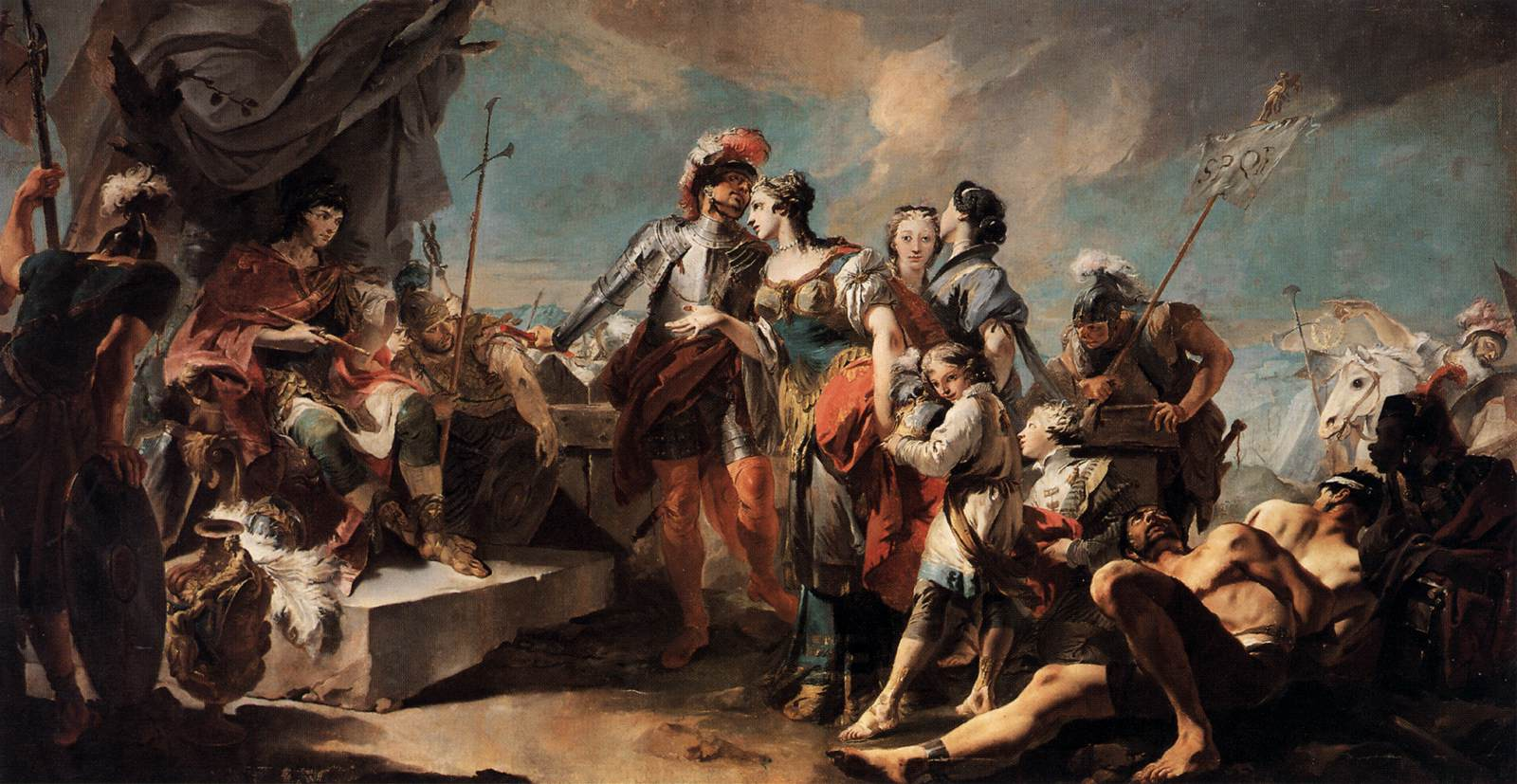
Zenobia before Emperor Aurelian, by Giovanni Battista Tiepolo

Zenobia, regina de’ Palmireni (Zenobia, Queen of the Palmyrans) is an opera in three acts by Tomaso Albinoni with a libretto by Antonio Marchi. It was Albinoni’s first opera, written when he was only 23, and was first performed at the 1694 carnival at the Teatro Santi Giovanni e Paolo in Venice. The work was popular and performances continued for several weeks. Albinoni was also the first composer to write an opera on the theme of Zenobia.

== Action ==
Zenobia (soprano), queen of Palmyra, has been defeated by the Roman emperor Aureliano (alto) because of the treachery of the governor of Palmyra, Ormonte (tenor), who hopes to marry his daughter Filidea (soprano) to the emperor. Zenobia refuses to submit to him, even when he offers to marry her. Infuriated, Aureliano decides to put Zenobia and her son to death, but when he overhears Ormonte offer to kill him and Zenobia refuses, he thinks better of it. Instead, Aureliano restores Zenobia to her throne. Ormonte is exiled and unity and order restored.

The above Happy ending is contradictory to the facts of recorded history. Zenobia was taken as a captive to Rome, some sources state that she was ultimately beheaded, others that Aurelian spared her life and allowed her to live as private citizen. In either case, unlike in the opera, Zenobia's throne was irrevocably lost and her kingdom annexed to the Roman Empire.

== Style ==
Marchi’s libretto did not give his characters great emotional presence and offered little insight into their motivations. Albinoni was an experienced writer of instrumental music but a newcomer to opera; the sung music he wrote consisted mostly of standard da capo arias which overall lacked great dramatic power. The arias are generally short to keep the action moving and provide interest through contrast.

== Modern revival ==
The opera’s first modern performance was at the Damascus Opera House in 2008. It was also performed at La Fenice in Venice in 2018.
