= 12 Concerti a cinque (Albinoni) =

1722 musical works collection

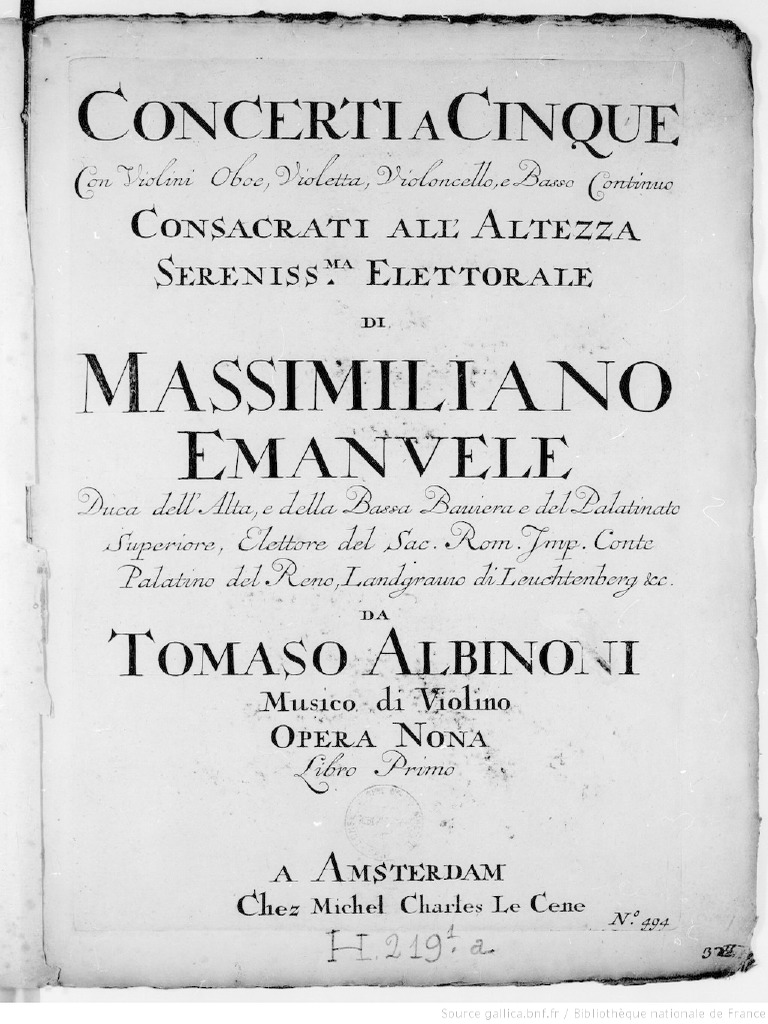
Title page of 12 Concerti a cinque, op. 9.

12 Concerti a cinque (op. 9) is a collection of concertos by the Italian composer Tomaso Albinoni, published in 1722.

Concerto for oboe in D minor, Op. 9, No. 2 - I. Allegro e non presto (3:50)

Concerto for oboe in D minor, Op. 9, No. 2 - II. Adagio (4:18)

Concerto for oboe in D minor, Op. 9, No. 2 - III. Allegro (3:25)

Concerto for 2 Oboes in F Major, op. 9 No. 3 – I. Allegro

Concerto for 2 Oboes in F Major, op. 9 No. 3 – II. Adagio

Concerto for 2 Oboes in F Major, op. 9 No. 3 – III. Allegro
Performed by the Advent Chamber Orchestra with oboists Humbert Lucarelli and Edino Biaggi

Oboe Concerto, Op. 9, no 5 – 1. Allegro
Performed by
Camden, Anthony (oboe)
London Virtuosi
Georgiadis, John (Conductor)
Courtesy of NAXOS

The most famous piece from Albinoni's Opus 9 is the Concerto in D minor for oboe (Opus 9, Number 2). It is known for its slow movement. This concerto is probably the second best-known work of Albinoni after the Adagio in G minor (which was actually written by musicologist and Albinoni biographer Remo Giazotto purportedly based on a fragment by Albinoni).

The concertos were dedicated to Maximilian II Emanuel, Elector of Bavaria, and were first published by Michel-Charles Le Cène in Amsterdam. It is possible, but not certain, that they were written in the Elector's court during a 1722 visit there by Albinoni during performances of his theatrical compositions. These are perhaps his most recognizable works.

== The 12 concertos ==
- Concerto for violin in B♭ major, Op. 9, No. 1 (I. Allegro, II. Adagio, III. Allegro)
- Concerto for oboe in D minor, Op. 9, No. 2 (I. Allegro e non presto, II. Adagio, III. Allegro)
- Concerto for 2 oboes in F major, Op. 9, No. 3 (I. Allegro, II. Adagio, III. Allegro)
- Concerto for violin in A major, Op. 9, No. 4 (I. Allegro, II. Adagio, III. Allegro)
- Concerto for oboe in C major, Op. 9, No. 5 (I. Allegro, II. Adagio, III. Allegro)
- Concerto for 2 oboes in G major, Op. 9, No. 6 (I. Allegro, II. Adagio, III. Allegro)
- Concerto for violin in D major, Op. 9, No. 7 (I. Allegro, II. Andante e sempre piano, III. Allegro)
- Concerto for oboe in G minor, Op. 9, No. 8 (I. Allegro, II. Adagio, III. Allegro)
- Concerto for 2 oboes in C major, Op. 9, No. 9 (I. Allegro, II. Adagio, III. Allegro)
- Concerto for violin in F major, Op. 9, No. 10 (I. Allegro, II. Adagio, III. Allegro)
- Concerto for oboe in B♭ major, Op. 9, No. 11 (I. Allegro, II. Adagio, III. Allegro)
- Concerto for 2 oboes in D major, Op. 9, No. 12 (I. Allegro, II. Adagio, III. Allegro)
