= Violin Concerto in E major (Bach) =

Concerto by Johann Sebastian Bach

- BWV 1042
- by J. S. Bach
- Composed: 1717–1723
- Movements: 3
- Instrumental: Violin; strings; continuo

Violin Concerto in E major, BWV 1042
I. Allegro

II. Adagio

III. Allegro assai
Performed by the Advent Chamber Orchestra with violinist Jacques Israelievitch

The Violin Concerto in E major, BWV 1042, is a violin concerto by Johann Sebastian Bach. It is based on the three-movement Venetian concerto model, albeit with a few unusual features; each movement has "un-Italian characteristics".

The piece has three movements:

1. Allegro, meter of, in ritornello form in E major
2. Adagio, meter of 3/4, with a ground bass in C-sharp minor
3. Allegro assai, meter of 3/8, with an overall structure of a rondo in E major

While there are two 18th-century scores, neither is autographed; however, Bach re-used the concerto as the model for his Harpsichord Concerto in D major, BWV 1054, found in his 1737–39 autographed manuscript of these works. The concerto is thought to have been written when Bach was working for the court of Köthen or when Bach was in Leipzig.
