= Tomaso Albinoni =

Italian composer (1671–1751)

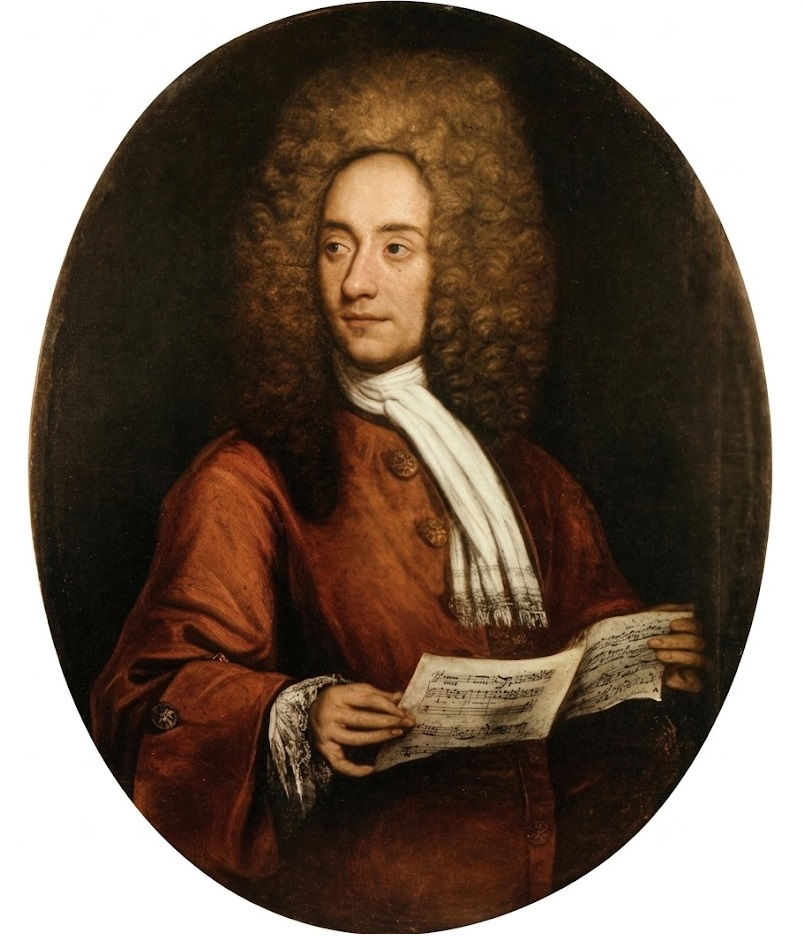
- Born: June 8, 1671; Venice, Republic of Venice
- Died: January 17, 1751 (aged 79); Venice, Republic of Venice
- Works: List of compositions by Tomaso Albinoni

Tomaso Giovanni Albinoni (8 June 1671 – 17 January 1751) was an Italian composer of the Baroque era. His output includes operas, concertos, sonatas for one to six instruments, sinfonias, and solo cantatas. While famous in his day as an opera composer, he is known today for his instrumental music, especially his concertos. He is best remembered today for a work called "Adagio in G minor", attributed to him but largely written by Remo Giazotto, a 20th-century musicologist and composer, who was a cataloguer of the works of Albinoni.

== Biography ==
Albinoni was born in Venice, at the time part of the Republic of Venice, but now in Italy. His father was Antonio Albinoni, a wealthy paper merchant. Tomaso studied violin and singing; in 1694, he dedicated his Opus 1 to the fellow-Venetian, Cardinal Pietro Ottoboni (grand-nephew of Pope Alexander VIII). His first opera, Zenobia, regina de Palmireni, was produced in Venice in 1694. Albinoni was possibly employed in 1700 as a violinist to Charles IV, Duke of Mantua, to whom he dedicated his Opus 2 collection of instrumental pieces. In 1701 he wrote his hugely popular suites Opus 3, and dedicated that collection to Ferdinando de' Medici, Grand Prince of Tuscany.

In 1705, he married Margherita Rimondi. At the ceremony, Antonino Biffi, the maestro di cappella of San Marco was a witness, and evidently was a friend of Albinoni. The Albinonis had six children but their names are not recorded.

Albinoni achieved his early fame as an opera composer in many cities in Italy, including Venice, Genoa, Bologna, Mantua, Udine, Piacenza, and Naples. During this time, he was also composing instrumental music in abundance: prior to 1705, he mostly wrote trio sonatas and violin concertos, but between then and 1719 he wrote solo sonatas and concertos for oboe.

Unlike most contemporary composers, he appears never to have sought a post at either a church or noble court, but rather had independent means through which he could afford to compose music without a salaried position. In 1722, Maximilian II Emanuel, Elector of Bavaria, to whom Albinoni had dedicated a set of twelve concertos, invited him to direct two of his operas in Munich. Part of Albinoni's work was lost in World War II with the destruction of the Dresden State Library. As a result, little is known of his life and music after the mid-1720s.

Around 1740, a collection of Albinoni's violin sonatas was published in France as a posthumous work, and scholars long presumed that meant that Albinoni had died by that time. However, it appears he lived on in Venice in obscurity; a record from the parish of San Barnaba indicates Tomaso Albinoni died in Venice in 1751, of diabetes mellitus. He was 79 years old.

== Music and influence ==
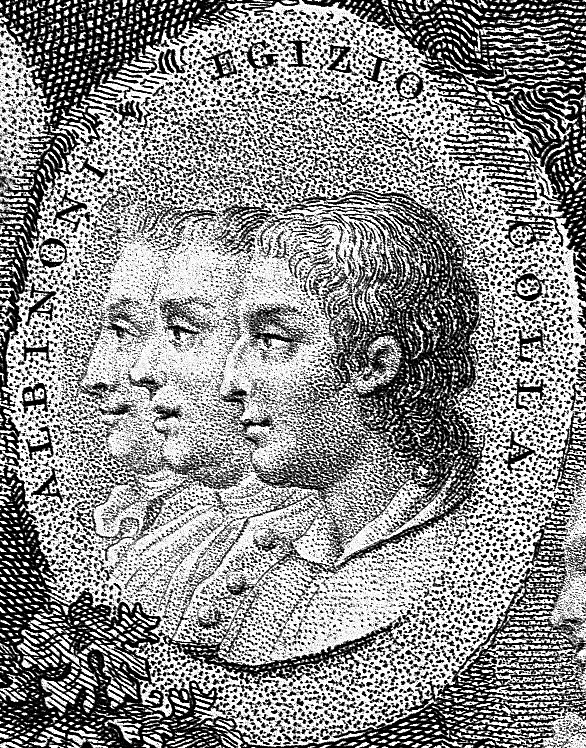
Engraving of Italian composers Tomaso Albinoni, Domenico Gizzi (Egizio) and Giuseppe Colla by Pietro Bettelini, after a drawing by Luigi Scotti

Most of his operatic works have been lost - either because they were never published or because they were destroyed. However, nine collections of instrumental works were published. These met with considerable success and consequent reprints. He is therefore today better known as a composer of instrumental music (99 sonatas, 59 concerti and 9 sinfonie). In his lifetime these works were compared favourably with those of Arcangelo Corelli and Antonio Vivaldi. His nine collections published in Italy, Amsterdam, and London were either dedicated to or sponsored by an impressive list of southern European nobility. Albinoni wrote at least fifty operas, of which twenty-eight were produced in Venice between 1723 and 1740. Albinoni himself claimed 81 operas (naming his second-to-last opera, in the libretto, as his 80th). In spite of his enormous operatic output, today he is most noted for his instrumental music, especially his oboe concerti (from 12 Concerti a cinque op. 7 and, most famously, 12 Concerti a cinque op. 9). He is the first Italian known to employ the oboe as a solo instrument in concerti (c. 1715, in his op. 7) and publish such works, although earlier concerti featuring solo oboe were probably written by German composers such as Telemann or Händel. In Italy, Alessandro Marcello published his well-known oboe concerto in D minor a little later, in 1717. Albinoni also employed the instrument often in his chamber works and operas.

His instrumental music attracted great attention from Johann Sebastian Bach, who never visited Italy but had access to Italian music, particularly when working in Weimar for the ducal court. Bach wrote at least two fugues on Albinoni's themes (Fugue in A major on a theme by Tomaso Albinoni, BWV 950, and Fugue in B minor on a theme by Tomaso Albinoni, BWV 951) and frequently used his basses for harmonic exercises for his pupils.

The famous Adagio in G minor, the subject of many modern recordings, is thought by some to be a musical hoax composed by Remo Giazotto. However, a discovery by musicologist Muska Mangano, Giazotto's last assistant before his death, has cast some doubt on that belief. Among Giazotto's papers, Mangano discovered a modern but independent manuscript transcription of the figured bass portion, and six fragmentary bars of the first violin, "bearing in the top right-hand corner a stamp stating unequivocally the Dresden provenance of the original from which it was taken". This provides support for Giazotto's account that he did base his composition on an earlier source.
