= Adrian Boult discography =

The English conductor Sir Adrian Boult was a prolific recording artist. Unlike many musicians, he felt at home in the recording studio and actually preferred working without an audience. His recording career ran from November 1920, when working with Diaghilev's Ballets Russes he recorded the ballet music, The Good-Humoured Ladies, to December 1978, when he made his final recording of music by Hubert Parry.

A discography of Boult recordings was compiled by Mike Ashman and published in Records and Recording, July 1974. A further discography by Nigel Simeone was published in Sir Adrian Boult: Companion of Honour, 1980, Midas Books. A third, A Boult Discography, compiled by Alan Sanders, was published by The Gramophone in 1981. The following list draws on the first two of these, and on record companies' catalogues and back numbers of The Gramophone. It consists chiefly of Boult's studio recordings. Since his death, some recordings of his live concerts have been released by the BBC and others, and details of these are given below, where known.

The following abbreviations are used in the list:

- BBCMM – BBC Music Magazine Compact Disk (CD). The magazine includes a CD with each issue.
- BBCSO – BBC Symphony Orchestra
- HMV – His Master's Voice
- LPO – London Philharmonic Orchestra
- LSO – London Symphony Orchestra
- NPO – New Philharmonia Orchestra
- PPO – Philharmonic Promenade Orchestra. This was a pseudonym for the London Philharmonic, adopted for contractual reasons. Many of Boult's recordings in the 1950s and 60s for the Pye Nixa and the Top Rank labels were made with the PPO.
- RPO – Royal Philharmonic Orchestra
- WRC – World Record Club: a subsidiary label owned by EMI in the 1950s–70s

== Recordings, listed alphabetically by composer ==
- Alford
  - Colonel Bogey, march: LPO, WRC, 1968
- Arne
  - Rule, Britannia!: BBCSO, HMV, 1937
- Arnold
  - English Dances Sets I + II: LPO, Decca, 1958
- Auber
  - Masaniello Overture: BBCSO, HMV, 1935
- C.P.E. Bach
  - Symphony No. 3: LPO, HMV, 1957
- Bach
  - Brandenburg Concertos 1–6: LPO, EMI, 1974
  - Klavier Concerto in C BWV 1061: Artur Schnabel, LSO, HMV, 1937
  - Mass in B minor: Qui Sedes and Agnus Dei: Kathleen Ferrier, LPO, Decca, 1953
  - St John Passion: All is fulfilled: Ferrier, LPO, Decca, 1953
  - St Matthew Passion: Grief for sin: Ferrier, LPO, Decca, 1953
  - Suite No. 3 BWV 1068: BBCSO, HMV, 1934
  - Violin Sonata No. 6 BWV 1019, Prelude (arr. Pick-Mangianalli): BBCSO, HMV, 1934
  - Fantasia and Fugue in C minor (arr. Elgar): LPO, HMV, 1974
  - The Wise Virgins (arr. Walton): LPO, Decca, 1955
- Sergei Barsukov
  - Piano Concerto No. 2, Barsukov, LPO, Everest, 1967
- Bartók
  - Divertimento for String Orchestra: PPO, Pye Nixa, 1957
  - Music for Strings, Percussion and Celesta: PPO, Pye Nixa, 1957
- Bax
  - The Garden of Fand: LPO, Lyrita, 1972
  - Mediterranean: LPO, Lyrita, 1972
  - Northern Ballad No. 1: LPO, Lyrita, 1972
  - November Woods: LPO Lyrita, 1968
  - Tintagel
    - LPO, Decca, 1955
    - LPO, Lyrita, 1972
- Beethoven
  - Coriolan Overture
    - BBCSO, HMV 2101, 1934
    - NPO, HMV, 1971
    - PPO, Top Rank, 1962
  - Egmont Overture
    - BBCSO, HMV, 1933
    - PPO, Top Rank, 1959
  - Fidelio Overture: PPO, Top Rank, 1962
  - Leonora No. 3 Overture: PPO, Top Rank, 1962
  - Piano Concerto No. 3: Solomon, BBCSO, HMV, 1942
  - Romance No. 2 in F: Hyman Bress, LPO, WRC, 1968
  - Symphony No. 3: PPO, Top Rank, 1962
  - Symphony No. 5: PPO, Top Rank, 1959
  - Symphony No. 6
    - PPO, Top Rank, 1959
    - LPO, HMV, 1978
  - Symphony No. 7: PPO, Top Rank, 1962
  - Symphony No. 8: BBCSO, HMV, 1932
  - The Ruins of Athens, Overture and Turkish March: Philharmonia, HMV, 1959
  - Violin Concerto
    - Ruggiero Ricci, LPO, Decca, 1953
    - Josef Suk, NPO, HMV, 1971
- Berg
  - Lyric Suite – three movements for string orchestra: BBCSO, BBC, 1966 (live recording)
- Berlioz
  - Beatrice and Benedict Overture: PPO, Pye Nixa, 1960
  - Benvenuto Cellini Overture: PPO, Pye Nixa, 1960
  - Le Corsaire Overture: PPO, Pye Nixa, 1960
  - Les francs-juges Overture
    - BBCSO, HMV, 1937
    - PPO, Pye Nixa, 1960
  - Rob Roy Overture: PPO, Pye Nixa, 1960
  - Le Roi Lear Overture
    - BBCSO, HMV, 1937
    - PPO, Pye Nixa, 1960
  - Roman Carnival Overture
    - BBCSO, HMV, 1933
    - PPO, Pye Nixa, 1960
  - Waverley: Overture: PPO, Pye Nixa, 1960
- Bizet
  - Petite Suite: Philharmonia, BBC, 1964 (live recording)
- Bliss
  - Music for Strings
    - BBCSO, HMV, 1937
    - LPO, HMV, 1974
  - Piano Concerto, 2 recordings with Solomon:
    - New York Philharmonic, world premiere performance, 10 June 1939
    - studio recording, Royal Liverpool Philharmonic, January 1943
  - Rout: Stella Power, British Symphony Orchestra, HMV, 1926
- Borodin
  - Prince Igor, Polovtsian March: BBCSO, HMV, 1937
- Brahms
  - Academic Festival Overture
    - LPO, HMV, 1951
    - PPO, Pye Nixa, 1956
    - LPO, WRC, 1968
    - LPO, HMV, 1973
  - Alto Rhapsody
    - Monica Sinclair, PPO, Pye Nixa, 1958
    - Janet Baker, London Philharmonic Choir, LPO, HMV 1971
  - Hungarian Dances 17 and 18: LPO, HMV, 1951
  - Hungarian Dances 19, 20 and 21: BBCSO, HMV, 1939
  - Piano Concerto No. 1: Wilhelm Backhaus, BBCSO, HMV, 1933
  - Piano Concerto No. 2
    - Artur Schnabel, BBCSO, 1936
    - Louis Kentner, Philharmonia, 1959
  - Serenade No. 1
    - LPO, HMV, 1979
    - BBCSO, Intaglio, 1993
  - Serenade No. 2: LPO, HMV, 1979
  - Symphony No. 1
    - PPO, Pye Nixa, 1956
    - LPO, HMV, 1973
  - Symphony No. 2
    - PPO, Pye Nixa, 1956
    - LPO, HMV, 1971
  - Symphony No. 3
    - PPO, Pye Nixa, 1957
    - LSO, HMV, 1971
  - Symphony No. 4
    - PPO, Pye Nixa, 1956
    - LPO, HMV, 1973
  - Tragic Overture
    - BBCSO, HMV, 1933
    - PPO, Pye Nixa, 1958
    - LPO, HMV, 1971
  - Variations on a theme by Haydn: LPO, HMV, 1979
- Brian
  - Symphony No. 1: Honor Sheppard, Shirley Minty, Ronald Dowd, Roger Stalman, BBC Chorus, BBC Choral Society, BBCSO, Testament, 1966 (live recording)
- Bridge
  - Cherry Ripe: LPO, Lyrita, 1978
  - Lament for Strings: LPO, Lyrita, 1978
  - Sally in Our Alley: LPO, Lyrita, 1978
  - Sir Roger de Coverley: LPO, Lyrita, 1978
  - Suite for String Orchestra: LPO, Lyrita, 1978
- Britten
  - Peter Grimes – Four Sea Interludes and Passacaglia: LPO, Westminster/Pye, 1966 (recorded August 1956)
  - Matinées musicales: PPO, Westminster/Pye Nixa, 1959 (recorded August 1956)
  - Soirées musicales
    - PPO, Westminster/Pye Nixa, 1959 (recorded August 1956)
    - March: LPO, Lyrita, 1973
  - The Young Person's Guide to the Orchestra: LPO, Westminster/Pye (recorded August 1956)
- Bruch
  - Kol Nidrei: Bunting, LPO, WRC, 1968
  - Scottish Fantasy
    - Rabin, Philharmonia, Columbia, 1958
    - Alfredo Campoli, LPO, Decca, 1959
  - Violin Concerto No. 1
    - Mischa Elman, LPO, Decca, 1956
    - Menuhin, LSO, HMV, 1973
  - Violin Concerto No. 2: Menuhin, LSO, HMV, 1973
- Butterworth
  - Two English Idylls: LPO, Lyrita, 1967
  - A Shropshire Lad, Rhapsody
    - British Symphony Orchestra, HMV, 1921
    - Hallé Orchestra, HMV, 1942
    - LPO, Decca, 1955
  - The Banks of Green Willow
    - LPO, Decca, 1955
    - LPO, Lyrita, 1967
- Chopin
  - Piano Concerto No. 1 (arr Balakirev): Friedrich Gulda, LPO, Decca, 1954
  - Piano Sonata No. 2 – Funeral March (arr Elgar): BBCSO, HMV, 1932
- Jeremiah Clarke
  - Trumpet Voluntary: Gordon Webb, LPO, WRC, 1968
- Coates
  - The Dambusters March
    - LPO, WRC, 1968
    - NPO, Lyrita, 1976
  - From Meadow to Mayfair Suite: NPO, Lyrita, 1976
  - The Merrymakers Overture: NPO, Lyrita, 1976
  - Summer Days Suite: NPO, Lyrita, 1976
  - The Three Bears Phantasy: NPO, Lyrita, 1976
  - The Three Elizabeths Suite: NPO, Lyrita, 1976
- Davies
  - RAF March Past: LPO, WRC, 1968
- Delibes
  - Coppelia, Suite: PPO, Pye Nixa, 1956
  - Naila – Waltz (arr. Minkus):PPO, Pye Nixa, 1956
  - Sylvia, Suites: PPO, Pye Nixa, 1956
- Delius
  - Marche Caprice: LPO, Lyrita, 1973
- Dohnányi
  - Piano Concerto No. 2: Dohnanyi, RPO, HMV, 1957
  - Variations on a Nursery Theme
    - Julius Katchen, LPO, Decca, 1954
    - Ernő Dohnányi, RPO, HMV, 1957
    - Julius Katchen, LPO, Decca, 1960
- Dvořák
  - Cello Concerto Mstislav Rostropovich, RPO, HMV, 1958
- Elgar
  - The Apostles: Sheila Armstrong, Helen Watts, Robert Tear, John Carol Case, Benjamin Luxon, Clifford Grant, London Philharmonic Choir, LPO, HMV, 1974
  - Bavarian Dances
    - LPO, Decca, 1955
    - LPO, HMV, 1968
  - Caractacus – Triumphal March, LPO, HMV, 1975
  - Carillon, LPO, HMV, 1975
  - Cello Concerto
    - Pablo Casals, BBCSO, HMV, 1946
    - Paul Tortelier, LPO, HMV, 1973
  - Chanson de Matin
    - LPO, Decca, 1955
    - LPO, HMV, 1968
  - Chanson de Nuit
    - LPO, Decca, 1955
    - LPO, HMV, 1968
  - Choral Songs
    - BBC Chorus, HMV, 1982 (recorded February 1967)
  - Cockaigne
    - PPL, Westminster/Pye Nixa (recorded August 1956)
    - LPO, HMV, 1972
  - Dream Children: LPO, HMV, 1956
  - The Dream of Gerontius
    - Prelude: BBCSO, HMV, 1934
    - Helen Watts, Nicolai Gedda, Robert Lloyd, London Philharmonic Choir, NPO, 1976
  - Enigma Variations
    - BBCSO, HMV, 1936
    - LPO, HMV, 1954
    - LPO, HMV, 1962
    - LSO, HMV, 1970
  - Falstaff
    - LPO, HMV, 1951
    - PPO, Westminster/Pye Nixa, 1957 (recorded August 1956)
    - LPO, HMV, 1974
  - Overture Froissart
    - LPO, HMV, 1956
    - LPO, HMV, 1972
  - Imperial March
    - BBCSO, HMV, 1937
    - LPO, HMV, 1977
  - Overture In the South Alassio
    - LPO, HMV, 1956
    - LPO, HMV, 1972
  - Introduction and Allegro
    - BBCSO, HMV, 1937
    - LPO, HMV, 1954
    - LPO, HMV, 1973
  - The Kingdom: Margaret Price, Yvonne Minton, Alexander Young, John Shirley-Quirk, London Philharmonic Choir, LPO, HMV, 1969
  - The Music Makers: Janet Baker, London Philharmonic Choir, LPO, 1967
  - Nursery Suite: LPO, HMV, 1956
  - Polonia: LPO, 1975
  - Pomp and Circumstance Marches 1–5
    - LPO, HMV, 1956
    - LPO, HMV, 1977
  - The Sanguine Fan: LPO, 1974
  - Serenade for Strings: LPO, HMV, 1973
  - Sospiri: BBCSO, HMV, 1937
  - Symphony No. 1
    - LPO, HMV, 1950
    - LPO, Lyrita, 1968
    - LPO, HMV, 1977
  - Symphony No. 2
    - Symphony No. 2 BBCSO, HMV, 1945
    - PPO, Westminster/Pye Nixa, 1957 (recorded August 1956)
    - Scottish National Orchestra, 1964
    - LPO, Lyrita, 1968
    - LPO, HMV, 1976
  - Violin Concerto
    - Alfredo Campoli, LPO Decca, 1955
    - Yehudi Menuhin, NPO, HMV, 1966
    - Ida Haendel, LPO, HMV, 1978
  - The Wand of Youth Suites 1 and 2
    - Suite No. 1 only: LPO, HMV, 1954
    - Suites 1 and 2: LPO, HMV, 1968
- Falla
  - El Amor Brujo – Fire Dance: WRC, 1968
- Finzi
  - The Fall of the Leaf, LPO, Lyrita, 1978
  - Introit, Rodney Friend, LPO, Lyrita,
  - Nocturne, LPO, Lyrita, 1978
  - Prelude for String Orchestra, LPO, Lyrita, 1978
  - Romance for String Orchestra, LPO, Lyrita, 1978
  - A Severn Rhapsody, LPO, Lyrita, 1978
- Franck
  - Symphonic Variations
    - Anderson Tyrer, British Symphony Orchestra, Velvet Face 599–600, 1923
    - Clifford Curzon, LPO, Decca, 1960
  - Symphony in D minor: "London Orchestral Society Orchestra" Originally recorded for Reader's Digest, 1959
- Gershwin
  - Cuban Overture: London Philharmonic Orchestra, WRC, 1968
- Glinka
  - Russlan and Ludmilla Overture LPO, WRC, 1967
- Gluck
  - Alceste, Overture: BBCSO, HMV, 1937
- Gounod
  - O Divine Redeemer:Kirsten Flagstad, LPO, Decca, 1958
- Grainger
  - Over the Hills and far away, Children's March: LPO, Lyrita, 1973
- Grieg
  - Piano Concerto: Shura Cherkassky, LPO, WRC, 1966
- Franz Gruber
  - Silent Night: Kirsten Flagstad, LPO, Decca, 1958
- Patrick Hadley
  - One Morning in Spring – sketch for orchestra: BBCSO, BBC, (1966 live recording)
- Handel
  - Acis and Galatea: Peter Pears, Joan Sutherland, Owen Brannigan, Philomusica Orchestra, L'Oiseau Lyre-Decca, 1960
  - Judas Maccabeus – Father of Heaven: Ferrier, LPO, Decca, 1953
  - Messiah
    - He was despised; O thou that tallest: Ferrier, LPO, Decca, 1953
    - Jennifer Vyvyan, Norma Procter, George Maran, Owen Brannigan, London Philharmonic Choir, LPO, Decca, 1954
    - Joan Sutherland, Grace Bumbry, Kenneth McKellar, David Ward, London Symphony Chorus, LSO, Decca, 1961
  - Music for the Royal Fireworks: LPO, HMV, 1949
  - Organ Concertos, Op 4 Nos 1–6 and Op 7 Nos 1–6: E. Power Biggs, LPO, 1960
  - Overture in D minor (arr. Elgar): LPO, HMV, 1972
  - Samson – Return O God of Hosts: Ferrier, LPO, Decca, 1953
  - Water Music: PPO, Pye Nixa, 1956
- Holst
  - Beni Mora: LPO, Lyrita, 1972
  - Choral Symphony: Felicity Palmer, London Philharmonic Choir, LPO, HMV, 1974
  - Egdon Heath LPO Decca 1962
  - Fugal Overture LPO, Lyrita, 1968
  - Hammersmith Prelude and Scherzo LPO, Lyrita, 1972
  - Japanese Suite LSO Lyrita, 1971
  - The Hymn of Jesus BBC Chorus, BBCSO, Decca, 1962
  - The Perfect Fool Ballet Music LPO Decca
    - LPO, Decca, 1955
    - LPO, Decca, 1962
  - The Planets
    - BBCSO and chorus, HMV, 1945
    - London Philharmonic Choir, PPO, recorded 1954, Pye Nixa NLP 903, 1954
    - Vienna Academy Chorus, Vienna State Opera Orchestra, recorded Apr, 1959, Whitehall WHS 20033, 1960
    - Ambrosian Singers, NPO, recorded 21–22 Jul 1966, HMV ASD 2301, 1967
    - London Choral Society, BBCSO, recorded live 7 Sep 1973, BBCMM 359, 2013
    - Geoffrey Mitchell Choir, LPO, recorded Jul–Aug 1978 & May 1979, HMV ASD 3649, 1979
  - Scherzo: LPO, Lyrita, 1972
  - A Somerset Rhapsody: LPO, Lyrita, 1972
  - Suite in E flat Op.28 No1 – March (arr Gordon Jacob):, LPO, Lyrita, 1973
- Howells
  - Concerto for Strings: LPO, HMV. 1974
  - Elegy: NPO, Lyrita, 1976
  - Merry-Eye: NPO, Lyrita, 1976
  - Music for a Prince: NPO, Lyrita, 1976
  - Processional: LPO, Lyrita, 1978
- Humperdinck
  - Hansel and Gretel, Overture
    - British Symphony Orchestra, HMV, 1927
    - BBCSO, HMV, 1932
- Ireland
  - Concertino Pastorale: LPO, Lyrita, 1966
  - A Downland Suite: Elegy, Minuet, LPO, Lyrita, 1966
  - Epic March: LPO, Lyrita, 1966
  - The Forgotten Rite: LPO, Lyrita, 1966
  - The Holy Boy: LPO, Lyrita, 1966
  - Legend: Eric Parkin, LPO, Lyrita, 1966
  - London Overture: LPO, Lyrita, 1966
  - Mai-Dun: LPO, Lyrita, 1966
  - The Overlanders: LPO, Lyrita, 1971
  - Piano Concerto in E-flat major: Eric Parkin, LPO, Lyrita, 1968
  - Satyricon: LPO, Lyrita, 1966
  - Scherzo and Cortege from Julius Caesar: LPO, Lyrita, 1971
  - These Things Shall Be: John Carol Case, LPO, Lyrita, 1968
  - Tritons, LPO, Lyrita, 1971
- Khachaturian
  - Piano Concerto: Mindru Katz, LPO, Pye, 1959
- Lalo
  - Cello Concerto, Nelsova, LPO, Decca, 1954
- Liddell
  - Abide with me: Kirsten Flagstad, LPO, Decca, 1958
- Liszt
  - Piano Concerto No.1 in E flat, Anderson Tyrer, British Symphony Orchestra, Velvet Face 557–58, 1923
  - Fantasia on Hungarian Folktunes: Edith Farnadi, PPO, Pye Nixa, 1959
  - Totentanz, Edith Farnadi: PPO, Pye Nixa, 1959
- Litolff
  - Concerto Symphonique, 'Scherzo' From Concerto Symphonique No. 4
    - Clifford Curzon, LPO, Decca, 1960
    - Shura Cherkassky, LPO, WRC, 1969
- Mahler
  - Kindertotenlieder
    - Christa Ludwig, Philharmonia, Columbia, 1959
    - Kirsten Flagstad, Vienna Philharmonic, Decca, 1960
  - Lieder eines fahrenden Gesellen: Kirsten Flagstad, Vienna Philharmonic, Decca, 1960
  - Symphony No. 1: LPO, Top Rank, 1960
  - Symphony No. 3: Kathleen Ferrier, BBCSO, Testament (1947 live recording)
- Mendelssohn:
  - Elijah – O rest in the Lord: Norma Procter, LPO, Decca, 1955
  - The Hebrides: BBCSO, HMV, 1934
  - A Midsummer Night's Dream, Overture
    - BBCSO, HMV, 1945
    - PPO, Pye Nixa, 1957
  - A Midsummer Night's Dream, Incidental Music
    - Nocturne: BBCSO HMV, 1933
    - Wedding March BBCSO, HMV, 1945
    - Scherzo, Intermezzo, Nocturne, Wedding March, Dance of the Clowns, Fairies' March: PPO, Pye Nixa, 1957
  - Ruy Blas, Overture: BBCSO, HMV, 1935
  - Symphony No. 3 PPO Pye Nixa, 1958
  - Symphony No. 4
    - PPO, Pye Nixa 1958
    - LPO, WRC, 1968
  - Violin Concerto
    - Yehudi Menuhin, Philharmonia, HMV, 1953
    - Michael Rabin, Philharmonia, Columbia, 1958
    - Alfredo Campoli, LPO, Decca, 1959
    - Maureen Smith, LPO, WRC, 1968
- Meyerbeer
  - Le Prophète – Coronation March: BBCSO, HMV, 1937
- Moeran
  - Cello Concerto: Peers Coetmore, LPO, Lyrita, 1970
  - Overture for a Masque: LPO, Lyrita, 1970
  - Rhapsody No. 2: LPO, Lyrita, 1970
  - Sinfonietta: LPO, Lyrita, 1968
  - Symphony in G minor: NPO, Lyrita, 1975
- Monn
  - Cello Concerto - 1st movement: William Pleeth, LPO, HMV, 1957
- Mozart
  - Concerto for 2 pianos: Artur Schnabel, Karl-Ulrich Schnabel, LSO, HMV, 1937
  - Cosi fan tutte – Overture
    - BBCSO, HMV, 1934
    - BBCSO, HMV, 1939
  - Horn Concerto No. 3: Aubrey Brain, BBCSO, HMV, 1940
  - Piano Concerto No. 17: André Previn, LSO, HMV, 1974
  - Piano Concerto No. 20: Annie Fischer, Philharmonia, Columbia, 1960
  - Piano Concerto No. 23: Annie Fischer, Philharmonia, Columbia, 1960
  - Piano Concerto No. 24: André Previn, LSO, HMV, 1974
  - Der Schauspieldirektor – Overture: BBCSO DB 1969, 1934
  - Symphony No. 32: BBCSO DB 6172, 1944
  - Symphony No. 41: BBCSO DB 1966–69, 1934
  - Die Zauberflöte – Overture: LPO, T 730/ST 730, 1968
- Nicolai
  - The Merry Wives of Windsor – Overture
    - BBCSO, HMV, 1934
    - LPO, HMV, 1951
- Paganini
  - Violin Concerto No. 1: Yehudi Menuhin, LPO, HMV, 1956
- Parry
  - Blest Pair of Sirens
    - Oxford Bach Choir, LSO, HMV, 1948
    - London Philharmonic Choir and Orchestra, HMV, 1967
  - Elegy for Brahms: LPO, HMV, 1978
  - English Suite: LSO Lyrita, 1971
  - Jerusalem: Flagstad, LPO, Decca, 1958
  - Lady Radnor's Suite: LSO Lyrita, 1971
  - Overture to an unwritten tragedy: LSO, Lyrita, 1971
  - Symphonic Variations
    - LSO, Lyrita, 1971
    - LPO, HMV, 1978
  - Symphony No. 5: LPO, HMV, 1978
- Ponchielli
  - La Gioconda – Dance of the Hours: LPO, WRC, 1968
- Prokofiev
  - Lieutenant Kijé – suite: Paris Conservatoire Orchestra, Decca, 1956
  - The Love of Three Oranges – suite: LPO, Decca, 1956
  - Piano Concerto No. 1: Mindru Katz, LPO, Pye Nixa, 1959
- Rachmaninoff
  - Piano Concerto No. 1: Peter Katin, LPO, Decca, 1959
  - Piano Concerto No. 2: Clifford Curzon, LPO, Decca, 1956
  - Rhapsody on a Theme of Paganini
    - Julius Katchen, LPO, Decca, 1954
    - Julius Katchen, LPO, Decca, 1960
  - Symphony No. 2: LPO, Decca, 1966
  - Symphony No. 3: LPO, Decca, 1959
- Ravel
  - Daphnis et Chloé Suite No. 2: Philharmonia, BBC, 1964 (live performance)
  - Tzigane: Michael Rabin, Philharmonia, Columbia, 1958
- Respighi
  - Feste Romane: PPO, Westminster, 1959
  - Rossiniana: PPO, Westminster, 1959
- Rimsky-Korsakov
  - Russian Easter Festival Overture LPO, Decca, 1959
  - The Snow Maiden – Dance of the Tumblers LPO, WRC, 1967
- Rodgers
  - Guadalcanal March: LPO, WRC, 1968
- Rossini
  - La Boutique fantasque (arr. Respighi): British Symphony Orchestra, HMV, 1926
  - (See also Britten: Matinées and Soirées musicales)
- Rubbra
  - Symphony No. 7: LPO, Lyrita, 1970
- Saint-Saëns
  - Cello Concerto No. 1: Zara Nelsova, LPO, Decca, 1954
  - Danse Macabre LPO, WRC, 1968
  - Samson et Dalila – Bacchanale: BBCSO, HMV, 1933
  - Wedding Cake: LPO, WRC 1968
- Sarasate
  - Zigeunerweisen: Hyman Bress, LPO, WRC, 1968
- Scarlatti
  - The Good-humoured Ladies (arr. Tommasini.): British Symphony Orchestra, HMV, 1921
- Schubert
  - Symphony No. 4 LPO
  - Symphony No. 8 in B minor ("Unfinished"): Philharmonia, BBC, (1964 live recording)
  - Symphony No. 9 Great C major
    - BBCSO, HMV, 1935
    - LPO, Pye Nixa, 1957
    - LPO, HMV, 1972
- Schumann
  - Manfred – Overture: BBCSO, HMV, 1934
  - Piano Concerto: Shura Cherkassky, LPO, WRC, date
  - Symphony No. 1 PPO, Pye Nixa, 1957
  - Symphony No. 2 PPO, Pye Nixa, 1957
  - Symphony No. 3 PPO, Pye Nixa, 1957
  - Symphony No. 4 PPO, Pye Nixa, 1957
- Searle
  - Symphony No. 1: LPO, Decca, 1960
- Shostakovich
  - Symphony No. 6: LPO, Everest, 1967
  - Symphony No. 12: BBCSO, Intaglio, 1993
- Sibelius
  - The Bard: PPO, Pye Nixa, 1958
  - En saga: PPO, Pye Nixa, 1958
  - Finlandia: PPO, Pye Nixa, 1958
  - Lemminkainen's Return: PPO, Pye Nixa, 1958
  - Night Ride and Sunrise BBCSO DB 2795-96(-/36: PPO, Pye Nixa, 1958
  - The Oceanides
    - BBCSO, HMV, 1936
    - PPO, Pye Nixa, 1958
  - Pohjola's Daughter: PPO, Pye Nixa, 1958
  - Romance in C: BBCSO, HMV, 1940
  - The Swan of Tuonela: PPO, Pye Nixa, 1958
  - Symphony No. 7: RPO, BBC, (1963 live recording)
  - Tapiola: PPO, Pye Nixa, 1958
  - The Tempest – prelude: PPO Pye Nixa, 1958
  - Violin Concerto: Yehudi Menuhin, LPO, HMV, 1956
- Simpson
  - Symphony No. 1 LPO, HMV, 1957
- Smetana
  - The Bartered Bride – Overture; Polka; Furiant; Dance of the Comedians LPO, WRC, 1967
  - Ma Viast – Vltava LPO, WRC, 1967
- Smyth
  - Fête galante – Minuet: Light Symphony Orchestra, HMV, 1939
  - Two French Folk Melodies: Light Symphony Orchestra, HMV, 1939
- Sousa
  - Marches – El Capitan; Liberty Bell; Stars and Stripes for Ever; Washington Post: LPO, WRC, 1968
- Stamitz
  - Symphony in E flat - 1st and 2nd movement LPO, HMV, 1957
- Johann Strauss I
  - Radetzky March LPO, WRC, 1968
- Stravinsky
  - Circus Polka: LPO, WRC, 1968
- Sullivan
  - Overture di Ballo: New Symphony Orchestra of London, Reader's Digest, 1960
- Suppé
  - Boccaccio – Overture: PPO, Pye Nixa, 1958
  - Fatinitza – Overture: PPO, Pye Nixa, 1958
  - Light Cavalry – Overture PPO, Pye Nixa, 1958
  - Morning, Noon and Night in Vienna – Overture PPO, Pye Nixa, 1958
  - Poet and Peasant – Overture PPO, Pye Nixa, 1958
  - Die Schone Galathea – Overture Philharmonic Promenade Orch, Pye Nixa, 1958
- Tchaikovsky
  - Capriccio Italien: BBCSO, HMV, 1940
  - Concert Fantasia: Peter Katin, LPO, Decca, 1959
  - 1812 Overture:
    - LPO, Decca, 1952
    - Coldstream Guards Band, LPO, WRC, 1968
  - Eugene Onegin – Polonaise: BBCSO, HMV, 1937
  - Hamlet: LPO, Decca, 1952
  - Marche Slave LPO, T 683/ST 683, 1968
  - Piano Concerto No. 1: Paul Badara-Skoda, PPO, Pye Nixa, 1956
  - Romeo and Juliet
    - LPO, Pye Nixa, 1961
    - LPO, WRC, 1968
  - Serenade for Strings: BBCSO, HMV, 1940
  - Suite No. 3
    - Paris Conservatoire Orchestra, Decca, 1956
    - LPO, HMV, 1974
  - Symphony No. 3 LPO, Decca, 1956
  - Symphony No. 5 Pye Nixa, 1960
  - Symphony No. 6 "Pathétique": LPO, Pye Nixa, 1960
  - Violin Concerto
    - Mischa Elman, LPO, Decca, 1954
    - Hyman Bress, LPO, WRC, 1968
- Carl Teike
  - Old Comrades: LPO, WRC, 1958
- Traditional and Miscellaneous
  - The Battle Hymn of the Republic: LPO, WRC, 1968
  - The British Grenadiers
    - BBCSO HMV, 1937
    - LPO, WRC, 1968
  - The Coronation of Queen Elizabeth II: Coronation Choir and Orchestra, HMV, 1953
  - Jubilate: Kirsten Flagstad, LPO, Decca, 1958
  - Lillibulero: LPO, WRC, 1968
  - O Come All Ye Faithful: Kirsten Flagstad, LPO, Decca, 1958
- Vaughan Williams
  - Concerto for 2 pianos: Vitya Vronsky, Victor Babin, LPO, HMV, 1969
  - Dona Nobis Pacem London Philharmonic Choir, LPO, HMV, 1974
  - English Folk Songs Suite (arr Gordon Jacob)
    - LPO, Pye Nixa, 1954
    - Vienna State Opera Orchestra, Westminster, 1961
    - LPO, HMV, 1971
  - Fantasia on the 'Old 104th' LPO, HMV, 1970
  - Fantasia on a Theme of Thomas Tallis
    - BBCSO HMV, 1940
    - Philharmonic Promenade Orchoestra, Pye Nixa, 1954
    - Vienna State Opera Orchestra, Westminster, 1961
    - LPO, Lyrita, 1970
    - NPO, BBC [live], 1972
    - LPO, HMV, 1976
  - Flos Campi: William Primrose, BBC Chorus, Philharmonia, HMV, 1947
  - Greensleeves Fantasia
    - PPO, Pye Nixa, 1954
    - Vienna State Opera Orchestra, Westminster, 1961
    - LSO, HMV, 1970 (p 1971)
  - In the fen country: NPO, HMV, 1968
  - Job
    - BBCSO, HMV, 1946
    - LPO, Decca, 1954
    - LPO, Everest, 1958
    - LSO, HMV, 1970 (p 1971)
  - The Lark Ascending
    - Jean Pougnet, LPO, HMV, 1953
    - Hugh Bean, NPO, HMV, 1967
  - Norfolk Rhapsody
    - LPO, Pye Nixa, 1954
    - New Philharmonia, HMV, 1968
  - Old King Cole LPO, Decca, 1955
  - Partita for Double String Orchestra
    - LPO, Decca, 1960
    - LPO, HMV 1975 (p 1976)
  - The Pilgrim's Progress: John Noble, Raimund Herincx, John Carol Case, Wynford Evans, Christopher Keyte, Geoffrey Shaw, Bernard Dickerson, Sheila Armstrong, Marie Hayward, Gloria Jennings, Ian Partridge, John Shirley-Quirk, Terence Sharpe, Robert Lloyd, Norma Burrowes, Alfreda Hodgson, Joseph Ward, Richard Angas, John Elwes, Delia Wallis, Wendy Eathorne, Gerald English, London Philharmonic Choir and LPO, HMV, 1972
  - Serenade to Music
    - Festival Choir and Orchestra, HMV, 1951
    - Norma Burrowes, Sheila Armstrong, Susan Longfield, Marie Hayward, Alfreda Hodgson, Gloria Jennings, Shirley Minty, Meriel Dickinson, Ian Partridge, Bernard Dickerson, Wynford Evans, Kenneth Bowen, Richard Angas, John Carol Case, John Noble & Christopher Keyte, LPO, HMV, 1969 (p 1970)
  - Symphony No. I (A Sea Symphony)
    - Isobel Baillie, John Cameron, London Philharmonic Choir, LPO, Decca, 1954
    - Sheila Armstrong, John Carol Case, London Philharmonic Choir, LPO, HMV, 1968
  - Symphony No. 2 (A London Symphony)
    - LPO, Decca, 1952
    - LPO, HMV, 1971
  - Symphony No. 3 (Pastoral)
    - Margaret Ritchie, LPO, Decca, 1953
    - Margaret Price, NPO, HMV, 1968
  - Symphony No. 4
    - LPO, Decca, 1955
    - NPO, HMV, 1968
  - Symphony No. 5
    - LPO, Decca, 1954
    - LPO, HMV, 1970
  - Symphony No. 6
    - LSO, HMV, 1949
    - LPO, Decca, 1954
    - NPO, HMV, 1967
  - Symphony No. 7 (Sinfonia Antartica)
    - Margaret Ritchie, (superscriptions spoken by John Gielgud) LPO, Decca, 1954
    - Norma Burrowes, London Philharmonic Choir, LPO, HMV, 1970
  - Symphony No. 8
    - LPO, Decca, 1960
    - LPO, HMV, 1969
  - Symphony No. 9
    - LPO, Everest, 1960
    - LPO, HMV, 1970
  - Thanksgiving for Victory: Luton Choral Society, LPO, HMV, 1953
  - Towards the Unknown Region: Sheila Armstrong, John Carol Case, London Philharmonic Choir, LPO, HMV, 1974
  - The Wasps, incidental music
    - LPO, Decca, 1954
    - LPO, HMV, 1968
- Wagner
  - Götterdämmerung – Dawn and Siegfried's Rhine Journey; Siegfried's Funeral Music: LPO, HMV, 1973
  - Lohengrin – Preludes to Acts 1 and 3: NPO, HMV, 1972
  - Die Meistersinger
    - Prelude: BBCSO, HMV, 1933
    - Prelude and Prelude to Act 2: NPO, HMV, 1972
  - Parsifal – Good Friday Music
    - BBCSO, HMV, 1933
    - LSO, HMV, 1974
  - Siegfried – Forest Murmurs LPO, ASD 2934, 1973
  - Siegfried Idyll, LSO, HMV, 1974
  - Tannhäuser
    - Prelude: NPO, HMV, 1972
    - Prelude to Act 3 LPO, HMV, 1973
  - Tristan und Isolde – Prelude
    - BBCSO, HMV, 1933
    - NPO, HMV, 1972
  - Die Walküre – Ride of the Valkyries: LPO, HMV, 1973
- Josef Wagner
  - Under the Double Eagle LPO, WRC, 1968
- Walton
  - Belshazzar's Feast: John Noble, London Philharmonic Choir, LPO, Pye Nixa, 1954
  - Crown Imperial,
    - BBCSO, HMV, 1937
    - LPO, HMV, 1977
  - Hamlet: Funeral March, LPO, Lyrita, 1973
  - Portsmouth Point – Overture
    - BBCSO, HMV, 1937
    - LPO, Decca, 1955
    - LPO, WRC, 1968
  - Scapino: LPO, Decca, 1955
  - Siesta: Decca, 1955
  - Symphony No. 1: PPO, Westminster/Pye Nixa, 1964 (recorded August 1956)
- Weber
  - Euryanthe – Overture: BBCSO, HMV, 1937
  - Der Freischütz – Overture BBCSO, HMV, 1933
- Wieniawski
  - Violin Concerto No. 1: Michael Rabin, Philharmonia, Columbia, 1958
  - Violin Concerto No. 2: Mischa Elman, LPO, Decca, 1956
- Williamson
  - Organ Concerto: Malcolm Williamson, LPO, Lyrita, 1974
  - Violin Concerto: Yehudi Menuhin, LPO, HMV, 1972
- Wolf
  - Italian Serenade: Philharmonia, HMV, 1959
- Wolf-Ferrari
  - The Jewels of the Madonna – intermezzo: LPO, WRC, 1968
- Zimmermann
  - Anchors Away: LPO, WRC, 1968
