= Carmina Burana (Orff) =

1937 cantata by Carl Orff

- Cantata by Carl Orff
- Cover of the score showing the Wheel of Fortune
- Language: Latin; Middle High German; Old French
- Based on: 24 poems from Carmina Burana
- Premiere: 8 June 1937; Oper Frankfurt

Carmina Burana is a cantata composed in 1935 and 1936 by Carl Orff, based on 24 poems from the medieval collection Carmina Burana. Its full Latin title is Carmina Burana: Cantiones profanae cantoribus et choris cantandae comitantibus instrumentis atque imaginibus magicis ("Songs of Beuern: Secular songs for singers and choruses to be sung together with instruments and magical images"). It was first performed by the Oper Frankfurt on 8 June 1937. It is part of Trionfi, a musical triptych that also includes Catulli Carmina and Trionfo di Afrodite. The first and last sections of the piece are called "Fortuna Imperatrix Mundi" ("Fortune, Empress of the World") and start with "O Fortuna".

The autograph manuscript of the work is preserved in the Bavarian State Library, and was issued in a facsimile edition by Schott Music.

== Text ==
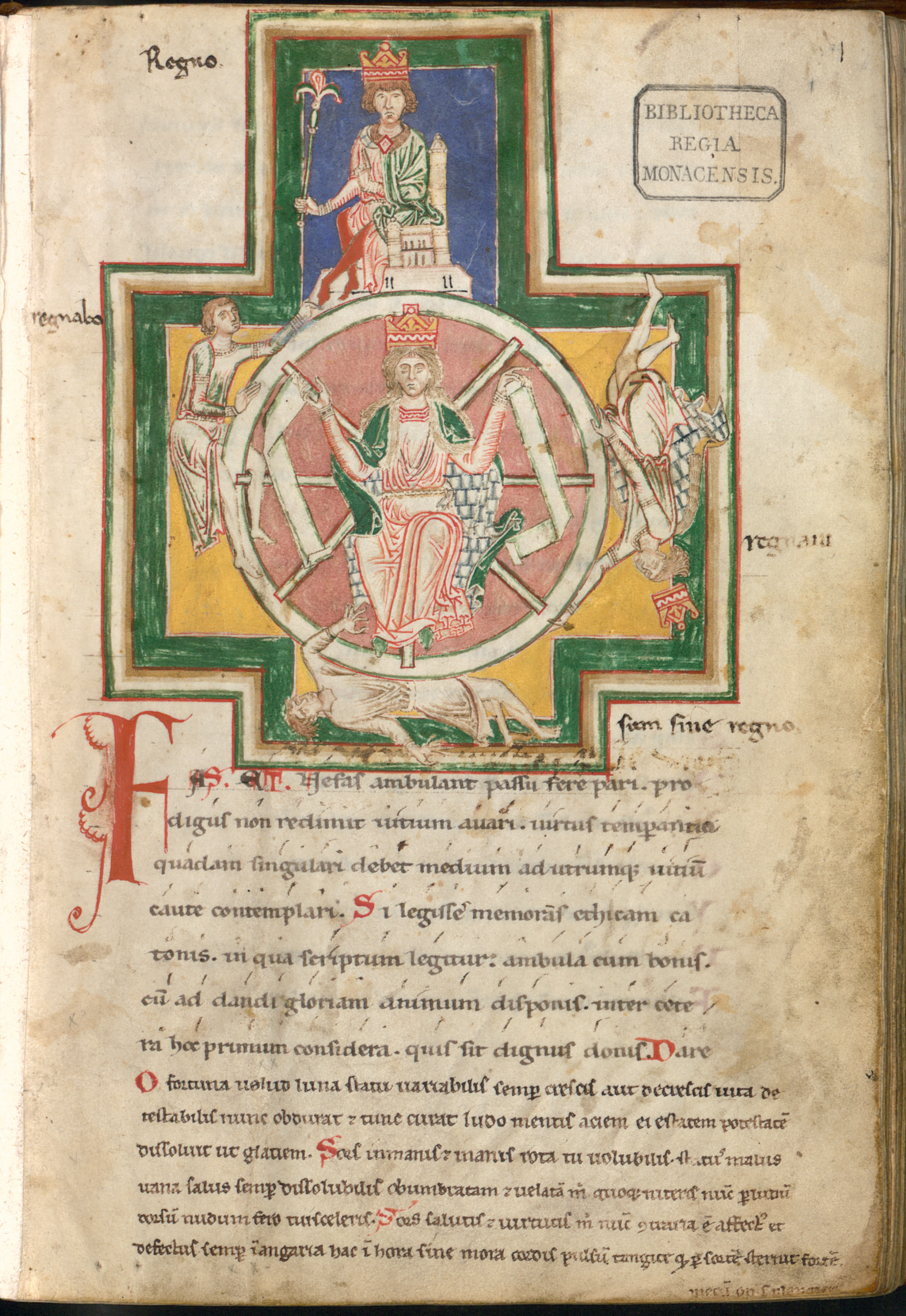
Rota fortunae (Wheel of Fortune) from the Codex Buranus

In 1934, Orff encountered the 1847 edition of the Carmina Burana by Johann Andreas Schmeller, the original text dating mostly from the 11th or 12th century, including some from the 13th century. Michel Hofmann was a young law student and an enthusiast of Latin and Greek; he assisted Orff in the selection and organization of 24 of these poems into a libretto mostly in secular Latin verse, with a small amount of Middle High German and Old French. The selection covers a wide range of topics, as familiar in the 21st century as they were in the 13th century: the fickleness of fortune and wealth, the ephemeral nature of life, the joy of the return of spring and the pleasures and perils of drinking, gluttony, gambling, and lust.

== Structure ==
Carmina Burana is structured into five major sections, containing 25 movements in total, including one repeated movement (O Fortuna) and one purely instrumental one (Tanz). Orff indicates attacca markings between all the movements within each scene.

	Fortuna Imperatrix Mundi		Fortune, Empress of the World	
1	O Fortuna	Latin	O Fortune	choir
2	Fortune plango vulnera	Latin	I lament the wounds that Fortune deals	choir
I	Primo vere		In Spring	
3	Veris leta facies	Latin	The joyous face of Spring	small choir
4	Omnia Sol temperat	Latin	All things are tempered by the Sun	baritone
5	Ecce gratum	Latin	Behold the welcome	choir
	Uf dem anger		In the Meadow	
6	Tanz		Dance	instrumental
7	Floret silva nobilis	Latin / Middle High German	The noble woods are burgeoning	choir
8	Chramer, gip die varwe mir	Middle High German	Monger, give me coloured paint	2 choirs (small and large)
9	(a) Reie		Round dance	instrumental
	(b) Swaz hie gat umbe	Middle High German	They who here go dancing around	choir
	(c) Chume, chum, geselle min	Middle High German	Come, come, my dear companion	small choir
	(d) Swaz hie gat umbe (reprise)	Middle High German	They who here go dancing around	choir
10	Were diu werlt alle min	Middle High German	If the whole world were but mine	choir
II	In Taberna		In the Tavern	
11	Estuans interius	Latin	Seething inside	baritone
12	Olim lacus colueram	Latin	Once I dwelt on a lake	tenor, choir (male)
13	Ego sum abbas	Latin	I am the abbot (of Cockaigne)	baritone, choir (male)
14	In taberna quando sumus	Latin	When we are in the tavern	choir (male)
III	Cour d'amours		Court of Love	
15	Amor volat undique	Latin	Love flies everywhere	soprano, boys' choir
16	Dies, nox et omnia	Latin / Old French	Day, night and everything	baritone
17	Stetit puella	Latin	There stood a girl	soprano
18	Circa mea pectora	Latin / Middle High German	In my chest	baritone, choir
19	Si puer cum puellula	Latin	If a boy with a girl	3 tenors, 1 baritone, 2 basses
20	Veni, veni, venias	Latin	Come, come, pray come	double choir
21	In trutina	Latin	On the scales	soprano
22	Tempus est iocundum	Latin	Time to jest	soprano, baritone, choir, boys' choir
23	Dulcissime	Latin	Sweetest boy	soprano
	Blanziflor et Helena		Blancheflour and Helen	
24	Ave formosissima	Latin	Hail to the most lovely	choir
	Fortuna Imperatrix Mundi		Fortune, Empress of the World	
25	O Fortuna (reprise)	Latin	O Fortune	choir

Much of the compositional structure is based on the idea of the turning Fortuna Wheel. The drawing of the wheel found on the first page of the Burana Codex includes four phrases around the outside of the wheel:

Regnabo, Regno, Regnavi, Sum sine regno.
(I shall reign, I reign, I have reigned, I am without a realm).

Within each scene, and sometimes within a single movement, the wheel of fortune turns, joy turning to bitterness, and hope turning to grief. "O Fortuna", the first poem in the Schmeller edition, completes this circle, forming a compositional frame for the work through being both the opening and closing movements.

== Staging ==
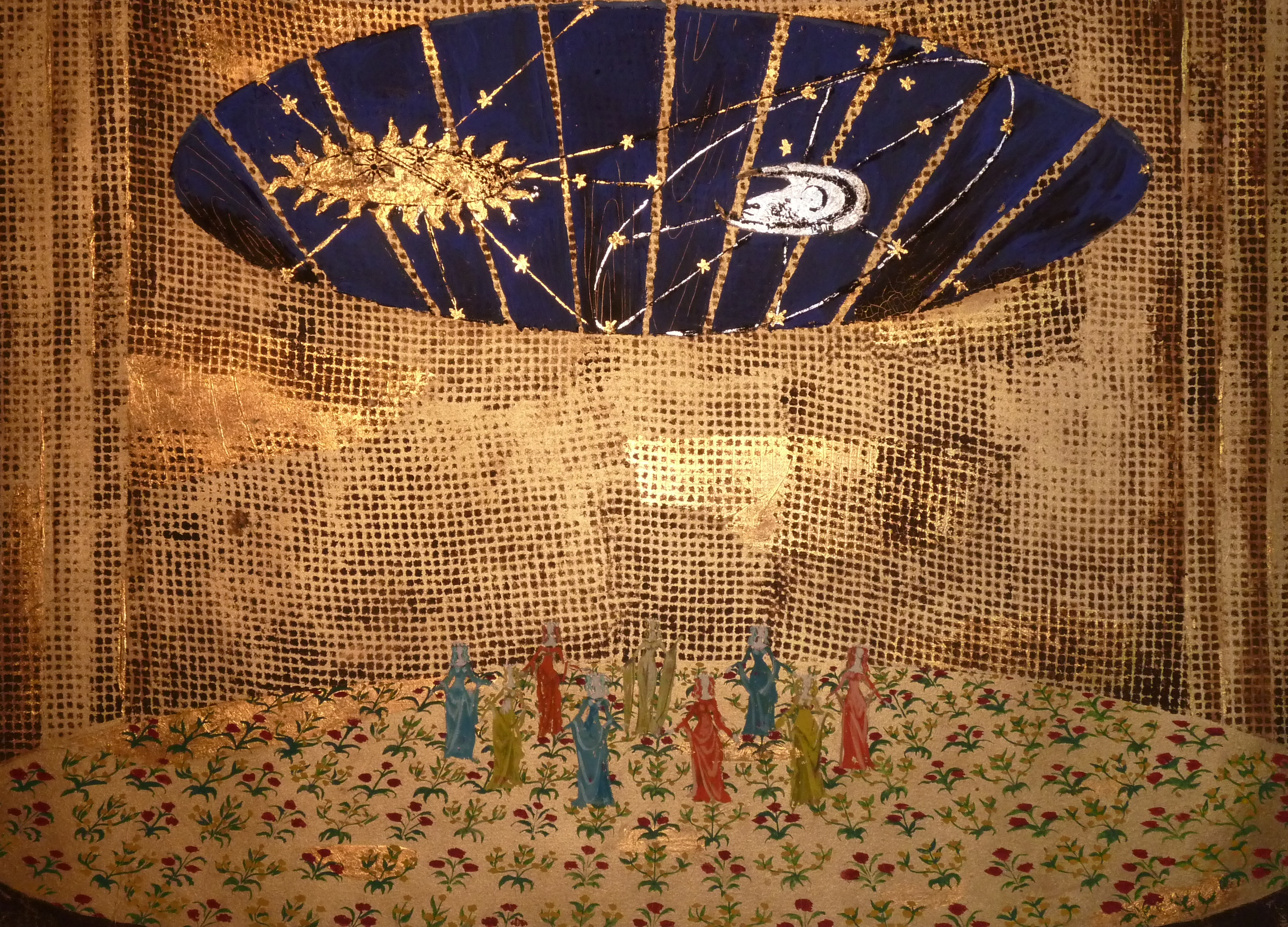
Set design by Helmut Jürgens for a performance in Munich in 1959

Orff subscribed to a dramatic concept called "Theatrum Mundi" in which music, movement, and speech were inseparable. Babcock writes that "Orff's artistic formula limited the music in that every musical moment was to be connected with an action on stage. It is here that modern performances of Carmina Burana fall short of Orff's intentions." Orff subtitled Carmina Burana a "scenic cantata" in his intention to stage the work with dance, choreography, visual design and other stage action; the piece is now usually performed in concert halls as a cantata.

John Butler was the first of several choreographers to tackle the score. His Carmina Burana was premiered by the New York City Opera on 24 September 1959, featuring Carmen de Lavallade, Veronika Mlakar, Scott Douglass, and Glen Tetley. It has since been performed by numerous companies including Alvin Ailey American Dance Theater, Ballet West, and Richmond Ballet and is now considered a canonical modern-ballet work.

A danced version of Carmina Burana was choreographed by Loyce Houlton for the Minnesota Dance Theatre in 1978. In honour of Orff's 80th birthday, an acted and choreographed film version was filmed, directed by Jean-Pierre Ponnelle for the German broadcaster ZDF; Orff collaborated in its production.

Kent Stowell choreographed the work for Pacific Northwest Ballet in Seattle. It premiered on 5 October 1993, with scenic design by Ming Cho Lee.

Carmina Burana was used in the collaboration program between Mao Daichi, Japanese actress and former top star of the famed all-female troupe Takarazuka Revue, and Yuzuru Hanyu, Japanese figure skater and two-time Olympic champion. The program was part of the annual ensemble ice show Yuzuru Hanyu Notte Stellata, an event that commemorates the 2011 Tōhoku earthquake and tsunami.The first half of the choreography, where Hanyu skates alone, was choreographed by the Canadian ice dancer and choreographer Shae-Lynn Bourne, and the second part, where Hanyu battles against the ‘goddess of fate’ played by Daichi, was choreographed by the Japanese musical theatre choreographer Rino Masaki. Through the performance, Hanyu wanted to convey “a strong message that even though we may feel the pain of disasters that are beyond our control, we must accept them and move on.”

== Musical style ==
"O Fortuna" (30 seconds)

Orff's style demonstrates a desire for directness of speech and of access. Carmina Burana contains little or no development in the classical sense, and polyphony is also conspicuously absent. Carmina Burana avoids overt harmonic complexities, a fact which many musicians and critics have pointed out, such as Ann Powers of The New York Times.

Orff was influenced melodically by late Renaissance and early Baroque models including William Byrd and Claudio Monteverdi. It is a common misconception that Orff based the melodies of Carmina Burana on neumeatic melodies; while many of the lyrics in the Burana Codex are enhanced with neumes, almost none of these melodies had been deciphered at the time of Orff's composition, and none of them had served Orff as a melodic model. His shimmering orchestration shows a deference to Stravinsky. In particular, Orff's music is very reminiscent of Stravinsky's earlier work Les noces (The Wedding).

Rhythm, for Orff as it was for Stravinsky, is often the primary musical element. Overall, Carmina Burana sounds rhythmically straightforward and simple, but the metre changes freely from one measure to the next. While the rhythmic arc in a section is taken as a whole, a measure of five may be followed by one of seven, to one of four, and so on, often with caesura marked between them.

Some of the solo arias pose bold challenges for singers: the only solo tenor aria, Olim lacus colueram, is often sung almost completely in falsetto to demonstrate the suffering of the character (in this case, a roasting swan). The baritone arias often demand high notes not commonly found in baritone repertoire, and parts of the baritone aria Dies nox et omnia are often sung in falsetto, a rare example in baritone repertoire. Also noted is the solo soprano aria Dulcissime, which demands extremely high notes. Orff intended this aria for a lyric soprano, not a coloratura, so that the musical tensions would be more obvious.

== Instrumentation ==
Carmina Burana is scored for a large orchestra consisting of:

Woodwinds

3 flutes (second and third doubling first and second piccolos)
3 oboes (third doubling English horn)
3 clarinets in B♭ and A (second doubling bass clarinet, third doubling sopranino clarinet in E♭)
2 bassoons
1 contrabassoon

Brass

4 horns in F
3 trumpets in B♭ and C
2 trombones
1 bass trombone
1 tuba

Percussion

5 timpani

2 snare drums
bass drum
triangle
cymbals
suspended cymbal
antique cymbals
ratchet
castanets
tambourine
sleigh bells
tam-tam
tubular bells
bell
3 glockenspiels
xylophone

Keyboards

2 pianos
1 celesta

Voice

2 SATB mixed choirs (one large and one small, although a subset of the large chorus may be used for the small chorus)
1 boys' choir

soprano soloist
tenor soloist
baritone soloist

Strings

violins I
violins II
violas
cellos
double basses

== Reception ==
Carmina Burana was first staged by the Oper Frankfurt on 8 June 1937 under conductor Bertil Wetzelsberger (1892–1967) with the Cäcilienchor Frankfurt, staging by Oskar Wälterlin and sets and costumes by Ludwig Sievert. Shortly after the greatly successful premiere, Orff said to his publisher, Schott Music: "Everything I have written to date, and which you have, unfortunately, printed, can be destroyed. With Carmina Burana, my collected works begin."

The first American performance was on 10 January 1954, by the University of San Francisco's Schola Cantorum led by Giovanni Camajani, at the San Francisco Memorial Opera House.

Several performances were repeated elsewhere in Germany. The Nazi regime was at first nervous about the erotic tone of some of the poems but eventually embraced the piece. It became the most famous piece of music composed in Germany at the time. The popularity of the work continued to rise after the war, and by the 1960s Carmina Burana was well established as part of the international classic repertoire. The piece was voted number 62 at the Classic 100 Ten Years On, in the top ten of the Classic 100 Voice, and is at number 144 of the 2020 Classic FM Hall of Fame.

Alex Ross wrote that "the music itself commits no sins simply by being and remaining popular. That Carmina Burana has appeared in hundreds of films and television commercials is proof that it contains no diabolical message, indeed that it contains no message whatsoever."

=== Subsequent arrangements ===
The popularity of the work has ensured the creation of many additional arrangements for a variety of performing forces.

In 1956, Orff's disciple Wilhelm Killmayer created a reduced version for soloists, SATB mixed choir, children's choir, two pianos and six percussion (timpani + 5), and was authorized by Orff. The score has short solos for three tenors, baritone and two basses. This version is to allow smaller ensembles the opportunity to perform the piece.

John Krance's concert band transcription was published in 1968.

An arrangement for wind ensemble was prepared by Juan Vicente Mas Quiles (born 1921), who wanted both to give wind bands a chance to perform the work and to facilitate performances in cities that have a high-quality choral union and wind band, but lack a symphony orchestra. A performance of this arrangement was recorded by the North Texas Wind Symphony under Eugene Corporon. In writing this transcription, Mas Quiles maintained the original chorus, percussion, and piano parts.

Carmina Burana became popular in Greece through its use at the beginning and end of Andreas Papandreou's election speeches from the 1974 legislative election to those of the 1993 legislative election.

The Carolina Crown Drum and Bugle Corps included sections from Orff's Carmina Burana in their 2025 show, The Point of No Return.

== Notable recordings ==
- Eugen Jochum (conductor) with the Bavarian Radio Symphony Orchestra and the Bavarian Radio Chorus (Chor und Symphonieorchester des Bayerischen Rundfunks), Munich, Germany, with choir master Josef Kugler, with Elfriede Trötschel (soprano), Paul Kuën (tenor), Hans Braun (baritone), recorded October 1952, released in 1953 and then in 1957 as part of Trionfi (reissued in 2012 on Major Classics, 3CD, M2CD016, 5 060294 540168)
- Wolfgang Sawallisch with the Cologne Radio Choir and Symphony Orchestra (Kölner Rundfunk-Sinfonie-Orchester), Agnes Giebel (soprano), Paul Kuen (tenor), and Marcel Cordes (baritone). Recorded in stereo in 1956 at West German radio in Cologne, released on LP in 1957 by Capitol in mono, reissued by EMI in stereo (duration 59:10) — Supervised by Orff (who can be heard applauding at the end of the last track), this was the first recording he called "authorized version".
- Leopold Stokowski with the Houston Symphony, Guy Gardner, Virginia Babikian, Clyde Hager, the Houston Chorale and the Houston Youth Symphony Boys Choir. Released 1959 Capitol Records
- Herbert Kegel with the MDR Rundfunkchor, the MDR Leipzig Radio Symphony Orchestra and Jutta Vulpius, Hans-Joachim Rotzsch, Kurt Hübenthal and Kurt Rehm. Recorded and released 1960 (VEB Deutsche Schallplatten).
- Eugene Ormandy, with the Philadelphia Orchestra and the Rutgers University Choir, Recorded and released, 1960, reissued, 1987 CBS Masterworks Records
- Rafael Frühbeck de Burgos with the New Philharmonia Orchestra, the New Philharmonia Chorus (chorus master: Wilhelm Pitz), Wandsworth School Boys' Choir, John Noble, Raymond Wolansky, Lucia Popp, EMI Classics, 1966.
- Kurt Prestel (1915–1988) with Chor & Orchester des Mozarteum Salzburg, Gerda Hartman (born 1943), Richard Brünner (1913–1994), Rudolf Knoll (1926–2007), Intercord, 1969
- Eugen Jochum with the choir and orchestra of the Deutsche Oper Berlin and Gundula Janowitz, Gerhard Stolze, and Dietrich Fischer-Dieskau. Recorded October 1967 in Berlin's Ufa-Studio, released 1968 (Deutsche Grammophon). This version was also endorsed by Orff himself and was the first choice of the BBC Radio 3 CD Review "Building a Library" review in 1995.
- Seiji Ozawa with the Boston Symphony Orchestra, Children's Chorus Of The New England Conservatory, New England Conservatory Chorus, Evelyn Mandac, Stanley Kolk, Sherrill Milnes, RCA, 1970.
- Ferdinand Leitner with the Kölner Rundfunk-Sinfonie Orchester, the Kölner Rundfunkchor led by Herbert Shernus, and the Tölzer Knabenchor, led by Gerhard Schmidt-Gaden, was "Carl Orff's authorized recording"; Ruth-Margret Pütz (soprano), Michael Cousins (tenor), Barry McDaniel (baritone), Roland Hermann (bass). Released 1973 by Acanta and as part of seven CD set "Carl Orff Collection" (Acanta, 1992) and on Arts Archives (2003).
- Kurt Eichhorn with the Munich Radio Orchestra and Chor des Bayerischen Rundfunks, Tölzer Knabenchor; Lucia Popp, John van Kesteren, Hermann Prey; film directed by Jean-Pierre Ponnelle for ZDF; recorded July 1973, released 1974 on Eurodisc; CD reissues on BMG in 1984 and 1995. Both the film adaptation and recording were endorsed by Orff himself (Orff also collaborated on the film in honour of his 80th birthday)
- Michael Tilson Thomas with the Cleveland Orchestra, Chorus and Boys Choir; Judith Blegen, Kenneth Riegel and Peter Binder; recorded 1974, released 1975 CBS Records (quadrophonic); CD re-release 1990 MK 33172 CBS Records Masterworks. This recording was used in Michael Smuin's 1997 ballet Carmina Burana, choreographed for Smuin Ballet.
- André Previn and the London Symphony Orchestra, with Sheila Armstrong, Gerald English, Thomas Allen, St Clement Danes Grammar School Boys' Choir, London Symphony Chorus. Recorded 25–27 November 1974, Kingsway Hall, first issued on LP October 1975. First recommendation in Penguin Record Guide 2nd edition.
- Riccardo Muti with Philharmonia Orchestra and Chorus and Arleen Auger, John van Kesteren and Jonathan Summers. Recorded 1979 (EMI), featured in the top three of BBC Radio 3's review and is also recommended by Classics Today.
- Robert Shaw with the Atlanta Symphony Orchestra, Atlanta Symphony Orchestra Chorus, and Atlanta Boy Choir; Judith Blegen, William Brown, and Håkan Hagegård; recorded 1981, released 1983 by Telarc.
- Ray Manzarek, keyboard player for the Doors, produced by Philip Glass and Kurt Munkacsi. Arrangements by Ray Manzarek. Carmina Burana, released 1983 on A&M Records.
- James Levine with Chicago Symphony Orchestra and Chorus and June Anderson, Philip Creech, and Bernd Weikl. Recorded 1984 (Deutsche Grammophon). This version won the 1987 Grammy Award for Best Choral Performance.
- New York Choral Society accompanied by Jeffrey Reid Baker using synthesizers. A 1988 recording.
- Herbert Blomstedt with the San Francisco Symphony, and the San Francisco Symphony Chorus, led by Vance George, won the Grammy Award for Best Choral Performance in 1992. The recording was released by Decca on October 11, 1991.
- Seiji Ozawa with the Berlin Philharmonic and Shin-Yu Kai Chorus; Kathleen Battle, Frank Lopardo and Thomas Allen; 1990 Philips DVD video.
- John Williams with the Boston Pops at the 1996 Summer Olympics in Atlanta.
- Charles Dutoit with the Montreal Symphony Orchestra and Saint Lawrence Choir soloists Beverly Hoch, Stanford Olsen, Mark Oswald. 1997, Decca 028945529028.
- Simon Rattle with the Berlin Philharmonic and Berlin Radio Choir; Sally Matthews, Lawrence Brownlee and Christian Gerhaher; 2005 EMI Classics.
- Leonard Slatkin with St. Louis Symphony Orchestra and Chorus, RCA 09026 61673–2, featured in the top three of BBC Radio 3's review
- Christian Thielemann with the choir and orchestra of the Deutsche Oper Berlin and Knabenchor Berlin. Released 1999 by Deutsche Grammophon; named "Editor's Choice" by Gramophone
- Jos Van Immerseel with Anima Eterna Brugge, Collegium Vocale Gent, and Cantate Domino; Yeree Suh, Yves Saelens and Thomas Bauer; 2014 Zigzag.
