= Carmina Burana (album) =

Studio album by Ray Manzarek
- Released: 1983
- Genre: Progressive rock; art rock; classical crossover
- Length: 39:57
- Label: A&M
- Producer: Philip Glass, Kurt Munkacsi

Ray Manzarek chronology
The Whole Thing Started with Rock & Roll Now It's Out of Control (1974)	Carmina Burana (1983)	Love Her Madly (2006)

Professional ratings
Review scores
Source	Rating
AllMusic	3.5/5 stars

Carmina Burana is the third solo album by Ray Manzarek released in 1983. It is a recording of Carl Orff's Carmina Burana.

== Cover art ==
Cover art features photo-montage of illustrations by Hieronymus Bosch (spelled on original release as Hieronymus Beach) and Jan van Eyck (Arnolfini Portrait) and modern items like guitar, drums, reel-to-reel and keyboards. Cover design by Lynn Robb. Photography by Larry Williams.

== Track listing ==
Music composed by Carl Orff. Original Latin lyrics adopted to English (C) B. Schott's Söhne by permission of European American Music

1. "Destiny: Ruler of the World – The Wheel of Fortune (O Fortuna)"
2. "Destiny: Ruler of the World – The Wounds of Fate (Fortune plango)"
3. "Springtime: The Face of Spring (Veris leta facies)"
4. "Springtime: Sunrise (Omnia sol temperat)"
5. "Springtime: Welcome (Ecce gratum)"
6. "Springtime: The Dance (Tanz)" – (Tanz Mix: Ich Schau D mix)
7. "Springtime: Sweetest Boy (Dulcissime)"
8. "Springtime: If the Whole World Was Mine (Were diu werlt)"
9. "In the Tavern: Boiling Rage (Estuans interius)"
10. "In the Tavern: The Roasted Swan (Olim lacus)"
11. "In the Tavern: In the Tavern (In taberna)"
12. "The Court of Love: Love Flies Everywhere (Amor volat)"
13. "The Court of Love: A Young Girl (Stetit puella)"
14. "The Court of Love: Come, My Beauty (Veni veni venias)"
15. "The Court of Love: The Lovers (Blanziflor et Helena)"
16. "Destiny: Ruler of the World – The Wheel of Fortune (O Fortuna)"

== Personnel ==
- Ray Manzarek – piano, organ, keyboards, arrangements
- Michael Riesman – synthesizers, orchestrations, conductor
- Larry Anderson – drums
- Ted Hall – guitar
- Doug Hodges – bass
- Adam Holzman – synthesizers
- Jack Kripl – saxophones, flutes

Principal Singers

- Catherine Aks
- Ma Premm Alimo
- Bruce Fifer
- Maryann Hart
- Cindy Hewes
- Michael Hume
- Elliot Levine
- Dora Ohrenstein
- Patrick Romano
- Kimball Wheeler

== Production notes ==
- Recording Engineer: John Beverly Jones
- Mixing Engineer: Joe Chiccarelli
- Recorded at A&M Recording Studios, Hollywood, CA; Cheerokee Recording Studios, Hollywood, CA; and Greene St. Recording Studios, New York, NY
- Mixed at Capitol Recording Studios, Hollywood, CA
- Digital Mastering at Masterdisk, New York, NY

== Liner notes ==
In 1983 Ray Manzarek, long attracted to the spiritual power of Carmina Burana, chose to interpret the piece in a contemporary framework. This presentation intends to create enchanted pictures; to conjure up the ecstasy expressed by the lyrics, an enhanced intense feeling for life akin to the passions and revelry of the wandering poets of so long ago.
