= The Pilgrim's Progress (opera) =

Opera by Ralph Vaughan Williams

- Opera by Ralph Vaughan Williams
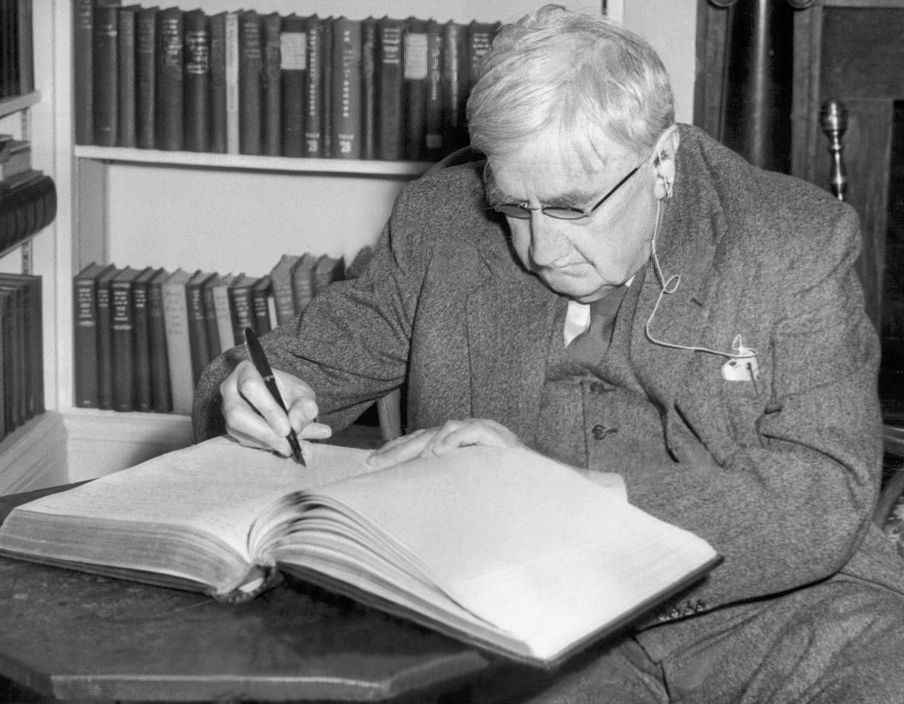
- Vaughan Williams signing the guest book at Yale University in 1954
- Description: Morality
- Librettist: Vaughan Williams
- Language: English
- Premiere: 26 April 1951; Royal Opera House, London

The Pilgrim's Progress is an opera by Ralph Vaughan Williams, based on John Bunyan's 1678 allegory The Pilgrim's Progress. The composer himself described the work as a 'Morality' rather than an opera. Nonetheless, he intended the work to be performed on stage, rather than in a church or cathedral. Vaughan Williams himself prepared the libretto, with interpolations from the Bible and also text from his second wife, Ursula Wood. His changes to the story included altering the name of the central character from 'Christian' to 'Pilgrim', so as to universalise the spiritual message.

The musical gestation of this opera was protracted, and was reflected in a number of musical projects in Vaughan Williams' life. For example, his earlier one-act opera The Shepherds of the Delectable Mountains from 1921 was incorporated into Act 4, Scene 2 of the later opera. His Symphony No. 5 also made use of themes originally conceived for his John Bunyan project. In 1940 he wrote a motet on Mr. Valiant-for-Truth's speech for mixed chorus. The BBC commissioned Vaughan Williams for incidental music for a 1942 radio dramatisation of The Pilgrim's Progress. Herbert Murrill has characterised the opera as "summarizing in three hours virtually the whole creative output of a great composer". The opera contains forty-one individual singing roles.

The first performance was at the Royal Opera House, Covent Garden on 26 April 1951. The conductor was Leonard Hancock, whom Vaughan Williams had personally chosen to conduct the premiere, and the director Nevill Coghill.

== Roles and first singers ==
- Arnold Matters (Pilgrim)
- Inia Te Wiata (John Bunyan)
- Edgar Evans (The Interpreter; A Celestial Messenger)
- Bryan Drake (Watchful, the porter)
- Norman Walker (Evangelist)
- Michael Langdon (Apollyon)
- Iris Kells (A Woodcutter's Boy)
- Parry Jones (Mister By-Ends)
- Jean Watson (Madam By-Ends)
- Monica Sinclair (A Heavenly Being)

== Performance history ==
The Covent Garden performances were not a success, and the company dropped the opera from its repertoire in 1952. However, a student production at the University of Cambridge in 1954 met with greater approval from the composer, notably for the performance of John Noble as Pilgrim. John Noble later recorded the role in the recording conducted by Sir Adrian Boult in 1970–71 (see Recordings below).

The North American premiere was on 28 April 1969, at Brigham Young University, a collaborative effort of the College of Fine Arts and Communications, Music Department, Opera Workshop and Symphony Orchestra. It was so well received that an encore production was mounted in 1970. In 1972, the year of the centenary of the composer's birth, the work was staged at Charterhouse School, where the composer was educated, conducted by William Llewellyn and produced by Geoffrey Ford, again with John Noble as Pilgrim. It was staged again in 1992 at the Royal Northern College of Music, with Joseph Ward directing, Igor Kennaway conducting, and Richard Whitehouse singing the role of Pilgrim. Brian Bell directed the opera's Australian premiere in July 1980 performed by the Canberra Opera Society. Three semi-staged productions were performed between 1997 and 2008, conducted by Richard Hickox, who also conducted a concert performance for Opera Australia in 2008.

A major staged production was produced by English National Opera at the London Coliseum in November 2012, conducted by Martyn Brabbins and directed by Yoshi Oida, with Roland Wood as Pilgrim.

A new production was performed in the Spring of 2019 at the Royal Northern College of Music in Manchester, conducted by David Parry and directed by Jonathan Cocker.

== Synopsis ==
=== Prologue ===
Bunyan in Prison

The opera opens to the chords of the psalm tune 'York'. John Bunyan is in Bedford Gaol, completing his book The Pilgrim's Progress. He stands, faces the audience, and begins to read from the opening of the book. As he does so, a vision of Pilgrim appears, carrying his burden. A curtain falls to conceal Bunyan, and Pilgrim is alone on stage, reading and in a state of lamentation.

=== Act 1 ===
Scene 1: The Pilgrim meets Evangelist

Evangelist directs Pilgrim towards the Wicket Gate. Four neighbours, Pliable, Obstinate, Mistrust and Timorous, appear to warn Pilgrim away from his journey. But Pilgrim dismisses them and continues.

Scene 2: The House Beautiful

Outside of the House Beautiful, Pilgrim "stumbles up to the Cross" and kneels before it. From off-stage, the voices of Three Shining Ones are heard. They then greet Pilgrim and relieve him of his burden. After Pilgrim knocks on the door of the House Beautiful, the Interpreter bids him welcome, as a chorus greets him. The Interpreter marks Pilgrim's forehead in blessing, and after receiving a white robe, Pilgrim enters the House.

Nocturne (Intermezzo)

Watchful, the house porter, prays for the safety of the house's denizens and for them to enjoy the blessings of sleep.

=== Act 2 ===
Scene 1: The Arming of the Pilgrim

The Herald asks who will go forth on the King's highway. Pilgrim volunteers, and a scribe notes his name in a book. Pilgrim then receives "armour of proof", and begins his journey.

Scene 2: The Pilgrim meets Apollyon

In the Valley of Humiliation, a chorus of Doleful Creatures, howling, surrounds Pilgrim as he enters. Apollyon enters and challenges Pilgrim in single combat, but Pilgrim prevails. The fight has exhausted Pilgrim, but two Heavenly Beings, Branch Bearer and Cup Bearer, restore Pilgrim with leaves from the Tree of Life and water from the Water of Life. Evangelist then returns and gives Pilgrim the Staff of Salvation, the Roll of the Word and the Key of Promise. He also warns Pilgrim to take care at town of Vanity.

=== Act 3 ===
Scene 1: Vanity Fair

At the fair in the town of Vanity, "all the pleasures of man" are for sale. Pilgrim enters, and averts his eyes from Vanity Fair as the crowd surrounds him and offers their wares, from Lord Lechery to Madam Bubble and Madam Wanton. The crowd asks what Pilgrim will buy, and he replies: "I buy the truth!" The crowd mocks Pilgrim, who denounces them as followers of Beelzebub. Lord Hate-good then appears, before whom the crowd brings Pilgrim to trial. Witnesses, including Superstition, Envy, Pickthank and Malice, as well as Madam Bubble and Madam Wanton denounce Pilgrim. Lord Hate-good asks for the crowd's verdict, and they demand death. Lord Hate-good orders Pilgrim to be imprisoned.

Scene 2: The Pilgrim in Prison

Pilgrim laments that God has forsaken him. In his despair, he clutches at his chest and feels the Key of Promise; after he has put it in the lock, he is instantly freed from prison and his bonds are gone. He resumes his journey.

=== Act 4 ===
Scene 1: The Pilgrim meets Mister By-Ends

The Woodcutter's Boy is chopping firewood at the edge of a forest when Pilgrim enters, asking how far there is to go to the Celestial City. The Boy replies "not far", and points out that one can see the Delectable Mountains on a clear day. The Boy then notices Mister and Madam By-Ends as they approach. Mister By-Ends announces that he has become a "gentleman of quality". He offers to keep the Pilgrim company on his journey, but Pilgrim replies that those who would travel with him must be willing to stand "against the wind and tide". Mister and Madam By-Ends refuse, preferring creature comforts and their "old principles" to poverty. They leave, and Pilgrim resumes his journey.

Entr'acte

Scene 2: The Shepherds of the Delectable Mountains

At the Delectable Mountains, three Shepherds are at evening prayer. Pilgrim approaches them and asks if he is on the path to the Celestial City. They reply yes, and after asking why he wishes to journey there, invite Pilgrim to rest with them momentarily. The voice of a bird sings praises to God. A Celestial Messenger appears and tells Pilgrim that "the Master" summons him that day. The Messenger ceremonially pierces Pilgrim's heart with an arrow "with the point sharpened with love". The Shepherds anoint Pilgrim. The Messenger directs Pilgrim on the path to the Celestial City, to which he must first cross the River of Death. The Shepherds pray for Pilgrim.

Scene 3: The Pilgrim reaches the End of his Journey

In darkness, a trumpet sounds in the distance. The scene brightens, and voices from Heaven welcome Pilgrim to the Celestial City, at the completion of his journey.

Epilogue

Back in Bedford Gaol, again to the strains of the 'York' psalm tune, Bunyan addresses the audience, holding out his book as an offering.

== Recordings ==
- 1971 HMV SLS 959 (later EMI Classics CMS 7 64212 2 CD release): John Noble (Pilgrim); Raimund Herincx (John Bunyan, Lord Hate-Good), John Carol Case (Evangelist), Wynford Evans, Christopher Keyte, Geoffrey Shaw, Bernard Dickerson, Sheila Armstrong, Marie Hayward, Gloria Jennings, Ian Partridge, John Shirley-Quirk, Terence Sharpe, Robert Lloyd, Norma Burrowes, Alfreda Hodgson, Joseph Ward, Richard Angas, John Elwes, Delia Wallis, Wendy Eathorne, Gerald English, Doreen Price, Jean Temperley, Kenneth Woollam; London Philharmonic Choir; London Philharmonic Orchestra; Sir Adrian Boult, conductor
- 1992 Royal Northern College of Music (RNCM PP1–2 DDD): Marsden/Griffiths/Whitehouse/Neale/Waddington, recorded 5, 8, and 25 March, conductor Kennaway
- 1997 Chandos studio recording (following 1996 stage production): Gerald Finley (Pilgrim); Peter Coleman-Wright (John Bunyan), Jeremy White (Evangelist), Richard Coxon, Roderick Williams. Gidon Saks, Francis Egerton, Rebecca Evans, Susan Gritton, Pamela Helen Stephen, Anne-Marie Owens, Mark Padmore, Robert Hayward, Adrian Thompson; Royal Opera Chorus; Orchestra of the Royal Opera House, Covent Garden; Richard Hickox, conductor
- 2023 RVW Society recording and filming at the Three Choirs Festival, semi-staged: Charlotte Corderoy, cond.; Lydia Shariff, Madam By-Ends; Emyr Lloyd Jones, Bunyan; Ross Cumming, Pilgrim
