= John van Kesteren =

Dutch opera singer (1921–2008)

John van Kesteren (4 May 1921 in The Hague – 11 July 2008 in Jupiter, Florida) was a Dutch operatic tenor.

== Career ==
Van Kesteren first worked as an electronic telex specialist for the Dutch Telegraph Company PTT. His very first appearance as a non-professional singer was in 1942 with an operetta company in Apeldoorn in the French operetta The Bells of Corneville. During World War II he appeared in five French and German operettas. From 1946 on he studied at the Royal Conservatory of The Hague with the bass Willem Ravelli. He went on to study with Prof. Dr. Lothar Wallerstein of the Vienna State Opera.

He made his operatic debut in 1947 in Scheveningen, the Netherlands with the ensemble of Vienna State Opera as the Italian singer in Der Rosenkavalier, a production with Anni Konetzni, Fritz Krenn and Hilde Güden. In 1949, he got another unique chance when world-famous conductor Erich Kleiber asked him to audition for the roles of the young sailor and Melot in Wagner's Tristan und Isolde, in a production by the Wagner Society in Amsterdam, once again, directed by Lothar Wallerstein. His partners were Kirsten Flagstad, Max Lorenz and Hans Hotter. In 1947, his concert career started in Switzerland in Beethoven's Missa Solemnis under the direction of Charles Münch.

After completing his studies with Nadia Boulanger in Paris and Vera Schwarz in Salzburg, Van Kesteren was invited in 1954 to Berlin's Komische Oper to sing Nurreddin in Cornelius's The Barber of Baghdad under the direction of Walter Felsenstein and to sing the title role in the first performance in Germany of Rossini's Le comte Ory under the direction of Carl Ebert at the Stadtische Oper in 1956. In 1959 he moved to Munich at the invitation of both the German National Theatre and the Theater am Gartnerplaz, where he remained for seventeen years singing 33 opera's and operettas.

As a lyric tenor with a remarkable range in the upper register, he specialized in roles that are generally difficult to cast, in both the 18th and 19th-century repertoire, including Jean Ph. Rameau's Platée, Rossini's Le Comte Ory and Chapelou in Adam's Le Postillon de Longjumeau, and 20th-century works, ranging from roles in Richard Strauss's operas and Carl Orffs Carmina Burana to Sinopoli's Lou Salome. Carl Orff, who later became a close friend, would write to people anywhere in the world planning to perform Carmina Burana saying that John van Kesteren was his favourite "Roasted Swan". He also performed this role in the award-winning movie of the cantata together with Hermann Prey, Lucia Popp and director Jean-Pierre Ponnelle and conductor Kurt Eichhorn.

In later years Van Kesteren specialized in character parts, as well as singing a wide concert repertoire that included hundreds of appearances as the Evangelist in Bach's St Matthew Passion. At Benjamin Britten's suggestion to conductor Herbert von Karajan he sang at first German performance of Britten's War Requiem with the Berlin Philharmonic. With van Karajan and the same orchestra, Van Kesteren sang at the 25th commemoration in Beethoven's ninth symphony and Missa Solemnis in Hiroshima and sang the Evangelist in the first Russian performance of the St Matthew Passion in Moscow.

In 1974, Van Kesteren was officially invited to start a revival of cultural ties between the Netherlands and Indonesia, presenting concerts, radio and television programmes. He sang concerts and opera in among other cities, London, Tokyo, Melbourne, Rome, Berlin, Paris, Oslo etc. The Bavarian government named him Kammersänger. He was an Officer in the order of the Royal Dutch House of Orange-Nassau. and the German government bestowed upon him the Bundesverdienstkreuz first class. Until his death in 2008, John van Kesteren lived in, Jupiter, Florida with his wife Louise. He continued to sing into his eighties. van Kesteren's last major performance was a solo recital for the inauguration of Palm Beach Atlantic University's Helen K. Persson Recital Hall in 2000.
