= O Fortuna =

Medieval Latin poem, part of the Carmina Burana

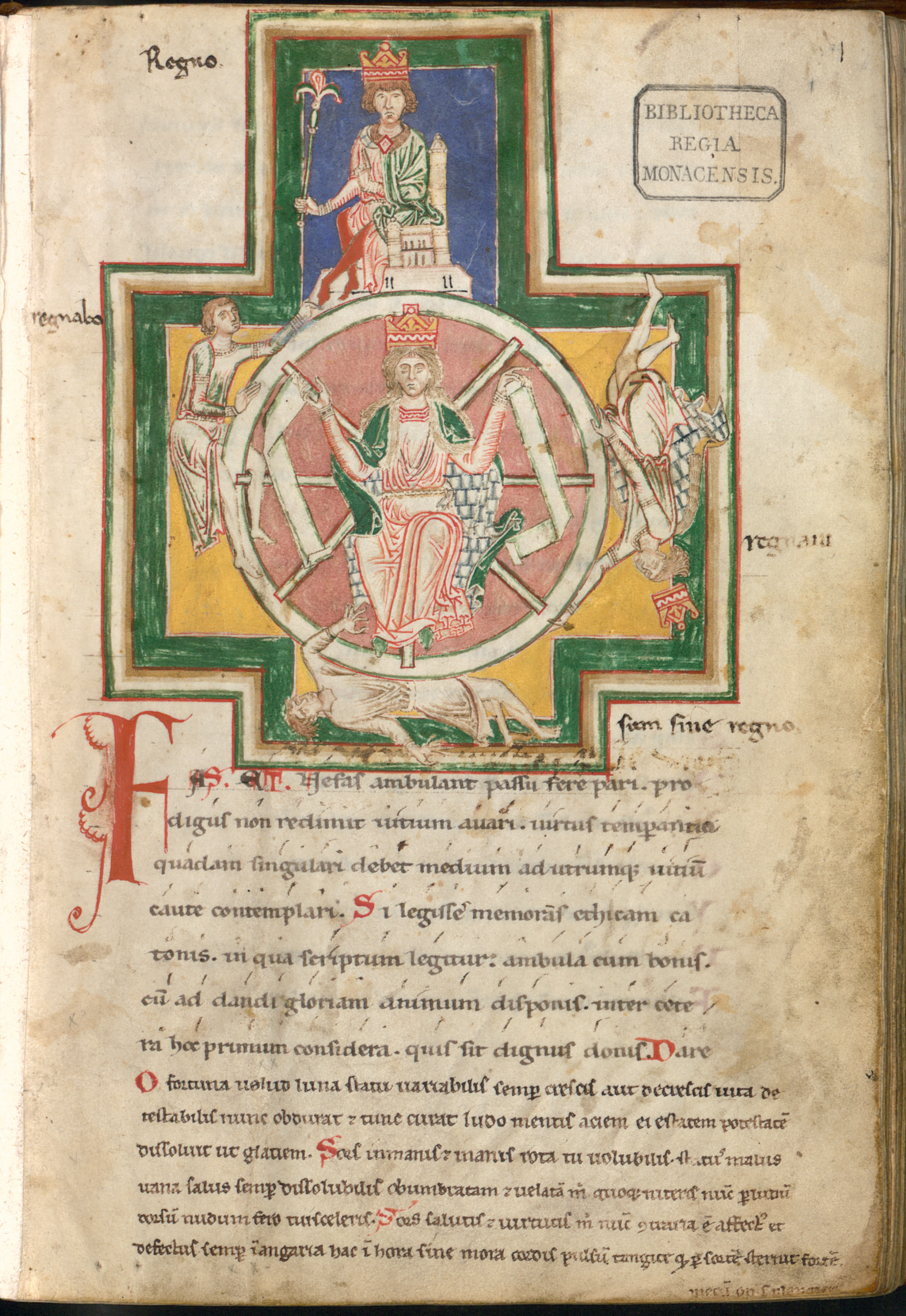
"O Fortuna" in the Carmina Burana manuscript (Bavarian State Library; the poem occupies the last six lines on the page, along with the overrun at bottom right.

"O Fortuna" is a medieval Latin Goliardic poem which is part of the collection known as the Carmina Burana, written in the early 13th century. It is a complaint about Fortuna, the inexorable fate that rules both gods and mortals in Roman mythology.

In 1935–36, "O Fortuna" was set to music by German composer Carl Orff as a part of "Fortuna Imperatrix Mundi", the opening and closing movement of his cantata Carmina Burana. It was first staged by the Frankfurt Opera on June 8, 1937. It opens at a slow pace with thumping drums and choir that drops quickly into a whisper, building slowly in a steady crescendo of drums and short string and horn notes peaking on one last long powerful note and ending abruptly. The tone is modal, until the last nine bars. A performance takes a little over two and a half minutes.

Orff's setting of the poem has influenced and been used in many other works and has been performed by numerous classical music ensembles and popular artists. It can be heard in numerous films and television commercials, and has become a staple in western popular culture, setting the mood for dramatic or cataclysmic situations. "O Fortuna" topped The People's Classical Chart in 2009 as the most-played classical music of the previous 75 years in the United Kingdom.

== History ==
=== Benediktbeuern manuscript ===
"O Fortuna" is a medieval Latin Goliardic poem written in the 13th century of uncertain authorship. It is a complaint against the goddess of fortune, contained in the collection known as the Carmina Burana.

=== Orff's setting ===
"O Fortuna" (30 seconds)
Orff's setting

Carl Orff encountered the collection in 1934 and worked with a Latin and Greek enthusiast, Michel Hofmann, to select and organize 24 of the poems into a libretto. Orff composed his Carmina Burana, using the libretto, in 1935–1936. It was first performed by the Frankfurt Opera on June 8, 1937. The cantata is composed of 25 movements in five sections, with "O Fortuna" providing a compositional frame, appearing as the first movement and reprised for the twenty-fifth, both in sections titled "Fortuna Imperatrix Mundi" (Fortune, Empress of the World).

== Text ==
Scott Horton wrote in Harper's that the text of the poem highlights how few people, at the time it was written, "felt any control over their own destiny" while at the same time it "rings with a passion for life, a demand to seize and treasure the sweet moments that pitiful human existence affords."

O Fortuna
velut luna
statu variabilis,
semper crescis
aut decrescis;
vita detestabilis
nunc obdurat
et tunc curat
ludo mentis aciem,
egestatem,
potestatem
dissolvit ut glaciem.

Sors immanis
et inanis,
rota tu volubilis,
status malus,
vana salus
semper dissolubilis,
obumbrata
et velata
michi quoque niteris;
nunc per ludum
dorsum nudum
fero tui sceleris.

Sors salutis
et virtutis
michi nunc contraria,
est affectus
et defectus
semper in angaria.
Hac in hora
sine mora
corde pulsum tangite;
quod per sortem
sternit fortem,
mecum omnes plangite!

Translation:

O Fortune,
like the moon
you are changeable,
ever waxing
ever waning;
hateful life
first oppresses
and then soothes
playing with mental clarity;
poverty
and power
it melts them like ice.

Fate – monstrous
and empty,
you whirling wheel,
you are malevolent,
devoid of security
and ever fading to nothing,
shadowed
and veiled
you plague me too;
now through the game
I bring my bare back
to your villainy.

Fate, in health
and virtue
is against me,
driven on
and weighted down,
always enslaved.
So at this hour
without delay
pluck the vibrating strings;
since Fate
strikes down the strong,
everyone weep with me!

== Music ==
Orff was inspired both by the poem and the medieval symbol of the Rota Fortunae, or Wheel of Fortune, which the goddess Fortuna spins at random, causing some people to suffer while others find wealth. The Rota Fortunae appears in a version of the poetry collection known as the Codex Buranas. The repetition of the musical accompaniment draws a comparison to the spinning of the wheel.

"O Fortuna" opens at a slow pace with thumping drums and energetic choir that drops quickly into a whisper, building slowly in a steady crescendo of drums and short string and horn notes peaking on one last long powerful note and ending abruptly. Conductor Marin Alsop wrote that it "begins with all forces at full throttle, then immediately scale[s] back in an ominous warning repetition that builds to a climactic close". The tone is modal, with melody built around a tonal center, until the last nine bars. The last syllable of the song shifts in both key and emotional valence, from D minor to D major.

Alsop describes the piece as "a spectacle" which appeals to all of the senses, intentionally defying neat categorization. According to David Clem, "the music signifies the upturn of Fortune's wheel, while the text represents the downturn."

== Reception ==
Carmina Burana was successful from its first staging by the Frankfurt Opera in 1937, propelling Orff's career and becoming his best known work. "O Fortuna" in particular has become one of the most recognizable compositions in popular culture. In 2009, it topped a BBC list of most widely heard classical tracks, with BBC Radio 2 head of programming calling it "a timeless piece of music that continues to be played, performed and loved over 70 years after its composition." A Radio Netherlands documentary attributes its popular appeal to the combination of choruses, large orchestra, interesting instrument combinations, tight rhythm, and the extent to which it is singable and memorable. Horton calls it "a work of brilliance" that "may have been spoiled by its popularization", used "often as a jingle, detached in any meaningful way from its powerful message".

In The Oxford Handbook of Music and Advertising, Clem highlights how the poem's themes like human struggle and fate are commonly divorced from popular usage. He takes as an example the use of the music in an Applebee's advertisement which changes the words to be about a new promotion, drawing on the arrangement simply for its signification of the vernacular concept of "epic" (an "epic deal"). Widespread use of "O Fortuna" in advertising and other forms of popular culture may have begun with the trailer for the 1981 movie Excalibur, which uses the song in its entirety.

"O Fortuna" has been called "the most overused piece of music in film history", and Harper's Magazine columnist Scott Horton has commented that "Orff's setting may have been spoiled by its popularization" and its use "in movies and commercials often as a jingle, detached in any meaningful way from its powerful message." Its contemporary usage is often joking or satirical in nature (e.g. its use in the 2009 episode "Gone Maggie Gone" of The Simpsons), owing to its oversaturation in popular culture.

The composition appears in numerous films and television commercials and has become a staple in popular culture, setting the mood for dramatic or cataclysmic situations. For instance, it is used to portray the torment of Jim Morrison's drug addiction in the film The Doors. In 1983, Doors' keyboardist Ray Manzarek released his third solo album, Carmina Burana, which is an interpretation of the piece in a contemporary framework.

In the 1970s, the "O Fortuna" music was used for an Old Spice commercial which aired in the United Kingdom. The trailer of John Boorman's Excalibur (1981) featured "O Fortuna" in its entirety. It has been covered, remixed, and sampled in a wide variety of popular musical acts like Therion and Nas.

In the 2000s, the "O Fortuna" music was used for The X Factor.

== Recordings ==
Recordings of "O Fortuna" as stand-alone piece
Recorded	Conductor	Orchestra	Choir	Time	Release
October 25, 1991	Robert Groslot	Il Novecento	Proms choir	2:28	Night of the Proms, Vol. 6
October 28, 2009		Trans-Siberian Orchestra	Trans-Siberian Orchestra choir	2:44	Night Castle, disc 2, track 12
May 4, 2020	Martina Batič		Chœur de Radio France	2:05	France Musique

== General and cited references ==
- Clem, David (2021). "Medievalism goes Commercial: The Epic as Register in Contemporary Media". In Deaville, James [at Wikidata]; Tan, Siu-Lan; Rodman, Ron (eds.). The Oxford Handbook of Music and Advertising. Oxford University Press. pp. 488–504. ISBN 9780190691240. OCLC 1195817243.
