= O Fortuna (Orff) =

Movement from Carl Orff's Carmina Burana (1937)

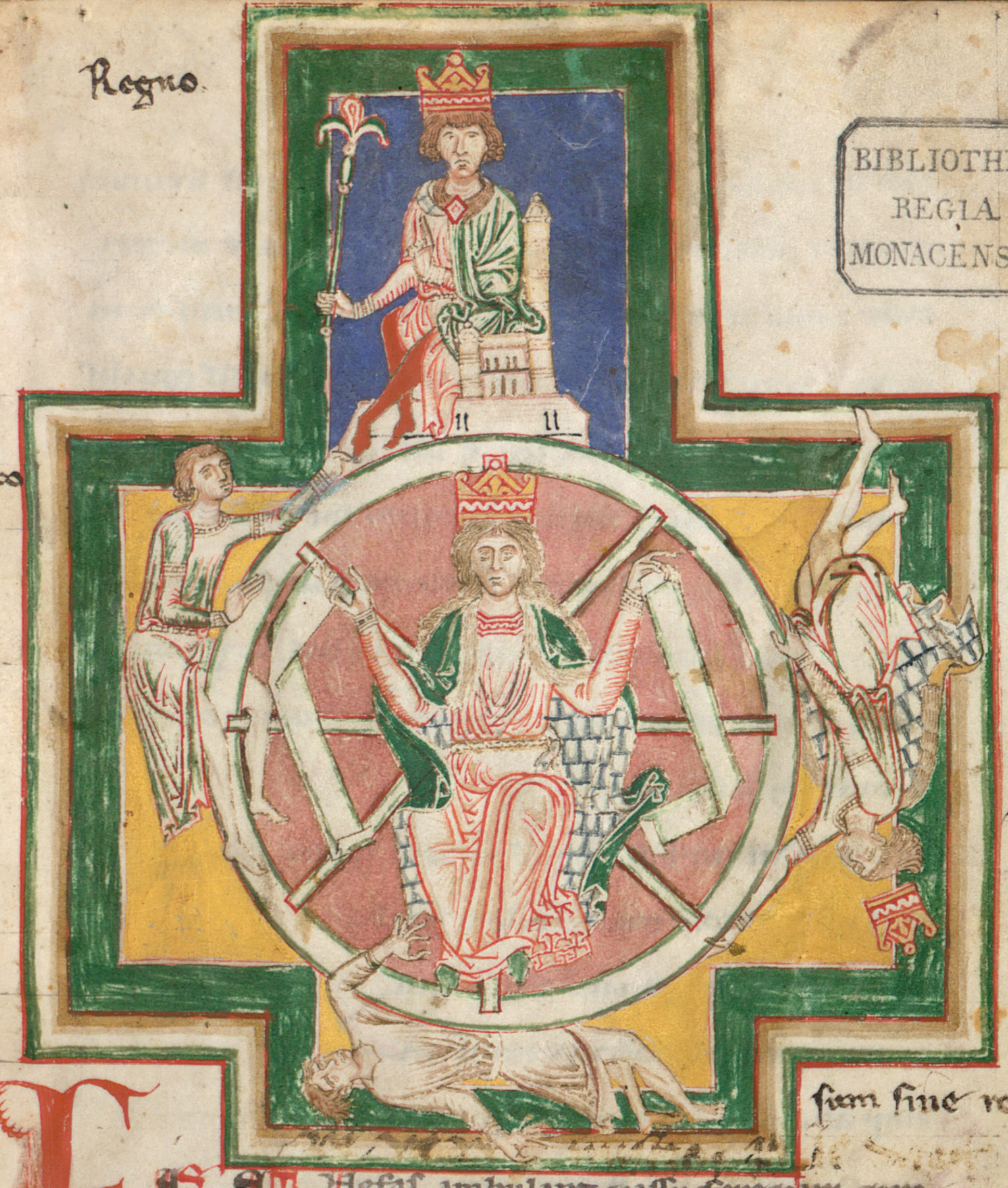
Rota Fortunae in the Carmina Burana

"O Fortuna" is a movement in Carl Orff's 1935–36 cantata Carmina Burana. It begins the opening and closing sections, both titled "Fortuna Imperatrix Mundi". The cantata is based on a medieval Goliardic poetry collection of the same name, from which the poem "O Fortuna" provides the words sung in the movement. It was well received during its time, and entered popular culture through use in other musical works, advertisements, and soundtracks beginning in the late 20th century.

== Composition ==
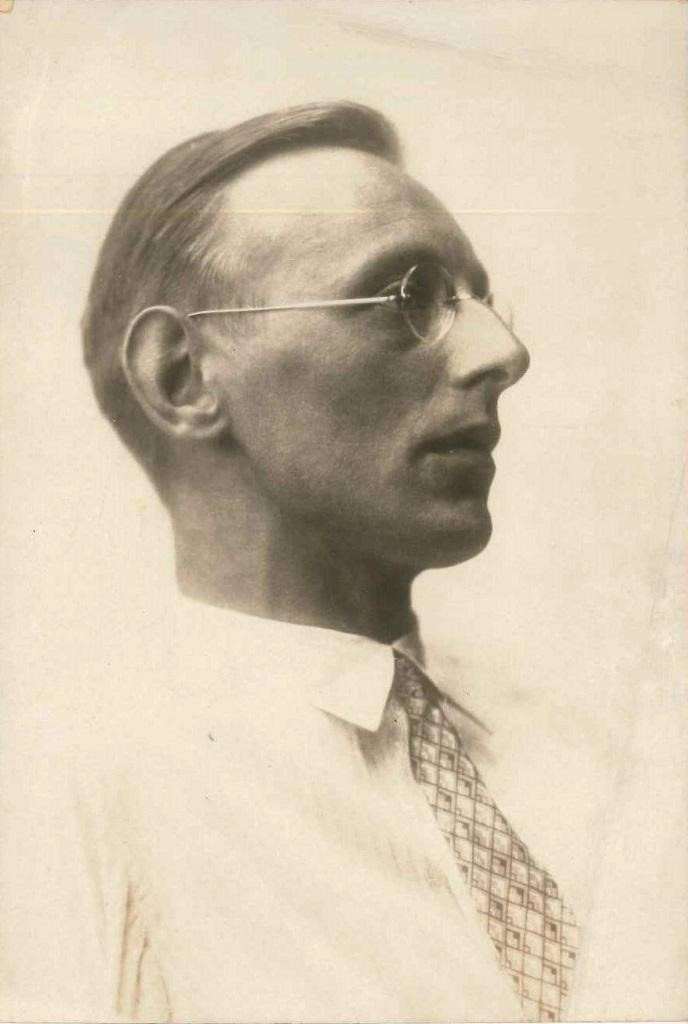
Carl Orff in 1940

"O Fortuna" (30 seconds)

"O Fortuna" is a medieval Latin Goliardic poem written in the 13th century of uncertain authorship. It is a complaint against the goddess of fortune, contained in the collection known as the Carmina Burana. Carl Orff encountered the collection in 1934 and worked with a Latin and Greek enthusiast, Michel Hofmann, to select and organize 24 of the poems into a libretto. Orff composed his Carmina Burana, using the libretto, in 1935–36. It was first performed by the Frankfurt Opera on 8 June 1937. The cantata is composed of 25 movements in five sections, with "O Fortuna" providing a compositional frame, appearing as the first movement and reprised for the twenty-fifth, both in sections titled "Fortuna Imperatrix Mundi".

Scott Horton wrote in Harper's that the text of the poem highlights how few people, at the time it was written, "felt any control over their own destiny" while at the same time it "rings with a passion for life, a demand to seize and treasure the sweet moments that pitiful human existence affords."

== Music ==
Orff was inspired both by the poem and the medieval symbol of the Rota Fortunae, or Wheel of Fortune, which the goddess Fortuna spins at random, causing some people to suffer while others find wealth. The Rota Fortunae appears in a version of the poetry collection known as the Codex Buranas. The repetition of the musical accompaniment draws a comparison to the spinning of the wheel.

"O Fortuna" opens at a slow pace, at 60 minims per minute (in 3/1, notated in Orff's notation as 3/), with thumping drums and energetic choir that drops quickly into a whisper, then doubling speed to 120 minims per minute (in 3/2) and building slowly in a steady crescendo of drums and short string and horn notes peaking on one last long powerful note and ending abruptly. Conductor Marin Alsop wrote that it "begins with all forces at full throttle, then immediately scale[s] back in an ominous warning repetition that builds to a climactic close". The tone is modal, with melody built around a tonal center, until the last nine bars. The last syllable of the song shifts in both key and emotional valence, from D minor to D major.

Alsop describes the piece as "a spectacle" which appeals to all of the senses, intentionally defying neat categorization. According to David Clem, "the music signifies the upturn of Fortune's wheel, while the text represents the downturn."

== Reception and legacy ==
Carmina Burana was successful from its first staging by the Frankfurt Opera in 1937, propelling Orff's career and becoming his best known work. "O Fortuna" in particular has become one of the most recognizable compositions in popular culture. In 2009, it topped a BBC list of most widely heard classical tracks, with BBC Radio 2 head of programming calling it "a timeless piece of music that continues to be played, performed and loved over 70 years after its composition." A Radio Netherlands documentary attributes its popular appeal to the combination of choruses, large orchestra, interesting instrument combinations, tight rhythm, and the extent to which it is singable and memorable. Horton calls it "a work of brilliance" that "may have been spoiled by its popularization", used "often as a jingle, detached in any meaningful way from its powerful message".

In The Oxford Handbook of Music and Advertising, David Clem highlights how the poem's themes like human struggle and fate are commonly divorced from popular usage. He takes as an example the use of the music in an Applebee's advertisement which changes the words to be about a new promotion, drawing on the arrangement simply for its signification of the vernacular concept of "epic" (an "epic deal"). Widespread use of "O Fortuna" in advertising and other forms of popular culture may have begun with the trailer for the 1981 movie Excalibur which uses the song in its entirety, and with the popular television advertisements in late 1970s to early 1980s, "mark of a man", for Old Spice aftershave.

It has been covered, remixed, and sampled by a wide variety of popular musical acts like Therion, Lab 4, and Nas. In late 1991, the song was used by two independent Belgian electronic dance music acts. In a 24 February 1992 case in Dutch court, Orff's heirs successfully argued that they never authorised the use of the work for electronic dance music. Both Belgian releases as well as the 18th edition of Turn up the Bass were pulled from store shelves in the Netherlands because of the verdict.
