= John Noble (baritone) =

English singer (1931–2008)

John Noble (2 January 1931 – 21 March 2008) was an English baritone. He was Ralph Vaughan Williams's favourite in the title role of the composer's opera The Pilgrim's Progress.

== Early life ==
Born in Southampton, the son of a gardener, Noble's love of music and performance began at Godalming Grammar School, Surrey. He gained a scholarship to Fitzwilliam College, Cambridge, where he graduated in geography. While there, he studied singing with the baritone Clive Carey, and George Guest arranged for him to join the choir of St. John's College for a postgraduate year.

== Career ==
In 1954, Noble took the title role in Dennis Arundell's production of Ralph Vaughan Williams's The Pilgrim's Progress at the Cambridge Guildhall. The composer's wife, Ursula Vaughan Williams, recalled that Noble brought "a touching and dedicated dignity as the Pilgrim", and after the production's opening Vaughan Williams said, "This is what I meant." In 1970, Noble was asked to sing the role in the EMI recording conducted by Sir Adrian Boult.

A year of teaching geography followed university, but then he joined the BBC Singers and went on to make a living from solo engagements, supplemented by recordings with the Ambrosian Singers. As a concert singer his repertoire included Bach (singing the voice of Jesus in the Passions), Handel, Elgar, Britten, Delius, Tippett and Vaughan Williams. His operatic work included the vicar in Britten's Albert Herring for the English Opera Group, conducted by the composer and subsequently recorded by Decca (1964). As part of the BBC's Bizet centenary broadcasts he took the title role in a radio production of Ivan IV in October 1975, conducted by Bryden Thomson. In 1985 he took part in a rare modern performance of The Golden Legend by Sullivan in London.

He appeared in 13 Proms at the Royal Albert Hall from 1962 until 1980; in 1972 his three concerts ranged from Gabrieli and Scarlatti to Sullivan and in 1975 he was in Moses und Aron under Boulez.

The conductor Meredith Davies invited him to join the staff of Trinity College of Music, London. He later taught at the Royal Northern College of Music, Manchester, and had a thriving teaching practice for the rest of his life.

He died aged 77 of pancreatic cancer.

== Discography ==
- Britten – Albert Herring; with English Opera Group/Benjamin Britten (1964, Decca)
- Delius – Sea Drift; with Liverpool Philharmonic Chorus; Royal Liverpool Philharmonic Orchestra/Charles Groves (1973, EMI)
- Carl Orff – Carmina Burana; with Raymond Wolansky (tenor), Lucia Popp (soprano); New Philharmonia Chorus (chorus master: Wilhelm Pitz), Wandsworth School Boys' Choir, New Philharmonia Orchestra, Rafael Frühbeck de Burgos (1966, EMI).
- Vaughan Williams – The Pilgrim's Progress; with London Philharmonic Choir; London Philharmonic Orchestra/Adrian Boult (1970–71, EMI)
