= Classic 100 Ten Years On =

During 2010 the Australian radio station ABC Classic FM held a Classic 100 Ten Years On countdown. The survey recreated the Classic 100 Original countdown held in 2001.

Voting for the countdown was held between 11 September 2010 and 1 October 2010, with each listener being permitted to vote for up to 10 works. The broadcasting of the results of the countdown began on 30 October 2010 and concluded on 7 November 2010.

== Countdown results ==
The results of countdown are as follows:

Rank	Composer	Work	Opus	Genre	Key	Date	Rank in the original 100	Change in rank
100	Mozart	Symphony No. 40	K. 550	Symphony	G minor	1788	—	
99	Schubert	Adagio for piano trio (Notturno)	D. 897	Trio	E♭ major	1821	17	-82
98	Strauss, R	Songs with Orchestra^{*}		Song		1899	—	
97	Mozart	Così fan tutte	K. 588	Opera		1789	85	-12
96	Górecki	Symphony No. 3 (Symphony of Sorrowful Songs)	Op. 36	Symphony		1976	—	
95	Giazotto (attrib. Albinoni)	Adagio for strings and organ	T. Mi 26	Adagio	G minor	1958	94	-1
94	Chopin	Piano Concerto No. 1	Op. 11	Concerto	E minor	1830	71	-23
93	Mozart	Clarinet Quintet	K. 581	Quintet	A major	1789	84	-9
92	Handel	Zadok the Priest	HWV 258	Anthem	D major	1727	95	+3
91	Sibelius	Symphony No. 5	Op. 82	Symphony	E♭ major	1919	—	
90	Brahms	Piano Concerto No. 2	Op. 83	Concerto	B♭ major	1881	—	
89	Purcell	Dido and Aeneas	Z. 626	Opera		1688	92	+3
88	Mascagni	Cavalleria rusticana		Opera		1890	30	-58
87	Tallis	Spem in alium		Motet		1570	—	
86	Smetana	My Country—Vltava	T. 111	Symphonic poem	E minor	1874	60	-26
85	Schubert	Symphony No. 9 (Great)	D. 944	Symphony	C major	1840	—	
84	Khachaturian	Spartacus		Orchestral suite		1954	99	+15
83	Rachmaninoff	Symphony No. 2	Op. 27	Symphony	E minor	1907	—	
82	Brahms	Violin Concerto in D	Op. 77	Concerto	D major	1878	—	
81	Puccini	Madama Butterfly		Opera		1904	38	-43
80	Berlioz	Symphonie fantastique	Op. 14	Symphony		1830	—	
79	Mendelssohn	Hebrides Overture	Op. 26	Overture	B minor	1830	—	
78	Dvořák	Cello Concerto in B minor	Op. 104	Concerto	B minor	1895	—	
77	Beethoven	Triple Concerto	Op. 56	Concerto	C major	1803	—	
76	Mozart	Don Giovanni	K. 527	Opera		1787	—	
75	Grieg	Peer Gynt	Op. 23	Suite		1875	98	+23
74	Bach, JS	Cello Suite No. 1	BWV 1007	Suite	G major	1723	20	-54
73	Tchaikovsky	The Nutcracker	Op. 71a	Suite		1891	—	
72	Rimsky-Korsakov	Scheherazade	Op. 35	Symphonic suite		1888	—	
71	Massenet	Méditation (from Thaïs)		Symphonic intermezzo		1894	39	-32
70	Mendelssohn	A Midsummer Night's Dream	Op. 21, 61	Overture & incidental music		1842	—	
69	Mussorgsky (orch. Ravel)	Pictures at an Exhibition		Suite		1874	—	
68	Tchaikovsky	Symphony No. 5	Op. 64	Symphony	E minor	1888	—	
67	Mahler	Symphony No. 1 (Titan)		Symphony	D major	1888	—	
66	Stravinsky	The Rite of Spring		Ballet		1913	97	+31
65	Schubert	String Quartet No. 14 (Death and the Maiden)	D. 810	Quartet	D minor	1824	—	
64	Grieg	Piano Concerto in A minor	Op. 16	Concerto	A minor	1868	68	+4
63	Barber	Adagio for Strings	Op. 11a	Orchestral	B♭ major	1936	36	-27
62	Orff	Carmina Burana		Cantata		1937	83	+21
61	Satie	Gymnopédies		Unaccompanied piano		1888	82	+21
60	Mozart	Ave verum corpus	K. 618	Motet	D major	1791	57	-3
59	Tchaikovsky	Violin Concerto in D	Op. 35	Concerto	D major	1878	91	+32
58	Mahler	Symphony No. 5		Symphony	C♯ minor	1902	43	-15
57	Sibelius	Finlandia	Op. 26	Symphonic poem		1900	90	+33
56	Ravel	Boléro		Orchestral dance	C major	1928	81	+25
55	Debussy	Claire de lune		Suite for piano		1905	93	+38
54	Sibelius	Violin Concerto in D minor	Op. 47	Concerto	D minor	1903	—	
53	Bach, JS	Goldberg Variations	BWV 988	Theme and variations		1741	56	+3
52	Tchaikovsky	1812 Overture	Op. 49	Overture	E♭ major	1880	61	+9
51	Rachmaninoff	Rhapsody on a Theme of Paganini	Op. 43	Concertante	A minor	1934	51	0
50	Pachelbel	Pachelbel's Canon	PWC 38	Canon and gigue	D major	1694	23	-27
49	Beethoven	Piano Concerto No. 4	Op. 58	Concerto	G major	1806	87	+38
48	Bach, JS	Cantata 147 (including Jesu, Joy of Man's Desiring)	BWV 147	Cantata		1716	11	-37
47	Prokofiev	Romeo and Juliet	Op. 64	Ballet		1935	58	+11
46	Bach, JS	Mass in B minor	BWV 232	Mass	B minor	1749	29	-17
45	Bach, JS	Toccata and Fugue	BWV 565	Toccata and Fugue	D minor	1707	79	+34
44	Puccini	La bohème		Opera		1896	33	-11
43	Mahler	Symphony No. 2 (Resurrection)		Symphony	C minor	1894	62	+19
42	Schubert	String quintet	D. 956	Quintet	C major	1828	28	-14
41	Bizet	Carmen		Opera		1875	—	
40	Tchaikovsky	Swan Lake	Op. 20	Ballet		1876	—	
39	Sibelius	Symphony No. 2	Op. 43	Symphony	D major	1902	—	
38	Bach, JS	Double Violin Concerto	BWV 1043	Concerto	D minor	1731	35	-3
37	Rachmaninoff	Piano Concerto No. 3	Op. 30	Concerto	D minor	1909	—	
36	Gershwin	Rhapsody in Blue		Concerto	B♭ major	1924	73	+37
35	Allegri	Miserere mei, Deus		Setting (Psalm)		1630	9	-26
34	Mozart	Piano Concerto No. 21	K.467	Concerto	C major	1785	31	-3
33	Strauss, R	Four Last Songs	TrV 296	Song		1948	10	-23
32	Mendelssohn	Violin Concerto	Op. 64	Concerto	E minor	1844	89	+57
31	Beethoven	Symphony No. 3 (Eroica)	Op. 55	Symphony	E♭ major	1804	40	+9
30	Pärt	Spiegel im Spiegel			F major	1978	—	
29	Tchaikovsky	Piano Concerto No. 1	Op. 23	Concerto	B♭ minor	1875	74	+45
28	Tchaikovsky	Symphony No. 6 (Pathétique)	Op. 74	Symphony	B minor	1893	—	
27	Mozart	The Marriage of Figaro	K. 492	Opera		1786	67	+40
26	Fauré	Requiem Mass	Op. 48	Mass	D minor	1890	15	-11
25	Bizet	The Pearl Fishers		Opera		1863	7	-18
24	Elgar	Enigma Variations	Op. 36	Theme and variations		1899	24	0
23	Mozart	The Magic Flute	K. 620	Opera		1791	54	+31
22	Rodrigo	Concierto de Aranjuez		Concerto		1939	21	-1
21	Beethoven	Symphony No. 5	Op. 67	Symphony	C minor	1808	42	+21
20	Vaughan Williams	Fantasia on a Theme by Thomas Tallis		Fantasia		1910	25	+5
19	Holst	The Planets	Op. 32	Suite		1916	49	+30
18	Beethoven	Piano Sonata No. 14 (Moonlight)	Op. 27 No. 2	Sonata	C♯ minor	1801	27	+9
17	Schubert	Piano Quintet (Trout)	D. 667	Quintet	A major	1819	18	+1
16	Beethoven	Symphony No. 7	Op. 92	Symphony	A major	1811	80	+64
15	Bach, JS	St Matthew Passion	BWV 244	Setting		1727	12	-3
14	Vaughan Williams	The Lark Ascending				1914	2	-12
13	Saint-Saëns	Symphony No. 3 (Organ Symphony)	Op. 78	Symphony	C minor	1886	45	+32
12	Vivaldi	The Four Seasons	Op. 8	Concerto		1723	16	+4
11	Bruch	Violin Concerto No. 1	Op. 26	Concerto	G minor	1866	14	+3
10	Elgar	Cello Concerto	Op. 85	Concerto	E minor	1919	19	+9
9	Beethoven	Violin Concerto	Op. 61	Concerto	D major	1806	5	-4
8	Mozart	Requiem Mass	K. 626	Mass	D minor	1791	32	+24
7	Rachmaninoff	Piano Concerto No. 2	Op. 18	Concerto	C minor	1901	13	+6
6	Dvořák	Symphony No. 9 (New World Symphony)	Op. 95	Symphony	E minor	1893	52	+46
5	Handel	Messiah	HWV 56	Oratorio		1741	8	+3
4	Mozart	Clarinet Concerto	K. 622	Concerto	A major	1791	1	-3
3	Beethoven	Symphony No. 6 (Pastoral Symphony)	Op. 68	Symphony	F major	1808	6	+3
2	Beethoven	Piano Concerto No. 5 (Emperor Concerto)	Op. 73	Concerto	E♭ major	1811	4	+2
1	Beethoven	Symphony No. 9 (Choral)	Op. 125	Symphony	D minor	1824	3	+2

^{*} The following six songs were broadcast as No. 98 in the countdown:

- Cäcilie – Opus 27 No. 2 (1894).
- Ruhe, meine Seele! – Opus 27 No. 1 (1894).
- Morgen! – Opus 27 No. 4 (1894).
- Meinem Kinde – Opus 37 No. 3 (1898).
- Wiegenlied – Opus 41 No. 1 (1899).
- Zueignung – Opus 10 No. 1 (1885).

== Programming ==
For more information about the works broadcast (including performers and recording details), see ABC Classic FM's programming notes:

- Day 1: Numbers 100 to 90
- Day 2: Numbers 89 to 79
- Day 3: Numbers 78 to 68
- Day 4: Numbers 67 to 52
- Day 5: Numbers 51 to 40
- Day 6: Numbers 39 to 24
- Day 7: Numbers 23 to 12
- Day 8: Numbers 11 to 4
- Day 9: Numbers 3 to 1

== By Composer ==
The following 48 composers were featured in the countdown:

Composer	Nationality	Works^{*}	Works in original survey
Albinoni	Italian	1	1
Allegri	Italian	1	1
Bach, JS	German	7	13
Barber	American	1	1
Beethoven	German	10	11
Berlioz	French	1	0
Bizet	French	2	1
Brahms	German	2	0
Bruch	German	1	1
Chopin	Polish-French	1	1
Debussy	French	1	1
Dvořák	Czech	2	2
Elgar	English	2	4
Fauré	French	1	2
Gershwin	American	1	1
Giazotto	Italian	1	1
Górecki	Polish	1	0
Grieg	Norwegian	2	2
Handel	German-British	2	3
Holst	English	1	1
Khachaturian	Armenian	1	1
Mahler	Austrian	3	3
Mascagni	Italian	1	1
Massenet	French	1	1
Mendelssohn	German	3	1
Mozart	Austrian	10	11
Mussorgsky	Russian	1	0
Orff	German	1	1
Pachelbel	German	1	1
Pärt	Estonian	1	0
Prokofiev	Russian	1	1
Puccini	Italian	2	3
Purcell	English	1	1
Rachmaninoff	Russian	4	2
Ravel	French	2	1
Rimsky-Korsakov	Russian	1	0
Rodrigo	Spanish	1	1
Saint-Saëns	French	1	2
Satie	French	1	1
Schubert	Austrian	5	5
Sibelius	Finnish	4	1
Smetana	Czech	1	1
Strauss, R	German	2	1
Stravinsky	Russian	1	1
Tallis	English	1	0
Tchaikovsky	Russian	7	3
Vivaldi	Italian	1	1
Vaughan Williams	English	2	2

^{*} Note that the number of works above totals to two more than the number of works in the countdown due to:

- Albinoni and Giazotto being entered separately for the same work.
- Mussorgsky and Ravel being entered separately for the same work.

== Original Classic 100 survey ==
The Original Classic 100 countdown was held in 2001. The following 28 works from the original did not appear in the 2010 countdown.

Rank	Composer	Work
22	Bach	Brandenburg Concertos
26	Mozart	Piano Concerto No. 23
34	Bach	Air on the G-String
37	Verdi	Nabucco
41	Schubert	To Music
44	Verdi	Requiem
46	Gluck	"Che farò senza Euridice" from Orpheus and Euridice
47	Wagner	Liebestod from Tristan und Isolde
48	Mozart	Eine kleine Nachtmusik
50	Saint-Saëns	"The Swan" from The Carnival of the Animals
53	Handel	Xerxes
55	Dvořák	"Song to the Moon" from Rusalka
59	Elgar	Pomp and Circumstance
63	Bach	Cantata No. 78, Jesu, der du meine Seele
64	Litolff	Concerto symphonique No. 4 in D minor, Scherzo
65	Elgar	Sea Pictures
66	Caccini, G	Ave Maria
69	Beethoven	Piano Trio (Archduke)
70	Bach	Christmas Oratorio
72	Bach	Chaconne from Partita for Violin No. 2
75	Verdi	La traviata
76	Mahler	Symphony No. 8 in E♭ major
77	Schubert	Impromptu No. 3 in G♭
78	Puccini	"O mio babbino caro" from Gianni Schicchi
86	Beethoven	Piano Sonata No. 8 in C minor (Pathétique)
88	Bach	The Well-Tempered Clavier
96	Mozart	Piano Concerto No. 20 in D minor
100	Fauré	Cantique de Jean Racine

The following composers included in the 2001 countdown did not appear in the 2010 countdown:

- Caccini (or rather Vladimir Vavilov)
- Gluck
- Litolff
- Verdi
- Wagner

== See also ==
- Classic 100 Countdowns
