= Wynford Evans =

Welsh tenor

Wynford Evans (30 April 1946 – 23 September 2009) was a Welsh tenor.

== Early years ==
Wynford Evans was born in Swansea to William Thomas Evans and Lizzie Ann. He had an older brother, Hugh. He was educated at Dyfatty Primary school and then at Dynevor Grammar School for Boys from 1957 to 1963. During his first year in grammar school, Wynford was a regular performer on Radio Wales on a Sunday morning show called Silver Chords which continued for four years. At this time he learned to play the French horn and played with the Glamorgan Schools Orchestra.

In the summer of 1964, at the age of 18, Wynford entered and won the tenor solo for 18 to 25s in the Royal National Eisteddfod which was held that year in his home town of Swansea. Wynford attended The Guildhall School of Music and Drama at John Carpenter Street in London where he was taught singing by Joyce Newton, among others, and after graduating went on to win the Gold Medal for Singers in 1967. In the same year Wynford also won the prestigious Young Welsh Singers Competition held in Cardiff and two years later won the tenor prize for singers at the s’Hertogenbosh International Vocal Competition.

In 1969 he sang in front of Prince Charles during the Prince’s Investiture tour of Wales.

== Career ==
Wynford joined various singing groups including The Linden Singers, the Baccholian Singers, Intimate Opera Company, Phoenix Opera, The Kings Singers and Pro Cantione Antiqua. For ten years Wynford was part of Fortune’s Fire alongside lutenist Carl Shavitz with whom he made a number of early music recordings. Throughout his career, Wynford appeared with all the major orchestras and choruses in the UK as well as touring throughout Europe, Canada, Australia, North and South America, South Africa and the Far East. He made his debut in the U.S.A. in 1987 with the London Early Music Group at Carnegie Hall. Festival appearances included Aix-en-Provence ('Messiah' with John Eliot Gardiner), City of London, Bath, Bach 300, Cardiff, Swansea and Llandaff and many others.

Opera appearances included roles with Netherlands Opera, Welsh National Opera, Kent Opera and Opera de Lyon. His many recordings included Bach's 'B Minor Mass' and Purcell's 'The Fairy Queen', both with Sir John Eliot Gardiner, a recital of Welsh songs in memory of the late David Lloyd, a series of oratorios and sacred works with George Guest and the choir of St. John's, Cambridge, and Vaughan Williams' 'Hugh the Drover'. He performed as a soloist on recordings with Luciano Pavarotti, Plácido Domingo and Joan Sutherland. He broadcast regularly both in Britain and abroad, with oratorio and song recitals and with songs like 'Friday Night is Music Night', 'Melodies For You', and 'Songs from the Shows'. Television appearances included a Channel 4 portrait of Handel, a series featuring songs from musicals and light opera for HTV and the 'Middle of the Road Show’ as well as an appearance on 321 with Dusty Bin. He was also the main soloist on ‘Topping on Sunday’

In 1985, for the 300th anniversary of the births of Handel, Bach and Scarlatti, Wynford sang the tenor solos at a live performance of Handel’s L’Allegro from St John’s, Smith Square. The concert was broadcast to Austria, Belgium, Finland, France, Italy, Spain, Switzerland, West Germany, The German Democratic Republic and the UK. It was heard the following day in Canada, Greece, Iceland, Israel, Norway, Turkey, USA and Yugoslavia. The biggest event Wynford took part in was singing in Cardiff Arms Park on 29th May 1993 as a soloist in front of a choir of 10,000 men with 35,000 people in the stands. It was monumental in scale with Shirley Bassey topping the bill. The event was televised live.

== Teaching ==
In addition to his singing career, Wynford also did private teaching of students of all ages. In 1989 he started teaching and giving master classes with London University at Royal Holloway and Bedford New College. In 2003 he made two trips to South Korea, to oversee and advise on the performance of a well known theatre group in Seoul. He was also an examiner at The Royal Welsh College of Music and Drama in Cardiff.

== Personal life ==
On 8 April 1967 Wynford married Judith Thomas at Dinas Noddfa Baptist Chapel in Swansea. They lived in Englefield Green, Surrey, and had two children – Geraint and Eryl. They later moved to Staines upon Thames where they lived until Wynford’s death on 23 September 2009. He had seven grandchildren.

== Other interests ==
Wynford and his wife ran the Staines St David’s Day Society where he and two other couples organized twenty-five concerts in twenty-two years. He was the President of the Arnside Choral Society and the Life Vice-President of the Egham and District Choral Society. Wynford enjoyed golfing and for seven years ran a Celebrity-Am charity day at Laleham Golf Club on behalf of Scope. His other hobbies included playing bridge, cricket, and watching rugby and horse racing.
