= Jeffrey Reid Baker =

Pianist, composer and arranger

Jeffrey Reid Baker (born c. 1947) is a pianist, composer, arranger best known for his work as a pioneer in the world of computer recording using synthesizers and digital instruments in the mid-1980s. He gained national media attention, from major publications such as the Chicago Tribune, Stereo Review, Digital Audio, and USA Today among others, when he produced four cross-over classical albums - Lisztronique (Now Fantastic Liszt), Rhapsody In Electric Blue, Carmina Burana Synthesized, and Everyone's Favorite Synthesizer Pieces. His work was also featured in both the BMG and Columbia House record clubs in the late 1980s and early 1990s.

During the 1990s, Baker went to work for an Atlanta-based corporation and spent several years composing music in all styles ranging from walking tapes to children's music. His work on a Christmas project led him, in the spring of 1996, to start his own musical production company and record label - JRB Records. Its first release was “A Composer’s Christmas”. And in 1999, Baker released a Rachmaninoff CD containing the Third Piano Concerto in its original 2-Piano form (only recording), and his own arrangement of the Cello Sonata for two-pianos (world premiere). In the year 2000, Baker was asked by the Musicland/Sam Goody chain if he would produce a “Scott Joplin Greatest Hits” album.

Since then JRB Records, he has released “Grand Russian Fantasy” and “Fingerbreakers”. And in 2018 released his most recent album “Concrete Jungle”.
