= In taberna quando sumus =

Medieval Latin poem; part of the Carmina Burana

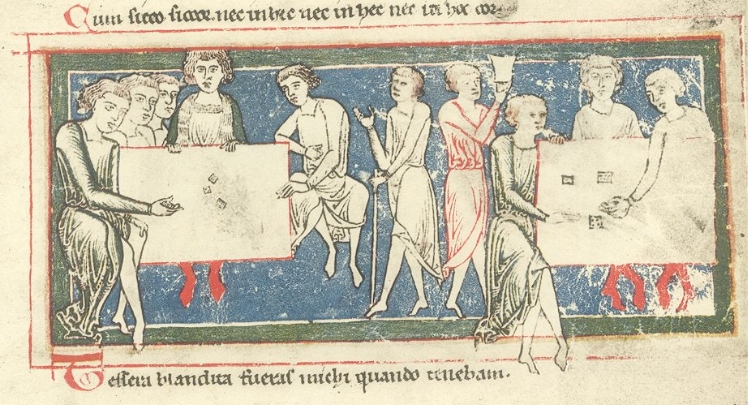
Players and drinkers in the Codex Buranus

"In taberna quando sumus" (English: "When we are in the tavern") is a medieval Latin Goliardic poem, part of the collection known as the Carmina Burana, written between the 12th and early 13th centuries. It was set to music in 1935/36 by German composer Carl Orff as part of his Carmina Burana which premiered at Frankfurt Opera on 8 June 1937. Within Orff's Carmina Burana, this drinking song is the 14th movement in section 2, In Taberna. The poem is largely in trochaic tetrameter. The poem parodies Christian liturgy, with its sequence of drinking toasts mirroring the votive masses and prayers of the Roman Missal, while its closing curse adapts Psalm 68:29 of the Vulgate.

== Carl Orff's lyrics ==
In taberna quando sumus,
non curamus quid sit humus,
sed ad ludum properamus,
cui semper insudamus.
Quid agatur in taberna
ubi nummus est pincerna,
hoc est opus ut queratur,
si quid loquar, audiatur.

Quidam ludunt, quidam bibunt,
quidam indiscrete vivunt.
Sed in ludo qui morantur,
ex his quidam denudantur
quidam ibi vestiuntur,
quidam saccis induuntur.
Ibi nullus timet mortem
sed pro Baccho mittunt sortem:

Primo pro nummata vini,
ex hac bibunt libertini;
semel bibunt pro captivis,
post hec bibunt ter pro vivis,
quater pro Christianis cunctis
quinquies pro fidelibus defunctis,
sexies pro sororibus vanis,
septies pro militibus silvanis.

Octies pro fratribus perversis,
nonies pro monachis dispersis,
decies pro navigantibus
undecies pro discordantibus,
duodecies pro penitentibus,
tredecies pro iter agentibus.
Tam pro papa quam pro rege
bibunt omnes sine lege.

Bibit hera, bibit herus,
bibit miles, bibit clerus,
bibit ille, bibit illa,
bibit servus cum ancilla,
bibit velox, bibit piger,
bibit albus, bibit niger,
bibit constans, bibit vagus,
bibit rudis, bibit magus.

Bibit pauper et egrotus,
bibit exul et ignotus,
bibit puer, bibit canus,
bibit presul et decanus,
bibit soror, bibit frater,
bibit anus, bibit mater,
bibit iste, bibit ille,
bibunt centum, bibunt mille.

Parum sexcente nummate
durant, cum immoderate
bibunt omnes sine meta.
Quamvis bibant mente leta,
sic nos rodunt omnes gentes
et sic erimus egentes.
Qui nos rodunt confundantur
et cum iustis non scribantur.
Io! (9×)

Translation:

When we are in the tavern,
we do not think how we will go to dust,
but we hurry to gamble,
which always makes us sweat.
What happens in the tavern,
where money is host,
you may well ask,
and hear what I say.

Some gamble, some drink,
some behave loosely.
But of those who gamble,
some are stripped bare,
some win their clothes here,
some are dressed in sacks.
Here no-one fears death,
but they throw the dice in the name of Bacchus.

First of all it is to the wine-merchant
the libertines drink,
one for the prisoners,
three for the living,
four for all Christians,
five for the faithful dead,
six for the loose sisters,
seven for the soldiers in the wood,

Eight for the errant brethren,
nine for the dispersed monks,
ten for the seamen,
eleven for the squabblers,
twelve for the penitent,
thirteen for the wayfarers.
To the Pope as to the king
they all drink without restraint.

The mistress drinks, the master drinks,
the soldier drinks, the priest drinks,
the man drinks, the woman drinks,
the servant drinks with the maid,
the swift man drinks, the lazy man drinks,
the white man drinks, the black man drinks,
the settled man drinks, the wanderer drinks,
the stupid man drinks, the wise man drinks,

The poor man drinks, the sick man drinks,
the exile drinks, and the stranger,
the boy drinks, the old man drinks,
the bishop drinks, and the deacon,
the sister drinks, the brother drinks,
the old lady drinks, the mother drinks,
that woman drinks, that man drinks,
a hundred drink, a thousand drink.

Six hundred pennies would hardly
suffice, if everyone
drinks immoderately and immeasurably.
However much they cheerfully drink
we are the ones whom everyone scolds,
and thus we are destitute.
May those who slander us be cursed
and may their names not be written in the book of the righteous.
Io! (9×)

=== Differences from the manuscript ===
The lyrics used by Orff show a change in the last stanza where the original parum durant centum sex nummate / ubi ipsi immoderate is changed to parum sexcente nummate / durant, cum immoderate. The musical arrangement also adds the exclamation io! at the end, repeated nine times.
