= Marie Hayward =

English soprano

Marie Hayward (1939 – November 2011) was an English soprano with a career in opera in the UK as well as overseas. Her work also included concerts and recordings.

Hayward was the daughter of an accountant, George Bower Hayward, and his wife, Mary Isabel née Capon. She studied in London, with Roy Henderson, Tito Gobbi, and Luigi Ricci. She continued her training in Vienna and then at the London Opera Centre.

During her career as a lyric-dramatic soprano she sang with major British companies and appeared frequently in Germany. For Klaus Tennstedt at the Opernhaus Kiel she sang Donna Anna in Don Giovanni and Desdemona in Otello. This was followed by engagements in other prominent German opera houses. In Britain, she sang with Glyndebourne, Scottish Opera and English National Opera. For the Royal Opera she appeared in Die Walküre and Elektra.

Hayward, who had an extensive concert repertoire, appeared with the London orchestras at the Royal Festival Hall and other venues. Her recordings include two of Sir Adrian Boult's Vaughan Williams series for EMI, the Serenade to Music (1969), singing the Eva Turner part, and The Pilgrim's Progress (1972), as one of the Three Shining Ones.

Hayward died in London in November 2011.
