= Joseph Ward (tenor) =

English tenor (1932–2019)

Joseph Ward OBE (22 May 1932 in Preston – 27 April 2019) was an English tenor, formerly a baritone, who created roles in operas by Benjamin Britten and Michael Tippett. He has also made a career as a singing teacher – his pupils include Jane Eaglen – and opera producer.

In the 1950s, he toured with the Carl Rosa Opera, appearing in several operas including the company's final production staged in Nottingham in 1956. As a baritone he created the role of Starveling in Britten's A Midsummer Night's Dream (1960), and in the same year sang the same composer's eponymous hero Billy Budd in the radio-broadcast premiere of the revised two-act version. He became principal baritone at The Royal Opera House, Covent Garden, making his debut there in 1962. He also created the role of Patroclus in Tippett's opera King Priam. He recorded as a baritone the role of Sid in Britten's Albert Herring, conducted by the composer. He subsequently transferred to the tenor repertoire and became Covent Garden's resident principal tenor.

A friend of Joan Sutherland's, he was a principal tenor with the Sutherland-Williamson Grand Opera Company in a 1965 tour of Australia.

In 1966, he appeared in the sole recording of Bernard Herrmann's only opera, Wuthering Heights, conducted by the composer.

In 1972, he founded the Opera School at the Royal Northern College of Music in Manchester and subsequently became Head of Vocal Studies there in 1986. He was appointed an OBE in the 1992 Birthday Honours List for his services.

In Australia, he directed productions of Billy Budd and Ralph Vaughan Williams's The Pilgrim's Progress. He sang as a tenor in the first recording of the latter opera, conducted by Sir Adrian Boult. He died on 27 April 2019. He was a teacher at the Queensland Conservatorium of Music.
