= Raymond Wolansky =

American opera singer (1926–1998)

- Born: 15 February 1926; Cleveland, Ohio, U.S.
- Died: 1 December 1998 (aged 72); Warmbronn near Stuttgart, Germany
- Occupation: Operatic baritone
- Organizations: Staatsoper Stuttgart
- Awards: Order of Merit of Baden-Württemberg

Raymond Wolansky (15 February 1926 – 1 December 1998) was an American operatic baritone who made a career in Europe. A long-term member of the Staatsoper Stuttgart, he appeared in leading roles such as Verdi's Nabucco and Rigoletto at international opera houses and festivals, including world premieres.

== Life ==
Wolansky was born in 1926 in Cleveland, Ohio, as the son of Ukrainian immigrants. He was trained as a singer in Cleveland and Boston. From 1948 to 1950 he sang minor parts for the New England Opera Company. He made his official stage debut as Silvio in Leoncavallo's Pagliacci in Milwaukee in 1950.

In order to gain ensemble experience, he then, like many young American singers at the time, went to Europe. After studies in Graz with Stoja von Milinkovič, he performed from 1954 in Lucerne and from 1956 at the Oper Graz. In the 1957/58, he appeared as a guest as Verdi's Rigoletto at the Staatstheater Stuttgart, which earned him a contract with the theatre and was the beginning of an international career. He remained for more 30 years as one of the theatre's leading singers.

Wolansky also appeared as a guest internationally, including in the title role of Verdi's Nabucco at the Opernhaus Zürich in 1954, in 1959 as Count Almaviva in Mozart's Le nozze di Figaro, and in 1962 as Amfortas in Wagner's Parsifal at the Teatro Colón in Buenos Aires. He appeared at festivals such as the Glyndebourne, Edinburgh and Schwetzingen, where he played the title role of Hermann Reutter's Der Tod des Empedokles in its world premiere in 1966. In 1972, he took part in the American premiere of Einem's Der Besuch der alten Dame at the San Francisco Opera. There, he also appeared in 1972 as Ashton in a performance of Donizetti's Lucia di Lammermoor which was recorded live, conducted by Jesús López Cobos, with Beverly Sills in the title role and Luciano Pavarotti as Edgardo. He performed alongside Joan Sutherland, Leontyne Price, Inge Borkh, Shirley Verrett, Alfredo Kraus, Nicolai Gedda, Sándor Kónya, Plácido Domingo, Nicolai Ghiaurov and Martti Talvela.

From 1970 until his death at age 72, Wolansky lived in Warmbronn near Stuttgart.

== Honours ==
- 1979: Order of Merit of Baden-Württemberg
