= John Carol Case =

English baritone (1923–2012)

John Carol Case OBE (27 April 1923 – 28 December 2012) was an English baritone.

== Early life ==
Case was born in Salisbury, England. Awarded a choral scholarship at King's College, Cambridge, he graduated with MA and BMus degrees.

== Early career ==
One of England's leading baritones in oratorio and lieder, in the mid-1950s he became associated with all the great choral societies and festivals. He served as Director of Music at King's College School in Wimbledon, and also as National Music Advisor to the Townswomen's Guilds. A regular broadcaster on BBC radio, he performed on television and in concert throughout Europe and Canada.

== Recordings ==
Case recorded widely for EMI and Lyrita, especially choral works, songs and opera. One of his early performances was in EMI’s recording of Gilbert and Sullivan's opera The Yeomen of the Guard, in the small role of Second Yeoman, conducted by Sir Malcolm Sargent. His choral recordings include solo parts in Bach’s St Matthew Passion (with both Vaughan Williams and Otto Klemperer), Fauré’s Requiem and numerous works by Elgar and Vaughan Williams. Among his opera performances is as the Evangelist in Sir Adrian Boult’s recording of Vaughan Williams’s The Pilgrim’s Progress. His English song recordings include the works of Gerald Finzi, notably the Hardy song cycles for baritone.

== Retirement ==
John Carol Case retired from the concert platform in 1976 to concentrate on teaching singing. In 1976 the Royal Academy made him an honorary RAM, and in 1993 he was awarded OBE for services to music. For All Saints Church, Thornton-le-Dale, he wrote carols, which have been published by Banks Music Publications.

== Literature ==
- Entries to John Carol Case in WorldCat
