= Sheila Armstrong (singer) =

English opera singer

Dr. Sheila Armstrong
- Born: 13 August 1942 (age 83); Ashington, Northumberland, England
- Education: Royal Academy of Music
- Occupation: opera singer
- Years active: 1965–1993
- Known for: soprano
- Awards: Mozart Prize, Kathleen Ferrier Award

Dr. Sheila Armstrong (born 13 August 1942) is an English soprano, equally noted for opera, oratorio, symphonic music and lieder.

Armstrong was born in Ashington. Educated at the Royal Academy of Music, she was winner of the Mozart Prize and of the Kathleen Ferrier Award in 1965, and was a trustee of the award fund.

She was active in English opera and oratorio from 1965, making her Covent Garden debut in 1983, and appeared in concert and recitals, again mainly in England. She also made many recordings, notably of English music.

Armstrong retired in 1993, at the age of 51.
