= Path of Miracles =

2005 composition by Joby Talbot

- Choral music by Joby Talbot
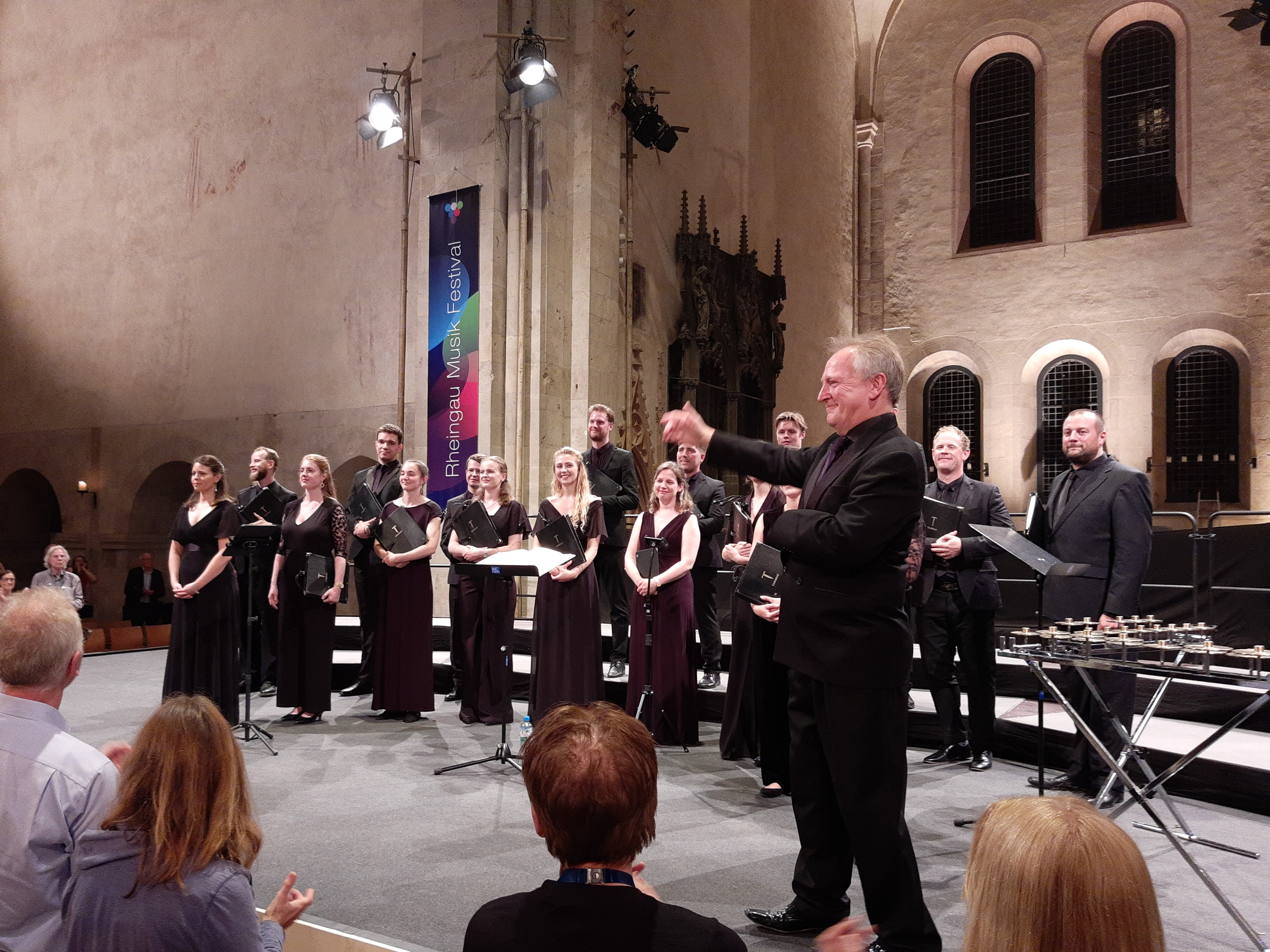
- Tenebrae after a 2023 Rheingau Musik Festival performance
- Text: by Robert Dickinson
- Language: Greek, Latin, Spanish, Basque, French, English and German
- Based on: Dum Pater Familias (pilgrims songs)
- Composed: 2005
- Dedication: memory of Vincent Talbot
- Performed: 17 July 2005, London
- Movements: four
- Scoring: mixed choir; crotales

Path of Miracles is an extended choral composition by Joby Talbot, written in 2005 following a commission from the vocal chamber group Tenebrae. Under the direction of Nigel Short, Tenebrae's first performance was scheduled for 7 July 2005 in London, but was delayed because of the bombings that took place in the city that day. The City of London Festival quickly rescheduled the event, and the world premiere took place on 17 July 2005 at St. Bartholomew-the-Great Church in London.

== Synopsis ==
A pilgrimage in composition, Path of Miracles is a journey, as the four movement titles (Roncesvalles, Burgos, León and Santiago) are the four main posts along the Camino de Santiago, one of the most taxing pilgrimage routes in the Catholic tradition. Using selections from the medieval texts Codex Calixtinus and Miragres de Santiago and from Roman Catholic liturgy, Path of Miracles incorporates musical styles from the Taiwanese Bunun people to the pilgrims' hymn Dum Pater Familias, and is sung in Greek, Latin, Spanish, Basque, French, English and German. Robert Dickinson is the librettist and the composition is scored a cappella for SSSSSAAAATTTTBBBB and published by Chester Novello.

Path of Miracles is dedicated to the memory of Talbot's father, Vincent Talbot (1916-2005).

=== Roncesvalles ===
The opening movement, Roncesvalles, begins Path of Miracles at a geographically popular starting point for the pilgrimage. As the choir begins a mysterious glissando (termed Pasiputput, from the Bunun people), travel is ingrained in the stage direction, calling the tenors and basses from offstage to join the main choir. The aura is open and overwhelming as multiple languages and sound clusters of E major and E minor fill the air, finally climaxing with a fortissimo E minor chord featuring "bells", played by crotales. Talbot uses ostinatos throughout the composition extensively, emulating the long walk endured by the pilgrims. Talbot also employs clashing tonalities, encapsulating the pain endured physically as well as the intense mental contemplation that a pilgrimage necessitates. While the basses drone pedal tones, a slow rhythmic transformation develops into a driving engine that, with gradually shorter and more syncopated rhythms, propels the music forward. In all, Roncesvalles replays the life and martyrdom of St. James and conveys how his body came to rest in Santiago.

=== Burgos ===
Burgos is epitomized with the final lines: Ora pro nobis, Jacobe/A finibus terrae ad te clamavi (Pray for us, O Jacob/From the end of the earth I cry to you). A direct quote from Psalm 61, Burgos is a prayer. Reflecting on disease, death and other tests of faith, this movement is written for the penitent as the reality of the pilgrimage sets in. Beginning in a homophonic choral setting, as the movement progresses the voices gain independence, become polyphonic, and encapsulate the impressive church and bells at Burgos.

=== León ===
Voices of the angelic choir herald León, the last post remaining before Santiago, a stark contrast to the pleading prayers evoked in Burgos. Ostinatos, like previous movements, are the backdrop Talbot uses to set his melodies, like a psalm-tone in Gregorian chant. The harmonies are more consonant, and even the texts reflect a hopeful and aspiring love: Beate, qui habitant in domo tua, Domine; In saecula saeculorum laudabant te (Blessed are they that dwell in thy house: they will be still praising thee [Psalm 84:4]). Diatonic and step-wise in motion, the simplicity of melody is a chant, a song of wonder, for the graces of God's gifts.

=== Santiago ===
Reminiscent of the melody from Roncesvalles, the opening chant for Santiago is a lone voice recalling the scenery and difficulties of the journey thus far. A soloist speaks, in English, of the landscape and road to Santiago, while the supporting choir begins the rhythmic drive first encountered in Roncesvalles. Talbot employs Debussy-like planing harmonies, creating tonal ambiguity while the bass melody is employed as the driving rhythmic engine that propels the movement into the joyous following section (e.g. Figure 4, m.1 G major chord with A added, leading to a dominant 7th E minor chord, m. 2 G MM7 to a F-sharp minor/major 7th, then sequence repeats). The spirit and joy of the end to the physically and spiritually tumultuous journey, Dickinson uses the liturgical language of Latin to phrase his comments on the saint's life, the choir singing a prayer to St. James:

O beate Jacobe
Virtus nostra vere
Nobis hostes remove
Tuos ac tuere
Ac devotos adibe
Nos tibi placere.

Jacobo propicio
Veniam speramus
et quas ex obsequio
Merito debemus
Patri tam eximio
Dignes laudes demus.

Oh blessed James,
truly our strength,
take our enemies from us
and protect your people,
and cause us, your faithful servants,
to please you.

James, let us hope
for pardon through your favor,
and let us give
the worthy praise,
which we rightfully owe
to so excellent a father.

At the sight of the end ahead, the pilgrims' hymn is heard again. The choir sings a jubilant aspiration to heaven while slowly walking offstage, symbolizing a turning away to reflection, worship and prayer.

== Performances and recordings ==
The choral groups Tenebrae, The Crossing, Conspirare, Volti, The Singers, Tonus Peregrinus, the Elora Festival Singers, The Capital Chamber Choir, The Giovanni Consort, Roots in the Sky, and the Vancouver Chamber Choir have performed Path of Miracles publicly in concert. Other notable performances have included:

- The University of Michigan Chamber Choir gave a performance in 2010 in Ann Arbor, Michigan.
- The Virginia Chorale performed the work in 2014 in Norfolk, Virginia.
- The Boston Choral Ensemble, under the direction of Andrew Shenton, performed The Path of Miracles twice in 2014 in Boston and again in 2019 at the Mission Church.
- The Giovanni Consort gave the Australian premiere of the work in Perth, Western Australia, in November 2014.
- The chamber choir Viva Voce, conducted by John Rosser, gave the first full New Zealand performance of Path of Miracles in 2016, in Auckland, before performing it in Napier and Wellington the following year.
- The Durham University Chamber Choir gave a performance in February 2018 in the historic setting of the Durham Cathedral chapter house.
- In June 2018, Yale Schola Cantorum toured the Camino de Santiago, singing masses and performing the piece in its entirety at cathedrals in each of the four main cities.
- The Sydney Philharmonia Chamber Choir gave two performances of Path of Miracles in 2018, on 17 August at the Riverview Theatre, Parramatta, and on the following day in the crypt of St Mary's Cathedral, Sydney. Both performances were conducted by Brett Weymark.
- The chamber choir Audite performed Path of Miracles in Helsinki and Tampere in November and December 2018.
- The chamber choir CONSONO, conducted by Harald Jers, gave seven performances in Germany in 2018 and 2019.
- The Icelandic chamber choir Hljómeyki performed the piece twice in 2019: at Kristskirkja, Reykjavík, on 25 April and at Skálholtskirkja, South Iceland, on 27 April, both conducted by Þorvaldur Örn Davíðsson.
- Voces Boreales of Montreal as well as Pro Coro Canada of Edmonton, both under the direction of Michael Zaugg, have performed the piece in various Canadian venues.
- The Edinburgh Singers have performed the piece three times in Scotland: at St Mary's Episcopal Cathedral, Edinburgh on 23 March 2024, in St Michael's Parish Church, Linlithgow on 31 October 2026 and in Glasgow Cathedral on 1 November 2026.
- The Princeton University Chamber Choir gave a performance in 2025 in Princeton, New Jersey, conducted by Gabriel Crouch.
- CONCORA (the Connecticut Choral Artists) gave a partially staged performance in February 2025 in the chapel of Trinity College in Hartford, Connecticut, with guest conductor Ellen Gilson Voth and dance company, Ekklesia Contemporary Dance, including all optional bass pedal tones.
- Polyphonic Voices (Melbourne) gave two performances in 2025, on 13 September at St Patrick's Cathedral, Ballarat, and on the 19 September at St Patrick's Cathedral, Melbourne. Both performances were conducted by Michael Fulcher.
- The London Oriana Choir is due to perform Path of Miracles at Holy Trinity Church, Sloane Square on 13 March 2026, with soloists from Tenebrae, under the baton of Dominic Ellis-Peckham.
- The Dallas-based Orpheus Chamber Singers performed Path of Miracles in Dallas and Fort Worth, Texas, from May 1 to 3, 2026, under the direction of JD Burnett.
- The Pittsburgh based chamber choir, Voces Solis (under the direction of Ryan Keeling), performed Path of Miracles at the Hope Lutheran Church in Cranberry Township, Pennsylvania on June 6, 2026.

Path of Miracles was given its first full theatrical staging by British director John La Bouchardière at Spoleto Festival USA in May 2019, performed by Westminster Choir College, with lighting design by Scott Zielinski.

There are two recordings of the composition, one by Tenebrae with Nigel Short conducting, produced by Gabriel Crouch and distributed by Signum Classics, and the other by Conspirare with Craig Hella Johnson conducting. There is a recording of the third movement, "León", by Tenebrae on Signum Classics.
