= Bigden =

Bigden is an English surname. Notable people with the surname include:

- James Bigden (1880–after 1910), English footballer
- Alf Bigden (1932–2007), British drummer
