= Christopher Gabbitas =

Christopher and Stephanie Gabbitas at the 2019 Grammy Awards Ceremony in Los Angeles

Christopher Alan Gabbitas, is a choral conductor, lawyer and university professor.

A former baritone with the King's Singers, he was born on 15 May 1979 in Plymouth, the son of Dr. Brian and Mrs Evelyn Gabbitas. The family moved to Kent after his father ended a career as a Royal Naval Officer and switched to the world of academia.

== Education and career ==
Gabbitas sang as a boy-chorister in the choir of Rochester Cathedral in Kent, south-east England, attending The King's School, Rochester, before winning a music scholarship to Uppingham School in Rutland. He went to St John's College, Cambridge, in 1997 as a choral scholar where he sang under Christopher Robinson and studied law; he was part of, and occasionally directed, "The Gentlemen of St John's." He also sang with "Collegium Regale," the modern-day equivalent of The King's Singers at King's College, and Cibus Amoris, and enjoyed a full part in university musical life, singing in and directing numerous performances of diverse choral repertoire. After graduating in 2000 with a bachelor's degree in law, he attended the Oxford Institute of Legal Practice and sang as a lay clerk in the choir of Christ Church Cathedral, Oxford. In 2001, he began training to be a lawyer with the London firm, Stephenson Harwood, qualifying as a Solicitor of the Supreme Court in 2003.

Whilst practising as a lawyer he maintained his singing career, performing with many groups including Polyphony, The English Concert, The King's Consort, and in the inaugural concert of European Voices in a performance of Wagner's "Parsifal" at the BBC Proms under Sir Simon Rattle. He also sang as a Gentleman of the Temple Church (of "Da Vinci Code" fame) under Stephen Layton, where he performed in Sir John Tavener's epic work "The Veil of the Temple" in 2003.

He joined The King's Singers as their 2nd Baritone in early 2004, following an extensive audition process, deciding to put his legal career on hold. During his time in the group he acted as Managing Partner and effective in-house legal counsel, presiding over a successful period of growth and renewal in the ensemble's history, and celebrating both the group's 40th and 50th Anniversaries in 2008 and 2018 respectively. Gabbitas toured across six continents, performing around 2,000 concerts in over 50 countries worldwide and recording in excess of 30 albums during his tenure in the group. During this time, Gabbitas made several broadcasts for BBC Radio 4, presenting documentaries which looked at aspects of the singing voice and choral performance. He left the ensemble, along with Countertenor Timothy Wayne-Wright, at the end of 2018.

In The King's Singers 50th Anniversary GOLD Book, Gabbitas credits his initial colleagues in the ensemble, including David Hurley, Philip Lawson and Stephen Connolly, as being formative influences in his continuing musical career. Hurley and Connolly, in particular, sang with two of the original members of the group and were therefore easily able to pass down the principles of sound, balance and blend that were the hallmarks of the early group's performances and recordings. Lawson's arranging style, which owed much to Bob Chilcott (another former member of The King's Singers), informed Gabbitas' own choral arrangements and position on building choral sound from the bass upwards.

In early 2019 Gabbitas was appointed artistic director of the Phoenix Chorale, an American Grammy Award-winning chamber ensemble based in Phoenix, Arizona, succeeding Charles Bruffy. As Artistic Director Gabbitas has started a new path for the Phoenix Chorale by doing a Master Works Program. During the same year Gabbitas also took up a position as Artist Professor at the University of Redlands in California, USA, teaching a unique Master of Music degree in Vocal Chamber Music and Commercial Music-Making.

He maintains a position as consultant solicitor with Keystone Law, recognised as one of the most innovative legal service providers in the UK, advising on creative commercial matters.

== Awards and recognition ==
Gabbitas won a choral scholarship to St John's College, Cambridge in 1997. During his time with the King's Singers, Gabbitas won two Grammy Awards and was nominated for a third, as well as winning a MIDEM Award. The ensemble was inducted into the inaugural Gramophone Hall of Fame in 2013.

== Personal life ==
Whilst on tour in America in late 2004, he met Stephanie Seales, a musical theatre actress and successful businesswoman who set up one of the largest babyballet franchise operations in the UK.

They married in the summer of 2006 in America and England, and with their three daughters divide their time between a home in England and family in the US.
