= Nel mezzo del cammin di nostra vita =

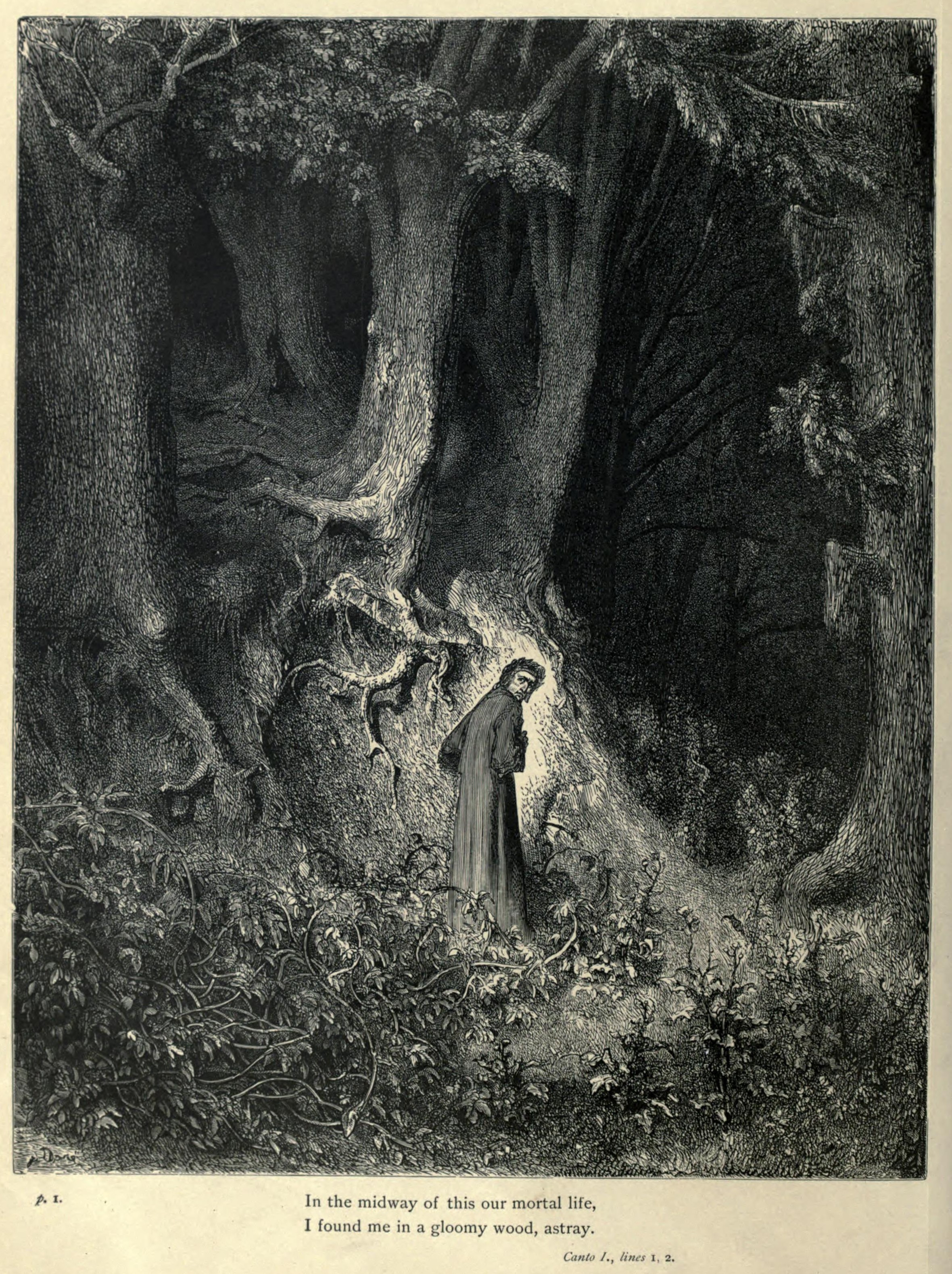
Gustave Doré: La selva oscura

Nel mezzo del cammin di nostra vita (English: Midway upon the journey of our life) is the first line of the Divine Comedy by Dante Alighieri; it constitutes the incipit of the first book of the Inferno and, by extension, the entire poem. According with the rhythmic structure of the poem, the line is structured as a hendecasyllable.

The reference most often cited as an inspiration for these words is the Convivio (IV 23, 6-10): “the high point of this bow [of earthly life], as I believe it [to be], is through the 30s and 40s, and I believe that it is perfectly naturalised in the 35th year”. This conception has a biblical basis in Psalm 90:10: “The days of our years are threescore years and ten; and if by reason of strength they be fourscore years, yet is their strength labour and sorrow; for it is soon cut off, and we fly away.” and in the Song of King Hezekiah in Isaiah 38:10 which conerned the outcome of this maturation: “I said in the cutting off of my days, I shall go to the gates of the grave: I am deprived of the residue of my years.”

Guido da Pisa, among the earliest critics of Dante’s poem, interpreted the "mezzo del cammin di nostra vita (midst of the journey of our life)" as referring to the sun (as we are asleep for half of our lives), which emphasises a dreamlike aspect, almost a trance, in Dante’s inspiration.

Various commentators have considered that "nostra vita (our life)" does not refer solely to the life of the poet, but also to the entire life of mankind, with the year 1300 - based on other references in the poem - being the central year of a 13,000 year cosmic chronology beginning with the creation of the world and of Adam, and ending with the Last Judgement.
