= Robert Mealy =

Robert Mealy is a performer and teacher of baroque violin. He holds a joint position at the Yale School of Music and the Department of Music of Yale University, where he directs the Yale Collegium Musicum and teaches classes in musical rhetoric and historically-informed performance. He has recorded over 50 CDs of early music, ranging from Hildegard of Bingen with Sequentia, to Renaissance consorts with the Boston Camerata, to Rameau operas with Les Arts Florissants. At home in New York, he is a frequent leader and soloist with the New York Collegium, Early Music New York, the Clarion Music Society, and the ARTEK early music ensemble.

Mealy began exploring early music in high school, first with the collegium musicum of the University of California, Berkeley and then with the baroque orchestra at the Royal College of Music in London. While still an undergraduate at Harvard College, he was asked to join the Canadian baroque orchestra Tafelmusik. Since then, he has recorded and toured with many early music ensembles, including (from early to late) Sequentia, Ensemble Project Ars Nova, the Newberry Consort, the Folger Consort, Les Arts Florissants, and the Handel and Haydn Society. He has toured with the Mark Morris Dance Group and accompanied Renée Fleming on the David Letterman Show.

Mealy has been concertmaster of the Boston Early Music Festival Orchestra since 2004, and has led them in performances, a Grammy-winning recording of Charpentier's "Descente d'Orphée aux enfers" and "La couronne des fleurs," Grammy-nominated recordings of Lully’s Psyché and Thésée, and other recordings including Steffani's Niobe, Handel's Acis and Galatea, and Conradi’s Ariadne, as well as in the modern premiere of Mattheson’s Boris Godenouw.

A devoted chamber musician, he is a member of the Renaissance violin band The King's Noyse, and the seventeenth-century ensemble Quicksilver. He served for over a decade as an instrumental soloist and leader with the Boston Camerata. Through his interest in earlier repertories, he co-founded the medieval ensemble Fortune's Wheel, which appeared at the Boston and Berkeley early music festivals and on early music concert series across America, as well as at the Cloisters and the Frick Museum in New York, the Tage Alter Musik, and the International Early Music Festival of Mexico City.

In 2009, Mealy joined the new historical performance faculty at the Juilliard School. In June 2012, he became Director of the program, where he also teaches seminars on performance practice and coaches chamber music.

In 2008, he was appointed Professor (Adjunct) at Yale University, where he is director of the Yale Collegium. At Yale, his instrumental ensemble, the Yale Collegium Players, has collaborated with Simon Carrington and the Yale Schola Cantorum in recordings of Biber, Bertali, and the Johannes Passion of Bach, as well as Magnificats by Bach and Mendelssohn. He also directs a one-year postgraduate intensive program of study on baroque strings. Prior to his work at Yale, he founded and directed the Harvard Baroque Chamber Orchestra for ten years. In 2004 he received Early Music America’s Binkley Award for outstanding teaching and scholarship, recognizing his work at Yale and Harvard. He has also lectured and taught historical performance workshops at Columbia, Brown, Rutgers, Oberlin, and U.C. Berkeley. He also teaches historical improvisation and technique at summer workshops across North America, including the Madison Early Music Festival.
