= Philip Lawson =

Philip Lawson may refer to:

- Philip Lawson (author), pseudonym of Michael Bishop in collaboration with Paul Di Filippo
- Philip Lawson (composer), composer, arranger and baritone singer
