= Paul Phoenix =

Paul Phoenix is the name of:

- Paul Phoenix (singer), former tenor in the King's Singers (1997-2014) and founder of PurpleVocals
- Paul Phoenix (Tekken), a video game character in the Tekken series
