= Princeton Glee Club =

University choir for Princeton University

Princeton University Glee Club

Background information
- Origin: Princeton University
- Genres: Choral
- Years active: 1874–present
- Website: www.princetongleeclub.com

The Princeton University Glee Club is the oldest and most prestigious choir at Princeton University, composed of approximately 100 mixed voices. They give multiple performances throughout the year featuring music from Renaissance to Modern, and also tour internationally biannually. They have performed recently with Chanticleer, The King's Singers, Bobby McFerrin, Roomful of Teeth, Calmus, and a collection of the world's premier oktavists. Currently the Glee Club is led by Gabriel Crouch.

== General information ==
The Princeton University Glee Club is the oldest singing group in existence at Princeton. It was founded in 1874 by Andrew Fleming West '74, who later became the first Dean of the Graduate College. The Glee Club recently celebrated its 150th season of concerts.

In 1907, Charles E. Burnham was the first professional musician to lead the Glee Club. He was succeeded in 1918 by Alexander Russell, who served until 1934, when the Glee Club became a responsibility of the music faculty. James Giddings became director in 1934, Timothy Cheney in 1940, J. Merrill Knapp in 1941, Russell Ames Cook in 1943, J. Merrill Knapp again in 1946, Elliot Forbes in 1952, Carl Weinrich in 1953, Walter L. Nollner in 1958, William Trego in 1992, Richard Tang Yuk in 1994, Robert Isaacs in 2009, and Gabriel Crouch since 2010.

On the eve of the College football games in 1913, the Glee Club held its first concerts with the Glee Clubs of Harvard and Yale Universities, beginning a tradition of joint concerts that have continued to this day.

The Princeton University Glee Club was involved in some remarkable projects in the 1930s. They gave the American Premiere of Stravinsky's Oedipus Rex with Leopold Stokowski and the Philadelphia Orchestra in 1931; performances of Schoenberg's Gurrelieder and Wagner's Parsifal in 1932 and 1933; Bach's Mass in B Minor at the Metropolitan Opera House in 1935; and with the Vassar College Choir, gave the first United States performance of Jean Philippe Rameau's Castor et Pollux in 1937.

The Glee Club continued to sing with women's choral groups from Vassar, Bryn Mawr, Wellesley, Mount Holyoke, and Smith Colleges until a mixed Princeton chorus was formed after the advent of coeducation.

From 1958 to 1992 Walter L. Nollner led the Glee Club, giving him the honor of the longest tenure of any previous conductor. Under his direction, the choir traveled outside the United States for the first time, establishing a pattern of international concert tours to Europe, Asia, South America and the South Pacific, including two around-the-world tours. In honour of Professor Nollner's service to the Glee Club, an endowment fund has been established in his name to assist the Glee Club with its yearly operations. The Nollner Endowment Fund was officially launched in February 1999.

The Glee Club has continued their tradition of overseas concert tours (most recently traveling to Buenos Aires, Paris, Leipzig, Prague, South Africa, Spain, and Mexico) and expanded the repertoire to include more works of the twentieth and twenty-first centuries. The Glee Club presents several concerts in Alexander Hall on the Princeton campus. They perform a major oratorio each spring with professional soloists and orchestra. Recent masterworks performed include Orff's Carmina Burana, Mendelssohn's Elijah, Bach's St. Matthew Passion and Mass in B minor, Mozart's Requiem, and Honneger's Le Roi David.
