= Rebecca Carrington =

British "music comedian"

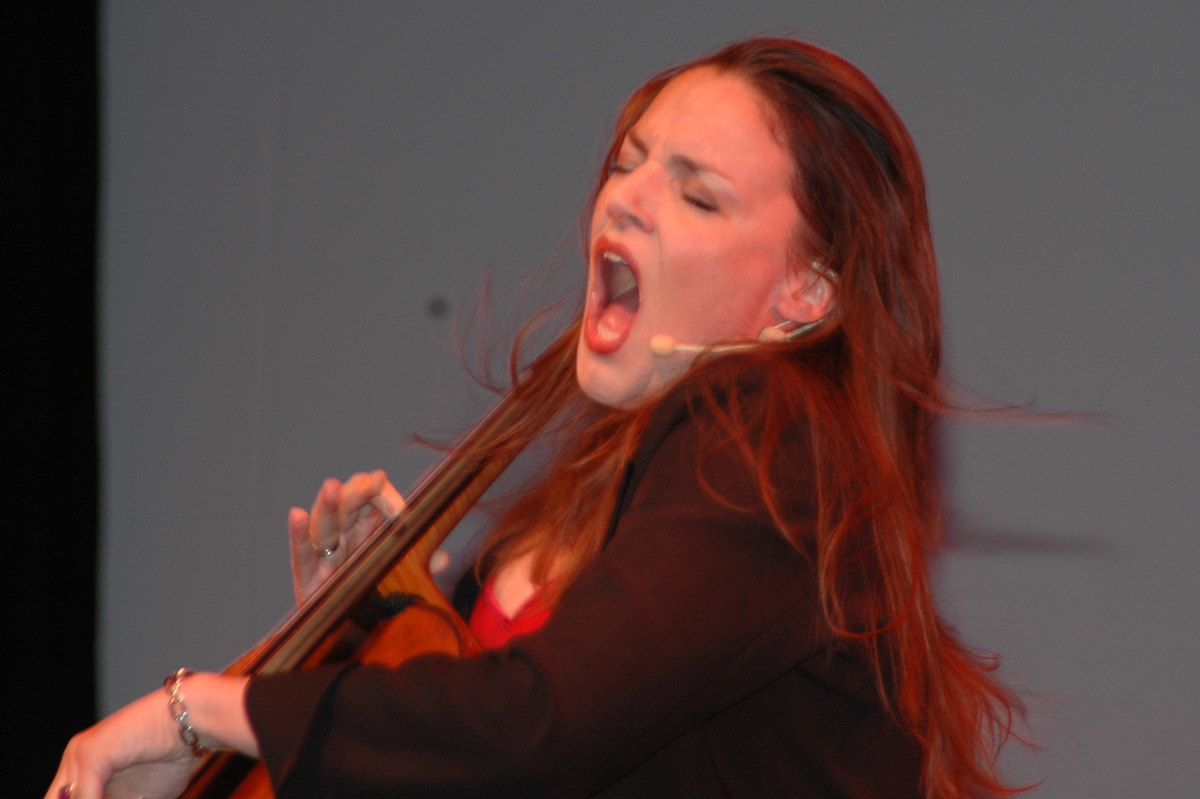
- Carrington in 2009
- Born: 17 January 1971 (age 55); Epsom, Surrey, England

Rebecca Carrington is an English "music comedian". She is notable for a wide variety of spoofs of a variety of musical genres, starring Joe, her 18th century cello.

== Life ==
Carrington lives with her husband, Colin Brown, in Berlin. She studied at Wells Cathedral School and The Royal Northern College of Music and then went to complete her Masters of Music at Rice University in Houston, Texas. She is the daughter of Simon Carrington, a British conductor and founder of the vocal ensemble The King's Singers.

== Career ==
She has performed with many orchestras such as the London Symphony Orchestra, London Philharmonic Orchestra, Royal Philharmonic Orchestra, the Philharmonia and the BBC Symphony Orchestra.

Her comedy career started on stage while in the USA. One of her shows is called Me And My Cello.

== Awards ==
Rebecca Carrington won several awards, including the Prix Pantheon in June 2007 (a German cabaret award) and Prix du public (an audience prize) at a comedy festival in Versailles in April 2007.
