= Mother and Child (Tavener) =

Choral work by John Tavener

- Choral music by John Tavener
- Text: poem by Brian Keeble
- Composed: 2002
- Publisher: Chester Music
- Duration: 10 minutes
- Scoring: SATB choir; organ; temple gong

Premiere
- Conductor: Nigel Short
- Performers: Tenebrae

Mother and Child is a choral composition by John Tavener written in 2002 on a commission from the Tenebrae vocal ensemble. The lyrics were written by Brian Keeble. The music is set for a choir in up to nine vocal parts, organ and temple gong. The duration is about 10 minutes. The composition was first recorded by Tenebrae in 2003 on an album of the same name, conducted by Nigel Short. The work was published by Chester Music in 2004.

== History ==
John Tavener composed Mother and Child in 2002 on a commission from Tenebrae. The lyrics were written by Brian Keeble in English, with interspersed Sanskrit. The composition was published by Chester Music in 2004.

== Text and music ==
The poem by Brian Keeble celebrates motherhood, especially that of Mary to Jesus. It is a recurring theme in Tavener's compositions. It comes combined with the concept of infinite theophanic light, which occurs commonly in religious traditions. The text begins: "Enamoured by its gaze, the mother's gaze in turn contrives a single bearn of light! Along which love may move". The following refrain, Hail Maria, alludes to Hail Mary, but continues "Hail Sophia" (or Holy Wisdom). At the climax, Tavener quotes the Sanskrit "atma".

The music is set for a choir in four parts, at times subdivided (SSAATTBBB), organ and temple gong. It is marked "Ecstatic, flowing". It is written without bar lines. The music begins with the choir alone, divided first in four parts and moving in a dense texture in mostly homophony, with the tenor voice leading the melody, and the other parts moving in steady half notes. The music begins very softly (pp), growing steadily but very gradually and never louder than mezzo-piano (mp). The following refrain alludes to Russian Orthodox chant, with three upper voices (tenor and two sopranos) in parallel chords, and with the lower voices supporting at a slower pace. It pensively addresses Maria and Sophia, pp throughout, only the second acclamation of Maria grows to mezzo-forte over a melisma on her name.

After several stanzas in growing intensity, the choir is joined at the climax by a forceful pipe organ that adds pulses to the singing, and strokes on a Hindu temple gong. The music then returns to another contemplative "Hail Maria ..." prayer.

== Album ==
The composition became the centerpiece of a 2003 album of the same name by Tenebrae, conducted by Nigel Short, along with other contemporary sacred music.
