= Keith Critchlow =

British architect and author (1933–2020)

- Born: Keith Barry Critchlow; 16 March 1933
- Died: 8 April 2020 (aged 87); Kingston-Upon-Thames, London, England
- Education: Summerhill School; St Martins School of Art; Royal College of Art
- Occupations: Professor of architecture and author
- Known for: Sacred architecture design and analysis, founder of Visual Islamic and Traditional Arts (VITA) school, co-founder of the Temenos Academy

Keith Barry Critchlow (16 March 1933 – 8 April 2020) was a British artist, lecturer, author, sacred geometer, professor of architecture, and a co-founder of the Temenos Academy in the UK.

== Biography ==
Critchlow was educated at the Summerhill School, St Martins School of Art, and the Royal College of Art.

He performed national service in the Royal Air Force (RAF) from 1951 to 1953. In the Air Force he met artist Frank Bowling. Bowling, who became a close friend, was hosted by Critchlow’s family as a guest in their home after his demobilisation from the RAF.

Having been originally trained as a classical painter, Critchlow went on to study sacred geometry and authored many books on geometry, including Order in Space; Islamic Patterns: An Analytical and Cosmological Approach; Time Stands Still and the Hidden Geometry of Flowers. He also contributed forewords to English editions of works by Titus Burckhardt, Frithjof Schuon, and others.

Critchlow was a lecturer at the Architectural Association (AA) School of Architecture in London for twelve years. While at the AA, he was invited to teach at Kwame Nkrumah University of Science and Technology in Ghana by R. Buckminster Fuller, the American engineer, architect and futurist.

Buckminster Fuller wrote of Critchlow:

Keith Critchlow has one of the century’s rare conceptual minds. He is continually inspired by the conceptioning of both earliest and latest record. He lauds the work of others while himself pouring forth, in great modesty, whole vista-filling new realizations of nature’s mathematical structuring.… He is one of the most inspiring scholar-teachers I have had the privilege to know.

While in Ghana, Critchlow and his colleague Michael Ben-Eli studied Fuller geometry and experimented in the construction of geodesic domes using local building materials, such as palm, bamboo and aluminium. One of their aims was to help reduce use of concrete and minimise the negative impact of construction on the environment.

In 1969, Critchlow formed Polyhedral Developments (a private company) in partnership with architectural designer Hayward Hill; together they pioneered the use of polyhedral domes as emergency shelters for families who had lost their homes to disaster. Critchlow and colleagues experimented in the use of lightweight materials for the construction of domes, including Tri-Wall Pak corrugated board, to aid in transport and assembly by unskilled labour in disaster areas.

Critchlow was professor of Islamic Art at the Royal College of Art in London from 1975 for many years. He also delivered lectures on the application of sacred geometry in architecture at the Lindisfarne Association in New York City and then Crestone, Colorado, in the United States from 1978. In Crestone, he contributed to a number of summer schools for Lindisfarne and taught alongside innovative thinkers from both the arts and sciences, including social philosopher and cultural critic, William Irwin Thompson (founder of the Lindisfarne Association), mythographer and symbolist Robert Lawlor, poet and environmental activist Wendell Berry, biologist John Todd, and environmentalist James Lovelock.

Critchlow founded the Visual Islamic and Traditional Arts (VITA) department in 1984, which moved in 1992–93 from the Royal College of Art to The Prince's Institute of Architecture, where he was director of research. The institute later evolved into The Prince's Foundation, within which Prince's School of Traditional Arts (PSTA) is housed. He was professor emeritus at PSTA and served as director of research. He also taught at The Prince's Foundation for the Built Environment.

In 1983, Critchlow was asked by Indian philosopher and author Jiddu Krishnamurti to design the Krishnamurti Study Centre in Hampshire, UK, which was completed in 1986. His other architectural works include, the Lindisfarne Chapel in Crestone, Colorado, in the United States with a special design for the vaulting of the dome, and a hospital, the Sri Sathya Sai Institute of Higher Medical Sciences in Puttaparthi, India. Isaac Tigrett, who had founded the Hard Rock Cafe enterprise, secured Critchlow's expertise to design the hospital in Puttuparthi. His use of sacred geometry played a major role in these architectural designs and projects.

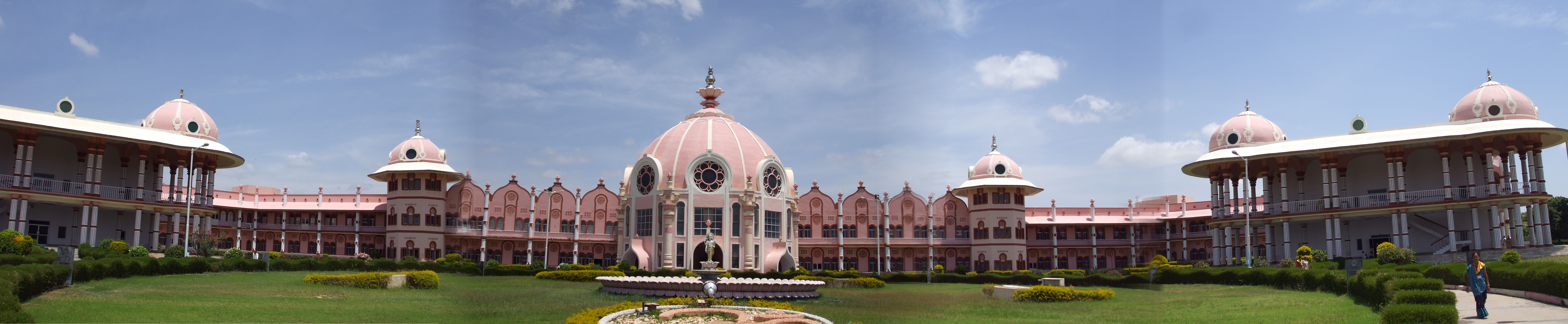
Sri Sathya Sai Super Specialty Hospital, Puttaparthi, A.P., India. Designed by Critchlow

Critchlow made an important contribution to the re-construction of the Minbar of Saladin in the al-Aqsa Mosque, Jerusalem. The minbar was destroyed by fire in 1969 following an arson attack by an evangelical Christian. King Hussein of Jordan launched a 30-year search, including international competitions, to find a sufficiently qualified person to re-design the intricate patterns of the minbar. The competition was finally won by Minwer Al-Mehaid who was inspired to make his submission after spending a year studying Critchlow's work:

Seemingly, the ancient knowledge of how to map the structure geometrically had been lost. Until, that is, Minwer al-Meheid, an engineer from Jordan, walked into a bookshop in Damascus and fell upon a work that contained the answers. It was Islamic Patterns, a pioneering and seminal study of the geometry underpinning Islamic art, by Keith Critchlow.

The story of the re-construction of the Minbar of Saladin is told in a documentary film Stairway to Heaven.

Critchlow was president of the Temenos Academy, a co-founder of Research into Lost Knowledge RILKO and founder of Kairos, an educational charity which investigates, studies, and promotes traditional values in art and science. He was the director of studies at Kairos.

== Family ==
Critchlow was married to Gail Susan Critchlow for 62 years. They had four children.

== Selected works ==
=== Books ===
- Order in Space A Design Source Book, Thames & Hudson, 1969
- Into the Hidden Environment: The Oceans, illustrations by David Nockels, 1973 (Viking Studio)
- Chartres Labyrinth, A Model of the Universe and the Journey of the Soul, 1975, reprinted 2002
- Islamic Patterns, Thames & Hudson, 1976
- Earth Mysteries: A Study in Patterns, 1978
- Time Stands Still: New Light on Megalithic Science, 1979
- Soul As Sphere and Androgyne, 1980
- Research: Principles, Policy and Practice, London : Prince of Wales's Institute of Architecture, 1993
- The Whole Question of Health: Enquiry into Architectural First Principles in the Designing of Health Care Buildings, Keith Critchlow and Jon Allen, London: The Prince of Wales's Institute of Architecture
- Islamic Art and Architecture: System of Geometric Design, Issam El-Said (author), Tarek El-Bouri (editor), Keith Critchlow (editor), Garnet Publishing Ltd, 1999
- The Hidden Geometry of Flowers: Living Rhythms Form and Number, Floris Books, 2011
- The Golden Meaning: An Introduction, London: Kairos Publications, 2014
- The Knap of Howar and The Origins of Geometry, A collaboration between Nicholas Cope (www.ncope.co.uk) and Keith Critchlow, London: Kairos Publications, 2016

=== Chapters ===
- "The Platonic Tradition on the Nature of Proportion", in Bamford, Christopher, Homage to Pythagoras: Rediscovering Sacred Science, 1994.
- "What is Sacred Architecture?", in Bamford, Christopher, Homage to Pythagoras: Rediscovering Sacred Science, 1994.
- "Twelve Criteria for Sacred Architecture", in Bamford, Christopher, Homage to Pythagoras: Rediscovering Sacred Science, 1994.

=== Film ===
- Reflection. A film by Keith Critchlow and Lawrence Moore. Music by Mike Oldfield & Alan Hacker. A Vortex Production. Arts Council of Great Britain 1977. (References taken from the credits appearing at the end of the film).

=== Contributions ===
- Allen, Jon; (Foreword by Keith Critchlow). Drawing Geometry: A Primer of Basic Forms for Artists, Designers and Architects, Floris Books (30 October 2007). ISBN 978-0863156083
- Bass, Steve; (Foreword by Keith Critchlow). 'Beauty Memory Unity', Lindisfarne Books, 2019. ISBN 978-1-58420-967-6 paperback; ebook 978-1-58420-968-3.

== See also ==
- Islamic geometric patterns
- Temenos Academy Review
