= Gabriel Crouch =

British musician

Gabriel Crouch is a British baritone, choral conductor, and record producer.

== Early life ==
Gabriel Crouch was born on 19 September 1973. Musically inclined since the age of eight, he joined the choir of Westminster Abbey. He became the Head Chorister of that choir and even had a solo at the wedding of Prince Andrew and Sarah Ferguson. He attended the University of Cambridge where he studied Geography.

== Career ==
He held the second baritone position in the King's Singers for eight years, from 1996 to 2004, including a Grammy nomination for Best Classical Crossover Album in 2001. He has also performed and recorded with Polyphony, Tenebrae, and The Cambridge Singers among others. Formerly the director of the DePauw University Choral Ensembles, he currently is a professor at Princeton University and directs the Princeton Glee Club and Chamber Choir and the early music ensemble Gallicantus. He has recorded and produced numerous records for many major labels, most notably BMI and Hyperion. In January 2008, the Gabrieli Choir's CD The Road to Paradise, which Crouch produced, was nominated for the title of ‘Best Choral Recording’ in the BBC Music Awards. In February 2019, Crouch appeared as a guest conductor for the PMEA District 7 Choir, conducting a choir of over 200 students from 66 different schools in Central Pennsylvania. In June 2025, Chamber Choir Ireland announced the appointment of Gabriel Crouch as its Artistic Director and Principal Conductor, commencing in January 2026.
