= The King's Singers =

British a cappella vocal ensemble

- Choir
- Origin: Cambridge, England
- Founded: 1968
- Genre: Classical, pop, a capella
- Members: Peter Hicks; Edward Button; Julian Gregory; Joseph Edwards; Nick Ashby; Piers Connor Kennedy
- Website: kingssingers.com

The King's Singers are a British a cappella vocal ensemble founded in 1968. They are named after King's College in Cambridge, England, where the group was formed by six choral scholars. In the United Kingdom, their popularity peaked in the 1970s and early 1980s. Thereafter they began to reach a wider American audience, appearing frequently on The Tonight Show Starring Johnny Carson in the United States. In 1987, they were prominently featured as guests on the Emmy Award-winning ABC television special Julie Andrews: The Sound of Christmas.

Today the ensemble travels worldwide for its performances, appearing in around 125 concerts each year, mostly in Europe, the US and East Asia, having recently added the People's Republic of China to their list of touring territories. In recent years the group has had several UK appearances at the Royal Albert Hall Proms and concerts as part of the Three Choirs Festival and the City of London Festival. The King's Singers consist of two countertenors, a tenor, a bass and two baritones. Their latest albums include "Head Space: Candlelight," released in January 2026, and "The King's Singers: Live at Christmas," released in October 2026.

== History ==
The group has always consisted of six singers in total, with their membership changing over the years. None of the original members remain. The first stable incarnation of the group, from late 1969 until 1978, comprised:

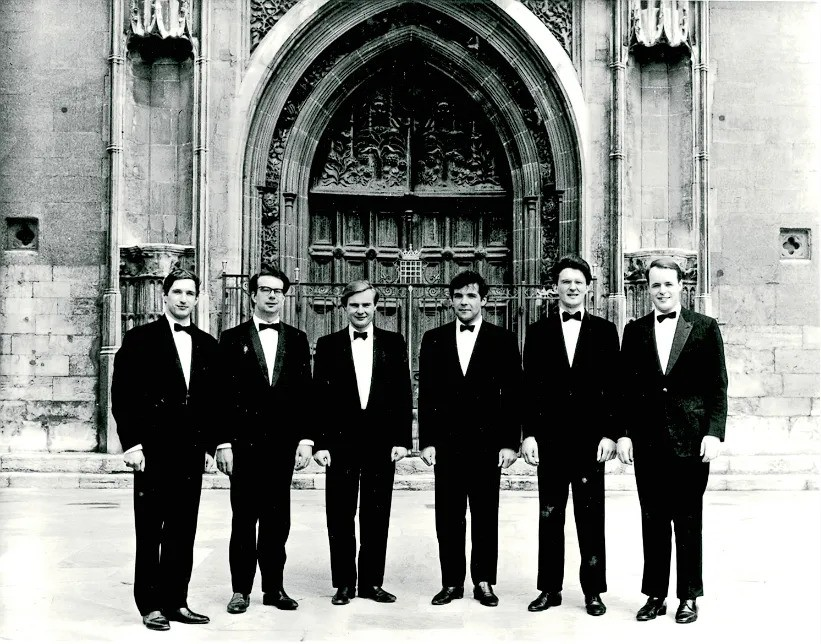
The original King's Singers

- Nigel Perrin (countertenor 1)
- Alastair Hume (countertenor 2)
- Alastair Thompson (tenor)
- Anthony Holt (baritone 1) (actually from Christ Church, Oxford, rather than King's)
- Simon Carrington (baritone 2)
- Brian Kay (bass)

The current ensemble is composed of (starting year in parentheses):

- Peter Hicks (countertenor 1) – (2026)
- Edward Button (countertenor 2) – (2019)
- Julian Gregory (tenor) – (2014)
- Joseph Edwards (baritone 1) – (2026)
- Nick Ashby (baritone 2) – (2019)
- Piers Connor Kennedy (bass) – (2025)

Former members of the King's Singers also include Jeremy Jackman, Bob Chilcott, Nigel Short, Bill Ives, Bruce Russell, Colin Mason, Gabriel Crouch, Stephen Connolly, Robin Tyson, Philip Lawson, Paul Phoenix, David Hurley, Christopher Gabbitas and Timothy Wayne-Wright. There have been 26 members of the King's Singers since the original stable group was established in late 1969, for whom the average length of tenure is around 12 years.

Around the year 2000, the King's Singers briefly called themselves king'singers (with a lower case k and a single s), as can be seen on the cover of Fire-Water and several song sheets. This name change did not last long.

=== Early years ===
Prior to the establishment of the original stable male-only group cited above, several of the parts were taken by other singers, including three females. The four founding members, who first sang together within a six-man group in 1965, were Alastair Hume, Alastair Thompson, Simon Carrington and Brian Kay. From 1965 until 1968, the first countertenor was Martin Lane and the first baritone was Richard Salter. It was this group of six singers who gave the first concert under the name of the King's Singers on 1 May 1968 at the Queen Elizabeth Hall, London, with the Academy of St Martin-in-the-Fields, Simon Preston (organ) and Barry Tuckwell (horn). Later in 1968, Martin Lane developed a brain tumour and had to withdraw from the group; Felicity Palmer stood in during 1969 until Nigel Perrin graduated that summer. Then, in 1969, Richard Salter was awarded a Richard Tauber Scholarship and left for Vienna; Nigel Beavan filled the gap until Anthony Holt became available towards the end of the year. Other singers who served as short-term group members were Eleanor Capp, Caryl Newnham and, on one occasion, James Bowman, all of whom took the first countertenor (soprano) role in 1969 when Felicity Palmer was unavailable. For a brief time after he joined the King's Singers, Nigel Perrin also belonged to the Scholars; when double-booked, his King's Singers' duties were fulfilled by Richard Baker (note: not the familiar BBC broadcaster). Neil Jenkins sang tenor in the early pre-King's Singers group's first summer singing tour in 1965, and Peter Hall was another tenor used by the fledgling pre-King's Singers group.

=== Madrigal History Tour ===
In 1984, the members of the King's Singers (who at the time included three founding members: Alastair Hume, Anthony Holt, and Simon Carrington) presented, narrated and sang in Madrigal History Tour, a six-part BBC television documentary series about the history of the madrigal in Western Europe. (The name was a play on the Beatles album Magical Mystery Tour.) The series also featured the early music ensemble the Consort of Musicke, playing together with and separately from the King's Singers. The series was accompanied by an album, also called Madrigal History Tour.

=== 20th anniversary ===
The King's Singers' 20th anniversary concert in 1988, at the Barbican, featured a surprise reunion, in which all King's Singers to date reunited on stage, introduced individually (with membership dates, counting from 1968) by Prunella Scales.

=== 40th anniversary ===
Fortieth anniversary celebration concerts included two "best of" concerts at Cadogan Hall, London, on 30 April 2008, and a performance the following day in the chapel of King's College Cambridge, as well as concerts in Paris, Rome, Berlin, New York and Tokyo.

=== 50th anniversary ===
The King's Singers 50th anniversary was celebrated in 2018 with a special concert at Carnegie Hall, and the release of a new album, Gold.

=== PCC concert cancellation ===
In February 2023, Pensacola Christian College cancelled the group's concert with two hours notice. The reasons seem to have been concerns around the sexuality of a member of the group, leading to many believing it was a homophobic related cancellation.

== Influences ==
The group cites its influences the Hi-Lo's vocal jazz group, the Comedian Harmonists, the Mastersingers and (perhaps most importantly) the style of singing instilled into them by Sir David Willcocks, their director of music at King's College, Cambridge. It was this serene and precise sound, with vibrato used only as a colour rather than a default setting, that was expanded by the early King's Singers to be used on all genres of music, from Renaissance church repertoire such as they had performed as part of the daily chapel services at the university, to pop, jazz, folk and spiritual arrangements that were soon added to their concert programmes.

The group has also inspired musicians in other countries to create similar ensembles, such as Affabre Concinui in Poland.

== Repertoire ==
The King's Singers took hold of the idea that concerts need not contain merely one form of music; audiences could be educated as well as entertained. For those who came expecting pop music there would be classical music as well, and vice versa. This started out of necessity; for their first few concerts the group simply had to perform everything they knew in order to fill a concert programme, and this included religious music from their chapel library, along with folksongs and other "lollipops".

Over the years their library has expanded so that it now includes some 2,000 works of all styles. The group is best known for its a cappella performances which have as a foundation a strong bass/baritone blend on which the other voices sit, a principle known as the "Pyramid of Sound". They say the 'added' baritone creates more width and depth to their sound. The two baritones and bass allow the top three parts to sit on top of the bed of sound created for them and, given that higher-pitched voices are heard more easily, the effect to the audience is one of complete balance in the overall chordal sound, despite being 'outnumbered' by their lower-pitched colleagues. In addition, the King's Singers have frequently performed with instruments, both in recordings and in concert. One of their most famous songs is "You Are The New Day". They have appeared in many venues, including the famous City Varieties Theatre Leeds, with many appearances on BBC TV's long running Music Hall variety programme, The Good Old Days. They have also appeared on TV in concert with Hinge and Bracket.

== Concert structure ==
Most of their a cappella concerts are divided into five distinct groups of pieces. The first four vary widely (madrigals, folk songs, recently commissioned pieces, etc.) but are generally taken from the serious side of the group's repertoire, but the last group of the concert is typically a "close harmony" set. Often it consists of lighter fare, including music of The Beatles, Billy Joel, Queen, George Gershwin, Harold Arlen or Irving Berlin, many of which have been arranged for the group by composers such as Richard Rodney Bennett, Jeremy Lubbock, Bob Chilcott, Philip Lawson and John Rutter. Sometimes the final set (in a concert of religious music) will be a spiritual harmony set – entitled "Songs of Faith and Hope". This set could be composed of American Spirituals, arranged by contemporary composers, including former group members Philip Lawson and Bob Chilcott. Pieces in this set could include "Simple Gifts", "Deep River", "Down to the River to Pray", and "Stand Still Jordan" as well as more spiritual pop songs such as "Some Folks Lives Roll Easy" by Paul Simon.

As well as the five-group programme The King's Singers perform "concept programmes" which have a set theme running throughout. These could be simply a 60-minute first-half sequence, often performed in European cathedral concerts, with a Mass or Requiem setting providing the backbone, interspersed with other shorter works, or a more fundamental concept which infuses every piece performed. Examples of this latter art include "Sacred Bridges", a programme of Jewish, Islamic and Christian settings of Psalms, performed with Vladimir Ivanoff and his ensemble "Saraband". The group have also created concert programmes relating to recent CD recordings, including "Landscape and Time" and "Treason and Dischord", the latter a programme commemorating the 400th anniversary of the Gunpowder Plot and including a script read in live performances by actors Joss Ackland and Bill Wallis. The group works closely with concert promoters and local agents to determine the best possible programme for each concert, whether for church, concert hall, open-air venue or private house.

== Modern repertoire ==
The King's Singers are also known for frequently commissioning works from contemporary composers. Starting with "Timepiece", commissioned by the Camden Festival in 1972 from composer Paul Patterson (and still regularly performed today), they have continued by commissioning pieces from (amongst others) Sally Beamish, David Bowie, Bob Chilcott, Sir Peter Maxwell Davies, Howard Goodall, Daron Hagen, Jackson Hill, Graham Lack, Libby Larsen, György Ligeti, John McCabe, Ivan Moody, Jocelyn Pook, Geoffrey Poole, Francis Pott, Ned Rorem, Joby Talbot, Sir John Tavener and Malcolm Williamson. In 2008 they performed a piece commissioned jointly for them and the National Youth Choirs of Great Britain written by Eric Whitacre.

== Awards ==
In February 2009, the King's Singers' CD, Simple Gifts, won a Grammy Award for Best Classical Crossover Album. In February 2012, they won Best Choral Performance at the 54th Grammy Awards along with Eric Whitacre for the album Light and Gold, on which they performed "The Stolen Child", written for the group by Whitacre. Their DVD, "Live at the BBC Proms", won a MIDEM Award at the annual ceremony in Cannes in 2010 for Best DVD Performance. In 2013 the group was inducted into the Gramophone Hall of Fame.

== Activities of former members ==
Many former members of the King's Singers have remained active in the world of choral music.

- Simon Carrington is director emeritus of the Yale Schola Cantorum at the Yale Institute for Sacred Music and now directs the Simon Carrington Singers based in Kansas City, Missouri.
- Bob Chilcott is now a composer, conductor of the BBC Singers and workshop leader.
- Stephen Connolly runs his residential International A Cappella School (IAS) every summer in the UK and also travels the world delivering choral workshops and masterclasses.
- Gabriel Crouch is now the director of choral ensembles at Princeton University
- Anthony Holt was on the music faculty at St. Olaf College in Northfield, Minnesota as a voice instructor. He died on 12 January 2024, at the age of 82.
- Bill Ives, is a composer and arranger, and for 18 years was fellow and tutor in music at Magdalen College, Oxford, where he directed the choir.
- Brian Kay, became well-known as a radio and TV broadcaster.
- Philip Lawson is active as a composer, arranger, workshop leader, and conductor. Since 2016 he has been musical director of the Romsey Singers.
- Nigel Perrin (1947–2024) founded the award-winning chamber choir Bath Camerata in 1986, and conducted it for 29 years. He was musical director of the Bath Bach Choir from 1990 until 2022, and of Exeter Festival Chorus from 1999 to 2021. He also directed the Bath Spa University Chamber Choir and the Wells Cathedral School Chamber Choir, where he taught singing for 24 years. He was an inspirational director of workshops, masterclasses, special projects and summer schools all over the world. As well as covering a vast array of classic and contemporary choral repertoire, he directed many 'lighter side' courses and weekends and formed a group known as Voces del Camino, leading it on four 'pilgrimage' tours to Spain, including to Santiago de Compostela and other cathedrals along the Camino de Santiago.
- Paul Phoenix founded his own consultancy, PurpleVocals, and in September 2019 opened the Paul Phoenix Academy, his own private music school in Hong Kong. As executive director he directs instrumental and composition tuition.
- Bruce Russell is now vicar of St Francis' Church, Langley, in Berkshire.
- Nigel Short founded a professional choir, Tenebrae, on leaving the group in 2001.
- Robin Tyson runs an artist management company Podium Music.

== Educational activities ==
In addition to recording and performing, the King's Singers have a commitment to education, often participating in master classes and workshops. Every two years they hold a residency at the Schleswig-Holstein Music Festival in Lübeck, Germany, at which up to 12 a cappella groups from all over the world are taught over a period of four days, culminating in a public performance. The group also leads around a dozen additional one-off masterclasses throughout the year, normally in conjunction with concert performances and often as part of their twice-yearly US tours. During its time, the King's Singers have taught many groups that have now become known in their own right, such as Club for Five, The Real Group, Rajaton, Singer Pur and Calmus Ensemble.

Several of the King's Singers also arranged pieces, both for the group and pieces to publish in their line of music. Recently, Philip Lawson and Bob Chilcott have been the most prolific composers for the group.

The group established The King's Singers Summer School in 2013 taking place on campus at Royal Holloway, University of London. The Summer School took place for a second time in 2015 and saw composer and conductor Eric Whitacre and Eton Choirbook expert Dr. Stephen Darlington as special guests. In 2017, the Summer School participants performed an Evensong at the St George's Chapel, under the direction of Christopher Robinson. The first US Summer School took place between 13 and 19 June 2017 at DePauw University, Indiana followed by the third School at Royal Holloway on 17–22 July 2017. The King's Singers were joined by guest clinician and former King's Singers Bob Chilcott.

== Personnel ==
=== Members ===
Current members

- Peter Hicks - 1st Countertenor (2026-present)
- Edward Button – 2nd Countertenor (2019–present)
- Julian Gregory – Tenor (2014–present)
- Joseph Edwards - 1st Baritone (2026-present)
- Nick Ashby – 2nd Baritone (2019–present)
- Piers Connor Kennedy – Bass (2025–present)

Former members

- Martin Lane – 1st Countertenor (1968–1969)
- Nigel Perrin – 1st Countertenor (1969–1980; died 2024)
- Jeremy Jackman – 1st Countertenor (1980–1990)
- David Hurley – 1st Countertenor (1990–2016)
- Patrick Dunachie – 1st Countertenor (2016–2026)
- Alastair Hume – 2nd Countertenor (1968–1993)
- Nigel Short – 2nd Countertenor (1994–2000)
- Robin Tyson – 2nd Countertenor (2001–2009)
- Timothy Wayne-Wright – 2nd Countertenor (2009–2018)
- Alastair Thompson – Tenor (1968–1978)
- Bill Ives – Tenor (1978–1985)
- Bob Chilcott – Tenor (1985–1997)
- Paul Phoenix – Tenor (1997–2014)
- Richard Salter – 1st Baritone (1968; died 2009)
- Nigel Beaven – 1st Baritone (1968–1969)
- Anthony Holt – 1st Baritone (1969–1987; died 2024)
- Bruce Russell – 1st Baritone (1988–1996)
- Philip Lawson – 2nd Baritone (1994–1996); 1st Baritone (1996–2012)
- Christopher Bruerton – 1st Baritone (2012–2026)
- Simon Carrington – 2nd Baritone (1968–1993)
- Gabriel Crouch – 2nd Baritone (1996–2004)
- Christopher Gabbitas – 2nd Baritone (2004–2018)
- Brian Kay – Bass (1968–1982)
- Colin Mason – Bass (1982–1987)
- Stephen Connolly – Bass (1988–2010)
- Jonathan Howard – Bass (2010–2024)

=== Lineups ===
1968	1968–1969	1969–1978	1978–1980
Martin Lane – 1st Countertenor; Alastair Hume – 2nd Countertenor; Alastair Thompson – Tenor; Richard Salter – 1st Baritone; Simon Carrington – 2nd Baritone; Brian Kay – Bass	Martin Lane – 1st Countertenor; Alastair Hume – 2nd Countertenor; Alastair Thompson – Tenor; Nigel Beaven – 1st Baritone; Simon Carrington – 2nd Baritone; Brian Kay – Bass	Nigel Perrin – 1st Countertenor; Alastair Hume – 2nd Countertenor; Alastair Thompson – Tenor; Anthony Holt – 1st Baritone; Simon Carrington – 2nd Baritone; Brian Kay – Bass	Nigel Perrin – 1st Countertenor; Alastair Hume – 2nd Countertenor; Bill Ives – Tenor; Anthony Holt – 1st Baritone; Simon Carrington – 2nd Baritone; Brian Kay – Bass
1980–1982	1982–1985	1985–1987	1988–1990
Jeremy Jackman – 1st Countertenor; Alastair Hume – 2nd Countertenor; Bill Ives – Tenor; Anthony Holt – 1st Baritone; Simon Carrington – 2nd Baritone; Brian Kay – Bass	Jeremy Jackman – 1st Countertenor; Alastair Hume – 2nd Countertenor; Bill Ives – Tenor; Anthony Holt – 1st Baritone; Simon Carrington – 2nd Baritone; Colin Mason – Bass	Jeremy Jackman – 1st Countertenor; Alastair Hume – 2nd Countertenor; Bob Chilcott – Tenor; Anthony Holt – 1st Baritone; Simon Carrington – 2nd Baritone; Colin Mason – Bass	Jeremy Jackman – 1st Countertenor; Alastair Hume – 2nd Countertenor; Bob Chilcott – Tenor; Bruce Russell – 1st Baritone; Simon Carrington – 2nd Baritone; Stephen Connolly – Bass
1990–1993	1994–1996	1996–1997	1997–2000
David Hurley – 1st Countertenor; Alastair Hume – 2nd Countertenor; Bob Chilcott – Tenor; Bruce Russell – 1st Baritone; Simon Carrington – 2nd Baritone; Stephen Connolly – Bass	David Hurley – 1st Countertenor; Nigel Short – 2nd Countertenor; Bob Chilcott – Tenor; Bruce Russell – 1st Baritone; Philip Lawson – 2nd Baritone; Stephen Connolly – Bass	David Hurley – 1st Countertenor; Nigel Short – 2nd Countertenor; Bob Chilcott – Tenor; Philip Lawson – 1st Baritone; Gabriel Crouch – 2nd Baritone; Stephen Connolly – Bass	David Hurley – 1st Countertenor; Nigel Short – 2nd Countertenor; Paul Phoenix – Tenor; Philip Lawson – 1st Baritone; Gabriel Crouch – 2nd Baritone; Stephen Connolly – Bass
2001–2004	2004–2009	2009–2010	2010–2012
David Hurley – 1st Countertenor; Robin Tyson – 2nd Countertenor; Paul Phoenix – Tenor; Philip Lawson – 1st Baritone; Gabriel Crouch – 2nd Baritone; Stephen Connolly – Bass	David Hurley – 1st Countertenor; Robin Tyson – 2nd Countertenor; Paul Phoenix – Tenor; Philip Lawson – 1st Baritone; Christopher Gabbitas – 2nd Baritone; Stephen Connolly – Bass	David Hurley – 1st Countertenor; Timothy Wayne-Wright – 2nd Countertenor; Paul Phoenix – Tenor; Philip Lawson – 1st Baritone; Christopher Gabbitas – 2nd Baritone; Stephen Connolly – Bass	David Hurley – 1st Countertenor; Timothy Wayne-Wright – 2nd Countertenor; Paul Phoenix – Tenor; Philip Lawson – 1st Baritone; Christopher Gabbitas – 2nd Baritone; Jonathan Howard – Bass
2012–2014	2014–2016	2016–2018	2019–2024
David Hurley – 1st Countertenor; Timothy Wayne-Wright – 2nd Countertenor; Paul Phoenix – Tenor; Christopher Bruerton – 1st Baritone; Christopher Gabbitas – 2nd Baritone; Jonathan Howard – Bass	David Hurley – 1st Countertenor; Timothy Wayne-Wright – 2nd Countertenor; Julian Gregory – Tenor; Christopher Bruerton – 1st Baritone; Christopher Gabbitas – 2nd Baritone; Jonathan Howard – Bass	Patrick Dunachie – 1st Countertenor; Timothy Wayne-Wright – 2nd Countertenor; Julian Gregory – Tenor; Christopher Bruerton – 1st Baritone; Christopher Gabbitas – 2nd Baritone; Jonathan Howard – Bass	Patrick Dunachie – 1st Countertenor; Edward Button – 2nd Countertenor; Julian Gregory – Tenor; Christopher Bruerton – 1st Baritone; Nick Ashby – 2nd Baritone; Jonathan Howard – Bass
2025–2026	2026-present
Patrick Dunachie – 1st Countertenor; Edward Button – 2nd Countertenor; Julian Gregory – Tenor; Christopher Bruerton – 1st Baritone; Nick Ashby – 2nd Baritone; Piers Connor Kennedy – Bass	Peter Hicks – 1st Countertenor; Edward Button – 2nd Countertenor; Julian Gregory – Tenor; Joseph Edwards – 1st Baritone; Nick Ashby – 2nd Baritone; Piers Connor Kennedy – Bass

==== Lineup ====
Period	1st Countertenor	2nd Countertenor	Tenor	1st Baritone	2nd Baritone	Bass
1968	Martin Lane	Alastair Hume	Alastair Thompson	Richard Salter	Simon Carrington	Brian Kay
1968–1969	Martin Lane	Alastair Hume	Alastair Thompson	Nigel Beaven	Simon Carrington	Brian Kay
1969–1978	Nigel Perrin	Alastair Hume	Alastair Thompson	Anthony Holt	Simon Carrington	Brian Kay
1978–1980	Nigel Perrin	Alastair Hume	Bill Ives	Anthony Holt	Simon Carrington	Brian Kay
1980–1982	Jeremy Jackman	Alastair Hume	Bill Ives	Anthony Holt	Simon Carrington	Brian Kay
1982–1985	Jeremy Jackman	Alastair Hume	Bill Ives	Anthony Holt	Simon Carrington	Colin Mason
1985–1987	Jeremy Jackman	Alastair Hume	Bob Chilcott	Anthony Holt	Simon Carrington	Colin Mason
1988–1990	Jeremy Jackman	Alastair Hume	Bob Chilcott	Bruce Russell	Simon Carrington	Stephen Connolly
1990–1993	David Hurley	Alastair Hume	Bob Chilcott	Bruce Russell	Simon Carrington	Stephen Connolly
1994–1996	David Hurley	Nigel Short	Bob Chilcott	Bruce Russell	Philip Lawson	Stephen Connolly
1996–1997	David Hurley	Nigel Short	Bob Chilcott	Philip Lawson	Gabriel Crouch	Stephen Connolly
1997–2000	David Hurley	Nigel Short	Paul Phoenix	Philip Lawson	Gabriel Crouch	Stephen Connolly
2001–2004	David Hurley	Robin Tyson	Paul Phoenix	Philip Lawson	Gabriel Crouch	Stephen Connolly
2004–2009	David Hurley	Robin Tyson	Paul Phoenix	Philip Lawson	Christopher Gabbitas	Stephen Connolly
2009–2010	David Hurley	Timothy Wayne-Wright	Paul Phoenix	Philip Lawson	Christopher Gabbitas	Stephen Connolly
2010–2012	David Hurley	Timothy Wayne-Wright	Paul Phoenix	Philip Lawson	Christopher Gabbitas	Jonathan Howard
2012–2014	David Hurley	Timothy Wayne-Wright	Paul Phoenix	Christopher Bruerton	Christopher Gabbitas	Jonathan Howard
2014–2016	David Hurley	Timothy Wayne-Wright	Julian Gregory	Christopher Bruerton	Christopher Gabbitas	Jonathan Howard
2016–2018	Patrick Dunachie	Timothy Wayne-Wright	Julian Gregory	Christopher Bruerton	Christopher Gabbitas	Jonathan Howard
2019–2024	Patrick Dunachie	Edward Button	Julian Gregory	Christopher Bruerton	Nick Ashby	Jonathan Howard
2025–2026	Patrick Dunachie	Edward Button	Julian Gregory	Christopher Bruerton	Nick Ashby	Piers Connor Kennedy
2026-present	Peter Hicks	Edward Button	Julian Gregory	Joseph Edwards	Nick Ashby	Piers Connor Kennedy

== Discography ==
In 2003, the group signed with Signum Records, with whom they have now released eighteen recordings, including an experimental recording of Thomas Tallis' 40-part "Spem in Alium", using modern studio multi-tracking techniques to turn their six voices into 40, the results of which can be heard on a Signum CD and Iambic Productions DVD, which includes a documentary on the making of the CD.

The group's most successful recent CD is the 2008 Simple Gifts, a selection of 16 pop ballads, spirituals, and folk songs. It was their first full-length studio CD since the 1990s. The arrangements on the album are by former first baritone Philip Lawson, Peter Knight and former tenor Bob Chilcott, and the album was recorded at the home of Francis Rossi, of Status Quo, and engineered by Gregg Jackman, the brother of former King's Singers countertenor Jeremy Jackman. In February 2009 Simple Gifts won a Grammy Award for Best Classical Crossover Album. An EP recording, From the Heart, was released in 2010.

In December 2007, the King's Singers recorded a Christmas concert, Rejoice and Be Merry! with The Mormon Tabernacle Choir and Orchestra at Temple Square, that was released on CD on 30 September 2008; it also was released on DVD 21 October 2008. The CD featured both a cappella and accompanied songs by the King's Singers and The Mormon Tabernacle Choir. Six tracks feature the King's Singers alone, with another five tracks featuring the combined King's Singer's and Mormon Tabernacle Choir, the remaining eight tracks feature The Mormon Tabernacle Choir. The recorded concert was also broadcast on US PBS stations in December 2008. In 2011, the group released High Flight with The Concordia Choir, an album of music by three of the most popular 21st century choral composers, Eric Whitacre, Morten Lauridsen and former tenor in the group Bob Chilcott.

In October 2013, The King's Singers released Great American Songbook, an album dedicated to American Standards from the 1920s to the 1960s, to critical acclaim. The sound on this new album marks a departure from the more acoustic albums of the past decade, using extensive post-production techniques and multi-tracking to create a more modern a cappella sound, but retaining the essence of The King's Singers' blend and balance.

King's Singers albums
Disc name	Release year	Instrumentation / Notes	# of a cappella tracks	# of tracks
1605: Treason and Dischord	2005	Concordia Viol Consort and Sarah Baldock (organ)	7	15
À la Française	1987	Scottish Chamber Orchestra, conducted by Carl Davis; Howard Shelley and Hilary Macnamara, pianos.	5	21
All at Once Well Met	1987	Lute and Tabor	29	35
America	1989, 2006	English Chamber Orchestra	0	10
Annie Laurie: Folk songs of the British isles	1991	Manuel Barrueco, guitar; Nancy Hadden, renaissance flute and piccolo	7	18
Atlantic Bridge	1979	Banjo, steel guitar, mouth harmonica, winds, harp, bass, pitched percussion, drums.	10	16
1605: Treason and Dischord	2005	Concordia Viol Consort and Sarah Baldock (organ)	7	15
The Beatles Connection	1986		19	19
By Appointment (aka Encore)	1971	The Gordon Langford Trio	5	13
Capella (compilation)	2003			41
Captain Noah and His Floating Zoo; Holy Moses	1972, 2005	Drums: Alf Bigden, keyboard: Steve Gray, bass: Brian Odges (Holy Moses)	0	18
Chanson d'amour	1993		11	21
Christmas	2003	String Quartet and Drums	23	25
Circle of Life	1997	Metropole Orkest	3	12
Colouring Book	2005			18
Concert Collection	1976		22	22
Contemporary Collection	1975	Double bass		5
Courtly Pleasures	1973	Early Music Consort of London, David Munrow		22
De Janequin aux Beatles (compilation)	1999	Various		55
Deck the Hall – Songs for Christmas	1973, 1991		15	15
English & Italian Madrigals	1974, 1989	(reissue of King's Singers Madrigal Collection)	21	21
English Renaissance	1995		20	20
Fire~Water	2000	Andrew Lawrence-King, The Harp Consort		17
A French Collection	1973	Early Music Consort of London, David Munrow	10	16
Gesualdo: Tenebrae Responses for Maundy Thursday	2004		14	14
Get Happy!	1991	George Shearing (piano), Neil Swainson (double bass), John Harle (saxophone)	3	17
The Golden Age – Siglo de Oro	2008	Keith McGowan		10
Good Vibrations	1993		13	13
Great American Songbook	2013		17	17
Here's a Howdy Do!	1993	Sound Effects, Organ, Piano, Double Bass, Drums	11	15
High Flight	2011	The Concordia Choir	13	14
In Memoriam Josquin Desprez (compilation)	2012		13	13
Joy to the World	2011		18	18
Kids' Stuff	1986, 2000	Judi Dench, narrator; Andrew Jackman, synthesizers; Susan Milan, flute; Paul Hart, piano and synthesizers; Chris Laurence, double bass; Tristan Fry, drums.		14
Keep on Changing	1975	Instrumental ensemble		12
The King's Singers Believe in Music	1981	Piano, guitars, bass, drums	5	14
The King's Singers Madrigal Collection	1974		21	21
The King's Singers Original Debut Recording	1971, 1992	The Gordon Langford Trio (reissue of By Appointment)	5	13
The King's Singers sing Flanders & Swann and Noël Coward	1977		15	15
Landscape & Time	2006		11	11
György Ligeti Edition, Vol. 4 (Vocal Works)	1997			
A Little Christmas Music	1989	Kiri Te Kanawa, City of London Sinfonia	7	20
Lollipops	1975		11	11
Madrigal History Tour	1984, 1989	Consort of Musicke	0	34
My Spirit Sang All Day	1988		25	25
Nana's book of songs	1974	Nana Mouskouri, orchestra		10
New Day	1980		9	15
Nightsong	1997	Various	5	15
Out of the Blue	1974	Instrumental ensemble		12
Pater Noster: A Choral Reflection on the Lord's Prayer	2012		25	25
Postcards	2014		22	22
The Quiet Heart – Choral Essays Vol.1	2006		19	19
Reflections – Choral Essays Vol.2	2008		20	20
In This Quiet Moment – Choral Essays Vol.3	2010		18	18
Rejoice and Be Merry!	2008	Mormon Tabernacle Choir and Orchestra at Temple Square	6	11 (19)
Renaissance (Works by Josquin Desprez)	1993		21	21
Romance du Soir	2009		19	19
Royal Rhymes and Rounds	2012		23	23
Sacred Bridges	2005	Sarband	7	12
Sermons and Devotions	2006			15
Simple Gifts	2008		16	16
Sing We and Chant It	1982	Robert Spencer, lute; John Fraser, tabor.	15	21
Six	2005		6	6
Spem in alium	2006	(One interview track)	1	2
Spirit Voices	1997		2	14
Street Songs	1998	Evelyn Glennie (percussion)	7?	18
Swimming Over London	2010		14	14
Swing	1976		7	13
Tempus Fugit	1978		0	12
This is The King's Singers (compilation)	1980		7	18
Thomas Tallis: The Lamentations of Jeremiah; William Byrd: Motets	1977		7	7
A Tribute to the Comedian Harmonists	1985	Emil Gerhardt, Piano	5	16
The Triumphs of Oriana	1999, 2006		25	25
Three Musical Fables	1983	Cambridge Singers and City of London Sinfonia	0	3
Victorian Collection	1980		19	19
Watching the White Wheat	1986	Piccolo, flute, clarinet, string quartet, solo violin, solo cello, harp.	9	16
Gold (3-disc set)	2017		60	60
Such Stuff as Dreams are Made on	2025			

Many King's Singers arrangements have been published, including a number compiled into song books
