= Brian Keeble =

British author and editor

Brian Keeble is a British author and editor. He is the founder of Golgonooza Press and a co-founder of the Temenos and Temenos Academy.

== Biography ==
Keeble is the founder of Golgonooza Press where he worked as editor, designer and publisher from 1974-2004.

He was a co-founder and is a Fellow of the Temenos Academy - whose Patron is Charles, Prince of Wales - which is a teaching organization dedicated to the same central idea that had inspired the earlier Temenos, of which he was a co-founder and editor (1980–1991). Both focus on a devotion to the ‘Arts of the Imagination’ and feature the lectures and works of scholars and teachers committed to Perennial Philosophy.

The Golgonooza Press Archive, covering the years 1962 to 2012, is in the British Library (Add MS 89131).

He wrote a poem to be set to music by John Tavener for choir, organ and temple gong as Mother and Child.

== Bibliography ==
- In Hollow Sleep, (Tragara Press, 1972)
- Art: For Whom and For What?, (Golgonooza Press, 1998)
- Vernon Watkins: Inspiration as Poetry, Poetry as Inspiration,(Temenos Academy, 2002)
- Twenty-four Poems, (Golgonooza Press, 2002)
- Conversing with Paradise, (Golgonooza Press, 2005)
- Shapes of Light, Poems, (Golgonooza Press, 2005)
- Every Man an Artist: Readings in the Traditional Philosophy of Art, (World Wisdom, 2005)
- Kathleen Raine: Poetic Imagination and the Vision of Reality, (Temenos Academy, 2008)
- In His Name and other poems, (Golgonooza Press, 2008)
- God & Work: Aspects of Art and Tradition, (World Wisdom, 2009)
- Cecil Collins:The Artist as Writer and Image Maker, (Golgonooza Press, 2009)
- From a Handful of Dust, Poems, (Golgonooza Press, 2011)
- Far from the Dawn, Poems, (Golgonooza Press, 2014)
- Daily Bread: Art and Work in the Reign of Quantity, (Selected essays), Edited and introduced by Andrew Frisardi, (Angelico Press, 2015)
- Mask After Mask, Poems, (Golgonooza Press, 2018)
- These Bright Shadows: The Poetry of Kathleen Raine, (Angelico Press, 2020)
- Words to the Wind, Poems, (Golgnooza Press, 2021)

Works edited by Brian Keeble

- The Inner Journey of the Poet, and other papers, by Kathleen Raine. (Allen & Unwin, 1982)
- A Holy Tradition of Working. An Anthology of the Writings of Eric Gill, (Golgonooza Press, 1983)
- What is Civilisation? and other Essays, by Ananda K. Coomaraswamy, (Golgonooza Press, 1989)
- Standing on Earth. Selected Essays of Wendell Berry, (Golgonooza Press, 1991)
- Meditations, Poems, Pages from a Sketch Book, by Cecil Collins, (Golgonooza Press, 1997)
- The Music of Silence, a Composer's Testament, by Sir John Tavener, (Faber & Faber, 1999)
- The Vision of the Fool and other Writings, by Cecil Collins, enlarged edition, (Golgonooza Press, 2002)
- Temenos Academy Review 7, Kathleen Raine Memorial Issue, (Temenos Academy, 2004)
- The Underlying Order and other Essays, by Kathleen Raine, (Temenos Academy, 2008)
- That Wondrous Pattern, Essays on Poetry and Poets, by Kathleen Raine. (Counterpoint Press, 2017)
- A Holy Tradition of Working, Passages from the writings of Eric Gill, selected with an Introduction by Brian Keeble, new edition with foreword by Wendell Berry. (Angelico Press, 2021)

== See also ==
- Temenos Academy Review
- Traditionalism
- Kathleen Raine
