= Richard Salter (baritone) =

English baritone

Richard Jeffrey Salter (Hindhead, Surrey, on 12 November 1943 – Karlsruhe, 1 February 2009) was an English baritone, known as a founder member of The King's Singers, serving for the first few months before moving to Austria and Germany to take leading roles in many contemporary operas.

After the King's Singers' first concerts and recording in 1969, Salter was awarded a Richard Tauber Scholarship and moved to Vienna where he successfully established himself as an opera singer. Among his signature roles were Bernd Alois Zimmermann's Requiem for a Young Poet, Schoenberg's Von heute auf morgen, the baritone lead in operas by Manfred Trojahn and Wolfgang Rihm, the main character K. in Aribert Reimann's Das Schloß after Kafka (1996), and Philip Glass' Waiting for the Barbarians (2005).
