= Tenebrae (choir) =

British vocal ensemble

- Choir
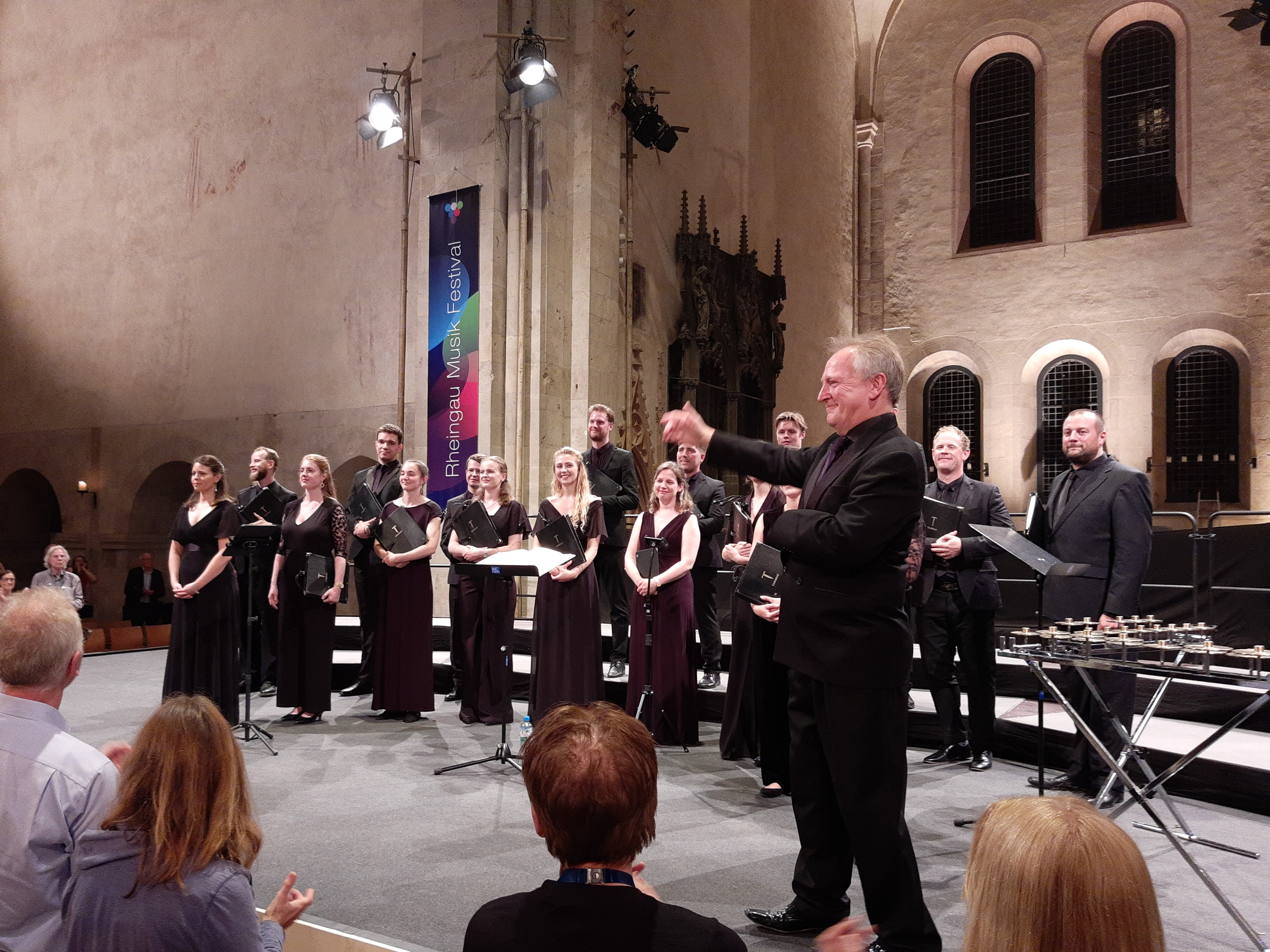
- Tenebrae after a concert of the Rheingau Musik Festival at Eberbach Abbey in 2023
- Origin: London, England
- Founded: 2001
- Chief conductor: Nigel Short
- Awards: Rheingau Musikpreis
- Website: www.tenebrae-choir.com

Tenebrae is a London-based professional vocal ensemble founded in 2001 and directed by former King's Singer Nigel Short. Its repertoire covers works from the 16th to the 21st centuries, able to combine in one long program pieces as diverse as Victoria's Officium Defunctorum, secular and sacred motets for solo voices, and Talbot's 2005 Path of Miracles. The choir has toured internationally and made recordings, including contemporary works commissioned by them. The group was awarded the 2023 Rheingau Musikpreis.

== History ==
Tenebrae was founded in 2001 by Nigel Short, together with Barbara Pollock. It was launched in 2001 with a performance of Nigel Short's own composition, The Dream of Herod, created to demonstrate a theatrical style of performing within religious buildings, involving movement around the performance venue as well as dramatic use of lighting and ambiance. In 2002, they commissioned John Tavener to compose Mother and Child, setting a poem by Brian Keeble for choir, organ and temple gong. They performed the world premiere and made a recording of the same title, including other contemporary sacred music.

In 2006 the group toured with Joby Talbot's Path of Miracles, written on its commission, to churches in Spain on the Camino de Santiago route. They formed an association with the London Symphony Orchestra, making recordings for LSO Live with the conductor Colin Davis. The choir's albums include Allegri: Miserere, an album that includes choral works ranging from Allegri's Miserere to works by Benjamin Britten and John Tavener, released on the Signum Classics label.

When Tenebrae toured New York in 2011, The New York Times wrote: "if the group toured here as often as The Tallis Scholars, it could probably match — perhaps even draw on — that ensemble’s considerable following in New York."

Tenebrae have also ventured into popular genres, performing "So Long, and Thanks for all the Fish" in the film version of The Hitchhiker's Guide to the Galaxy. Tenebrae features also on the soundtrack of the film Children of Men.

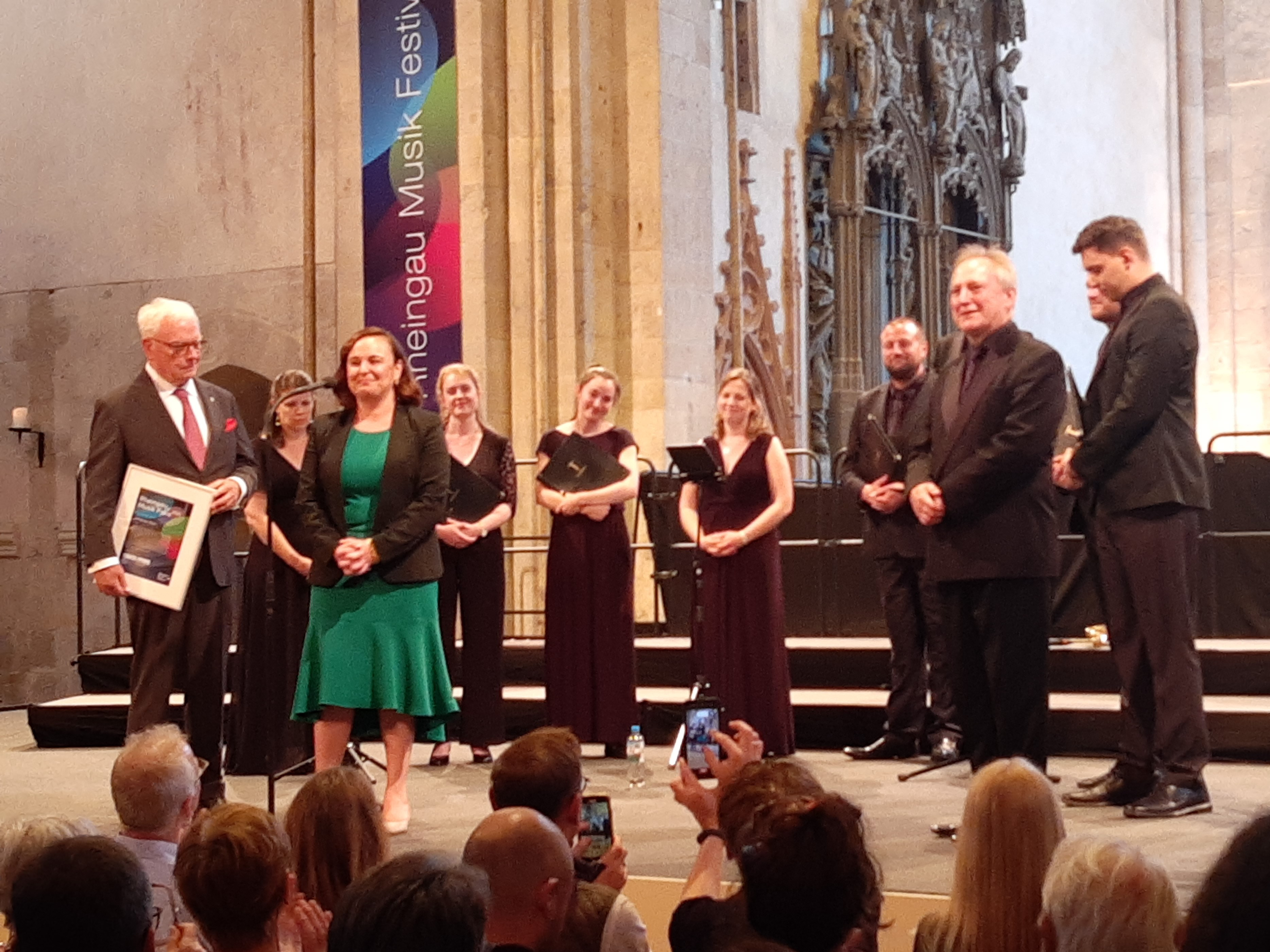
Rheingau Musik Preis awarded by Michael Herrmann and Ayse Asar, 22 July 2023

In 2019 Tenebrae first appeared at the Rheingau Musik Festival, performing Path of Miracles. They returned in following seasons, and received the Rheingau Musik Preis of 2023 during a performance called The Immersive Night of Choral Music; it offered Victoria's Officium Defunctorum, secular and sacred motets sung by the Tenebrae Consort of five to eight solo voices, and ending with Path of Miracles. The jury noted the choir's perfect intonation, precision and sound balance, serving emotionally touching concerts. A reviewer from the Frankfurter Allgemeine Zeitung described the sopranos as "floatingly free" and the basses as "fulminantly rich and sounding like a deep organ register".

== Recordings ==
- Mother and Child
