= Robin Tyson =

English countertenor

- Born: England
- Occupation: Countertenor
- Years active: 1992–present
- Organization: The King's Singers (2001–2009)
- Spouse: Christina Tyson
- Children: 3

Robin Tyson is an English countertenor who has a well documented career in opera, solo, and a cappella. He now works in the music management industry and in particular leads in the choral world.

He sang in the Choir of King's College, Cambridge from 1989–1992. He is known for singing as a soloist with John Eliot Gardiner's Bach Cantata Pilgrimage in 2000. Tyson performed Francesco Cavalli's opera La Calisto at La Monnaie in Brussels, conducted by René Jacobs. He was a member of The King's Singers from 2001 to 2009, with whom he won a Grammy Award for the album Simple Gifts. He started the music agency at Edition Peters in 2011 before taking the agency independent as Podium Music. He is manager for Voces8, composers Ēriks Ešenvalds, Ola Gjeilo, Jason Max Ferdinand and others.

Tyson joined the King's Singers as the second countertenor in 2001, in place of Nigel Short. He left in 2009 and was succeeded by Timothy Wayne-Wright. Tyson was part of the King's Singers production of Spem in Alium by Thomas Tallis, a 40-part piece. Tyson released, along with the Grammy winning Simple Gifts, From Byrd to the Beatles, a documentary covering the making of Spem in Alium, along with numerous other albums and singles.
