= Grayston Ives =

British composer (born 1948)

Charles John Grayston Ives (born 1948), also known as Bill Ives, is a British composer, singer and choral director.

== Education and career ==
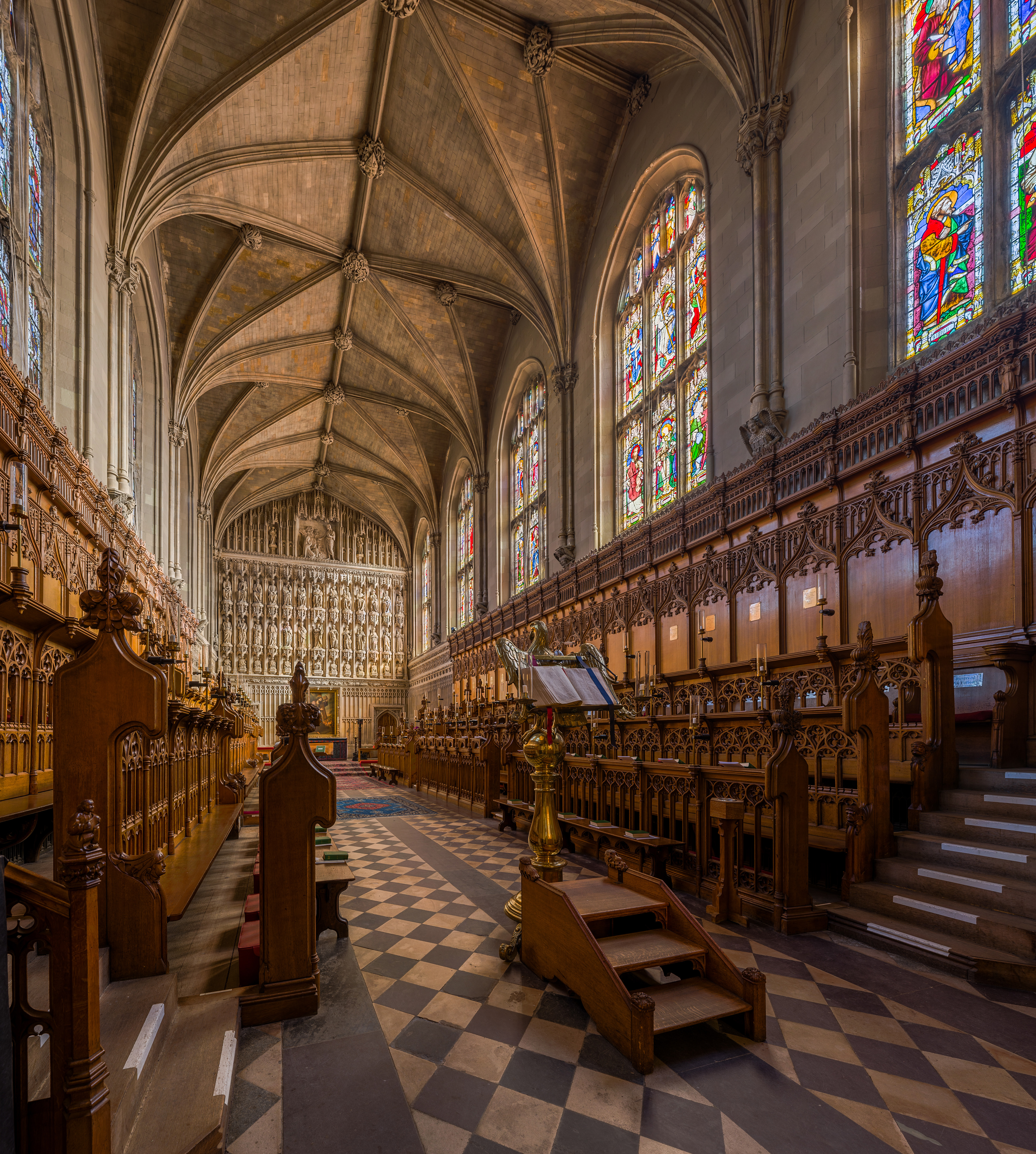
The chapel of Magdalen College, Oxford, where Ives was organist and choir director from 1991 to 2009.

Ives was a chorister at Ely Cathedral and later studied music at Selwyn College, Cambridge, where he held a choral scholarship.

He began his career as a music teacher, before joining the King's Singers from 1978 to 1985. His voice can be heard on a number of recordings from that period, including Paul McCartney's Frog Chorus.

From 1991 to 2009 he was the organist and choir director at Magdalen College, Oxford, where he was also a Fellow and tutor in music. As well as being responsible for the daily musical life of the college chapel, he directed the choir in recordings on the Harmonia Mundi label. The album With a Merrie Noyse, made with the viol consort Fretwork and featuring the works of the English composer Orlando Gibbons, was nominated for a Grammy in 2004. Paul McCartney's Ecce Cor Meum was written especially for the college choir, and the subsequent EMI recording won the Classical BRIT Award for album of the year in 2007. Other recordings with Magdalen College Choir include Listen Sweet Dove, a selection of Ives's liturgical works, and Duruflé's Requiem. The choir developed a fruitful relationship with the film composer George Fenton, notably for Shadowlands (1993), directed by Richard Attenborough.

For his contribution to church music, Ives was made a Fellow of the Royal School of Church Music in 2008. The same year, he was awarded a Lambeth degrees (Doctor of Music) by the Archbishop of Canterbury, Rowan Williams. He is also an emeritus Fellow of Magdalen College, Oxford.

== Compositions ==
As a composer, Ives's work consists mainly of sacred and secular music for choir, much of it written for the liturgy at Magdalen College chapel. His "Canterbury Te Deum" (1991) for SATB and brass quintet was commissioned for the enthronement of George Carey as Archbishop of Canterbury. He was also commissioned to compose the centre-piece anthem, "The Gift of Grace", for the national commemoration service marking the 200th anniversary of the abolition of the slave trade in the British Empire, held at Westminster Abbey in 2007, which was attended by Queen Elizabeth II, Tony Blair and other high-ranking politicians and public figures. Westminster Abbey later commissioned three new arrangements of music by Hubert Parry (I was glad, Hear my words, ye people, and the Coronation Te Deum) for a recording released in 2015. He was commissioned to write a new carol for King's College Cambridge's annual Festival of Nine Lessons and Carols in 2024.

Ives composes as Grayston, but prefers to be known as "Bill", a nickname he acquired at an early age as a result of a role-playing game with his brother.

=== Choral works ===
Canticles and service music
- Canterbury Te Deum
- Missa Brevis (1987, for the choir of New College, Oxford)
- The Edington Service
- The Exon Service
- The Magdalen Service (ATB)
- The Salisbury Service
- The Warwick Service
- Jubilate
- Preces and Responses (SATB and ATB)

Anthems

- A Song of Christ's Glory
- A Song of Divine Love
- Lord, is it I?
- Listen sweet Dove (for Pentecost)
- Nova, nova
- Let all the world
- Nos autem gloriari
- O Sacrum Convivium
- Sicut lilium
- Sweet was the song
- The Canticle of Brother Sun
- There is a land of pure delight
- This is the record of John
- Three Latin Motets
- Ubi caritas
- The Beatitudes (girls' voices, for the 10th anniversary of Derby Cathedral Girls' Choir)
- Ave Maria (SATB)
- All People that on Earth do dwell (for patronal festival of St Matthews, Northampton, 2018)

Arrangements

- I've got you under my skin
- Name that tune
- Rise up, shepherd

Spirituals

- Amazing Grace
- Deep River
- Were you there?

Folksongs

- Buy broom besoms
- The lark in the clear air
- The tailor and the mouse

=== Organ solo ===
- Intrada
- Processional
- Lullaby
- Partita on "Hursley"
