= The Sleeping Child (Chilcott) =

Sacred motet by Hans Leo Hassler

- Motet by Bob Chilcott
- Language: English
- Composed: 2021
- Scoring: soprano and SATB ensemble (divisi)

The Sleeping Child is a 2021 motet by Bob Chilcott for soprano and a vocal ensemble. He set a poem in English by Charles Bennet to music, commissioned by the ensemble Voces8. It was published by Oxford University Press.

== Text and music ==
The poet Charles Bennet has been a frequent collaborator of composer Bob Chilcott. His English text begins: "Sleeping child I wonder, have you a dream to share?"

Chilcott set the music in 2021 like a lullaby. The ensemble opens and closes the music, while the arching melodies of the soprano are at its centre. The child is not named but could by baby Jesus.

The Sleeping Child was recorded by Voces8 as part of their 2023 album A Choral Christnmas that they introduced by concerts in Europe, such as a concert of the Rheingau Musik Festival at the Ringkirche in Wiesbaden on 6 December 2023. The Sleeping Child was chosen Video of the Day by Gramophone on 19 December 2023.
