= David Hurley (singer) =

British countertenor

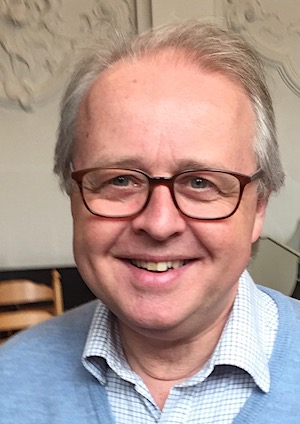
- David Hurley in 2019
- Born: August 1962 (age 64); England
- Occupations: Countertenor, Music teacher
- Organization: The King's Singers (1990-2016)

David Hurley (born August 1962) is a British countertenor who sang with The King's Singers from 1990 to 2016.

Hurley was a chorister at Winchester Cathedral, and a choral scholar at Winchester College in the 1970s attaining a place at New College, Oxford for university (after winning a choral scholarship there) from 1981 until 1984. He became a mainstay in the British countertenor scene shortly after becoming a King's Singer.

Hurley recorded, along with Tyson, Phoenix, Lawson, Gabbitas and Connolly, the 40-part piece Spem in alium by Thomas Tallis (2006), as well as the Grammy Award winning album "Simple Gifts" (2008).

Hurley began teaching at Winchester College in 2019 where he teaches music and geography.
