= Andrew Frisardi =

American poet and writer

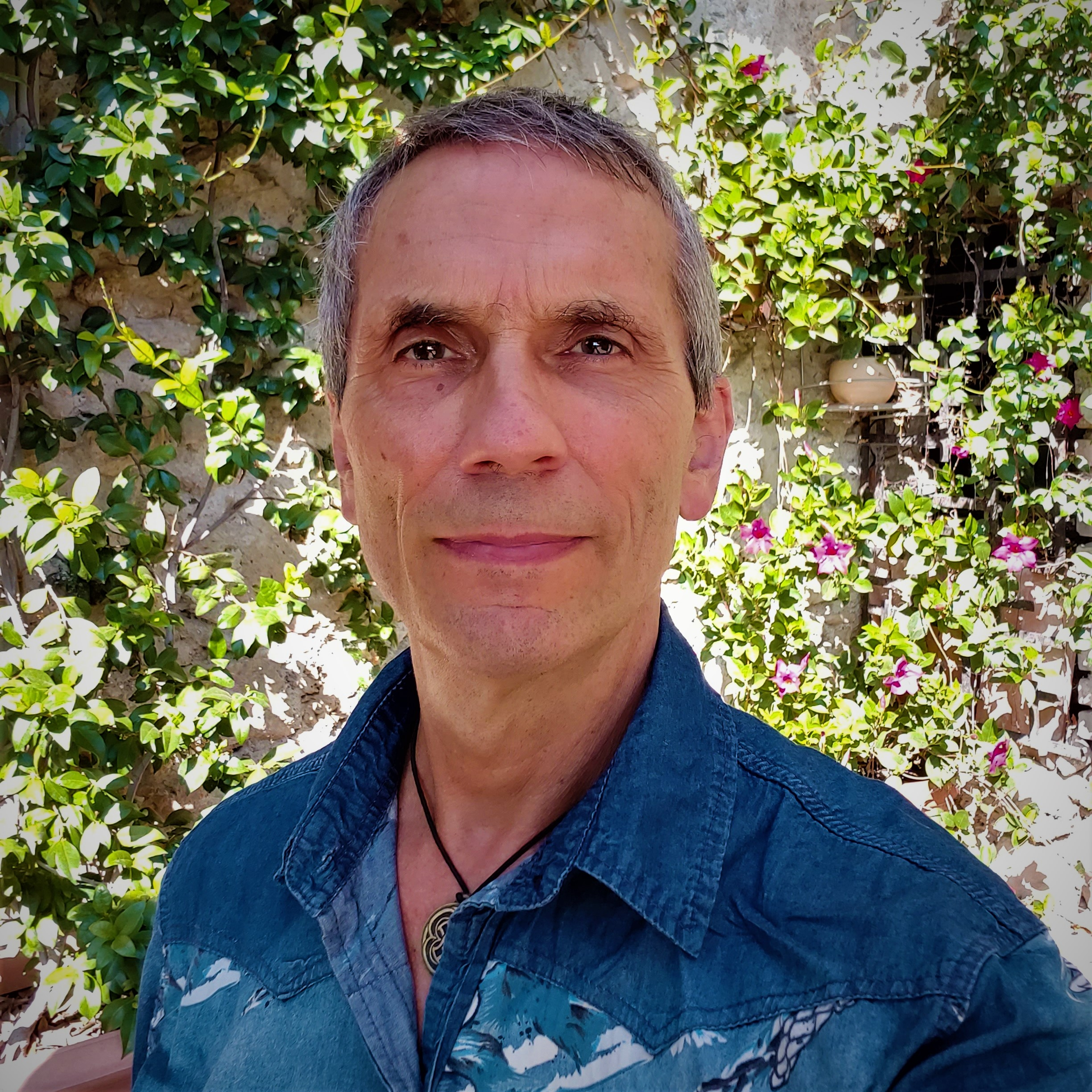
Andrew Frisardi

Andrew Frisardi is an American writer and translator.

He is a Fellow of and frequent lecturer at Temenos Academy, in London, which offers adult education in philosophy and the arts in the light of the sacred traditions of East and West. He also frequently contributes poems, essays, translations, and reviews to the academy's journal, Temenos Academy Review.

Frisardi's poems, translations, and essays, and reviews have appeared in numerous U.S. magazines and journals, including the Atlantic Monthly, Hudson Review, Kenyon Review, New Criterion, New Republic, New Yorker; as well as various anthologies.

He was awarded a Guggenheim Fellowship in 2013 for his work on the first fully annotated translation of Dante's Convivio.

In 2004 he was awarded the Academy of American Poets Raiziss/de Palchi Translation Award book prize for The Selected Poems of Giuseppe Ungaretti.

== Books ==
- The Moon on Elba. Wiseblood Books. 2023. Poems.
- Ancient Salt: Essays on Poets, Poetry, and the Modern World. Wipf & Stock. 2022. ISBN 9781666739169.
- The Harvest and the Lamp. Franciscan University Press. 2020. ISBN 9781733988964. Poems.
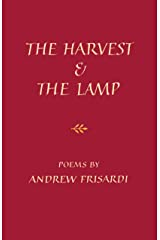
- Love's Scribe: Reading Dante in the Book of Creation. Angelico Press. 2020. ISBN 9781621385615.
- Convivio: A Dual-Language Critical Edition (Convivio). Cambridge University Press. 2018. ISBN 9781107139367. Annotated translation of Dante's Convivio.
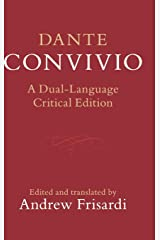
- The Quest for Knowledge in Dante's Convivio. Temenos Academy. 2015. ISBN 978-0992604646. Essays.
- Brian Keeble, Daily Bread: Art and Work in the Reign of Quantity. Edited and introduced by Andrew Frisardi. Angelico Press. 2015. ISBN 978-1621381181.
- Death of a Dissembler. White Violet Press. 2014. ISBN 978-0615926346. Poems.
- The Young Dante and the One Love. Temenos Academy. 2013. ISBN 978-0-9564078-8-7. Essays.
- Vita Nova (Vita Nuova). Northwestern University Press. 2012. ISBN 978-0-8101-2721-0. Annotated translation of Dante's Vita Nuova.
- Air and Memory. Counterpath Press. 2007. ISBN 978-1-933996-03-5. Selected translations from the Milanese dialect poet Franco Loi.
- Giuseppe Ungaretti, Selected Poems: A Bilingual Edition. Farrar, Straus & Giroux and Carcanet Press (UK). 2002–2004. ISBN 978-0-374-52892-8. Translation of the modernist Italian poet Giuseppe Ungaretti.
