= Bob Chilcott =

English choral conductor and composer

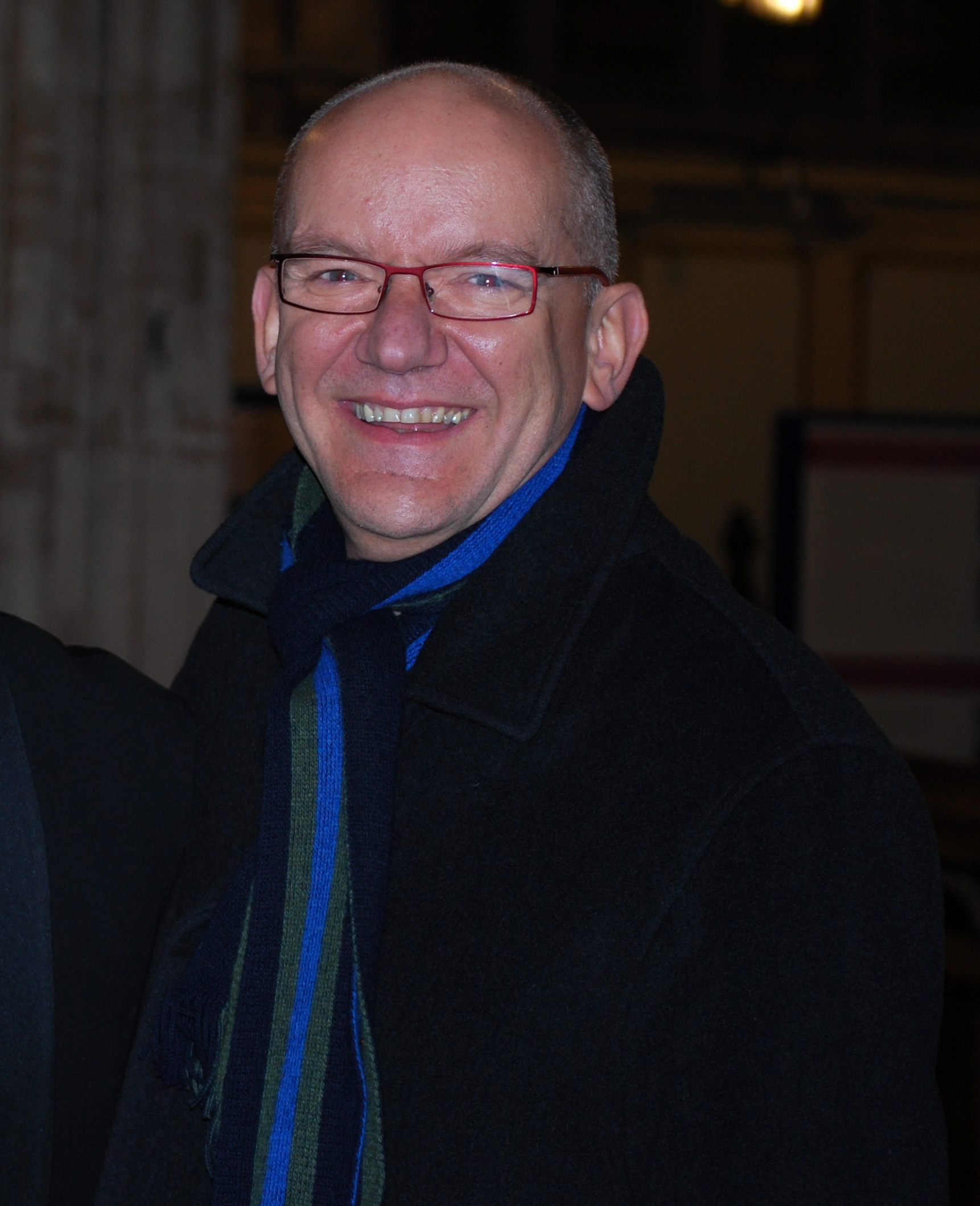
- Chilcott in 2009

Background information
- Born: 9 April 1955 (age 71); Plymouth, England
- Genres: Choral
- Occupations: Choral composer; conductor; singer (tenor)
- Years active: 1967–present

Robert Chilcott (born 9 April 1955) is a British choral composer, conductor, and singer, based in Oxfordshire, England. He was a member of the King's Singers from 1985 to 1997, singing tenor. He has been a composer since 1997.

== Early life and early career ==
Chilcott was born in Plymouth, Devon, in 1955. While still young, he relocated with his family to a new home near Watford, Hertfordshire. Although his family was not musical, he joined the local church choir, where the assistant organist was Andrew Davis. Chilcott sang in the Choir of King's College, Cambridge, both as a boy and as a university student, when he conducted the voluntary Choral Society, which included many singers from other colleges. He performed the Pie Jesu of Fauré's Requiem on the 1967 King's College recording.

== Composer ==
Chilcott is well known for his compositions for children's choirs, including Can You Hear Me?, which he has conducted in the United States, Canada, Australia, Japan, Estonia, Latvia, Germany, and the Czech Republic. He is associated with the New Orleans Children's Chorus and the Crescent City Festival in New Orleans, for which he wrote A Little Jazz Mass, Happy Land, This Day, Be Simple Little Children, and for the 2009 festival, I Lift My Eyes.

Chilcott wrote This Day, a setting of five poems, for a 2006 choral festival in New Orleans; however, that festival was cancelled after Hurricane Katrina. The work eventually premiered on 25 June 2007 at St. Louis Cathedral in New Orleans, by 210 singers from around the United States.

His cantata for choir and percussion The Making of the Drum has been performed by the BBC Singers, the New Zealand Youth Choir, the World Youth Choir (under his direction), the Chamber Choir of Europe, and the Taipei Chamber Singers. Chilcott wrote two larger sacred works, Canticles of Light and Jubilate. The Addison singers performed Canticles of Light in London in 2004 and Jubilate in 2005, both in London and in Carnegie Hall. In 2008, Oxford University Press published his Aesop's Fables for SATB and piano ("The Hare and the Tortoise"; "The Mountain in Labour"; "The Fox and the Grapes"; "North Wind and the Sun"; "The Goose and the Swan").

Chilcott's Requiem was premiered on 13 March 2010 at the Sheldonian in Oxford by the Oxford Bach Choir and the Royal Philharmonic Orchestra, conducted by Nicholas Cleobury. Chilcott conducted the premiere of his On Christmas Night on 12 December 2010 at the university Christian Church of Austin, Texas. The UK premiere of On Christmas Night was given on 28 November 2011 in Rugby School by the Arnold Singers conducted by Richard Dunster-Sigtermans. Christmas Night received its Scottish premiere on 14 December 2011 at the Usher Hall in Edinburgh performed by the Dollar Academy Combined School Choirs.

His setting of the St John Passion is an hour-long work premiered by Wells Cathedral Choir in 2013. It follows the format established by Bach, with the story narrated in recitative by a tenor evangelist interspersed with interjections from the chorus (as the crowd) and from Pilate and Jesus, the whole being interleaved with chorales and meditations sung by the choir. Many of the chorales are new settings of popular hymns.

He wrote a setting of "Gloria" in 2015.

In 2016, his piece "Ophelia, Caliban, and Miranda" premiered at picfest in Eugene, Oregon. Chilcott conducted the festival choir and the accompanying instrumentalists the Yellowjackets. His Christmas Oratorio was commissioned by the Three Choirs Festival and first performed in Gloucester Cathedral on 1 August 2019. In 2021 he composed a motet, The Sleeping Child, for the vocal ensemble Voces8.

In 2023, Chilcott created a new interpretation of the carol The First Noel for the Church of England's 'Follow The Star' campaign.

== Conductor and music administrator ==
Chilcott was the conductor of the chorus at the Royal College of Music in London for seven years, and is Principal Guest Conductor of the BBC Singers. He is also President of Southend Boys' Choir, a choir from Southend-on-Sea which regularly performs at London venues such as the Royal Albert Hall.

Chilcott currently conducts the Birmingham University Singers, one of three auditioned choirs at the University of Birmingham.

== Personal life ==
Chilcott is a Christian. Much of his work has been for church choirs as a result of his faith.
