= James Bigden =

English footballer

Personal information
- Date of birth: 1880
- Place of birth: Poplar, London, England
- Position: Wing half

Senior career*
Years	Team	Apps	(Gls)
1899–1900	Thames Ironworks	11	(0)
1900	Gravesend United	26	(1)
1901–1904	West Ham United	91	(3)
1904–1908	Woolwich Arsenal	75	(1)
1908–1909	Bury	3	(0)
1909–1910	Southend United	4	(0)
- * Club domestic league appearances and goals

James Bigden (1880 – after 1910) was an English association footballer who played as a wing half. Bigden featured with clubs Thames Ironworks, Gravesend United, West Ham United, Arsenal, Bury and Southend United.

== Playing career ==
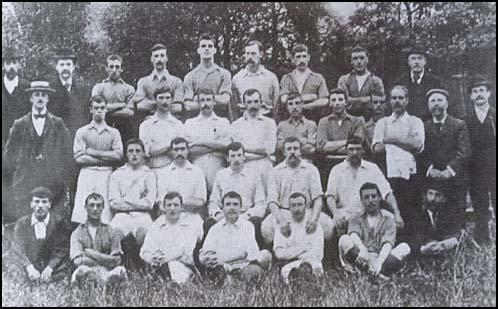
Bigden (5th player in 2nd row) with Thames Ironworks in 1899

Born in Poplar, London, Bigden began his footballing career aged 13 with Old St Lukes where he remained until the beginning of the 1899–1900 season when he joined local team, Thames Ironworks. Described as a hard working half-back he played 11 times in the Southern League and twice in the FA Cup for the Ironworks. The following season Thames Ironworks folded to later become West Ham United. Bigden joined Gravesend United where he played 26 games scoring a single goal. West Ham re-signed him for the 1901–02 season making his debut on 7 September 1901 in a 2–0 away defeat of Bristol Rovers. He played for West Ham for the next three seasons amassing 91 league games, scoring three times. He also played five FA Cup games for them.

In 1904 he joined Woolwich Arsenal, this time playing in the First Division of the Football League. He was a regular in the Arsenal side and helped them reach 7th in the First Division in season 1906–07. Four seasons with Arsenal saw him play 87 games in all including 75 league games scoring a single goal. On 27 June 1908 he moved north and signed for Bury where he made only three appearances before moving south to Southend United. Now playing back in the Southern League, Bigden made only four appearances for Southend before his footballing career ended.
