= Philip Lawson (composer) =

Philip Lawson is a British choral conductor, composer and arranger. For 18 years he was a baritone with the King's Singers and the group's principal arranger for the last fifteen years of that period. In 2009 the group's album "Simple Gifts", on which Lawson arranged 10 out of 15 tracks, won the Grammy award for "Best Classical Crossover Album". In February 2012, he left the King's Singers to concentrate on his writing career.

== Background ==
Philip Lawson was born in Crawley, West Sussex, England, and attended Hazelwick School. He was not from a musical family but a chance meeting introduced him to the boys' choir of Worth Church which sparked his interest in music. He went on to study music at the University of York under Wilfrid Mellers and to sing counter-tenor in the choir of York Minster, under Francis Jackson.

== Singing career ==
Lawson switched from counter-tenor to baritone in 1978 at the age of 21. He moved to London upon graduating and worked for 3 years as a soloist and with choirs including The BBC Singers, The Taverner Choir, Opera Rara and the choirs of St. Paul's Cathedral, Westminster Abbey, and Southwark Cathedral.

From 1982 to 1993, Lawson was a Lay Clerk in Salisbury Cathedral Choir under Richard Seal and from 1989 was Director of Music of Chafyn Grove Preparatory School. During this time he also performed many times with The Sixteen, the English Concert and CM90, and worked as pianist and arranger for a local dance band.

In June 1993, Lawson successfully auditioned for the part of second baritone with The King's Singers, replacing founder-member Simon Carrington. In 1996 he volunteered to fill the vacancy for first baritone, and continued to sing this part until his departure in February 2012.

== Composing and arranging ==
Lawson contributed over 50 arrangements to the repertoire of The King's Singers. He has 10 arrangements on the group's Grammy winning album "Simple Gifts", recorded in 2008 at the studio of Status Quo lead guitarist Francis Rossi. In 2000, Lawson was nominated for a Grammy for Best Classical Crossover Album "Circle Of Life" (Kiss From A Rose; Kokomo; It Had To Be You, Etc.) (Album). Eight years later in 2008, he won a Grammy for the album "Simple Gifts", winning Best Classical Crossover Album at the Grammy Award Ceremony held in Los Angeles in February 2009.

Lawson also wrote the lyrics to "Born on a New Day", the highly successful Christmas version of the King's Singers hit arrangement of "You are the New Day".

Lawson is also a composer of choral music in his own right with more than 250 published titles. Most of his works are in print with Hal Leonard Corporation in the US, but he also has works published by OUP, Schott Music, Boosey and Hawkes, Walton Music, Peters Edition, The Lorenz Corporation, Morningstar Music, Pavane Publications, Alliance Music, Banks Music, Alfred Music, Encore Publications and Schoolplay Productions.

== Conducting ==
Since September 2016 Philip Lawson has been musical director of The Romsey Singers, a chamber choir based in Romsey, near Southampton, and in 2022 was appointed musical director of The Farrant Singers, a chamber choir in Salisbury founded by Richard Lloyd in 1958.

== Teaching ==
Philip Lawson teaches choral singing, composing and arranging, working with choirs and a cappella groups in Europe and the US, and on an individual basis with young composers and arrangers. He spent ten years on the staff of the Vocal Department of Wells Cathedral specialist music school. He is a voice teacher at the University of Bristol. In 2014 and 2016, he was one of two lecturers at the European Seminar For Young Composers held in Aosta, Italy, sponsored by the Italian national choral foundation Feniarco and the European Choral Association. He has been described by Choir & Organ magazine as a "choral polymath".

== Discography ==
Philip Lawson appears on all King's Singers recordings from 1994 to 2012:

=== As second baritone ===
- English Renaissance
- Sermons and Devotions
- Ligeti Nonsense Madrigals (part of the Sony Complete Ligeti collection)
- Spirit Voices (includes guest artists Bruce Johnston, Mike Love, Midge Ure, Dewey Bunnell, Gerry Beckley and James Warren)

=== As first baritone ===
CDs

- Runnin' Wild (as guests of the Boston Pops Orchestra, conductor Keith Lockhart)
- Circle of Life (with the Metropol Orchestra, conductor Carl Davis) – Grammy nomination 2000
- Nightsong (with pianist Roger Vignoles)
- Streetsongs (with percussionist Evelyn Glennie)
- Firewater (with Andrew Lawrence-King and the Harp Consort)
- Music of the Beatles (with the Cincinnati Pops Orchestra, conductor Erich Kunzel)
- The Triumphs of Oriana
- Christmas
- Gesualdo Tenebrae Responsories
- Treason and Dischord (with Concordia)
- Sacred Bridges (with Sarband Ensemble)
- Spem in Alium
- The Quiet Heart
- Landscape and Time
- The Golden Age
- Simple Gifts – Grammy win 2009 – Best Crossover album
- Live at the BBC Proms
- Reflections
- Romance du Soir
- From the Heart
- Pachelbel Vespers (with Charivari Ensemble)
- Swimming over London
- In this quiet moment
- Christmas Oratorio (with the WDR Big Band)
- Joy to the world
- High Flight
- Light and Gold (with Eric Whitacre) – Grammy win 2012
- Royal Rhymes and Rounds

DVDs

- A workshop video
- From Byrd to the Beatles (live at Cadogan Hall)
- Live at the BBC Proms – Midem award 2010 – Best Concert DVD
- Joy to the world
