= Simon Carrington =

British musician

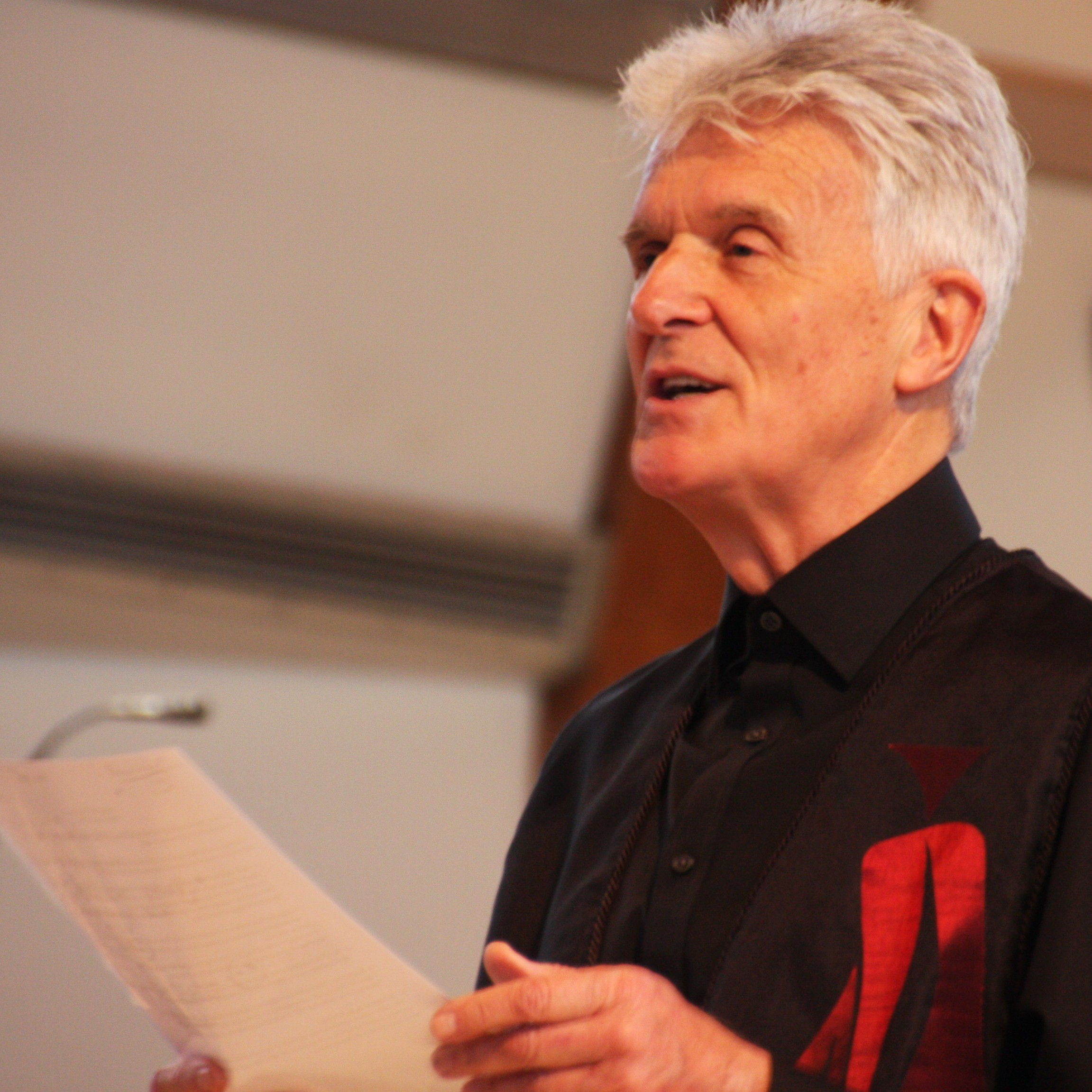
Carrington in 2017

Simon Carrington (born 1942) is an English conductor, singer and double bass player. He was a founding member and member for 25 years of the Grammy Award-winning vocal ensemble the King's Singers; he subsequently worked for 15 years in the United States and now divides his time between London and southwest France. He speaks French and German and holds British and American citizenship. He is father of the British "music comedian" and cello player Rebecca Carrington.

== Early life ==
Carrington was born in the county of Wiltshire. He was a chorister at Christ Church Cathedral School in Oxford, earned a music exhibition to the King's School, Canterbury, and then read English and music at King's College, Cambridge, as a choral scholar alongside most of the original King's Singers. He completed his master's degree in 1965 and then qualified as a teacher at New College, Oxford.

== Career ==
From 1968 to 1993, Carrington was a member and co-director of the King's Singers. During this time he was also a freelance double bass player and was regularly invited as a guest performer, in particular with the BBC Philharmonic and the Monteverdi Orchestra.

He is also the (uncredited) singer in the end credits of the first series of the 1983 BBC sitcom The Black Adder.

Carrington moved to the United States in 1994 and accepted a position at the University of Kansas where he served as Director of Choral Activities, professor, and artist in residence. After Kansas, he became Director of Choral Activities at the New England Conservatory in Boston. He became professor of conducting at the Yale School of Music in 2003 and founded the Yale Schola Cantorum which he directed for six years. He was appointed a professor emeritus at Yale University in 2009 and now regularly conducts concerts, workshops and masterclasses around the world.

== Personal life ==
He divides his time between southwest England and southwest France where he lives with Hilary, his wife, a professional pianist. Their daughter Rebecca, lives in Berlin, and their singer-songwriter son, James, lives in Los Angeles.
