= Convivio =

Unfinished written work of Dante Alighieri

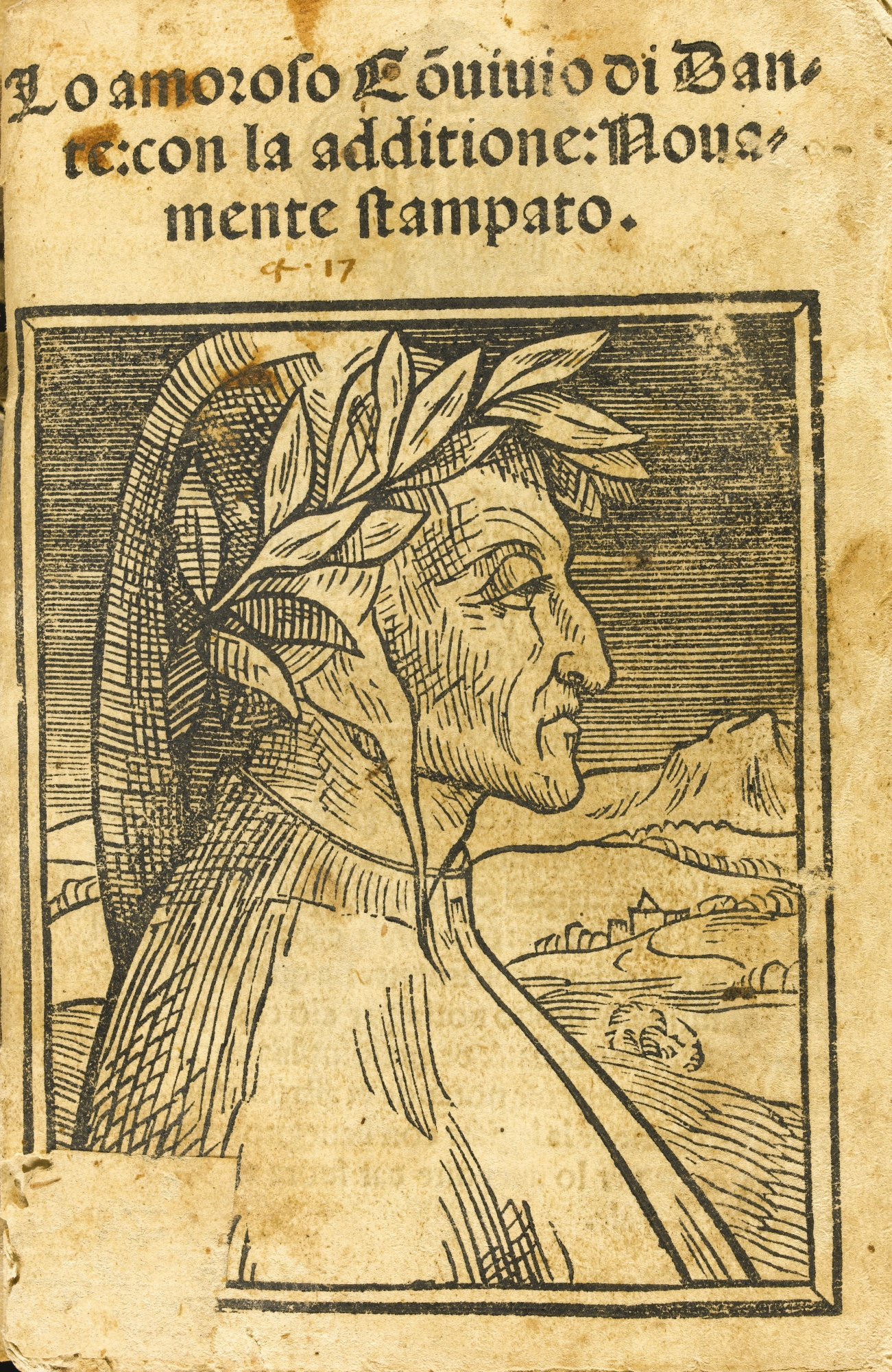
1521 edition of Convivio, retitled to Lo amoroso Convivio di Dante

Convivio (Italian pronunciation: [koɱˈviːvjo]; "The Banquet") is an unfinished work written by Dante Alighieri roughly between 1304 and 1307. It consists of four books, or "tratatti": a prefatory one, plus three books that each include a canzone (long lyrical poem) and a prose allegorical interpretation or commentary of the poem that goes off in multiple thematic directions.

== Summary ==
The Convivio is a kind of vernacular encyclopedia of the knowledge of Dante's time; it touches on many areas of learning, not only philosophy but also politics, linguistics, science, astronomy, and history. The treatise begins with the prefatory book, or proem, which explains why a book like the Convivio is needed and why Dante is writing it in the vernacular (Tuscan language) instead of Latin. It is one of Dante's early defenses of the vernacular, expressed in greater detail in his (slightly earlier) linguistic treatise De vulgari eloquentia (On Eloquence in the Vernacular).

Books 2 and 3 form a unit, both focusing on Dante's new love after the death of Beatrice—his love for Lady Philosophy, "the most beautiful and dignified daughter of the Emperor of the universe," as he calls her. Book 2 discusses allegory and Lady Philosophy using the canzone Voi che 'ntendendo il terzo ciel movete (You who move the third heaven with an act of the intellect), which opens the book. It also discusses such subjects as astronomy, angelology, and the soul's immortality. Book 3 is a hymn of praise for philosophy, launched by an allegorical interpretation of Dante's great canzone Amor che ne la mente mi ragiona (Love, who speaks to me in my mind). In this book, Dante asserts that true philosophy cannot arise from any ulterior motives, such as prestige or money—it is only possible when the seeker has a love of wisdom for its own sake.

Book 4 is by far the longest of the Convivio, and is noticeably distinct from the two books that precede it. The subject of book 4 is the nature of nobility. It opens with the longest canzone of the Convivio, Le dolci rime d’amor (Those sweet poems of love), which is explicitly about gentilezza or nobility, as well as a condemnation of avarice, asserting that reason and the spirit of acquisition are mutually incompatible. The first half of book 4's thirty chapters are dedicated to debunking the false idea of nobility as an inherited trait, one restricted to the aristocracy, while the final fifteen chapters delineate what true nobility consists of—the perfection of a thing according to its nature—and how nobility manifests in people at various stages of life. The Convivio, in its autobiographical passages and in the trajectories of its lines of thought, gives us a rich portrait of Dante himself, of great importance for an understanding of his work as a whole, especially the Divine Comedy.

== Analysis ==
The Convivio is a major stage of development for Dante, very different from the visionary world of the Vita Nuova (although like the earlier work it too is a medium for the author’s evolving sense of artistic vocation and philosophical-spiritual quest). This difference is reflected in how the two works use the prosimetrum format: in the Vita Nova there is a complex interrelation and intertwining between the prose and the poetry, while in the Convivio large blocks of prose have an autonomous existence apart from the poems; the content of the poetry is not amplified or edited in the prose so much as commented upon prosaically, to serve as points of departure for the various subjects that the Convivio discusses. Dante himself tells us that the prose of the Convivio is "temperate and virile," in contrast to the "fervid and passionate" prose of the Vita Nova; and that while the approach to this in the work of his youth was "like dreaming" the Convivio approaches it subjects soberly and wide awake, often modeling its style on Scholastic authors.

== Bibliography ==
- Dante: Convivio: A Dual-Language Critical Edition. Translation, introduction, and notes by Andrew Frisardi. Cambridge University Press, 2018. ISBN 9781107139367.
- Frisardi, Andrew (2015). The Quest for Knowledge in Dante's Convivio. London: Temenos Academy. p. 52. ISBN 978-0992604646.
