= Temenos Academy =

Charity in London which aims to offer education in philosophy and the arts

The Temenos Academy, or Temenos Academy of Integral Studies, is an educational charity in London which aims to offer education in philosophy and the arts in what it calls "the light of the sacred traditions of East and West". The organization's vision is based upon the perennial philosophy.

The academy had its origins in the Temenos journal, which was launched in 1980 by Kathleen Raine, Keith Critchlow, Brian Keeble and Philip Sherrard to publish creative work which regarded spirituality as a prime need for humanity. Thirteen issues of Temenos were published between 1981 and 1992.

In 1990 the academy was founded to extend the project through lectures and study groups. It was accommodated initially in the Prince of Wales's Institute of Architecture in Regent's Park. Charles III has been a patron of the academy since its founding. Raine described it as “an invisible college for our future king.” Since the closure of the Institute of Architecture, the academy now holds meetings in different venues in London.

As of 2015 Temenos offered a two-year part-time diploma course in the perennial philosophy.

The journal Temenos was continued as the Temenos Academy Review.

== Lecturers ==
Temenos lecturers have included Hossein Elahi Ghomshei, Z'ev ben Shimon Halevi (Warren Kenton), Wendell Berry, and Seyyed Hossein Nasr. Some of its most frequent lecturers have been Traditionalists, though the majority of its lecturers have not been associated with that philosophy. The academy staged a talk by the Dalai Lama during his visit to London in 2004.

== Temenos Academy Review ==
The Temenos Academy Review is a journal published in London by the Temenos Academy since 1998. As per the academy, "The Review comprises a mixture of papers given at the Academy and new work, including poetry, art, and reviews." Its predecessor, Temenos, was published from 1981 to 1992 and inspired The Prince of Wales to sponsor the creation of the Temenos Academy in 1990.

Temenos launched in 1980, with first publication in 1981. Temenos was cofounded by Kathleen Raine, Philip Sherrard, Keith Critchlow and Brian Keeble, and was produced for thirteen volumes, with Raine becoming the sole editor by the fourth issue. The word "temenos" means "sacred place" or "sacred enclosure". The journal had an objective of "The affirmation, at the highest level of scholarship and talent, and in terms of the contemporary situation, of the Sacred." The Prince of Wales was sufficiently impressed by the journal to sponsor a school based "on truth, beauty and goodness", and this led to the creation of the Temenos Academy in 1990. Henri Corbin's L'Universite de St Jean de Jerusaleme school founded in Paris in 1974, was an inspiration for the founding of Temenos Academy. But while Corbin's school held to an Abrahamic tradition, the new teaching organisation also looked to the teaching of Buddhism and Hinduism. The thirteenth and last issue of Temenos appeared in 1992.

By 1998, the journal reappeared as the Temenos Academy Review and three more volumes were edited by Kathleen Raine. Grevel Lindop was editor for the review from 2000 to 2003; and volume 7, the Kathleen Raine Memorial Issue, was edited by Brian Keeble. As of 2016, there have been 18 volumes. Contributing authors include Wendell Berry, Prince Charles, Karan Singh and Seyyed Hossein Nasr.

The headquarters of Temenos Academy Review are in Ashford, Kent.

== Sources ==
- Sedgwick, Mark. Against the Modern World. Oxford University Press. 2009.
