= Yale Schola Cantorum =

The Yale Schola Cantorum, under the direction of principal conductor David Hill, is an internationally renowned chamber choir that performs regularly in concert and for occasional choral services throughout the academic year. Supported by the Yale Institute of Sacred Music with Yale School of Music, the choir specializes in repertoire from before 1750 and the last hundred years. The Schola Cantorum was founded in 2003 by Simon Carrington and he directed it for six years; from 2009 to 2013, it was led by conductor Masaaki Suzuki, who remains its principal guest conductor. In recent years, the choir has also sung under the direction of internationally renowned conductors Simon Halsey, Paul Hillier, Stephen Layton, Sir Neville Marriner, Nicholas McGegan, James O'Donnell, Stefan Parkman, Krzysztof Penderecki, Helmuth Rilling, and Dale Warland.

Yale Schola Cantorum regularly partners with Juilliard415, the Juilliard School's principal period ensemble, for performances in New Haven and New York City. In addition, the Schola Cantorum records and tours nationally and internationally. The Schola Cantorum’s live recording of Heinrich Biber’s 1693 Vesperae longiores ac breviores with Robert Mealy and Yale Collegium Musicum received international acclaim from the early music press, as have subsequent CDs of J. S. Bach’s rarely heard 1725 version of the St. John Passion and Antonio Bertali’s Missa resurrectionis. A commercial recording on the Naxos label of Mendelssohn and Bach Magnificats was released in 2009.

Yale Schola Cantorum is among the most selective choirs in the United States and is open by audition to any student at Yale University, although many of its singers are affiliated with the School of Music.
