= Alf Bigden =

British drummer

- Alf Bigden playing on the BBC in 1978

Background information
- Born: Alfred William Bigden; 1 March 1932; Stepney, London, England
- Died: 12 October 2007 (aged 75) Holland-on-Sea, Essex, England
- Genres: Lounge, jazz, big band
- Occupation: Musician
- Instrument: Drums
- Years active: 1950s–2007
- Formerly of: The Ronnie Hazlehurst Orchestra; The London Festival Orchestra; The Geoff Love Orchestra; The Ray Davies Orchestra; The Edmundo Ros Orchestra; Ronnie Aldrich, His Two Pianos and Orchestra

Alfred William Bigden (1 March 1932 – 12 October 2007) was a British drummer mainly active from the 1960s to the early 2000s. Bigden had been "drummer for such stars as Tom Jones, Cilla Black, Shirley Bassey, Sir Cliff Richard, Kylie Minogue, Eartha Kitt, Lionel Richie, Andy Williams and Tony Bennett", as well as for Stéphane Grappelli on at least one of his albums.

== Biography ==
Born to Alf & Sarah Bigden with younger sister Margaret and younger brother Colin. Grew up mainly in Dagenham, Essex.

In demand as a session drummer throughout the 1970s and 1980s, Bigden played on albums for Alan Hawkshaw, Don Lusher, Geoff Love, Pete Moore and Ray Davies, amongst others. Referring to Bigden, Hawkshaw once said in an interview that "Alf was an amazing drummer; he could more or less put his hand to anything". Don Lusher also commented that "It was Alf Bigden, then Ronnie Verrell. Yes – any way of drumming you like, they've got it".

=== BBC work ===
Alongside the session work, Bigden also played in then BBC musical director Ronnie Hazlehurst's 'house orchestra', playing on Hazlehurst's compositions and arrangements for the BBC throughout the 1970s and 1980s, on such pieces as the beginning and end themes to Only Fools And Horses (as well as appearing in the episode "The Jolly Boys' Outing" in 1989 as a drummer in the Mardi Gras club), The Fall and Rise of Reginald Perrin, Are You Being Served?, To the Manor Born and the main theme and incidental music for The Two Ronnies, amongst others.

As the BBC's 'house drummer' throughout most of the 1970s and 1980s, Bigden also played in the orchestra for the Eurovision Song Contest, when it was hosted by the BBC (and arranged by Hazlehurst) in 1974, 1977 and 1982. He also played in the orchestra for many of the Royal Variety Performances over the same period.

=== Film scores ===
Amongst other credits, Bigden played the drums on many of the James Bond scores, with Henry Mancini for the Pink Panther movies, as well as Oliver!, The Dam Busters and The Dirty Dozen.

=== Later work ===
Bigden was active as a drummer and tutor until shortly before his death at the age of 75, on 12 October 2007 at his home in Holland-on-Sea.
