= Sarband =

Sarband is a German early music ensemble with musicians from 7 nations, focusing on musical connections between Orient & Occident; Jewish, Christian & Muslim music. The group was founded in 1986 by Dr. Vladimir Ivanoff. Since then, Sarband has performed more than 500 concerts on four continents and released 14 CDs.

== Awards ==
Grammy Nomination 1992, Echo Klassik 2003, Echo Klassik 2006, Premio Mousiké 2007, German Worldmusic Award Ruth 2008.

== Discography ==
- 2016: All Roads lead Home - Christmas Compilation
- 2009: The Arabian Passion according to J. S. Bach
- 2006: Vox Feminae
- 2005: King's Singers & Sarband: Sacred Bridges
- 2005: Concerto Koeln & Sarband: The Waltz
- 2005: Ensemble Sarband: Satie En Orient
- 2003: Concerto Koeln & Sarband: Dream of the Orient
- 2003: Pilgrims of the Soul
- 2001: Alla Turca: Oriental Obsession
- 2000: Danse Gothique
- 1998: Fallen Women
- 1997: Sacred Women: Women as Composers and Performers of Medieval Chant (Dorian Recordings DOR 93235)
- 1996: Sepharad
- 1995: Sephardic Songs
- 1994: Llibre Vermell de Montserrat
- 1992: Music of the Emperors
- 1990: Cantico
- 1989: Mystère de Voix Bulgares & Sarband: Mystères
