= Nigel Short (singer) =

British singer

- Born: 1965 or 1966 (age 59–60)
- Education: Royal College of Music
- Occupations: Countertenor; Choral conductor
- Organizations: The King's Singers; Tenebrae

Nigel Short is a British singer who is the founder and artistic director of the choir Tenebrae and Tenebrae Consort. He was previously a member of The King's Singers.

Short was a chorister at St Alphege Church, Solihull. He then studied singing and piano at the Royal College of Music before singing as a countertenor with a number of ensembles including The Tallis Scholars, Westminster Abbey and Westminster Cathedral choirs and The King's Consort. He then pursued a solo career in opera and oratorio, singing several roles in opera productions in Europe and for the English National Opera and Opera North.

In 1993 Short, then aged 27, joined The King's Singers. It was while performing with this ensemble that Short conceived of creating a larger group of singers capable of more "passionate sounds" combined with "the precision of ensembles like The King's Singers", and a more "theatrical" style of performing within religious buildings, involving movement around the performance venue as well as dramatic use of lighting and ambiance. The result was Tenebrae, founded in 2001. The choir was launched that year with a performance of Nigel Short's own composition, The Dream of Herod. The choir has extensively toured to critical acclaim, and won the Choral category of BBC Music Magazine's Awards in 2012.

In 2009 Short was appointed Director of Music at the church of St Bartholomew-the-Great, London, where he directed the professional Priory Church Choir. He held this post until 2015.

Nigel Short is also a recording producer for Signum Records, producing the albums A Choral Christmas with the Rodolfus Choir conducted by Ralph Allwood and Invisible Stars with the Choral Scholars of University College Dublin conducted by Desmond Earley.

In 2021 Short and Tenebrae worked with the Self-Isolation Choir on Thomas Tallis's 40-part Spem in alium. The Tenebrae singers recorded each of the 40 parts, and Short conducted 40 rehearsals of 90 minutes, broadcast live on Youtube and available for choir members to watch again, in July and August. Choir members were invited to contribute recordings of their own contributions, to be edited into a performance to be broadcast in October 2021. The score used was that prepared by Hugh Keyte in 2020 for the Thomas Tallis Society.
