= John J. Studzinski =

American-British investment banker and philanthropist

John J. Studzinski CBE
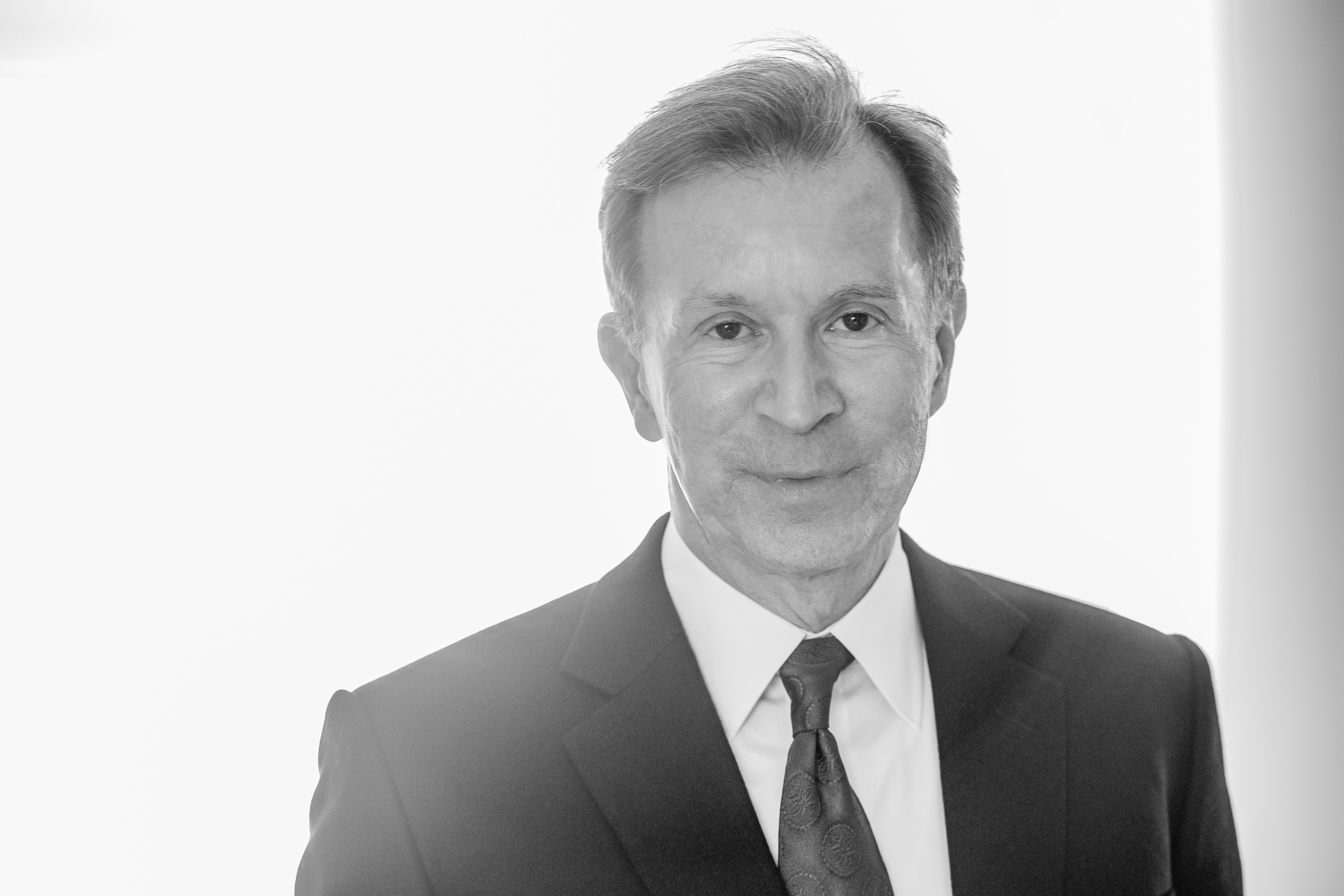
- Born: 19 March 1956 (age 70); Peabody, Massachusetts, US
- Citizenship: US, UK
- Education: Bowdoin College (BA); University of Chicago (MBA)
- Occupations: Investment banker, philanthropist
- Known for: Genesis Foundation
- Title: Managing director and vice chairman at PIMCO

John Joseph Paul Studzinski, CBE (born 19 March 1956) is an American-British investment banker and philanthropist. Since September 2018 he has been managing director and vice chairman of the global investment-management firm PIMCO.

Prior to joining PIMCO, he was vice chairman of investor relations and business development and a senior managing director at Blackstone Inc. He had joined Blackstone in 2006 as global head of Blackstone Advisory Partners, the company's mergers and acquisitions advisory arm, and he ran that division for nearly a decade. Prior to joining Blackstone, he was at Morgan Stanley from 1980 to 2003, and at HSBC from 2003 to 2006, building mergers-and-acquisitions divisions in both institutions.

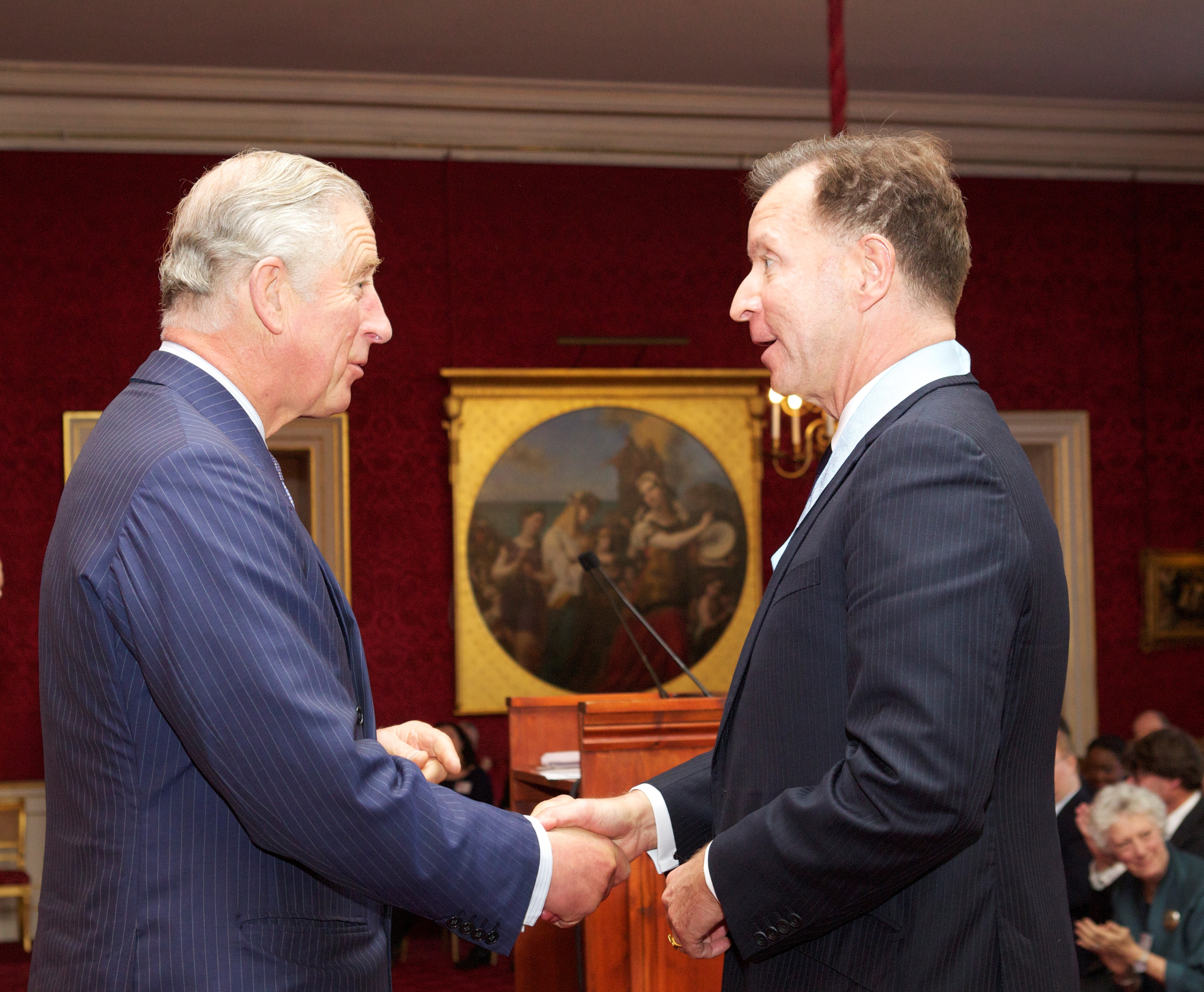
John Studzinski and Charles III

Studzinski is involved in philanthropy, patronage, and charity work, mainly around the arts, the homeless, and human rights. His charity, the Genesis Foundation, supports creatives early in their careers. He co-founded and chairs the Arise Foundation, which combats human trafficking and slavery.

Born and raised in the U.S., Studzinski moved to the UK in 1984, and holds American and British citizenship. Since 2006, he has divided his time between London and New York.

== Early life and education ==
John Studzinski was born on 19 March 1956, in Peabody, Massachusetts, a town 15 miles northeast of Boston. His parents were working-class Polish immigrants, and his father was a financial manager at General Electric's aircraft-engine division. Education and industriousness were emphasized in the family, and music as well. His was a traditional Polish Catholic family and community, and Catholicism and Christianity were a bedrock in his life. He worked in soup kitchens as a teenager, and helped start a toll-free number to inform adolescents about sexually transmitted diseases.

Studzinski attended prep school at St. John's Preparatory School in Massachusetts, graduating in 1974. He graduated magna cum laude from Bowdoin College in 1978, with a BA degree in biology and sociology. He received an MBA in finance and marketing from the University of Chicago in 1980.

== Career ==
=== Morgan Stanley ===
After receiving his MBA, Studzinski began his investment banking career in New York in 1980 on Wall Street at Morgan Stanley. He spent 23 years at the company, in positions of increasing responsibility. In 1984 he moved to London to create and build Morgan Stanley's European mergers and acquisitions (M&A) advisory business. He served as head of the European investment banking division and deputy chairman of Morgan Stanley International. By the time he left Morgan Stanley in 2003, the division he built was the number three European M&A advisory.

=== HSBC ===
In June 2003, Sir John Bond at London-based multinational bank giant HSBC hired Studzinski to create and build an investment banking division, along with Stuart Gulliver. As co-head of investment banking at HSBC Group, and a member of the Group Management Board, Studzinski was in charge of mergers and acquisitions, while Gulliver built the markets side of the investment banking franchise. Studzinski made a number of hirings, and grew the new M&A division. After three years at HSBC, following Bond's retirement, Studzinski left for Blackstone in May 2006.

=== Blackstone ===
In 2006, Studzinski joined Blackstone Inc., an American multinational corporation based in New York City. He joined as the senior managing director in its investment and advisory group and as a member of the firm's executive committee. He was recruited to oversee and develop Blackstone's mergers-and-acquisitions advisory business, Blackstone Advisory Partners, in the United States and Europe, and to open an office in London. CEO Stephen A. Schwarzman said in 2006 that Studzinski's "outstanding track record in transatlantic investment banking will be invaluable in accelerating the growth of our advisory business".

Studzinski is based in both New York and London. His primary role as global head of Blackstone Advisory Partners was to oversee Blackstone's corporate M&A advisory services business in the U.S., and further develop the corporate M&A advisory business in Europe and Asia. He was personally involved in many of the firm's largest advisory assignments. He advised multinational corporations, conglomerates, governments, banks, and institutions, on acquisitions, equity investments, restructurings, spin-offs, mergers, and overseas operations.

In early 2015, Blackstone began spinning off three of its divisions, including its M&A advisory group, to avoid any potential conflicts of interest with its primary private-equity business. After assisting with the transition, Studzinski became Vice Chairman of Investor Relations and Business Development at Blackstone. In this capacity, he holds responsibility for a number of sovereign and international institutional relationships, as well as ultra high-net-worth families outside the U.S.

=== PIMCO ===
In September 2018, Studzinski was appointed to the newly created roles of managing director and vice chairman of the global investment-management firm PIMCO. He acts as an advisor to PIMCO clients including governments, pension funds, corporations, sovereign wealth funds, family offices, and foundations. He will also help PIMCO's expand globally.

He spends his time in London, New York, and Asia Pacific and he reports directly to CEO Emmanuel Roman.

=== A Talent for Giving ===
In September 2025, John’s first book A Talent for Giving was published by Bloomsbury Publishing, released in the UK on 18 September and in the US on 18 November.

The book explores the philosophy and practice of what John Studzinski calls entrepreneurial giving. Through his advocacy of an entrepreneurial approach, John encourages readers to discover how best to channel their passions and apply their talents to creating a more generous society.

The Financial Times placed A Talent for Giving on its top business reading list for November 2025, noting it "makes a powerful, practical case for a hands-on, face-to-face approach to giving and volunteering".

Prime Minister of Canada Mark Carney described the book as "a pilgrimage we can all follow to multiply our unique talents, transform ourselves, and promote the common good" while the artist Grayson Perry said it "made me really think about what it means to give, to care, to be generous."

== Philanthropy ==
In his philanthropic activities, Studzinski focuses primarily on the arts and creative industries, human rights and homelessness. He consistently emphasises the importance of human dignity and the role in philanthropy of mentoring and active networks. In 2008, he was awarded a CBE for his Services to the Arts and Charity and he has received a number of other awards for his philanthropic activities.

=== Arts ===
==== Genesis Foundation ====
In 2001 Studzinski established the Genesis Foundation, a UK-registered charity. It supports and nurtures outstanding artists and creative professionals, especially in the early stages of careers in music, theatre, and the visual arts. The Genesis Foundation has supported thousands of artists with funding totalling more than £22 million.

The Foundation mainly operates through partnerships with leading British arts organisations such as the Almeida Theatre, National Theatre, Royal Court Theatre, The Sixteen, Jewish Literary Foundation and Royal Academy of Arts. The programmes funded by the Genesis Foundation train and mentor early and mid-career artists in playwriting, the creation of music theatre, directing, singing, conducting, theatre design, art curation and the writing of fiction and non-fiction.

While its core funding is devoted to training programmes that equip emerging artists for life as a creative professional, the Genesis Foundation is also the UK's largest commissioner of sacred music, having commissioned 30 new choral works to date.

Among these is James MacMillan's Stabat mater, a 60-minute work for choir and string orchestra commissioned by the Genesis Foundation and premiered by Harry Christophers, The Sixteen and Britten Sinfonia at the Barbican Centre, London in October 2016. The Stabat mater has been described as a masterpiece and the recording of the work has won numerous awards. In April 2018 a performance of MacMillan's Stabat mater, presented by the Genesis Foundation, became the first concert to be live-streamed from the Sistine Chapel in the Vatican. The work subsequently received its US premiere in New York at Lincoln Center's Alice Tully Hall (November 2019), again with Harry Christophers conducting The Sixteen.

In October 2022, the Genesis Foundation presented the concert A Tribute to the Life and Reign of Elizabeth II: A Garland for the Queen in the Chapel Royal of St Peter ad Vincula at the Tower of London. The performers were once again Harry Christophers and The Sixteen, and the programme included the Genesis Foundation's 30th choral commission, Cecilia McDowall's 'O Lord, Make Thy Servant, Elizabeth'. In addition to the invited audience at the Tower of London, the concert reached a large global audience via a live-stream hosted by Classic FM. Each major concert organised by the Genesis Foundation since 2016 has been live-streamed in this way.

In 2020, the Genesis Foundation launched two initiatives prompted by the pandemic: firstly, the £100,000 Covid-19 Artists Fund, an emergency response to help freelance creative professionals facing hardship caused by the lockdowns and, secondly the £1million Genesis Kickstart Fund to provide grants for future-facing arts projects across the UK. When launching the Kickstart fund, Studzinski said: "Covid-19 has changed the world for all of us, and at this crucial juncture we cannot afford to risk losing a whole generation of outstanding creative talent through lack of opportunity. The pandemic has jeopardised the current livelihoods and long-term careers of both young and established professionals in the arts, with freelancers especially adversely affected. The Genesis Foundation's new £1million fund will engender vital new opportunities for creative professionals through paid work on exciting, innovative and well-structured projects." The Genesis Kickstart Fund funded 95 new creative projects involving 1,000 freelance creative professionals and ran from 2021 to March 2023.

Inaugurated in 2012, the Genesis Foundation Prize is a £25,000 prize awarded bi-annually to a mentor whose work has effected real change in the practice and careers of arts professionals. Its 2022 recipient was George Turvey, Artistic Director of the award-winning Papatango Theatre Company.

Since 2001, Genesis Foundation initiatives have also included the Genesis Opera Project (Aldeburgh/Almeida), the Royal Court Theatre's International Playwrights Programme, Genesis LAMDA Scholarships and LAMDA Network, and playwriting residencies at New York's Signature Theatre. The Foundation was the sole sponsor of two major London exhibitions, Living with gods at the British Museum in 2017, and Michelangelo/Bill Viola at the Royal Academy in 2019.

=== The homeless ===
The Financial Times has called Studzinski a "champion of homeless charity work in London". In 1980 he became a co-founder of the Passage Day Centre in London, which has since evolved into the UK's largest centre for homeless and insecurely housed people. He is currently engaged in broadening The Passage's ambassadorial and capital base. In addition, he supports the homeless charity Emmaus UK.

In 1998 Studzinski co-launched, and became the first chairman of, Business Action on Homelessness, a partnership between Business in the Community (BITC), major companies, homeless agencies, and the British government. The organisation works to change the perceptions companies have of homelessness and helps homeless people back into employment. In 2022, at the 40th anniversary of the founding of Business in the Community, Studzinski was named a Fellow of BITC for his leadership of Business Action on Homelessness and his work in support of the former Prince of Wales' Seeing is Believing programme.

=== Human rights ===
Now vice chair emeritus of Human Rights Watch, Studzinski was an active board member of the NGO for 18 years, running its investment, audit and fundraising committees and establishing its operations in Europe, India, and Japan. He has stated that his involvement in Human Rights Watch is an extension of his strong belief in "respect for humanity, justice and dignity. Human dignity, the respect for human life and dignity".

In 2016 he co-founded the Arise Foundation, which combats slavery and human trafficking on the front line around the world. In 2020 he stepped down from chairing the charity to become its Founding President.

From 2016 to 2020, Studzinski served as a non-executive director at the UK government's Home Office, covering audit, risk and compliance, modern slavery and supply-chain transparency, and acted as co-chair of the Business Against Slavery Forum, a UK Government initiative.

=== Additional adviserships ===
In the US, Studzinski serves on the boards of the J. Paul Getty Trust and the American Associates of the Saint Catherine Foundation.

In the UK he has been chairman of Benjamin Franklin House Museum since 2008 and in 2018 he endowed the £2million Chair of Innovation at the Royal College of Art, where he served from 2011 to 2020 as a Council member. From 2009 to 2020 he was Chair of Create London, a charity which works with artists to realise new social enterprises, charities and cultural spaces in some of the UK's most deprived communities.

Over three terms on the board of the Tate (1998-2007), Studzinski participated in the conceptualisation of both Tate Modern 1 and Tate Modern 2, and in fundraising and building projects. Over four decades he donated some £8 million to the Tate.

=== Other activities ===
Studzinski supports the Princess Royal Coaching Academy, an initiative launched in 2021 by the Riding for the Disabled Association, of which the Princess Royal is Patron. It aims to increase learning opportunities for coaches working with disabled horse riders and carriage drivers in the UK.

From 2013 to 2016, Studzinski was president of the American Friends of The Royal Foundation of The Duke and Duchess of Cambridge and Prince Harry.

In 2024, Studzinski was installed as the next Chancellor of Leeds Trinity University. The university stated that Studzinski's "values and focus on social justice align completely with those of the University." The Chancellor of Leeds Trinity performs a ceremonial role, acting as a key ambassador for the University with one of the key responsibilities being the conferment of degrees at graduation ceremonies.

== Honors ==
- Prince of Wales Ambassador's Award (2000) in recognition of his contribution to the homeless
- Knight of the Order of St. Gregory (2001) by Pope John Paul II for his humanitarian work for the homeless
- Knight Commander of St. Sylvester (2004) by Pope John Paul II for his work promoting ecumenism in Kosovo
- Beacon Prize for Most Generous Business Leader (2004) for services to philanthropy
- Banker of the Year (2007) by the Variety Club UK
- Commander of the Order of the British Empire (CBE) (2008) for his services to the arts and to charity
- Prince of Wales Medal for Arts Philanthropy (2014)
- #10 on The Tablet's Top 100 Lay Catholics of 2015
- UK Montblanc de la Culture Arts Patronage Award (2017) from the Montblanc Cultural Foundation
- Catholic of the Year (2017) by The Catholic Herald

== Personal life ==
Studzinski has residences in London and New York, and divides his time between the two cities. Strongly motivated by his spiritual and religious faith, he has a chapel in his historic London home, and prays and reads books on religion and meditation daily. Holding an extensive art collection, he has been an active buyer and seller of art.
