= Genesis Foundation =

Arts charity in the UK

Genesis Foundation logo

The Genesis Foundation, a UK-registered charity, was established by John Studzinski in 2001. Over the past 25 years, the Foundation has donated more than £23 million to the arts. Through its funding and partnership model, it has enabled opportunities for thousands of young artists, primarily in theatre and music, building both their experience and their resilience. Cross-disciplinary networking and mentoring are inherent to the Genesis Foundation and crucial to its work.

The Foundation's main focus is on partnerships with leading arts organisations such as the Almeida Theatre, National Theatre, Royal Court Theatre, The Sixteen, Jewish Literary Foundation and Royal Academy of Arts.

While largely devoting its regular funding to training programmes that equip emerging artists for life as a creative professional, the Genesis Foundation is also the UK's largest commissioner of sacred music, having commissioned 30 new choral works to date. In 2020, the Genesis Foundation launched the COVID-19 Artists Fund, an emergency response to help freelancers facing hardship, and the £1 million Genesis Kickstart Fund to provide grants for future-facing arts projects across the UK, all employing outstanding freelance creative talent.

== History ==
The Genesis Foundation was founded in January 2001 by investment banker and arts patron John Studzinski, CBE.

Since 2001, the Genesis Foundation has donated more than £23 million to the arts in the UK. Through its funding and partnership model, it has provided opportunities for thousands of young artists, primarily in theatre and music, building both their experience and their resilience.

In 2020, the foundation launched its £1m Genesis Kickstart Fund, designed to enable outstanding freelance artists to stay on their career paths and explore new possibilities in a world radically altered by COVID-19.

== Partner organisations ==
=== National Theatre ===
In 2017 the Genesis Foundation launched a partnership with the National Theatre, collaborating with its artistic director Rufus Norris on the development of new forms of music theatre in the UK. The Genesis Music Theatre Programme is part of the National Theatre's New Work Department and is overseen by Marc Tritschler, who was appointed Creative Director of Music at the NT in 2020.

The latest musical to be developed through the Genesis Music Theatre Programme is The Witches, a musical version of Roald Dahl's timeless tale, which ran in the Olivier Theatre from November 2023 to January 2024. The show was directed by Lyndsey Turner, with book and lyrics by Olivier Award-winner Lucy Kirkwood, and music and lyrics by Tony Award-nominee Dave Malloy. It received 5-star reviews from multiple major broadsheets including The Times, Time Out, and The Independent.

The first musical from the programme to reach the stage was Hex, based on Sleeping Beauty. Hex premiered in the Olivier Theatre in November 2021 and returned to the National Theatre towards the end of 2022.

The Foundation's relationship with Rufus Norris dates back to 2003, when he became the first Genesis Director at the Young Vic.

=== The Sixteen ===
Since 2010, the mainstay of the Genesis Foundation's partnership with leading British choral ensemble The Sixteen has been the Genesis Sixteen programme. Delivered at no charge to participants, it aims to nurture the next generation of talented choral singers and create a bridge between student and professional singing. It provides group tuition, individual mentoring and masterclasses run by vocal experts and is the only scheme of its kind. To date, more than 300 exceptional young singers have taken part of the programme.

The Genesis Foundation commissions new choral pieces from leading and emerging composers, which are premiered by Harry Christophers and The Sixteen and recorded for their label CORO. James MacMillan's Stabat mater, a 60-minute work for choir and string orchestra commissioned by the Genesis Foundation, was given its UK premiere by Harry Christophers, The Sixteen and Britten Sinfonia at the Barbican Centre, London in October 2016. The recording of the work was favourably reviewed and won numerous awards. In April 2018 a performance of the Stabat mater, presented by the Genesis Foundation, became the first concert to be live-streamed from the Sistine Chapel in the Vatican. It subsequently received its US premiere in November 2019 at Lincoln Center's Alice Tully Hall with Harry Christophers and The Sixteen.

In May 2018, four new choral works commissioned by the Genesis Foundation were premiered at a live-streamed concert at Eton College Chapel. The four young composers were mentored by James Macmillan and Harry Christophers and drew on texts from the Eton Choirbook.

Past Genesis commissions include 'Spirit, Strength & Sorrow', three new Stabat Mater pieces by composers Alissa Firsova, Tõnu Kõrvits and Matthew Martin; 'O Guiding Night', music to poetry of the Spanish Mystics St. Teresa of Ávila and St. John of the Cross by Ruth Byrchmore, Tarik O'Regan and Roderick Williams; settings of Padre Pio's Prayer by James MacMillan, Roxanna Panufnik and Will Todd, and Will Todd's Among Angels, commissioned in honour of John Studzinski's 50th birthday.

On 9 February 2016 the Genesis Foundation, in collaboration with the Choral Foundation, hosted a celebration of Vespers at the Chapel Royal, Hampton Court Palace. Cardinal Vincent Nichols and the Dean of the Chapels Royal, Richard Chartres KCVO, officiated at the service and the music was performed by Harry Christophers and The Sixteen. This was the first time since the 1550s that a Vespers service had been celebrated at the chapel according to the Latin Rite of the Catholic Church.

In June 2021, a concert presented by the Genesis Foundation at Farm Street Church in London took its inspiration from the life and writings of Cardinal Newman, who was canonised as Saint John Henry Newman in 2019. Newman: Meditation & Prayer included the world premieres of two new Genesis Foundation commissions, composed by Sir James MacMillan (Nothing in Vain) and Will Todd (I Shall be an Angel of Peace) for Harry Christophers and The Sixteen. Joining the musicians was Classic FM's flagship morning show presenter Alexander Armstrong, reading the words of Cardinal Newman and of the poet and churchman John Donne.

In October 2022, the Genesis Foundation presented 'A Tribute to the Life and Reign of Elizabeth II: A Garland for the Queen', again performed by Harry Christophers and The Sixteen. The concert took place before an invited audience in the Chapel Royal of St Peter ad Vincula at the Tower of London and was streamed online.

Most of the Genesis Foundation's concerts in recent years have reached a wide global audience via live-streams hosted by Classic FM.

In December 2023, the Genesis Foundation commissioned Bob Chilcott to write 'Harry Birthday to Ya', in honour of Harry Christophers' 70th birthday with text by Timothy Knapman, which was performed by The Sixteen.

=== Almeida Theatre ===
The Genesis Foundation's partnership with the Almeida Theatre was inaugurated in 2019 with the Genesis Almeida New Playwrights, Big Plays Programme. This two-year programme, overseen by the theatre's Artistic Director Rupert Goold, supports emerging and mid-career writers in developing new plays for larger stages, providing them with a springboard to expand the scale, scope and ambition of their work and to create plays of wide cultural resonance.

Ava Pickett, who took part in the programme from 2021 to 2022, developed her play 1536 during her time on the cohort, which went on to win the Susan Smith Blackburn Prize and be the first play from the programme to be commissioned. 1536 ran at the Almeida Theatre from May to June 2026 and received 4-star reviews from The Stage, The Guardian, TimeOut, WhatsOnStage, The Independent and The Standard.

In December 2025 it was announced that1536 would transfer to the West End and run at The Ambassadors Theatre from 2 May to 1 August 2026.

=== Royal Court Theatre ===
In October 2025 it was announced that the Genesis Foundation would begin a new partnership with the Royal Court Theatre, supporting a new branch of play commissioning and development.

The new partnership will include annual Genesis Commissions and Genesis Labs in order to support and nurture new writing, including the first commission from the programme in 2026, The Afronauts by Ryan Calais Cameron, which will run at the Royal Court Theatre from 14 November to 19 December 2026.

=== Jewish Literary Foundation ===
In April 2021, the Genesis Foundation and Jewish Literary Foundation (formerly Jewish Book Week) launched a new annual programme to champion emerging writers in the UK.

The Genesis Emerging Writers' Programme offers bursaries and mentorship to 10 emerging writers over 18 years of age, of any background, writing fiction, non-fiction and poetry.

=== Royal Academy of Arts ===
The Genesis Foundation's relationship with the Royal Academy began in 2020 when Rebecca Salter, who was elected the school's first female president at the end of 2019, was awarded the Genesis Foundation Prize for her work in her former role as Keeper of the RA schools.

In 2023, the Genesis Foundation announced its new Genesis Future Curators Programme which provides two two-year curatorial positions at the Royal Academy.

Open to anyone with an arts-related degree, the Genesis Future Curators are placed within the Exhibitions and Collections departments, providing a unique opportunity to gain a 360-degree view of the life of a Curator at the RA.

=== Genesis Theatre Design Programme ===
In December 2022, the Genesis Foundation announced its Genesis Theatre Design Programme, a free training and mentoring programme for global majority applicants who are from socially and economically challenging backgrounds who want to pursue a career in theatre as a designer.

It is a partnership between the Mulberry UTC Creative Industry Training College, the National Theatre, The School of Historical Dress and Brixton House and funded by the Genesis Foundation, National Theatre Foundation, with additional support from the James Family Charitable Trust.

The Genesis Theatre Design Programme is led and delivered by three theatre artists in collaboration with the National Theatre: Gbolahan Obisesan, Sadeysa Greenaway-Bailey and ULTZ.

The first cohort began their training in May 2023 and ended the programme in October 2025.

== £1m Genesis Kickstart Fund ==
The £1m Genesis Kickstart Fund was established in 2020 to enable talented freelance artists to stay on their career paths and explore new possibilities in a world radically altered by COVID-19. The fund, which ran for two years, supported 95 different projects around the UK, involving more than 1000 freelance creative professionals in paid work on projects spanning diverse artistic genres.

Recipients of grants from the Kickstart Fund have gained access to the Genesis Connects Directory, an online platform enabling artists and creative professionals in the Foundation’s network to meet, foster new collaborations and benefit from mentoring opportunities.

== Commissions ==
The Genesis Foundation is the leading commissioner of sacred music in the UK. All dates refer to premiere performances.

=== Sacred Music ===
2026

Sir James MacMillan – Angels Unawares

2025

From a specially commissioned cycle of poems by Robert Willis entitled Angels Unawares:

The Call of Gideon - Ninfea Cruttwell-Reade

The Call of Isaiah - Millicent B. James

The Song of James the Son of Zebede - Lucy Walker

2022

Cecilia McDowall – O Lord, make thy servant, Elizabeth†

2021

Eoghan Desmond – Nothing in vain

Lisa Robertson – ...a link in a chain...

Anna Semple – A Meditation

Sir James MacMillan – Nothing in vain

Will Todd – I Shall Be An Angel of Peace

2020

Sir James MacMillan – Except the Lord build the house

2019

Bob Chilcott – O Lord, thou hast searched me, and known me

Sir James MacMillan – Le grand Inconnu

Angus McPhee – Panem Nostrum... Ave Maria

2018

Phillip Cooke – Ave Maria, Mater Dei

Marco Galvani – Stella caeli

Sir James MacMillan – O virgo prudentissima

Joseph Phibbs – Nesciens Mater

Stephen Hough – Hallowed

2016

Sir James MacMillan – Stabat mater

Will Todd – Whisper Him My Name

2014

Alissa Firsova – Stabat mater

Tõnu Kõrvits – Stabat mater

Matthew Martin – Stabat mater

2011

Ruth Byrchmore – The Dark Night

Ruth Byrchmore – Prayer of St. Teresa of Ávila

Tarik O'Regan – fleeting, God

Tarik O'Regan – Beloved, all things ceased

Roderick Williams – O Guiding Night

Roderick Williams – Let nothing trouble you

2008

Sir James MacMillan – Padre Pio's Prayer

Roxanna Panufnik – Stay with me

Will Todd – Stay with me, Lord

2006

Will Todd – Among Angels

1998

Roxanna Panufnik – Westminster Mass

=== Genesis Opera Project ===
2008

Isidora Žebeljan – The Marathon Family

2006

David Bruce & Anna Reynolds – Push!

Emily Hall & Kit Peel – Sante

2003

Jurgen Simpson & Simon Doyle – Thwaite

Paul Frehner & Angela Murphy – Sirius on Earth

Jonathan Mills & Dorothy Porter – The Eternity Man

Isidora Žebeljan – Zora D

=== Other Commissions ===
2023

Bob Chilcott – Harry Birthday to Ya

2019

Sir James MacMillan – Sing on, Sweet Thrush

2010

Chris Levine – LIGHT

2003

Isidora Žebeljan – Song of a Traveller in the Night, Minstrel's Dance

== Genesis Foundation Prize ==
In 2012 the Genesis Foundation launched the Genesis Foundation Prize, a £25,000 prize awarded to a mentor whose work has effected real change in the practice and careers of arts professionals or graduates. Past recipients include Hamish Dunbar, artistic director of Café Oto; Polly Staple, Director of London's Chisenhale Gallery; Hadrian Garrard, Director of Create London; Joe Robertson and Joe Murphy, artistic directors of Good Chance Theatre;, Rebecca Salter, President of the Royal Academy of Arts, George Turvey, co-founder and artistic director of Papatango Theatre Company. and Nancy Medina, Artistic Director of the Bristol Old Vic Theatre.

In 2025, the prize was awarded to theatre and opera director Joe Hill-Gibbins.

== Previous Partnerships and Projects ==
=== Young Vic ===
The partnership between the Genesis Foundation and the Young Vic Theatre ran from 2003 to 2025.

From 2003 to 2009, the Genesis Foundation funded the Directors Program at the Young Vic, created by the Young Vic's former artistic director David Lan. This programme provided support for professional directors in the early stages of their career. Rufus Norris, former artistic director of the National Theatre, was the first Genesis Director.

As of 2018 the Genesis Foundation funded the two-year Genesis Fellowship and the annual Genesis Future Directors award.

From 2010, seven Genesis Fellows were selected to work closely with the Young Vic's Artistic Director, developing their skills as directors while participating in the theatre's programming and artistic planning. Each Genesis Fellow contributed to the Young Vic's Creators Program and mentors recipients of the Genesis Future Directors Award.

Former Genesis Fellows were: Taio Lawson, Jennifer Tang (Further than the Furthest Thing, 2023), Nadia Latif (Fairview/My England, 2018), Gbolahan Obisesan (Cuttin' It and Sus, 2016), Natalie Abrahami (Wings, Happy Days and Ah, Wilderness!, 2014), Carrie Cracknell (Macbeth co-directed with Lucy Guerin, 2012) and Joe Hill-Gibbins (A Midsummer Night's Dream, Measure for Measure, 2010).

Past recipients of Genesis Future Directors Awards were: Annie Kershaw (Girl in the Machine, 2024), Andrea Ling (The Earthworks, 2024), Diyan Zora (Klippies, 2021), Dadiow Lin (In a Word, 2019), Caitriona Shoobridge (Ivan and the Dogs, 2019), Lekan Lawal (Wild East, 2018),42 Debbie Hannan (Things of Dry Hours, 2018), John R. Wilkinson (Winter, 2017), Nancy Medina (Yellowman, 2017), Lucy J Skilbeck (The Bear and The Proposal, 2016), Bryony Shanahan (Trade, 2016), Ola Ince (Dutchman, 2015), Rikki Henry (Creditors, 2015), Tinuke Craig (Dirty Butterfly, 2014), Finn Beames (Man: Three plays by Tennessee Williams, 2014), Matthew Xia (Sizwe Banzi is Dead, 2013), and Ben Kidd (The Shawl, 2012).

=== LAMDA ===
The partnership between the Genesis Foundation and LAMDA ran for over 20 years.

Dame Janet Suzman, vice-president of LAMDA and a close friend of John Studzinski, was keen to ensure that the arts weren't simply the privilege of the middle-classes and that training should be accessible to all. She encouraged John Studzinski to set up the Genesis LAMDA Scholarships, supporting the academic journey of exceptionally talented students by paying their entire tuition fees over the three-year BA (Hons) course in Professional Acting and also by contributing towards their living expenses.

Over a period of 21 years the Genesis LAMDA scholarships enabled a total of 25 talented students to thrive as they developed the requisite skills and resilience for a substantial career. Among former Genesis LAMDA Scholars are Ben Aldridge, Samuel Barnett, Carys Bowkett, Tom Riley, Abubakar Salim, Amy Stacy and Stuart Thompson. View the full list here.

The Genesis LAMDA network (2017–2020) was conceived as a mentoring programme for actors, stage managers and technicians. Through the programme, final-year students were paired with experienced alumni so that they could acquire additional skills and knowledge to equip them for successful, sustainable careers. Many mentor-mentee relationships have developed into friendships beyond the official network.

=== Royal Court Theatre ===
John Studzinski, and subsequently the Genesis Foundation, supported the Royal Court Theatre's International Playwrights' programme for over 20 years. This partnership enabled over 300 writers from more than 70 countries, working in over 40 languages, to have their work read, developed and directed by the Royal Court Theatre's International team, headed by the late Elyse Dodgson.

=== Older Projects ===
In 2001, the Genesis Foundation was inaugurated with the Genesis Opera Project. A collaboration with Aldeburgh and the Almeida Theatre, the initiative championed the writing of new one-act operas. The Foundation subsequently supported OperaGenesis at the Royal Opera House and scholarships at Welsh National Opera, among many others.

== Exhibitions ==
=== Bill Viola / Michelangelo: Life, Death, Rebirth at the Royal Academy of Arts ===
The Genesis Foundation sponsored the Royal Academy of Arts' major exhibition, Bill Viola / Michelangelo: Life, Death, Rebirth, which ran from 26 January to 31 March 2019. The exhibition paired installations by pioneering video artist Bill Viola with rarely seen drawings by Michelangelo, exploring how these artists shared a deep preoccupation with the nature of human experience and existence, despite working five centuries apart and in radically different media. This was the first time that these artists' works had been seen together.

=== Living with gods: peoples, places and worlds beyond at the British Museum ===
The Genesis Foundation was the sole sponsor of a major new exhibition Living with gods: peoples, places and worlds beyond at the British Museum, which ran from 2 November 2017 to 8 April 2018 and examined the practice and expression of religious beliefs in the lives of individuals and communities across the world.
