= Bernard Rose (musician) =

British organist and composer (1916–1996)

Bernard Rose OBE FRCO
- Born: Bernard William George Rose; 9 May 1916; Sawbridgeworth, England
- Died: 21 November 1996 (aged 80); Bampton, Oxfordshire, England
- Occupations: Organist, music tutor
- Era: 20th-century music
- Known for: Anglican church music
- Spouse: Molly Marshall (m. 1939)
- Children: 3, including Gregory

Bernard William George Rose OBE FRCO (9 May 1916 – 21 November 1996) was a British organist, soldier, composer, and academic.

A graduate of Cambridge University, he is best known for his compositions of Anglican church music; his Preces and Responses, for use in the Anglican services of Mattins and Evensong, is widely performed. He served as a soldier in the Second World War, and went on to become a noted choir master and music tutor, counting among his pupils the composer Kenneth Leighton, musicians Professor Roger Bray, Professor David Wulstan and Harry Christophers, and actor Dudley Moore.

== Education ==
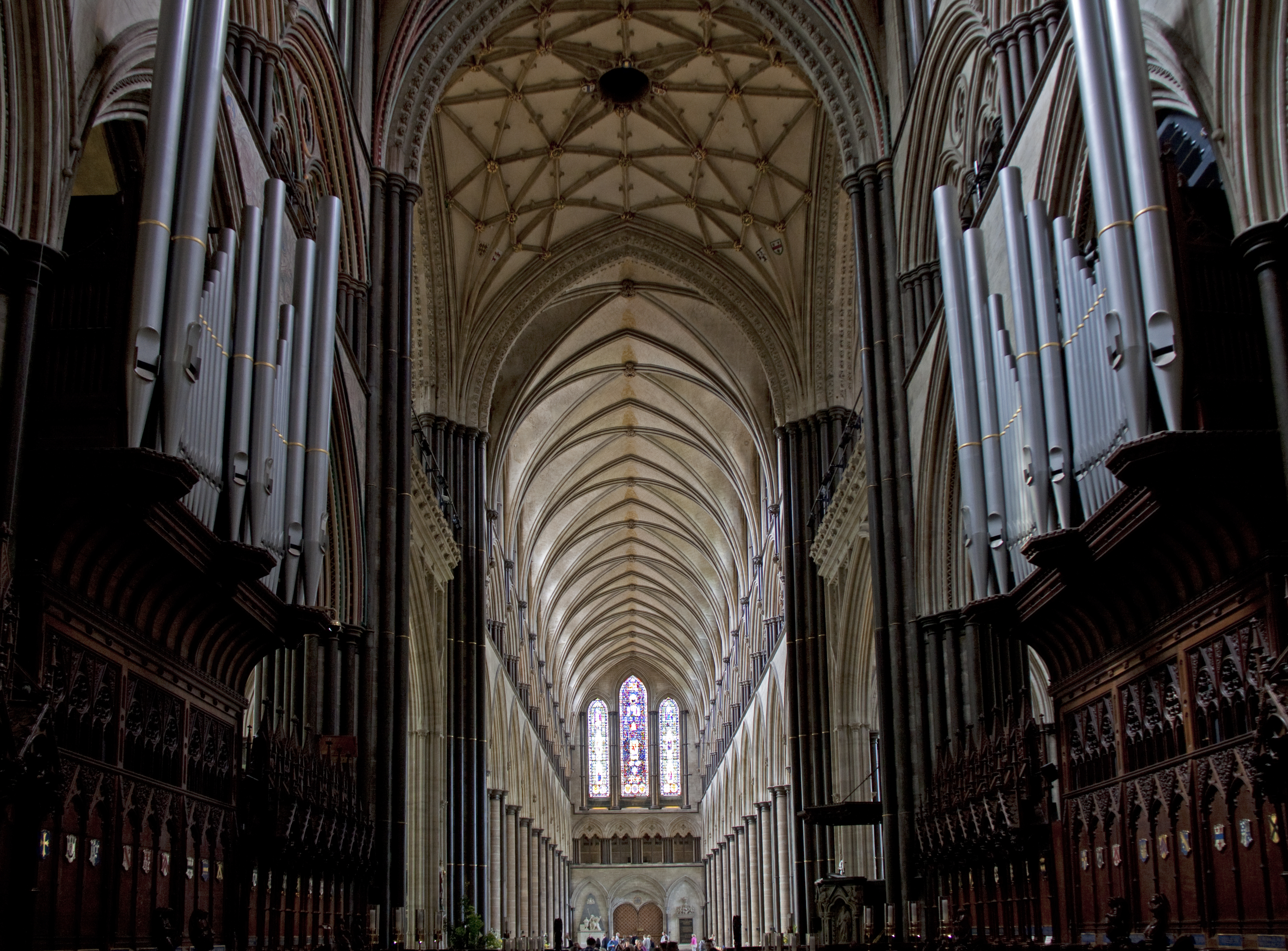
Salisbury Cathedral Organ, where Rose began his musical studies

Bernard Rose was at Salisbury Cathedral School and sang as a chorister at Salisbury Cathedral from 1925 to 1931. There, he also studied the organ under Walter Galpin Alcock and was appointed as an assistant organist at the cathedral aged just 15. From 1933 to 1935, Rose studied at the Royal College of Music where he continued his organ studies under Alcock. In 1935, he won the organ scholarship to St Catharine's College, Cambridge, beating Edward Heath to the position. At Cambridge, Rose studied under Hubert Middleton and Edward Joseph Dent from 1935 to 1939.

== Career ==
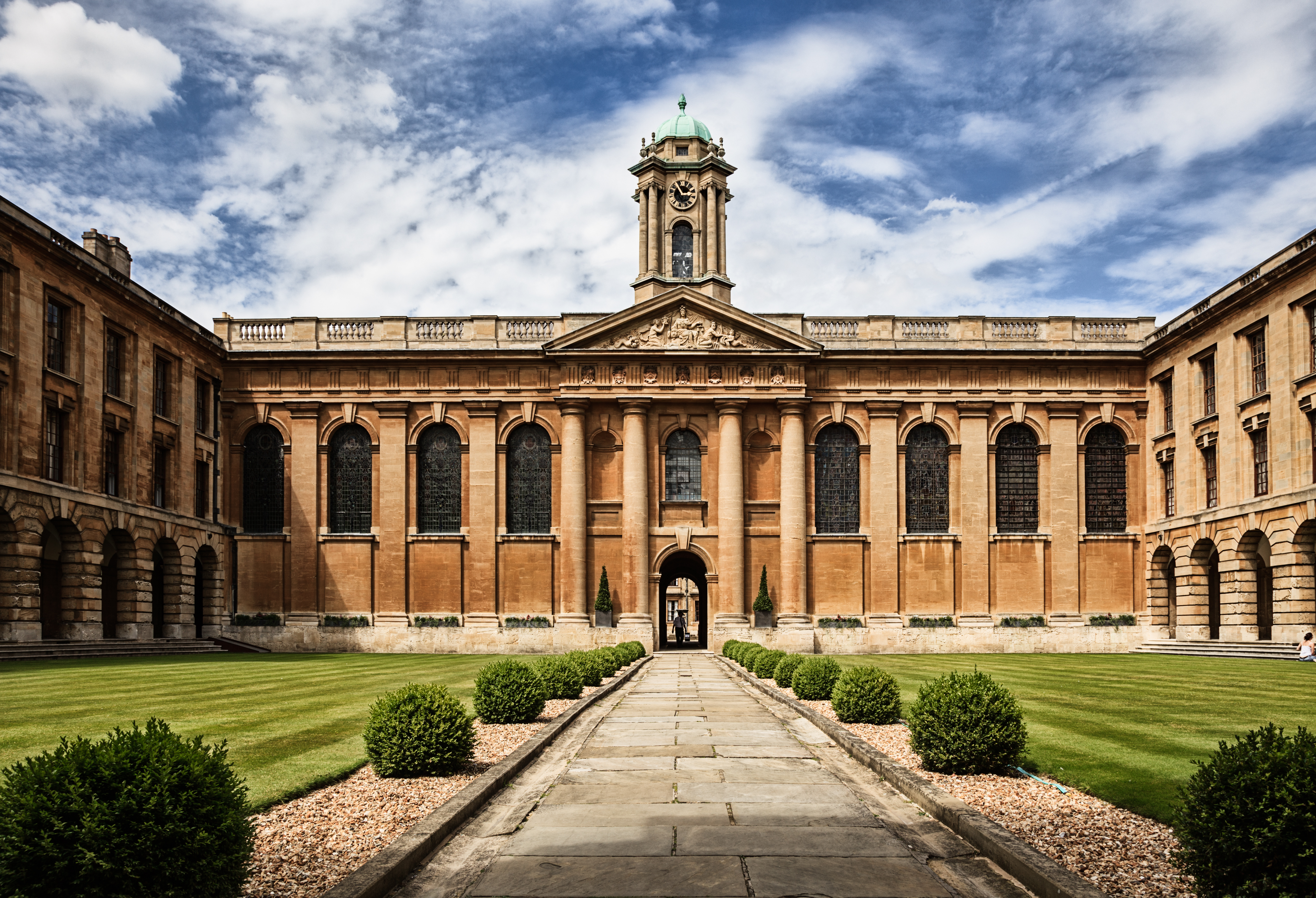
The Queen's College, Oxford

Rose started his academic career at The Queen's College, Oxford. As Rose began his position as a tutor in music, organist of The Queen's College, Oxford, and conductor of the Eglesfield Music Society, the Second World War was declared. With the war having just begun, Rose married his fiancée, Molly Marshall, at Christmas 1939.

=== Military service ===
Rose volunteered and was seen by an army selection board and called up in September 1940, after which he underwent officer training. He was commissioned as a second lieutenant in 2nd Northamptonshire Yeomanry on 26 January 1941. He saw action in the North African and Italian campaigns as a "Desert Rat" with the 4th County of London Yeomanry (Sharpshooters), and took part in the Normandy landings on 6 June 1944. A week later, Molly was informed that Bernard has been killed in action; in fact he had been captured on 13 June 1944 during the Battle of Villers-Bocage in Normandy, as she later learned. Bernard spent the remainder of the war at Oflag 79, a German POW camp near Brunswick, Lower Saxony, until the Ninth United States Army released him and his colleagues on 12 April 1945. He left the army with the rank of captain.

Molly Rose also saw service during the war, piloting Spitfires, Wellington bombers, Hawker Typhoon and Tempest fighter-bombers in the Air Transport Auxiliary.

=== Post-war career ===
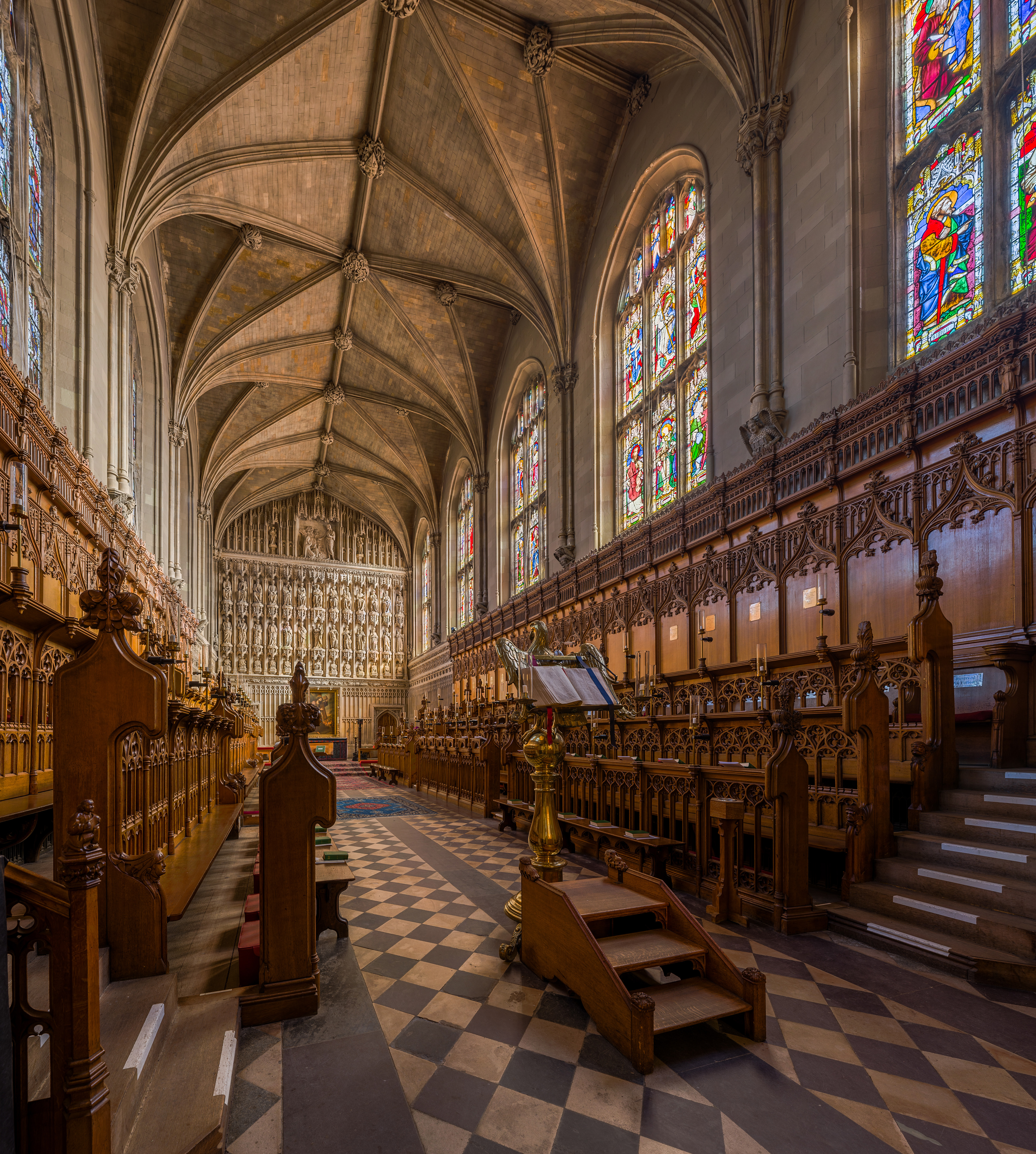
Magdalen College Chapel, where Rose was a choirmaster

After the war, Rose resumed his academic teaching role at The Queen's College in 1945, and remained there until he was appointed Informator Choristarum (organist and master of the choristers) at Magdalen College (1957–1981). Rose became a sought-after tutor, particularly for harmony and counterpoint and a distinguished choir master. His pupils included Kenneth Leighton, Dudley Moore, Harry Christophers of The Sixteen and his son, Gregory Rose. His special study of the choral music of Thomas Tomkins was published in Musica Deo Sacra; another major work was his editing of Handel's oratorio Susanna (Kassel 1967). Former choristers inspired by his leadership include Daniel Sandford, John La Bouchardière and Jonathan Powell.

In 1952, Rose conducted the premiere of An Oxford Elegy by Ralph Vaughan Williams. Rose introduced Kenneth Leighton to the composer Gerald Finzi in the late 1940s, and the two developed a close friendship and artistic association. After Finzi's death, Leighton dedicated his Veris Gratia Suite, Op. 9 to his friend, and the choral version was conducted in Oxford by Bernard Rose in 1956. For ten years from 1957 he was president of the City of Oxford Silver Band, which he also conducted.

Rose served as Vice-President of Magdalen College, Oxford, from 1973 to 1975, and was an Emeritus Fellow 1981–1996. He was president of the Royal College of Organists from 1974 to 1976.

== Honours ==
Rose was appointed Officer of the Order of the British Empire (OBE) in the 1980 New Year Honours for services to music. His wife Molly, who survived him, featured in seminars and television programmes concerning the role of women pilots delivering aircraft to the front line.

== Legacy ==
Bernard Rose's dedication to high quality choral singing at Magdalen Chapel was highly influential. He is said to have inspired some of Britain's leading choirs, including the Clerkes of Oxenford, The Sixteen, The Tallis Scholars and Ex Cathedra.

In 2010, Bernard Rose's son Graham discovered old tape recordings of performances of Magdalen College Choir conducted by his father, dating from 1960 to 1976. The recordings were remastered and released on audio CD in 2015 by OxRecs DIGITAL to commemorate the centenary of Rose's birth.

As of 2020 a feature film entitled Attagirls is in development based on the wartime lives of Molly and Bernard, written by Paul Olavesen-Stabb. A book adapted from the screenplay is planned to be published on 1 August 2021. A scholarship has been established in conjunction with Attagirls, the Molly Rose Pilot Scholarship, which aims to encourage young women to consider a career as a pilot.

== Selected original works ==
- Slow, slow fresh fount (Ben Jonson)
- Symphony in A minor
- Praise ye the Lord (Psalm 149)
- Lord, I have loved the habitation (Psalm 126)
- Preces and Responses (2 sets)
- According to his promise (2 Peter 3:13)
- Evening Canticles (3 sets)
- Our blessed lady's lullaby (Richard Verstegan)
- Three Introits
- Catharine (Oratorio)
- Missa vocae choristarum
- Chimes (for organ)
- Feast Song for Saint Cecilia (Gregory Rose)
- Three Addison Anthems
- O Praise God in his holiness (Psalm 150)
- Surely thou hast tasted (St Peter)
- Lift up your heads (Psalm 24)
- Tongue and Air (John Fuller)
- Seven Epitaphs (Sir Walter Raleigh)
- Praise ye the Lord (Psalm 113)
- Almighty God, who art the Giver of all Wisdom (Samuel Johnson)
- Carol: The Christ Child (G.K.Chesterton)
- A Magdalen Mass
- Upon Westminster Bridge (Wordsworth)
- If I could tell you (W.H.Auden)

Publishers: Novello, Oxford University Press, Addington Press, Minster Music, EECM, Cathedral Music, HHA
