= Alan Bullard =

British composer

- Born: 4 August 1947 (age 79); Norwood, South London
- Occupation: Composer
- Notable work: choral and educational music

Alan Bullard (born 4 August 1947) is a British composer, known mainly for his choral and educational music. His compositions are regularly performed and broadcast worldwide, and they appear on a number of CDs.

== Early career and education ==
He was born in Norwood, South London on 4 August 1947, son of artists Paul Bullard and Jeanne Bullard, and lived as a child in Blackheath, South-east London. He attended St. Olave's Grammar School, where he learnt music with Desmond Swinburn, while studying piano with Geoffrey Flowers and John Allen at the Blackheath Conservatoire of Music. He then studied with Herbert Howells, Ruth Gipps and Antony Hopkins at the Royal College of Music, and took postgraduate study with Arnold Whittall at the University of Nottingham. For the next few years he taught music part-time in several art schools and at the London College of Music (from 1970 to 1975).

Apart from a short song written in 1967 when he was a student of Herbert Howells, the earliest work that Alan Bullard now acknowledges is his Three Poems of W B Yeats of 1973. This work, and a cluster of other choral works, (several of which found publishers such as Banks and the RSCM) written at about the same time, are almost the only pieces to survive this period.

== Professional career ==
The opportunity of a permanent teaching post at what is now Colchester Institute (where Bullard taught from 1975 to 2005) caused a move to the Essex countryside, and later to Colchester. His pupils at the Institute included Christopher Wright. Here encouragement by several colleagues and friends resulted in a growing musical confidence and output: for example Colchester Choral Society (director Ian Ray) commissioned three large-scale works for choir and orchestra.

In 1985 Bullard wrote a setting for unaccompanied choir of four sixteenth-century poems entitled Madrigal Book. This work came to the attention of Stephen Wilkinson and was the beginning of a long association with Alan Bullard's choral music, resulting in several broadcasts by the BBC Northern Singers.

Meanwhile, his work in the area of choral music for amateurs attracted the interest of Oxford University Press, and there is now in their catalogue a wide variety of Bullard’s anthems and carols for different choral groupings and situations, many of which are performed worldwide.

Many of Bullard’s orchestral pieces found first performances in East Anglia, often under the baton of Christopher Phelps. Bullard has also written much chamber music for many instrumental combinations and his music for wind groups, in particular, has found particular favour, as has his music for the recorder, an instrument he enjoys playing as an amateur.

Bullard has also written much music for children and adult learners: he is a contributor to many instrumental collections and is the composer of Joining the Dots (ABRSM) an ongoing series to develop musical sight-reading, and the editor and author, with his wife Janet, of the Pianoworks piano tutor series published by Oxford University Press. Bullard claims to find ‘the writing of an interesting Grade One piece as exciting as any other musical challenge’.

== Awards ==
In 2008 Bullard was awarded an honorary Doctorate by the University of Essex for his work in composition and education, and in 2010 he received three awards from the Music Industries Association (MIA) for his publications in that year.

== Musical language and reception ==
Bullard acknowledges the influence of twentieth-century composers such as Benjamin Britten and Herbert Howells on his musical language, as well as that of mediaeval and renaissance music. Writers have described his music as ‘gentle, melodic, and unfailingly well-crafted’, and showing ‘a real sense of pianistic understanding, economical and linear without sounding clichéd’. Another critic has said ‘Bullard's music shows a genuine love for melodic contours and a delicate shading of a harmonic language that is respectful of tradition without being a slave to it’. Of his Christmas carols, writers have said that ‘Bullard's direct tuneful language draws its chief source of inspiration from the eloquent simplicity of folk-carols’ and that ‘he shows a sensitivity to the text, and vocal lines that show a natural easy flow’ and found his carol ‘Glory to the Christ-Child’ to be a ‘rigorous and exhilarating setting of mediaeval lyrics’. And educational material such as Pianoworks (with his wife Janet as co-writer) has been welcomed as ‘attractive, unpatronising and adult in manner’.

What seems to please Bullard most is to write music which performers enjoy playing and audiences enjoy hearing: music which might provide something of a challenge, but which is not out of reach. As one critic put it: ‘He sees his role as quietly getting on with the vocation of writing music that people will want to sing and play on the everyday, as well as the special occasion’.

== Personal life ==
Alan Bullard is married to Janet Bullard (nee Dakin), a piano teacher and singer. They live in Colchester, Essex and Friston, Suffolk, and they have two children and five grandchildren.

== Main publishers ==
- ABRSM
- Oxford University Press
- Forsyth Brothers Ltd
- Colne Edition

== Selected list of compositions ==
=== Choral ===
- Dance of the Universe (1979)
- Madrigal Book (1985)
- Canticle of Freedom (1999)
- A Summer Garland (2002)
- A Feast for Christmas (2007)
- Pictures of Night (2008)
- Dover Te Deum (2009)
- Wondrous Cross (2011)
- Magnificat and Nunc Dimittis (Selwyn Service) (2012)
- O Come, Emmanuel (2013)
- A Light in the Stable (2014)
- Psalmi Penitentiales (2016)
- Images of Peace (2018)
- Endless Song (2023)

==== Collections ====
- Alan Bullard Anthems
- Alan Bullard Carols
- The Oxford Book of Flexible Anthems
- The Oxford Book of Flexible Carols
- The Oxford Book of Easy Flexible Anthems
- The Oxford Book of Flexible Choral Songs

=== Vocal ===
- The Sea of Faith (1995)
- The Solitary Reaper (1995)
- A Swan, a Man (2009)

=== Instrumental ===
- Dances for Wind Quintet (1982)
- Three Diversions for descant or tenor recorder and piano or harpsichord (1983 Forsyth)
- Overtones – clarinet quartet (1985)
- String Quartet no. 1 (1989)
- Recipes for descant recorder and optional piano or guitar, or string orchestra/quartet (1989 Forsyth)
- Attitudes – solo guitar (1991)
- Olympian Sketches – clarinet quartet (1993)
- Three Picasso Portraits – saxophone quartet (1992)
- Galloway Sketches – homage to Walter Carroll for recorder (treble doubling descant and optional garklein) and piano or guitar (1995 Forsyth)
- Spring Pictures – violin and piano (1996)
- Winter Variations – cello and piano (1998)
- Cyclic Harmony – clarinet or saxophone choir (1998)
- Hat Box for recorder and piano or guitar (2003 Forsyth)
- Large White Rock – chamber ensemble (2004)
- String Quartet no. 2 (2006)
- North Sea Sketches – recorder ensemble (2010)
- Journey through Time – woodwind orchestra (2010)

=== Orchestral ===
- Fanfares for orchestra (1985)
- Sinfonietta for brass, percussion and strings (1987)
- Aztec Genesis – full orchestra (2000)
- Recorder Concerto (2010)
- Hark to the Bells (2012)

=== Educational ===
- Fifty for Flute (1995)
- Lunar Landscapes for cello (1995)
- World Atlas for piano (1996)
- Sixty for Sax (2005)

==== Series ====
- Party Time (1996–8)
- Circus Skills (2001–2)
- Pianoworks (2007–)
- Joining the Dots (2010–)

== Selected list of choirs, performers, and conductors of Bullard's music ==
=== Selected choirs ===
- BBC Northern Singers
- BBC Singers
- Chapel Choir of Selwyn College Cambridge
- Choir of Christ Church Cathedral, Montreal
- Choir of Coventry Cathedral
- Choir of Ely Cathedral
- Choir of Kings College Cambridge
- Choir of St John's College Cambridge
- Colchester Choral Society
- Elysian Singers
- Fairhaven Singers
- Ionian Singers
- Joyful Company of Singers
- Reading Phoenix Choir
- St Michael's Singers
- The Allegri Singers
- The Sixteen
- Vasari Singers
- VocalEssence, Minneapolis
- Waltham Singers
- William Byrd Singers of Manchester
- Wooburn Singers

=== Selected performers ===
- Anna Tillbrook
- Beth Spendlove
- Christian Forshaw
- Colin Baldy
- Daniel Grimwood
- Huw Watkins
- Ian Mitchell
- James Oxley
- Jamie Walton
- Joby Burgess
- John Turner
- Lindsay Gowers
- Nigel Clayton
- Maria Jette
- Nancy Ruffer
- Sarah Burnett
- Sarah Leonard
- Sarah Watts
- Susie Allan
- William Coleman

=== Selected orchestras and ensembles ===
- Bloomsbury Woodwind Ensemble
- Bournemouth Symphony Orchestra
- British Clarinet Ensemble
- Chinook Clarinet Quartet
- Composers Ensemble
- Ebony Quartet
- Farnaby Brass
- Gemini
- Georgian String Quartet
- Langdon Chamber Players
- Quince String Quartet
- Royal Ballet Sinfonia
- Saxology

=== Selected conductors ===
- Aidan Oliver
- Andrew Massey
- Andrew Nethsinga
- Bob Chilcott
- Charles Hine
- Christopher Phelps
- Elgar Howarth
- Geoff Harniess
- Graham Ross
- Gwyn Arch
- Harry Christophers
- Ian Ray
- Jeremy Backhouse
- John Wallace
- Michael Finnissy
- Michael Nicholas
- Paul Leddington Wright
- Philip Brunelle
- Roderick Earle
- Sarah MacDonald
- Shea Lolin
- Stephen Cleobury
- Stephen Wilkinson
- Ralph Woodward
- Timothy Salter
