= Sacred Music (TV series) =

British television series

- Season 1 title card
- Genre: Documentary
- Directed by: Simon Broughton; Andy King-Dabbs
- Presented by: Simon Russell Beale
- No. of seasons: 2
- No. of episodes: 14

Production
- Executive producers: Andy King-Dabbs (2008-present); Helen Mansfield (2015)
- Production companies: BBC; The Open University

Original release
- Network: BBC Four (2008-2015); BBC Two (2015-present); BBC iPlayer (2008-2016)
- Release: March 21, 2008

Sacred Music is a documentary series broadcast on BBC Four and BBC Two from 2008. Presented by actor and former chorister Simon Russell Beale, it is produced in conjunction with The Open University and features performances and interviews by Harry Christophers and his choir, The Sixteen.

== Regular episodes ==
=== Series 1 ===
| Episode | Title | Summary | First Broadcast |
|---|---|---|---|
| 1 | The Gothic Revolution | Filming locations included Notre-Dame Cathedral, the Basilica of Saint Denis, the Sainte-Chapelle, and Laon Cathedral. | 21 Mar 2008 |
| 2 | Palestrina and the Popes | This episode was filmed on location in Italy (in Rome and Palestrina), and at St Peter's Italian Church, London and St Columba's Catholic Church, Glasgow. | 28 Mar 2008 |
| 3 | Tallis, Byrd and the Tudors | Filming locations included Waltham Abbey Church, Ingatestone Hall, Stondon Massey, St James's Palace, St Alfege Church, Greenwich, Winchester Cathedral and Lincoln Cathedral. | 4 Apr 2008 |
| 4 | Bach and the Lutheran Legacy | This episode was filmed on location in Eisenach, Germany and Rome, Italy, and at the Bach Church, Arnstadt, St. Mary's Church, Lübeck, St George's German Lutheran Church. | 11 Apr 2008 |

=== Series 2 ===
| Episode | Title | Summary | First Broadcast |
|---|---|---|---|
| 1 | Brahms and Bruckner | | 12 Mar 2010 |
| 2 | Fauré and Poulenc | | 19 Mar 2010 |
| 3 | Górecki and Pärt | Filmed in Estonia and Poland, the episode involved an interview with the Estonian composer Arvo Pärt | 26 Mar 2010 |
| 4 | Searching Out the Sacred | | 2 Apr 2010 |

== Specials ==
| Title | | Summary | First Broadcast |
|---|---|---|---|
| An Easter Celebration | | A 90-minute concert which was recorded at St Luke Old Street, containing music from the first series. | 23 Mar 2008 |
| The Story of Allegri's Miserere | | A 30-minute episode, detailing the history and performance of the Miserere, and including a full performance. | 21 Dec 2008 |
| Sacred Music at Christmas | A Christmas History | Simon Russell Beale explores the history of Christmas music on location in Europe. | 24 Dec 2010 |
| Sacred Music at Christmas | A Choral Christmas | A 30-minute concert of Christmas choral music, including some of the works featured in the preceding documentary. Recorded at St Augustine's, Kilburn | 24 Dec 2010 |
| God's Composer | | Commemorating the 400th anniversary of the Spanish Renaissance composer Tomás Luis de Victoria's death. | 2 Dec 2011 |
| Monteverdi in Mantua: The Genius of the Vespers | | On location in Italy, Simon Russell Beale examines the relationship between Vincenzo Gonzaga, Duke of Mantua and his court composer Claudio Monteverdi, exploring the world from which Monteverdi's Vespers of 1610 was borne out. | 4 Apr 2015 |

== Release and reception ==
Sacred Music was generally well received by critics with a review by Andrew Stewart in Choir & Organ magazine describing the show as "an effective antidote" to "idea-lite television documentaries". An article by Tom Service in The Guardian further described the show's second series as having "a paradoxical place in today's popular culture" whilst showing "us why sacred music still matters". Whilst a review of the show's second season by James Walton at The Telegraph described the season's first two episodes as "every bit as good as the first [season]".

=== Home media ===
Most episodes have been released on DVD under The Sixteen's own label, Coro.
