= Molly Rose =

British aviator

Molly Rose OBE DL JP
- Born: Molly Daphne Marshall; 26 November 1920; Cambridge, England
- Died: 16 October 2016 (aged 95); Cupar, Fife, Scotland
- Resting place: St Mary's Church, Bampton
- Spouse: Bernard Rose (m. 1939; died 1996)
- Children: 3, including Gregory
- Family: Arthur Marshall (brother)
- Awards: 1983 Deputy Lieutenant for Oxfordshire: 1990 OBE for Services to Oxfordshire

Molly Daphne Rose, OBE, DL, JP (née Marshall; 26 November 1920 – 16 October 2016) was a British aviator who flew for the Air Transport Auxiliary in World War II and later served as a magistrate in Oxfordshire.

== Early life ==
Molly Rose was born on 26 November 1920 in Cambridge, England. Her parents were David and Maude Marshall. Her father formed Marshall Motor Holdings and Marshall Aerospace and Defence Group. She had two older brothers, Arthur Marshall (b. 4 December 1903) and Ronald (b. 20 March 1906). Ronald died of meningitis in June 1907. With four older and one younger sister she was brought up in quite a lively household. Margery (b. 1908), Dorothy (b. 1910), Violet (b. 1913), Mary (b. 1916) and Brenda (b. 1927). Her mother, Maude, died in 1930 when Molly was ten years old and she and Brenda were, to all intents and purposes, brought up by their older sister Vi.

After schooling at Paston House and then Slepe Hall, St Ives, in 1938 Molly was sent to Paris to a finishing school – that of Mademoiselle Le Dieux at 8 Avenue de Villaire – from January to June. Having enjoyed flying as a passenger in her brother Arthur's de Havilland Gipsy Moth, she took up flying and, in 1938, was awarded a pilot's licence. Her father David Gregory Marshall (otherwise known as "DGM") had, by this time, developed the Marshall Motors business he set up in 1909 and her brother, Arthur, the Cambridge Flying School. On returning from Paris Molly's father suggested she became an apprentice engineer and she worked in the hangars of the family business until called up by the Air Transport Auxiliary.

== Career ==
Rose joined the Air Transport Auxiliary on 16 September 1942 and delivered 486 aircraft during World War II, 38 different types of aircraft including 276 Spitfires. After the war, she raised three sons with her husband Bernard and became a Justice of the Peace in Oxford in 1952. She was active raising funds for various charities in Oxfordshire, was appointed a Deputy Lieutenant for Oxfordshire in 1983 and was awarded the OBE for Services to Oxfordshire in 1990. Molly also served as a Parish Councillor in the village of Appleton in Oxfordshire.

== Later life ==
Molly and Bernard lived in Bampton, Oxfordshire, from 1946 until 1974, when they moved to live in Appleton Manor. In 1986 they moved back to Bampton to live in Bampton House. She died on 16 October 2016 at the age of 95. In 2018 the Molly Rose Trophy was created and is awarded each year to the winner of the armed forces women's rugby match held at Twickenham.

== Personal life ==
Molly married Bernard Rose in Hove Parish Church on 19 December 1939. Bernard died of emphysema in November 1996.

== Legacy ==
In 2020 Aetheris Film Company owner, Paul Olavesen-Stabb, decided that, with the declaration of lockdown in the UK during the action to slow down the spread of Coronavirus, he would turn the film script, already written but with no filming possible, into a book. Entitled Attagirls it was published in August 2021 see https://www.aetheris.co.uk/ Additionally Paul Olavesen-Stabb also decided to launch the Molly Rose Pilot Scholarship, which offers a fully funded training package up to Private Pilot Licence level. Over 40 applications were received from young women from all backgrounds and the successful candidate will be trained at the Cambridge Aero Club in the summer of 2022. The club is based at Cambridge Airfield owned by Marshall Group of Cambridge - the airfield where Molly learnt to fly in 1938.

Molly recorded her lifetime experiences for the Imperial War Museum and these can be heard by going to https://www.iwm.org.uk/collections/item/object/80009749
