= Gregory Rose (musician) =

Peter Gregory Rose (born 18 April 1948) is a conductor, composer, arranger, and music director. He has conducted orchestral, choral and ensemble premieres throughout Europe and the Far East.

== Musical education and training ==
Gregory Rose studied violin, piano and singing as a young child and was a pupil of Hanns Jelinek (Vienna Academy) and Egon Wellesz (Oxford University), both former students of Arnold Schoenberg, and of his father, Bernard Rose.

== Conductor ==
=== Choral ===
Rose's conducting repertoire ranges from Pérotin (of the Notre Dame school) to premieres which have included his own works. He began conducting choirs whilst a student at Magdalen College, Oxford, where he was an 'Academical Clerk' (Choral scholar) under the direction of his father, the conductor, composer, scholar and teacher, Bernard Rose. Since then, his choral conducting has included concerts and recordings with Europe's finest choirs, including the Groupe Vocal de France, the BBC Singers, the Netherlands Radio Choir, the Netherlands Kamerkoor, the Westdeutscher Rundfunkchor (West German Radio Chorus) and the Estonian Philharmonic Chamber Choir. He has conducted many a cappella programmes, including all-Russian works for the Netherland Radio Choir and the BBC Singers, and a programme of Janáček and Liszt with the Estonian Philharmonic Chamber Choir.

=== Opera ===
In the 1990s he was Chorus Master at the Wexford International Opera Festival in Ireland. Since then he has conducted many operas, including the British stage premieres of Scott Joplin's Treemonisha, Berthold Goldschmidt's Beatrice Cenci, Vision of Lear by Toshio Hosokawa and "Syllable" by Ed Jessen.

He has conducted operas by Bizet, Poulenc, Stravinsky, Scott Joplin, Virgil Thomson, Berthold Goldschmidt, Samuel Barber, Nino Rota, Gian Carlo Menotti, Malcolm Williamson and Toshio Hosokawa.

=== Orchestral ===
Following his appointment as conductor to various choirs, including the Reading Festival Chorus and London Concert Choir, he began to conduct orchestras, particularly in Scandinavia, the Baltic states, Poland, Russia and Sri Lanka.

Rose has conducted the St Petersburg Symphony Orchestra (Russia), the Finnish Radio Symphony Orchestra, The Polish National Radio Symphony Orchestra and London Philharmonic Orchestra, the National Symphony Orchestras of Estonia, Latvia, Lithuania and Ireland, and the Tapiola Sinfonietta.

In the 1980s he formed his own professional chamber orchestra, Jupiter Orchestra, with whom he has appeared at concerts, featuring contemporary composition, in London and the Provinces. In 1999 he was appointed conductor of the pioneering CoMA London Ensemble and he has conducted numerous premieres with the ensemble at concerts in London and at many festivals, including the Spitalfields, Huddersfield and Canterbury's Sounds New Festivals. Recently the ensemble made its debut in Maastricht, the Netherlands.

Highlights of his conducting career include conducting the St Petersburg Symphony Orchestra in the Philharmonic Hall, the Baltic premieres of Nielsen's Symphonies Nos. 4 & 5, the Baltic premiere of Elgar's Dream of Gerontius, recording with the Finnish Radio Symphony Orchestra, a performance of Rachmaninoff's The Bells in the Royal Festival Hall, London and recording with the National Polish Radio Orchestra in Katowice. In March 2009 a performance of Verdi's Requiem that he conducted with the Symphony Orchestra of Sri Lanka attracted an audience of 2,000 people.

== Composer ==
Rose has composed works for orchestra, including Tapiola Sunrise, Birthday Ode for Aaron Copland, Cristalflood and Thambapani, as well as for chorus. His Missa Sancta Pauli Apostoli won the liturgical section of the British Composer Awards 2006 . His large-scale music-theatre work, Danse macabre, was premiered in Tallinn, Estonia in October 2011. He is a specialist in the music of Johann Nepomuk Hummel, having completed his Violin Concerto, which he recorded on the Naxos label with Aleksandr Trostiansky and the Russian Philharmonic Orchestra. He has worked closely with composers such as Karlheinz Stockhausen, John Cage, Steve Reich, Christian Wolff and Stephen Montague, and has appeared in festivals throughout Europe, including two BBC Promenade concerts with Singcircle. He has recorded for many international television and radio stations, and has made recordings for Chandos, Hyperion, Wergo, Continuum and October Music.

As a composer, Rose's works mainly cover the orchestral, choral and chamber repertoires and his works have been published by Boosey & Hawkes, Oxford University Press, Novello and Colla Voce. His orchestral works include Tapiola Sunrise, Birthday Ode for Aaron Copland, Cristalflood and Thambapani. In the choral field he has composed 5 sets of Evening Canticles and 10 masses, including his Missa Sancta Pauli Apostoli, which won the liturgical section of the British Composer Awards 2006. Other masses include Missa Sancti Dunstani and Missa Sancta Beornwaldi. His large-scale music-theatre work, Danse macabre was premiered in Tallinn, Estonia in October 2011 in front of an audience of around 1,000 by the Estonian Philharmonic Chamber Choir and instrumentalists. His Violin Concerto received its premiere with Peter Sheppard Skærved as soloist at his 70th Birthday concert in London in April 2018, and has been recorded. Future works include an opera called The Dream Seller.

== Arranger ==
Rose made orchestral arrangements on 5 tracks for Linda Ronstadt on her Heart Like A Wheel album, including the best selling single You're No Good. He arranged a couple of tracks for Deaf School, including Taxi and the Madness single Night Boat To Cairo. More recently he arranged and conducted on Diana Ross's I Love You album.

In the classical field he completed the Violin Concerto by Beethoven's contemporary Johann Nepomuk Hummel, the premiere of which he conducted in St John's, Smith Square, London in June 1998, with Jaakko Kusisto and the Jupiter Orchestra. It is published by Artaria Editions, Wellington, New Zealand. Rose conducted the work on a Naxos CD with Alexander Trostiansky and the Russian Philharmonic Orchestra in Moscow.

== Director ==
In 1977, Gregory Rose directed Singcircle in a performance of Stockhausen's Stimmung at the Round House – the first performances of the work outside the original ensemble, the Collegium Vocales of Cologne. Subsequently Singcircle made a recording of that performance on the Hyperion Label. In 1978, they performed at the BBC Promenade concerts in the Royal Albert Hall. In 1985, Singcircle performed this work at the Barbican Centre with Karlheinz Stockhausen himself at the mixing desk. Rose has directed Singcircle in over 50 performances of Stockhausen's Stimmung throughout Europe. A BBC film about the work featuring Singcircle, 'Tuning In', was made in the 1980s.

Rose was director of the CAGE AT 70 concerts, the Almeida Festival in 1982, during which time he made a film about Cage with Peter Greenaway for Channel 4, as part of the Four Composers series of films. In 1984 he directed another Almeida Festival series of concerts for Steve Reich's 50th birthday, REICH AT 50 and subsequently conducted several Reich works in collaboration with the composer, including performances of Tehillim. He was also Music Director for two of international designer Hussein Chalayan's London shows.

Rose is currently the music director of the Jupiter Orchestra, Jupiter Singers and Singcircle.

== Teacher ==
Gregory Rose is a professor of conducting and a staff conductor at Trinity Laban Conservatoire of Music and Dance.

== Compositions ==
- Everlasting Mary (SATB carol, 1969) [Boosey & Hawkes]
- Vespers for Mary Magdalen (SATB, 1970) [Novello]
- Colours (1970)
- God's Strange Ways (SATB, 1971) [Boosey & Hawkes]
- Animals etcetera (voices, 1971) [Boosey & Hawkes]
- It's snowing (1972) [Boosey & Hawkes]
- Carol (snow fell softly down) (1973)
- The Bald Twit Lion (Spike Milligan, music-theatre, 1973)
- Songs for a little child (soloists, 2 choirs, ensemble, 1973)
- peace music (SATB 1974)
- Four Groups for use in the classroom or for audience participation (aleatory music, 1974) [Novello]
- Three Carols (1974–93) Shepherds' Carol; Manger Carol; Bells Carol
- Missa Brevis (SATB, 1975)
- Diary (children's voices on tape, 1975)
- Colours II (organ, 1976)
- Earth Rituals (1978)
- After Malevich (solo violin, 1979)
- Dum transisset (SATB, 1979)
- Study: Protest & Survive (instrumental ensemble, 1980)
- Synapse (violin & keyboard, 1980)
- …to the holy goddess, Sulis (2 amplified voices, 1981)
- Fanfare (5 brass, 1983)
- Birthday Ode for Aaron Copland (orchestra, 1990) [Verlag Neue Musik]
- Tapiola Sunrise (string orchestra, 1998)
- Cristalflood (voices, orchestra, 2001)
- Thambapanni (orchestra, with Kandy drummers, 2004)
- Paliopoli, Stone Study (pebbles, 2005)
- Second Delphic Hymn (strings, 2005)
- Sainte Marie (brass & string orch, 2005–07)
- Missa Sancta Pauli Apostoli (SATB org, 2006) [Colla Voce]
- Missa Sacré Coeur (choirs and orch, 2007)
- Evening Canticles, Second Service (Sops and org, 2007)
- St Pancras Canticles, Third Service (SSATB, 2007)
- A Song of Judith (SSA org, 2007) [Colla Voce]
- String Studies, Book 1 (solo Vc, 2007)
- Versicles & Responses (SATB, 2007)
- Music for a Kytherian Amphitheatre (solo Pf, 2007–08) [Verlag Neue Musik]
- A Great Multitude (SATB org, 2008) [Verlag Neue Musik]
- Clarifica me Pater (SATB Cl and strings, 2008)
- Sha'alu Shlom Yerushalayim (SSA & harp, 2008) [Verlag Neue Musik]
- Missa Sancti Dunstani (SATB, 2009) [Verlag Neue Musik]
- Missa Sancti Beornwaldi (SATB, 2009)
- After Malevich 2 (instrumental ensemble, 2009)
- Blonde Aphrodite Rose Up Quite Naked (2010)
- Evening Canticles, Fifth Service, 'The Bells' (SATB org, 2011)
- Mizmor Kaf Gimmel (voice and keyboard/harp) (2011) [Verlag Neue Musik]
- Danse macabre (music theatre, 2011) [Verlag Neue Musik]
- La Naissance d'Aphrodite (soprano and ensemble, 2011) [Verlag Neue Musik]

== Orchestrations/arrangements ==
- Erik Satie Le Fils des étoiles (chamber orchestra)
- Erik Satie Salut drapeau! (chamber orchestra)
- Erik Satie Pièces froides III (string orchestra)
- Sibelius Christmas Songs Op.1 (orchestra)
- Copland Three Old American Songs (string orchestra)
- Purcell Three pieces: Rondeau; Slow Air; Air (winds, brass & string orchestra)
- Schubert Three pieces: Andantino; Serenade; Allegro moderato (string orchestra)
- Gail Laughton Bicycle Riders (string orchestra 2006)
- Haydn Symphony No. 53 (string orchestra)
- Sumer Is Icumen In (string orchestra)
- Three Medieval Motets (string orchestra)
- Gluck Overture: Iphigénie en Aulide (string orchestra 2008)
- First Delphic Hymn (strings)
- Tchaikovsky Two movements from String Quartet No. 1 (string orchestra)
- John Tavener Little Missenden Calm (string orchestra)
- Three Machaut Rondeaux

== Arrangements for choir ==
- Copland The Golden Willow Tree (SATB) [Boosey & Hawkes]
- Berlin White Christmas (SATB)
- Gershwin Love is here (SATB)
- Gershwin A foggy day (SATB)
- Gershwin The Man I love (SATB)
- Gershwin Summertime (SATB)
- Cole Porter Ev'ry time we say goodbye (SATB)
- Vivien Ellis Spread a little happiness (SATB)
- Fredereick Rzewski Struggle Song (SATB, 1983)
