= Isidora Žebeljan =

Serbian composer (1967–2020)

- Born: 27 September 1967; Belgrade, SFR Jugoslavija
- Died: 29 September 2020 (aged 53); Belgrade
- Era: Contemporary

Isidora Žebeljan (27 September 1967 – 29 September 2020) was a Serbian composer and conductor. She was a professor of composition at the Belgrade Music Academy and a Fellow of the Serbian Academy of Sciences and Arts.

She won many national awards for her music, among them the Stevan Mokranjac National Music Award in 2004.

== Biography ==
Isidora Žebeljan studied composition at the Faculty of Music in Belgrade with Vlastimir Trajković (a student of Olivier Messiaen). She was Professor of Composition at the same Faculty from 2002. Her work as a composer earned her several significant awards in her country, including the Mokranjac Award in 2004. She won the New York Civitella Ranieri Foundation Fellowship in 2005. In 2006 she was elected to the Serbian Academy of Sciences and Arts (becoming a full member in 2012) and in 2012 she was elected to the World Academy of Art and Science (WAAS). In 2014 she received a Parliamentary Assembly of the Mediterranean Award for her achievement in art.

She attracted international attention with her opera Zora D. which was commissioned by the Genesis Foundation in London. The opera, directed by David Pountney and Nicola Raab, was premiered in Amsterdam in 2003. The same production opened the 50th season of the Vienna Chamber Opera in 2003.

Isidora Žebeljan received commissions from notable institutions and festivals, such as:

- the Venice Biennale (The Horses of Saint Mark, illumination for orchestra, 2004),
- Bregenz Festival (opera The Marathon; Hum away, hum away, for String orchestra),
- Genesis Foundation, London (for the opening of Bill Viola's exhibition 'The Passion' at the National Gallery in London in 2003),
- University of Kent,
- Muziektheater im Revier Gelsenkirchen (opera Simon the Chosen),
- International Horn Society,
- Accademia Musicale Chigiana, Siena (opera Two Heads and a Girl),
- City of London Festival

She composed works for notable musical ensembles, such as the Wiener Symphoniker, The Academy of St. Martin in the Fields, the Brodsky Quartet, Berlin Philharmonic Octet, Dutch Chamber Choir and London Brass. Her compositions were regularly performed throughout Europe, Israel, USA, and Asia, including the Venice Biennale, Bregenz Festival, Festival RAI Nuova Musica, City of London Festival, ISCM Festivals (Gothenburg, Wrocław), Festival Classique The Hague, Galway Arts Festival, Tallinn Summer Music Festival, WDR-Musikfest, Settembre musica Milano-Torino, Ultima Festival (Oslo), Swaledale Festival, Walled City Music Festival, Dulwich Music Festival (UK), Eilat Festival (Jerusalem), Festival Nous Sons (Barcelona), Festival L' Est (Milano), Crossing Border Festival (The Netherlands), Settimana Musicale Senese, Musical Biennale Zagreb, BEMUS (Belgrade), etc. Among the ensembles and musicians who performed music of Isidora Žebeljan are the Gothenburg Symphony Orchestra, Symphony Orchestra of RAI Torino, Real Filharmonía de Galicia, Janáček Philharmonic Orchestra, I Solisti Veneti, Neue Philharmonie Westfalen, No Borders Orchestra, Lutosławski Quartet, Nieuw Ensemble (Amsterdam), Zagros Ensemble (Helsinki), ensemble Sentieri Selvaggi (Milan), conductors Paul Daniel, Claudio Scimone, David Porcelijn, Christoph Poppen, Pierre-André Valade, pianists Kyoko Hashimoto and Aleksandar Madžar, hornist Stefan Dohr, clarinetists Joan Enric Lluna and Alessandro Carbonare, violinist Daniel Rowland and others.

Isidora Žebeljan was also one of the most prominent Serbian contemporary composers of theater and film music. She has composed music for more than thirty theater productions in Serbia, Norway, Croatia, and Montenegro. For her work in the field of theater music she was awarded the Sterija Award three times. She was also awarded the Yustat Biennial of Stage Design Award for best theatre music four times. In addition, Isidora Žebeljan worked on a number of film scores, including the orchestration of Goran Bregović's music for the films Time of the Gypsies, Arizona Dream and Underground (directed by Emir Kusturica), La Reine Margot (directed by Patrice Chéreau) and The Serpent's Kiss (directed by Philippe Rousselot). She composed the music for Miloš Radivojević's film How I was Stolen by the Germans. For this score she was awarded the Prize of the Film Festival in Sopot in 2011 (Serbia) and the FIPRESCI Prize of the Serbian Film Association in 2012.

Isidora Žebeljan also regularly appeared as a performer (conductor and pianist) of her own works and the works by other, mainly Serbian composers. She conducted concerts in London (with The Academy of St Martin in the Fields) and in Amsterdam (Muziekgebouw aan 't IJ), and performed as a pianist with the Brodsky Quartet.

In 2017, Isidora Žebeljan signed the Declaration on the Common Language of the Croats, Serbs, Bosniaks and Montenegrins.

She died on 29 September 2020 in Belgrade, Serbia.

== Recordings ==
In 2012, the German CD label Classic Produktion Osnabrück (CPO) released a CD with her orchestral music, performed by the Janáček Philharmonic Orchestra, Žebeljan Orchestra and conductor David Porcelijn (CPO 7776702). In 2015 the same label released a CD with her chamber music for strings, played by the Brodsky Quartet (CPO 777994–2). In 2013 the CD label Oboe Classics from London released a CD Balkan Bolero with her chamber music for winds (11 compositions). Other CD's with music of Isidora Žebeljan were released by the CD labels Deutsche Grammophon (The Horses of Saint Mark by No Borders Orchestra), Chandos Records (UK), Mascom Records (Serbia), Acousense (Germany), etc.

== Reception ==
Describing Žebeljan's music, David Pountney wrote:

When I was trawling through the entries for the Genesis Opera Prizes 1, amidst an absolute welter of indistinguishable representatives of what one might call 'academic modernism', Isidora Zebeljan's music struck me immediately as something original, fresh, and above all emotionally expressive – a rare commodity, but an essential one for interesting theatrical story telling.

— From the booklet for the opening of the 50th season of the Vienna Chamber Opera.

== Music ==
The exclusive publisher of her music is Ricordi-Universal.

=== Compositions ===
==== 2003–2017 ====
List
- *SALMO 78 (PSALM 78), for mixed choir, 2017.
- *THREE CURIOUS LOVES, concerto for violin and chamber orchestra, 2017.
- *PIPE AND FLAMINGOS, concerto for clarinet and orchestra, 2016/17.
- *IN THE INN, a minstrel dance for oboe, accordion, double bass and percussion, 2005/16.
- *DOPPLER, Forest song for reed (leave), oboe, tuba, double bass, piano and electronics, 2016.
- *NEEDLE SOUP, Surrealistic fairy-tale for octet (clarinet, horn, bassoon, string quartet and double bass), 2013/15.
- *SIMON THE FOUNDLING, opera with Prologue and three Acts (10 scenes), 2013/15.
- *LEDA, suite from incidental music for the play by Miroslav Krleža, for cor anglais (or saxophone), violin, accordion (or piano), double bass and percussion, 2001/15.
- *SARABANDE, for clarinet, violin and piano, 2001/14.
- *TEARS ARE O. K, diptych from incidental music for the play by Mirjana Bobić Mojsilović, for soprano, cor anglais, violin, accordion (or piano) and double bass, 1999/2014.
- *FELISIYA, a Love Song for flute and harp (or piano), 2002/14.
- *HUM AWAY, STRINGS!, Song and Dance for violin and piano (with the Magic Flute in the background), 2014.
- *SARABANDE, for flute, cello and piano, 2014.
- *THE MIRACLE IN SHARGAN, Song for solo accordion, 2002/13.
- *SARABANDE, for piano trio, 2001/13.
- *HUM AWAY, HUM AWAY, STRINGS, Methamorphosis to themes from Mozart's opera 'Magic Flute', for symphony orchestra, 2013.
- *NEW SONGS OF LADA WITHOUT WORDS, for oboe, cor anglais, and oboe d'amore (ad libitum) and accordion, 2006/13.
- *NEW SONGS OF LADA, for soprano and accordion, 2006/13.
- *TWO SONGS OF THE BRIDE OF THE WIND, from incidental music after Slobodan Šnajder, for cor anglais, (female voice ad libitum), accordion and double bass, 2003/13.
- *NEW SONGS OF LADA WITHOUT WORDS, for oboe, cor anglais, oboe d'amore (ad libitum) and string orchestra, 2006/13.
- *THE MOUSETRAP, diptych from incidental music for the play by Agatha Christie, for cor anglais, violin and piano, 1995/2013.
- *SIMON AND ANNE, Hymn, Psalm and Réjouissance for cor anglais and piano, 2012/13.
- *DANCE OF THE WOODEN STICKS, for cor anglais and string orchestra, 2008/13.
- *SARABANDE, for string orchestra, 2001/13.
- *WHEN GOD CREATED DUBROVNIK, Song for Mezzo-Soprano and String Quartet, 2012.
- *TWO HEADS AND A GIRL (DUE TESTE E UNA RAGAZZA), Opera in one act (5 scenes), 2012.
- *SIMON AND ANNE, Hymn, Psalm and Réjouissance for cello and piano, 2012.
- *SARABANDE, for viola, cello and harp, 2001/12.
- *NEW SONGS OF LADA, for soprano and string quartet, 2006/11.
- *THE TEMPEST, suite from incidental music after Shakespeare for soprano, flute (ad libitum), oboe (ad libitum), clarinet, violin, cello, double bass, piano and percussion, 2001/11.
- *JEGOR'S ROAD, suite from incidental music after Vida Ognjenović, for flute, clarinet, violin, viola, piano and double bass, 2000/11.
- *LEONCE AND LENA, suite from incidental music after Büchner for soprano, flute, oboe, viola, double bass, piano and percussion, 1998/2011.
- *THE DAMNED YARD, diptych from incidental music for the play based on the novel by Ivo Andrić, for soprano, clarinet, violin, piano, double bass and narrator (ad libitum), 1999/2011.
- *OH, DIE, MY LOVE, Song for violin, female voice (ad libitum) and piano, 2011.
- *JESUS, HEAL MY WOUNDS, a prayer for female voice and piano, 2010.
- *SIMON THE CHOSEN (SIMON DER ERWÄHLTE), Opera in one act (5 scenes), 2009.
- *POLOMKA QUARTET, for string quartet, 2009/11.
- *LATUM LALO, for mixed choir (12 voices), 2008.
- *DANCE OF THE WOODEN STICKS, for horn and string orchestra (or string quintet), 2008 (2011).
- *THE MARATHON (EINE MARATHON FAMILIE), Opera in one act (14 scenes), 2007/8.
- *SARABANDE, for alt-flute, viola and harp, 2001/7.
- *DARK VELVET, in Memory of Gustav Mahler, for piano, 2006.
- *NEW SONGS OF LADA, for soprano and string orchestra, 2006.
- *THE MIRACLE IN SHARGAN, song for oboe and piano (or accordion), 2002/5 (2012).
- *SARABANDE, for piano, 2001/5.
- *GHOST FROM THE PUMPKIN, Incantation for brass quintet, 2005.
- *ARIA OF OLD VIDA, from the opera Zora D, for mezzo-soprano and harp, 2003/5.
- *THE MINSTREL'S DANCE, for chamber orchestra, 2005.
- *THE HORSES OF SAINT MARK, Illumination for symphony orchestra, 2004.
- *THE MIRACLE IN SHARGAN, song for oboe and violin (or viola), 2003.
- *SONG OF A TRAVELLER IN THE NIGHT, for clarinet and string quartet, 2003.
- *ZORA D, Opera in one act (7 scenes), 2002/3.
- *GIROTONDO, for oboe, piano, double bass and percussion, 2003.

==== 1993–2002 ====
List
- *THREE GOAT'S EARS, Suite for oboe, violin and piano (or string orchestra), 2002 (2011).
- *THE MIRACLE IN SHARGAN, Song for oboe solo, 2002.
- *SARABANDE, for cor anglais, violin and piano, 2002.
- *SARABANDE, for flute, soprano voice and piano, 2001.
- *RUKOVETI, five songs for soprano voice piano, 1999.
- *RUKOVETI, five songs for soprano voice and orchestra, 1999/2000.
- *THREE PIECES FOR GUITAR, 1999.
- *ARNOLF'S SONG, from incidental music for the play 'The School for Wives' by Molière, for countertenor, viola (ad libitum), double bass and piano, 1998.
- *GIROTONDO, for two saxophones, piano, percussion and double bass, 1994.
- *GIROTONDO, for alto saxophone, piano, double bass and darbucca, 1994.
- *CHORAL, for three voices and double bass (or vocal quartet), 1994.
- *IL CIRCO, Sketch for piano, 1993.

==== 1985–1992 ====
List
- *ESCENAS PICARAS – sinfonia in tre movimenti, for symphony orchestra, 1990/2.
- *A YAWL ON THE DANUBE, Scene for soprano, piano, percussion and string quartet, 1991.
- *SONG FOR BARON MÜHNHAUSEN, for polynstrumentalist, 1989.
- *PEP IT UP, Fantasy for soprano voice, piano, percussion and string quintet, 1988.
- *UMBRA, for piano, 1987.
- *SELIŠTE (DESERTED VILLAGE), Elegy for string orchestra, 1987.
- *GLORY, Picture for female choir (42 voices), 1987.
- *SONATA FOR VIOLIN AND PIANO, 1986.
- *STORY, Song for baritone (or mezzo-soprano) and piano, 1986.
- *FRONTIRESMAN'S SONG, 1985.
- *SUITE FOR PIANO, 1985.
- *CHAGRIN DU HERO, for mixed choir, 1985.

=== Incidental music ===
- Erlend Loe: Doppler; Production: Trøndelag Teater, Trondheim (Norwegen), 2016 – for reeds, oboe, cor anglais, ocarina's, tuba, double bass, bass guitar, ukulele, piano, percussion and elektronic. Director: Tomi Janežič.
- Anton Pavlovich Chekhov: Seagull; production of the Serbian National Theatre in Novi Sad, 2012 – for singers, flute/piccolo, oboe, trompet, double bass, percussion and piano. Director: Tomi Janežič.
- Uglješa Šajtinac: Banat; production of the Yugoslav Drama Theatre, 2007 – for oboe, English horn, violin, cello and piano. Director: Dejan Mijač. (CD 'Illuminations')
- Thomas Bernhard: Heldenplatz; production of the "Atelje 212" Theatre in Belgrade, 2006 – for string quartet and piano. Director: Dejan Mijač. (CD 'Illuminations')
- Anton Pavlovich Chekhov: Three Sisters; production of the National Theatre in Belgrade, 2006 – for violin and piano. Director: Vida Ognjenović.
- Peter Shaffer: Amadeus; production of Croatian National Theatre "Ivan pl. Zajc", Rijeka (Croatia), 2006 – for soprano and harpsichord. Director: Tomi Janežič.
- Biljana Srbljanović: Locusts; production of the Yugoslav Drama Theatre, 2005 – for soprano and electronic. Director: Dejan Mijač.
- William Shakespeare: King Lear; production of the "Atelje 212" Theatre in Belgrade, 2005 – for prepared piano. Director: Tomi Janežič. (CD 'Illuminations')
- Slobodan Šnajder: The Bride of the Wind; production of the National Theatre in Belgrade, 2003 – for female voice, English horn, violoncello, double bass and keyboards. Director: Boris Miljković. (CD 'Illuminations')
- Martin Crimp: The Country; production of the National Theatre in Belgrade, 2002 – for electronic. (CD 'Illuminations')
- Ljubomir Simović: The Miracle in Schargan; production of the "Atelje 212" Theatre in Belgrade, 2002 – for piano, percussion and chamber orchestra. Director: Dejan Mijač. (CD 'Illuminations')
- Vida Ognjenović: Mileva Einstein; production of the National Theatre in Belgrade, 2001 – for flute, clarinet, violin, viola, double bass and piano. Director: Vida Ognjenović. (CD 'Illuminations')
- William Shakespeare: The Tempest; production of the City Theatre Budva Festival (Montenegro), 2001 – for flute, clarinet, trumpet, soprano voice, violin, violoncello, double bass, keyboards and percussions. Director: Slobodan Unkovski. (CD 'Illuminations')
- Hugo Betti: The Crime on the Goat Island; production of the City Theatre Budva Festival, Montenegro, 2001 – for electronic. Director: Nebojša Bradić.
- Miroslav Krleža: Leda; production of the "Atelje 212" Theatre in Belgrade, 2001 – for violin, soprano and alto saxophone, trumpet, piano, drums and double bass. Director: Dejan Mijač. (CD 'Illuminations')
- Vida Ognjenović: Jegor's Road; production of the City Theatre Budva Festival (Montenegro), 2000 – for flute, clarinet, violin, viola, piano and double bass
- Jean Paul Sartre: Dirty Hands; production of the Yugoslav Drama Theatre, 2000 – for trumpet, piano, violin, viola and violoncello
- Radoslav Pavlović: Eleven Weeks; production of the Yugoslav Drama Theatre, 2000 – techno music
- Franz Xaver Kroetz: The Impuls; production of the "Atelje 212" Theatre in Belgrade, 2000 – techno music
- Anton Pavlovich Chekhov: The Cherry Orchard; production of the Yugoslav Drama Theatre, 2000 – for piano and string quartet (CD 'Illuminations')
- Alexander Dumas / Stevan Koprivica: The Three Musketeers; production of the "Boško Buha" Theatre in Belgrade, 1999 – for flute, trumpet, violin, guitar, piano, female voice, double bass and percussion (CD 'Illuminations')
- Miodrag Karadžić: You Just Go and We Will Croak and Howl; production of the Belgrade Dramatic Theatre, 1999 – for violin, accordion, clarinet, piano and double bass
- Ivo Andrić / Nebojša Bradić: The Damned Yard; production of the National Theatre in Kruševac, 1999 – for female voice, mixed choir, flute, clarinet, violin, piano and double bass
- Mirjana Bobić Mojsilović: Tears Are O.K.; production of the National Theatre in Belgrade, 1999 – for female voice, alto saxophone, violin, piano and double bass (CD 'Illuminations')
- Ljubivoje Ršumović: Emperor Trayan Had Goat's Ears; production of the "Boško Buha" Theatre in Belgrade, 1999 – for female voice, female and mixed choir, pipes, violin, flute, piano, double bass and percussion (CD 'Illuminations')
- Maksim Gorky: The Philistines; production of the Belgrade Drama Theatre, 1998 – for string quartet
- Molière: The School for Women; production of the Montenegro National Theatre, Pogrorica (Montenegro), 1998 – for male voice, violin, clarinet, bass clarinet, piano and double bass (CD 'Illuminations')
- Georg Büchner: Leonce and Lena; co production of the City Theatre Budva Festival (Montenegro) and the Yugoslav Drama Theatre, 1998 – for soprano voice, flute, oboe, viola, piano, double bass, tubular bells and tom-toms (CD 'Illuminations')
- Jeremy Brack: Oliver Twist; production of the "Boško Buha" Theatre in Belgrade, 1998 – for violin, clarinet, E flat clarinet, bass clarinet, piano and double bass
- Arthur Miller: All My Sons; production of the Belgrade Drama Theatre, 1998 – for piano and string quartet
- Goran Marković: Speech Impediment; production of the National Theatre in Belgrade, 1997 – for trumpet, piano, double bass and drums
- Richard Brinsley Sheridan: The Rivals; production of the Belgrade Drama Theatre, 1997 – for violin, piano, bassoon and double bass
- Berthold Brecht: A Man Is A Man; production of the Belgrade Drama Theatre, 1996 – for violin, alto saxophone, guitar, accordion, piano, drums and double bass
- Agatha Christie: The Mousetrap; production of the Belgrade Drama Theatre, 1995 – for violin, alto saxophone and piano (CD 'Illuminations')
- Frank Wedekind: Spring's Awakening; production of the National Theatre in Kragujevac, 1990 – for electronic
- Dušan Kovačević: Hilarious Tragedy; production of the National Theatre in Šabac, 1989 – for electronic
- Dušan Kovačević: The Professional; production of the National Theatre in Šabac, 1989 – for electronic
- Dubravka Ugrešić: Life is a Fairy Tale; production of the Student Cultural Centre, Belgrade, 1987 – for electronic

=== Film scores ===
- How I was stolen by the Germans, directed by Miloš Radivojević, 2010 – for cello and piano
- Don't Know When or How or Where, documentary directed by Želimir Gvardiol, 1993 – for violin, alto saxophone, piano and double bass
- Big Small Graduation, directed by Mina Stanojević, 1990 – for female and male voices, electric guitar, piano and drums
- Maria Like You, directed by Mina Stanojević, 1986 – for female voice, electric guitar, piano and drums

=== Discography ===
- CPO, Germany, 777994-2 (2015); Brodsky Quartet plays Isidora Žebeljan; 'Song of a Traveller in the Night', Chamber Music
- DEUTSCHE GRAMMOPHON, 481 107-3 (2015); Isidora Žebeljan; The Horses of Saint Mark, illumination for orchestra
- COMPOSERS ASSOCIATION OF SERBIA (2015); Fieriness, Serbian music for piano trio; Isidora Žebeljan
- MASCOM Records, Serbia, LC 29730, CD 290 (2014); Isidora Žebeljan; Zora D, opera in one act (seven scenes)
- OBOE CLASSICS, UK, CC 2028 (2013); Balkan Bolero; Chamber music by Isidora Žebeljan
- MASCOM Records, Serbia, LC 29730, CD 217 (2013); Isidora Žebeljan; Illuminations, Music for Theatre
- B92, Serbia, CD 116 (2008); Isidora Žebeljan; Illuminations, Music for Theatre
- SANU, Serbia (2011); Muzika kompozitora – akademika SANU
- COMPOSERS ASSOCIATION OF SERBIA (2013); Women's Stories, Serbian piano music
- Muzika klasika, Music Magazine for Classical Music, No. 3 (2011)
- Belgrade Strings; Anthology of 20th Century Serbian Music for Strings (noncommercial edition, 2006) (CD No. 2)
- Teatro Comunale di Monfalcone, Italy (2005); Sentieri selvaggi dal vivo; Isidora Žebeljan: A Yawl on the Danube, scene for soprano, piano, percussion and string quartet
- Genesis Foundation, London, UK (noncommercial edition, 2002); The Genesis Prizes for Opera; Work in Progress Presentations 2002; Isidora Žebeljan: an extract from the opera Zora D.

=== Significant works ===
- Operas: Zora D; The Marathon; Simon, the Chosen; Two Heads and a Girl; Simon the Foundling
- Orchestral music: The Horses of Saint Mark; Hum away, hum away strings; Escenas picaras; Deserted Village
- Orchestral music with soloists: Rukoveti, five songs for soprano and orchestra; New Songs of Lada, for soprano and string orchestra (or string quartet); Dance of the Wooden Sticks, for French horn (or cor anglais) and *String orchestra (or string quintet); Pipe and Flamingos, concerto for clarinet and orchestra
- Chamber music: Song of a Traveller in the Night, for clarinet and string quartet; Polomka quartet, for string quartet; Simon and Anne, suite for cello (or cor anglais) and piano; Needle Soup, for octet
- Vocal music: Latum lalo, for mixed choir; Pep it up, fantasy for soprano and chamber ensemble; When God created Dubrovnik, song for Mezzo-soprano and string quartet
- Piano music: Umbra, Il Circo

== Awards ==
- Parliamentary Assembly of the Mediterranean Award, in acknowledgement of her artistic achievements in the musical field in the Mediterranean region, 2014.
- Musica Classica Magazine Award for the best composer of the year 2013 (for the opera Two Heads and a Girl), 2014.
- Full member of the Serbian Academy of Sciences and Arts., 2012.
- Award for the best original score at the 40th Film Festival in Sopot (Serbia), for the movie How I was Stolen by the Germans, directed by Miloš Radivojevic, 2011.
- Belgrade's daily newspapers Danas has pronounced Isidora Žebeljan The person of the decade in music, 2010.
- Berlin's weekly magazine Der Freitag has listed Isidora Žebeljan for the ten most promising public figures in the world for the year 2009.
- Sterija's award at the 51st 'Sterija' Theatre Festival (Sterijino pozorje), Novi Sad, for the original score for the play Skakavci by Biljana Srbljanovic, production of the Yugoslav Drama Theatre, Belgrade, 2007.
- Elected the youngest member of the Serbian Academy of Sciences and Arts, 2006.
- Gorki list Creativity Award for creativity in culture and arts, 2005.
- The fellowship of the Civitella Ranineri Foundation, New York, 2005.
- 'Stevan Mokranjac' Award – the Serbian Government Music Award, for the opera Zora D, 2004.
- Grand Prix YUSTAT-The Fourth Biennale of Theatre Design for the original score for the play The Miracle in Schargan by Ljubomir Simovic, production of the "Atelje 212" Theatre, Belgrade, 2002.
- Vasilije Mokranjac's Foundation Award, Belgrade, for the composition Rukoveti, five songs for soprano and orchestra, 2001..
- Sterija's award at the 45th 'Sterija' Theatre Festival (Sterijino pozorje), Novi Sad for the original score for the play Jegor's Road by Vida Ognjenovic, production of the Budva City Theatre Festival, Montenegro, 2001.
- Grand Prix for the original score for the play The Three Musketeers by Alexander Dumas/Stevan Koprivica, at the Children Theatre Festival, Kotor, Montenegro, production of the "Boško Buha" Theatre, Belgrade, 2000.
- Grand Prix YUSTAT-The Third Biennale of Theatre Design for the original score for the play Leonce and Lena by Georg Büchner, production of the Budva City Theatre Festival and the Yugoslav Drama Theatre, Belgrade, 2000..
- Sterija's award at the 42nd 'Sterija' Theatre Festival (Sterijino pozorje), Novi Sad, for the original score for the play Speech Impediment by Goran Markovic, production of the National Theatre, Belgrade, 1998.
- Grand Prix YUSTAT, the Second Biennale of Theatre Design for the original score, 1998.
- Grand Prix YUSTAT, the First Biennale of Theatre Design for the original score for the play A Man Is A Man by Berthold Brecht, production of the Belgrade Drama Theatre, 1996.
