= London Concert Choir =

London Concert Choir (LCC) is one of London's leading amateur choirs. The choir was formed in 1960 (as the Brompton Choral Society), and the full-time membership consists of ca 150 singers of a wide range of ages.

LCC performs at concert venues such as the Barbican, the Southbank and Cadogan Hall. The choir has sung in cathedrals and other churches in and around London and has toured France, Germany, Italy and Spain. It has a varied repertoire. Its music director is Mark Forkgen.

The choir's 50th anniversary in 2010 was marked by two performances of Britten's War Requiem. Among other major works in recent seasons have been Mozart's Requiem with the London Mozart Players, Rachmaninov's choral symphony The Bells with the Royal Philharmonic Orchestra, and Elgar's Dream of Gerontius, Mendelssohn's Elijah, Brahms’ German Requiem and Vaughan Williams’ Sea Symphony, all with Southbank Sinfonia.

Performances with the Counterpoint ensemble include Handel's Messiah, Bach's St Matthew Passion and Christmas Oratorio, Monteverdi's Vespers of 1610 and Schubert's rarely-heard Mass in E flat. Operas in concert performance have ranged from Gluck's Orfeo to the London premiere of The Chalk Legend by Stephen McNeff. LCC has also performed Ellington's Sacred Concert, Will Todd’s Mass in Blue and a concert to mark Leonard Bernstein’s centenary.

The choir often gives concerts for charity and continues to commission new works, including A Light not yet Ready to Go Out by Alison Willis in aid of Breast Cancer Now, and Per Ardua ad Astra, a major work by the baritone and composer Roderick Williams to commemorate the centenary of the Royal Air Force.

London Concert Choir welcomes new members, who are invited to attend a few rehearsals before an informal audition.
