= Ralph Woodward =

English classical conductor, arranger and organist

- Born: 17 November 1971 (age 54); Stockton-on-Tees, England
- Origin: England
- Genre: Classical
- Occupations: Conductor; arranger
- Instrument: Organ
- Years active: 1995–present

Ralph Woodward (born 17 November 1971) is an English classical conductor, arranger and organist. His main focus is on conducting choirs.

== Early life and education ==
Ralph Woodward was born in Stockton-on-Tees, England.

He attended Durham Chorister School from 1979 to 1985, and then went to Durham School, where he was a King's Scholar and a Music Scholar. He spent 1990–91 as Organ Scholar at Durham Cathedral, before taking up an Organ Scholarship at Queens' College, Cambridge, where he studied for a BA and a BMus, specialising in the music of Benjamin Britten. While there he unearthed and published an early Evening Service by Charles Villiers Stanford, and commissioned the cantata Midwinter by Will Todd.

== Career ==
Since 1995, Woodward has been a freelance musician. While his work has taken him all over the world, the bulk of it has been in and around Cambridge. Since 1997, he has been musical director of the Fairhaven Singers, and has overseen their development into a leading chamber choir. From 2002 to 2010, he was musical director of the Britten–Pears Chamber Choir. Until 2016 he was the musical director of NORVIS, an early music summer school in Durham, and of Full Score, a semi-professional chamber choir. He has worked with a number of top orchestras, including the London Mozart Players, The Parley of Instruments, Britten Sinfonia and City of London Sinfonia. He is also active as an editor for Oxford University Press, with particular involvement in the William Walton Edition. He has made many arrangements for choirs: his version of the theme for Upstairs, Downstairs was featured on BBC Radio 4's PM programme, and he has arranged and conducted the choral music for two albums by Cradle of Filth. He has conducted the premieres of works by many leading composers, including Jonathan Dove, Bob Chilcott, Will Todd, Eriks Esenvalds, Cecilia McDowall and Ola Gjeilo. From January 2022 to December 2025 he was interim assistant director of music at King's College, Cambridge, conducting King's Voices.

== Discography ==
- The Queens' Service (1994)
- Vox Dicentis (1996)
- Angelic Harmonies (1997)
- Will Todd Choral Music (2002)
- The Blue Skies That Sparkle (2007)
- Will Todd Requiem (2009)
- Full of Grace: Songs to the Virgin Mary (2011)
- Into the Stars (2015)
- Sappho Sings (2022)
