= Fairhaven Singers =

The Fairhaven Singers is a chamber choir based in Cambridge, UK, directed by Ralph Woodward. The choir is a mixed ensemble of about 48 amateur singers singing choral repertoire from the 15th century to the present. Among the major works it has performed are Bach's St John Passion and St Matthew Passion, Mozart's Requiem, Brahms' Requiem, James MacMillan's Seven Last Words from the Cross and (in collaboration at Ely Cathedral in 2026) Benjamin Britten’s War Requiem. It has commissioned and premiered new works from composers that have included Jonathan Dove, Will Todd, Bob Chilcott, Carl Rütti and Cecilia MacDowall.

It performs mainly in Cambridge, most often in Trinity College Chapel, St John's College Chapel and Queens' College Chapel. It has also appeared at Snape Maltings Concert Hall, Suffolk, including concerts at the Aldeburgh Festival and Britten's War Requiem at the Britten Festival; at Ely Cathedral; at venues in London, including St Martin-in-the-Fields and St John's Smith Square; and at concert venues in Europe, including St Mark's Basilica, Venice. It has also been featured on BBC Radio 2, BBC Radio 3, BBC Radio 4, and Classic FM.

The choir was founded in 1980, and is under the patronage of Lord Fairhaven of Anglesey Abbey.

== Commissions and premières ==
- Will Todd, Magnificat, 1997
- Richard Lloyd, A Garland of Praise, 1998
- Jake Howarth, Pied Beauty, 2008
- Graham Lack, Sanctus, 2009 (UK premiere)
- Will Todd, Requiem, 2009
- Bob Chilcott, Ave Maria, 2010
- Carl Rütti, Amen, 2011
- Will Todd, Songs of Peace, 2012
- Joseph Phibbs, Lullay, lullay, thou lytil child, 2012
- Will Todd, Te Deum (string-orchestra version), 2013
- Thomas Hewitt Jones and Andrew Motion, Formation, 2013
- Somtow Sucharitkul, ClareVoyance, 2014
- Ēriks Ešenvalds, The Time Has Come
- Ralph Woodward, Summer Happiness, 2016
- Cecilia McDowall, God is Light, 2016
- Ola Gjeilo, LUX, 2017
- Geoff Page, Battle Cries, 2018
- Jonathan Dove, Sappho Sings, 2019
- Alan Bullard, Beauty, Joy, 2021
- Cecilia McDowall, A tree is a song, 2023

== Discography ==
- The Blue Skies that Sparkle (2007)
- Will Todd, Requiem (2009) - awarded five stars by Choir and Organ magazine
- Full of Grace: Songs to the Virgin (2011)
- Into the Stars (2015) - music composed for the Fairhaven Singers
- Sappho Sings (2022) - music commissioned from Jonathan Dove
