= Reading Festival Chorus =

English musical group

Reading Festival Chorus is a chorus which was formed in 1945 to give performances of larger scale choral works. It is based in the town of Reading in the English county of Berkshire. Rehearsals are held on Monday evenings in central Reading (RG1 4BW) and new members are always welcomed.

The Chorus appointed Greg Hallam as its musical director in 2018, and its patron is the pianist John Lill.

The Chorus is twinned with the Johanneskantorei of Düsseldorf, Germany, with whom they performed Handel's Messiah in October 2015 to celebrate the 70th anniversary of the founding of the Chorus.

The chorus sings a diverse programme of classical music programme, with works such as Mozart's Requiem, Karl Jenkins' The Armed Man in 2005 to Beethoven's Missa Solemnis and a summer programme of English and American Folksongs by Tippett and Aaron Copland.

Their 2014-15 Season comprised the Brahms Deutsches Requiem; Haydn, Mass in a Time of War and Parry, Songs of Farewell; Elgar's Music Makers and Chilcott, Aesop's Fables. In 2016-17 they performed a concert of Mozart at Douai Abbey, (including Mozart Solemn Vespers), Judas Maccabeus by Handel on 8 April 2017, and Rutter Requiem and The Mass of the Martyrs by their then-Musical Director Edward-Rhys Harry on 1 July 2017.

The 2017/18 Season included: Bach, Christmas Oratorio and Saint-Saens, Oratorio de Noel (December 2017); a programme of European and American choral classics with their interim musical director, Andrew Haase (24 March 2018); and Schubert, Mass in G, Handel, Dixit Dominus with Greg Hallam (14 July 2018).

The 2019 programme included Lenten Reflections (a seasonal programme including Bach: Komm, Jesu, Komm and Buxtehude: Membra Jesu Nostri) on 23 March and Verdi's Requiem (sung with RFC's twin choir, the Johanneskantorei Düsseldorf on 22 June in the Great Hall of the University of Reading, and again in the Johanneskirche, Düsseldorf on 21 September 2019).

The 2019/20 season opened at Douai Abbey, Upper Woolhampton, Berkshire, on 30 November, with a concert of Advent music, entitled 'A Spotless Rose'. It was to have been followed by a programme including music by Rheinberger and the two-piano version of the Brahms Requiem at Leighton Park School in March 2021 and a programme of Shakespeare Songs and Sonnets in the summer term, but these concerts were cancelled because of the COVID-19 pandemic.

The Chorus began its 2021/22 season on 27 November 2021 with a performance in St Laurence's Church, Reading including Haydn's 'Little Organ Mass' and Vivaldi's 'Gloria' RV 589.

Former Musical Directors include Edward-Rhys Harry, Janet Lincé and Jacques Cohen.
