= Will Todd =

English musician and composer

Will Todd (b 14 January 1970) is an English musician and composer. He is a pianist, who performs regularly with others in his own works.

== Biography and work ==
Todd was born in County Durham, attended Durham School and joined the choir of St Oswald's Church, Durham under its choirmaster David Higgins. He went on to study music at the University of Bristol. He is a pianist and regularly performs with his trio, and this played a large role in one of his best-known works, his Mass in Blue.

Mass in Blue (originally entitled Jazz Mass) was commissioned by Hertfordshire Chorus and first performed at the Cambridge Corn Exchange in July 2003 with Will Todd at the piano. Todd's wife, Bethany Halliday, performed the soprano solo alongside the Blue Planet Orchestra and Hertfordshire Chorus, conducted by David Temple.

His work The Blackened Man won second prize in the International Verdi Opera Competition in 2002 and was later staged at the 2004 Buxton Festival. The Screams of Kitty Genovese, a piece of music theatre, has been produced at the Boston Conservatory and New York Musical Theatre Festival. His oratorio Saint Cuthbert, with a libretto by Ben Dunwell based on the life of the saint, has been performed and recorded by the Hallé Orchestra and Choir under Christopher Austin.

Among Angels was commissioned by the Genesis Foundation and was first performed by The Sixteen in Salzburg. Written for WNO Max, Sweetness and Badness was performed on a tour during autumn 2006. Whirlwind, commissioned by Streetwise Opera, was first performed at The Sage Gateshead.

== List of compositions ==
=== Opera ===
- The Blackened Man – Opera with 7 roles, chorus and full orchestra or chamber ensemble (2001)
- Whirlwind – Opera with 4 actor singers, mixed chorus, small ensemble and live sound score (2006)
- Sweetness and Badness – Opera with 5 actor singers and small ensemble (2006)
- Migrations (2022), premiered by the Welsh National Opera at the Wales Millennium Center in Cardiff, Wales.

=== Cantata and Oratorio ===
- Midwinter – Cantata for soprano and baritone, chorus and orchestra (1992)
- Saint Cuthbert – Oratorio for soprano, tenor and baritone, chorus, organ and orchestra (1995)
- The Burning Road – Cantata for soprano and baritone, chorus and orchestra (1996)
- A Song of Creation – Cantata for choir, chamber choir, children's choir, soprano, tenor and bass soloists, organ and orchestra (2000)

=== Other ===
- Winter Dances – orchestra (1989)
- The Screams of Kitty Genovese – 12 actor-singers and pit ensemble (1999)
- Mass in Blue – soprano, chorus and jazz ensemble or trio (2003)
- Gala and Gloria – soprano, mezzo and baritone soloists, chorus, orchestra and brass band (2004)
- Among Angels – 16 part SATB with 2 harps (2006)
- Before Action – SATB, full orchestra. Commissioned by the BBC Singers. A setting of "Before Action" by W. N. Hodgson (2006)
- Let us be True – SATB, solo violin, piano, organ, percussion & strings. A setting of "Dover Beach" by Matthew Arnold (2006)
- You have seen the House Built – SATB choir and organ, commissioned by Chichester Cathedral for their 900th anniversary (2008)
- Requiem – soprano, electric guitar and chorus, commissioned by the Fairhaven Singers (2009)
- Te Deum – solo soprano, young people's choir (up to 3 parts), SATB chorus and instrumental ensemble. Latin text with additional words by Ben Dunwell (2009)
- Clarinet Concerto – Jazz clarinet and orchestra, premiered by Emma Johnson (2009)
- The Call of Wisdom – SATB choir and organ, commissioned as part of the Diamond Jubilee of Elizabeth II to be sung by the Diamond Choir (2012)
- Songs of Love – SATB choir and Jazz trio, commissioned by Symphony Silicon Valley Chorale for their Silver Anniversary concert (2012)
- Choral Symphony No.5 ("Rage Against The Dying Of The Light") - SATB choir and symphony orchestra, based on the poem "Do Not Go Gentle Into That Good Night" by Dylan Thomas; commissioned by the Crouch End Festival Chorus, and premiered at Barbican Hall, London in 2014.
- Jazz Missa Brevis (2015) - SATB choir and jazz ensemble
