= Jewish Book Week =

Literary festival in the UK

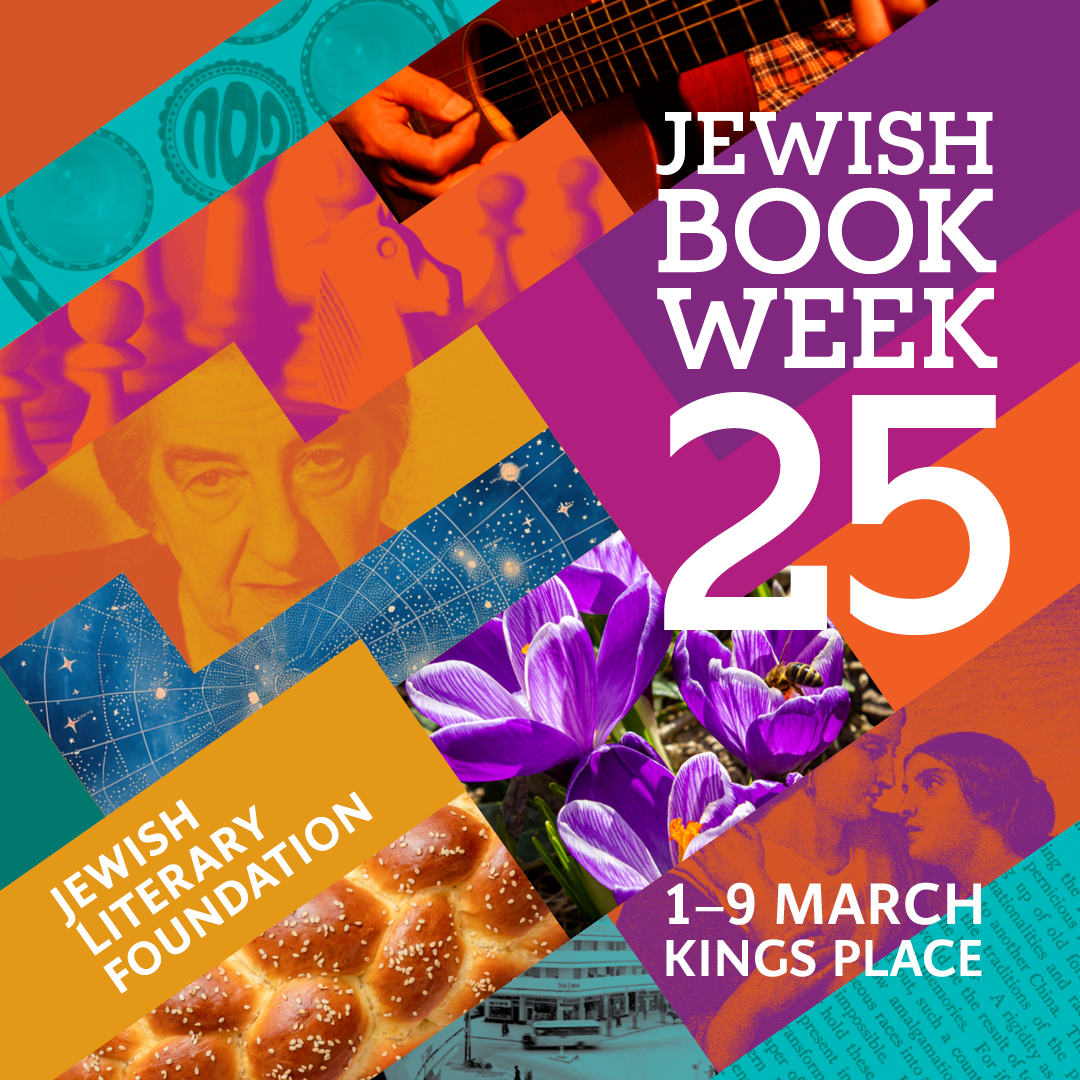
- Branding for Jewish Book Week 2025
- Status: active
- Genre: Literary festival
- Dates: February and March
- Frequency: Annually
- Venue: Kings Place
- Location: London
- Country: United Kingdom
- Inaugurated: 1952
- Founder: Dr George Webber
- Most recent: 2025
- Leader: Claudia Rubinstein

Jewish Book Week is a literary festival in London, held annually in February and March, that explores Jewish literature, ideas and culture. The festival was founded in 1952 and since 2012 it has been presented at Kings Place, alongside a variety of other venues such as JW3. It is organised by the UK Jewish Literary Foundation and its director is Claudia Rubinstein.

== See also ==
- Jewish Literary Foundation, a charity in the UK
- Jewish Book Council, a United States organization
- Jewish Book Month, an annual event in the United States
