= Harry Christophers =

British conductor

Harry Christophers CBE
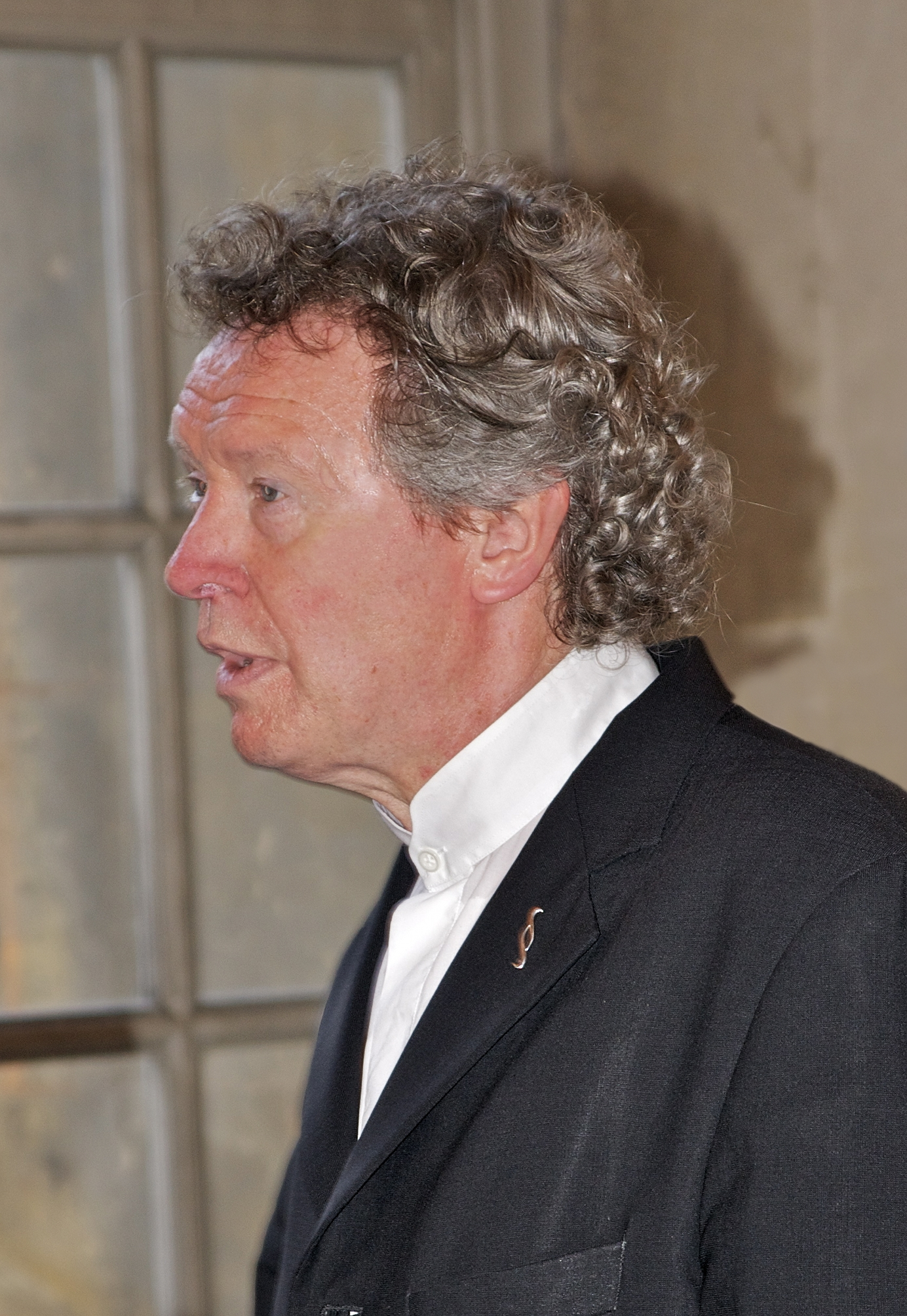
- Christophers during a concert at Versailles, France, 25 June 2012

Background information
- Born: Richard Henry Tudor Christophers; 26 December 1953 (age 72); Goudhurst, Kent, England
- Genres: Classical, opera
- Occupation: Conductor
- Years active: 1979-present
- Member of: The Sixteen

Richard Henry Tudor "Harry" Christophers CBE FRSCM (born 26 December 1953) is an English conductor.

== Life and career ==
Richard Henry Tudor Christophers was born in Goudhurst, Kent. He was a chorister at Canterbury Cathedral under choirmaster Allan Wicks, and later went to the King's School, Canterbury, where he played clarinet in the orchestra alongside Andrew Marriner. He has cited as his childhood musical influences the Rolling Stones, Brahms, Mahler, Stravinsky and Jethro Tull.

Christophers became an academical clerk at Magdalen College, Oxford, studying classics for two years before beginning his musical career. He spent six years as a lay vicar at Westminster Abbey and then time as a member of the Clerkes of Oxenford and three years in the BBC Singers.

=== The Sixteen and the Handel and other conducting work ===
Christophers founded the vocal ensemble the Sixteen in 1979. He has directed the Sixteen and its orchestra throughout Europe, America and the Far East, becoming recognised for his work in Renaissance, Baroque and 20th-century music. With the Sixteen he has conducted recordings for CORO (the Sixteen's own label) and other labels including Hyperion Records, UCJ and Virgin Classics. Several recordings have received honours such as a Grand Prix du Disque and a Midem award for Handel's Messiah, numerous Schallplattenkritik, the Gramophone Award for Early Music and the Classical Brit Award 2005 for the disc Renaissance. The Sixteen's 2009 recording of Handel's Coronation Anthems earned a Classic FM Gramophone Award in the Baroque Vocal category as well as Artist of the Year honours for Christophers and the Sixteen. The recording also earned Christophers a Grammy nomination for Best Choral Performance.

In 2000, Christophers began the "Choral Pilgrimage", a national tour of English cathedrals from York to Canterbury, in music from the pre-Reformation era as the Sixteen's contribution to the millennium celebrations. This then led to subsequent annual pilgrimages devised around particular themes. As part of The Sixteen's thirtieth anniversary in 2009, the ninth pilgrimage was dedicated to the anniversaries of Henry Purcell, James MacMillan and George Frideric Handel. The 2011 pilgrimage focused on the music of Tomás Luis de Victoria and the 2012 pilgrimage, entitled "The Earth Resounds", explores the sacred music of Flanders in the 15th and 16th centuries by composers Josquin, Brumel and Lassus.

In September 2008, Christophers was named the artistic director of the Handel and Haydn Society in Boston, Massachusetts, beginning in the 2009–2010 season, for an initial contract of three seasons. In September 2011, his contract with the Handel and Haydn Society was extended another four seasons until the 2015–2016 season, in time for the organisation's bicentennial celebrations. He concluded his Handel and Haydn Society tenure as its artistic director in May 2022, and now has the title of conductor laureate with the organisation.

In December 2008 BBC Four broadcast Sacred Music: The Story of Allegri's Miserere, presented by Simon Russell Beale, with a performance by The Sixteen conducted by Christophers at St Luke Old Street.

Christophers has conducted numerous productions for Lisbon Opera and English National Opera as well as conducting the UK premiere of Messager's opera Fortunio for Grange Park Opera. He is a regular conductor at Buxton Opera where he initiated a cycle of Handel's operas and oratorios including Semele, Samson and Saul.

Christophers is an honorary Fellow of Magdalen College, Oxford, as well as the Royal Welsh College of Music and Drama and has been awarded the honorary degree of Doctor of Music from the University of Leicester. Christophers is also Patron of the Southwell Music Festival in Nottinghamshire. He was appointed a Commander of the Order of the British Empire (CBE) in the 2012 Birthday Honours for services to music. In 2014, he was awarded with a fellowship of the Royal School of Church Music.

Cultural offices
| Preceded by Grant Llewellyn | Artistic Director, Handel and Haydn Society; 2009–2022 | Succeeded by Jonathan Cohen |
