= The Sixteen =

British choir and orchestra

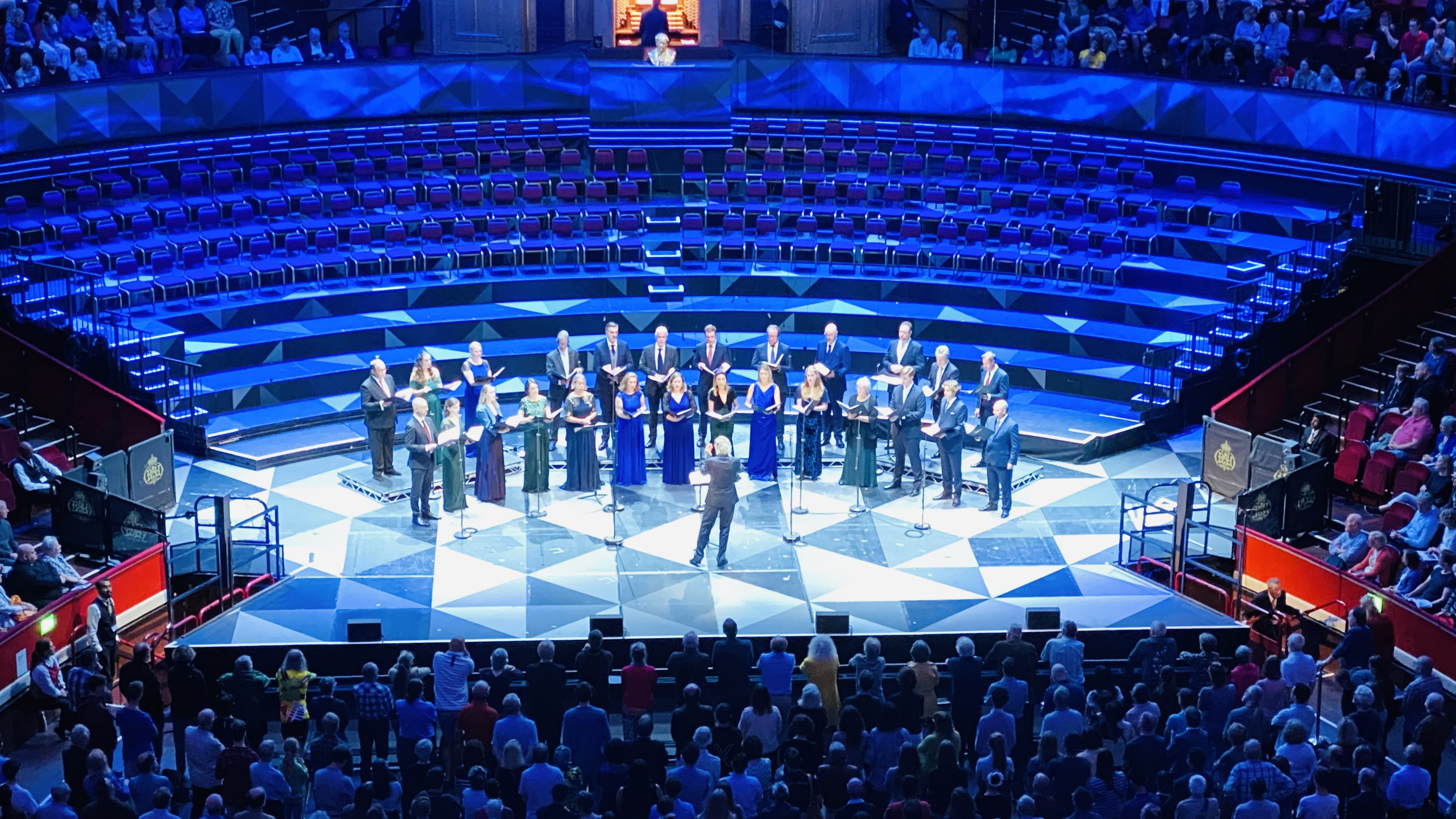
- The Sixteen at the BBC Proms in 2024

Background information
- Origin: United Kingdom
- Genres: Classical music
- Years active: 1977–present
- Labels: CORO
- Website: thesixteen.com

The Sixteen (previously known as the Symphony of Harmony and Invention) are a British choir and period instrument orchestra. Founded by Harry Christophers, they started as an unnamed group of sixteen friends in 1977, giving their first billed concert in 1979.

The group performs early English polyphony, works of the Renaissance, Baroque and early Classical music, and a diversity of 20th- and 21st-century music.

The Sixteen are "The Voices of Classic FM", TV media partner with Sky Arts and associate artists of the Southbank Centre in London and Bridgewater Hall in Manchester. The group promotes an annual series at the Queen Elizabeth Hall as well as the Choral Pilgrimage, a tour of Britain's finest cathedrals: bringing music back to the buildings for which it was written. The BBC television series Sacred Music was produced in collaboration with the Sixteen; between 2008 and 2015, two full series aired along with numerous specials.

The Sixteen are a registered charity under English law.

== Tours ==
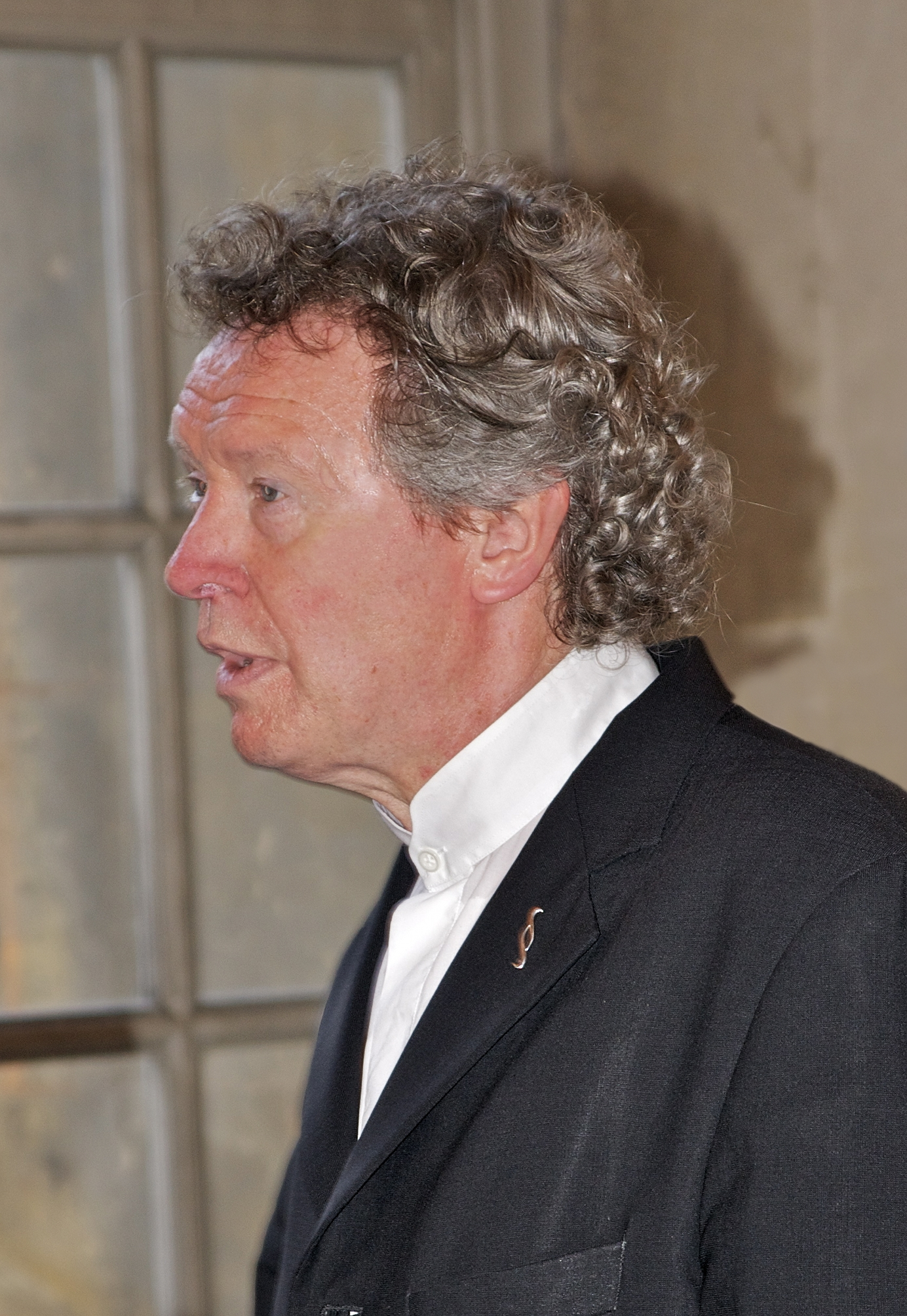
Harry Christophers, founder of the Sixteen

The Sixteen tour throughout Europe, Asia, Australia and the Americas and have given regular performances at major concert halls and festivals worldwide, including the Barbican Centre in London, the Bridgewater Hall in Manchester, the Concertgebouw in Amsterdam, the Sydney Opera House, Tokyo Opera City and the Vienna Musikverein. They have also performed at the BBC Proms and the festivals of Granada, Lucerne, Istanbul, Prague and Salzburg.. In the United Kingdom, each year since 2000 (excepting pandemic years) they have toured a selection of UK cathedrals and other venues with a tour entitled "The Choral Pilgrimage".

In addition, the Sixteen's period orchestra have taken part in semi-staged performances of Purcell's Fairy Queen in Tel Aviv and London, a fully-staged production of Purcell's King Arthur in Lisbon's Centro Cultural de Belém, followed by new productions of Claudio Monteverdi's Il ritorno d'Ulisse in patria at the Lisbon Opera House and The Coronation of Poppea at the English National Opera.

== Education ==
The Sixteen have an education programme and projects have included a series of school matinées for hundreds of primary school children in Bury St Edmunds, Liverpool and Southwell under the national Sing Up initiative. The Sixteen also have close ties with the Guildhall School of Music and Drama and Trinity College of Music, offering opportunities for young people about to embark on careers as professional musicians.

The group leads a training programme for 18–23 year olds, Genesis Sixteen, which aims to nurture the next generation of young singers through an annual series of vocal courses, mentoring and masterclasses.

== Discography ==
Over 90 recordings reflect the Sixteen's range of work, spanning the music of 500 years and winning many awards including the Grand Prix du Disque, numerous Schallplattenkritik, a Gramophone Award (Early Music, 1992), the Classical Brit Award in 2005 for Renaissance and IKON, which was nominated for a Grammy Award and two Classical Brits. These latter two discs were recorded as part of the group's contract with Universal Classics and Jazz.

Since 2001, the Sixteen have had their own record label, CORO, which has released over 90 titles to date. More recent recordings include Handel's oratorio Messiah, with soloists Carolyn Sampson, Catherine Wyn-Rogers, Mark Padmore and Christopher Purves (winner of a MIDEM Classical Award 2009), Dixit Dominus featuring Handel's eponymous early work and Steffani's Stabat Mater, Ceremony and Devotion: Music for the Tudors, which accompanied the 2010 Choral Pilgrimage, and Hail, Mother of the Redeemer which accompanied the 2011 Choral Pilgrimage.

A selection of recordings by The Sixteen
Year	Album	Label	Detail
1985	Handel: The Messiah	Erato	With the Amsterdam Baroque Orchestra and Ton Koopman
1987	Christmas Music from Medieval and Renaissance Europe	Hyperion	Conductor: Harry Christophers
1990	The Rose and The Ostrich Feather: Eton Choirbook Volume 1	CORO	Conductor: Harry Christophers
1993	The Flower of all Virginity: Eton Choirbook Volume IV	CORO	Conductor: Harry Christophers
1995	Esther (1718 version)	CORO	Conductor: Harry Christophers
2006	Philip & Mary: A Marriage of England & Spain	CORO	Conductor: Harry Christophers
2007	A Mother’s Love - Music for Mary	Universal Classics	Conductor: Harry Christophers
2009	Sounds Sublime	CORO	Conductor: Harry Christophers
2011	James MacMillan: Miserere	CORO	Conductor: Harry Christophers
2012	The Earth Resounds	Classic FM	Conductors: Harry Christophers, Eamonn Dougan
2012	Selva Morale e Spirituale Vol II: Monteverdi	CORO	Conductor: Harry Christophers
2012	Allegri: Miserere	Classic FM	Conductor: Harry Christophers
2012	Pärt: De Profundis	Decca	With Gabrieli Consort and Paul McCreesh
2013	Bartlomiej Pekiel	CORO	Conductor: Eamonn Dougan
2014	The Blossoming Vine: Italian Maestri in Poland	CORO	Conductor: Eamonn Dougan
2015	Flight of the Angels	CORO	Conductor: Harry Christophers
2016	Helper and Protector: Italian Maestri in Poland	CORO	Conductor: Eamonn Dougan
2017	Marcin Mielczewski	CORO	Conductor: Eamonn Dougan
2017	James MacMillan: Stabat Mater	CORO	With Britten Sinfonia
2021	Good Night, Beloved	CORO	Conductor: Harry Christophers
2022	An Old Belief	CORO	Conductor: Harry Christophers
2022	Byrd: Psalmes, Songs and Sonnets (1611)	CORO	With Fretwork
2022	A Meditation	CORO	Conductor: Harry Christophers
2023	Sirens’ Song	CORO	Conductor: Harry Christophers
2023	Coronation: Music for Royal Occasions	CORO	Conductor: Harry Christophers
2023	A Watchful Gaze	CORO	Conductor: Harry Christophers

== See also ==
- The Clerks
- Hilliard Ensemble
- I Fagiolini
- Tallis Scholars
- Handel and Haydn Society
