= List of compositions by Thomas Tallis =

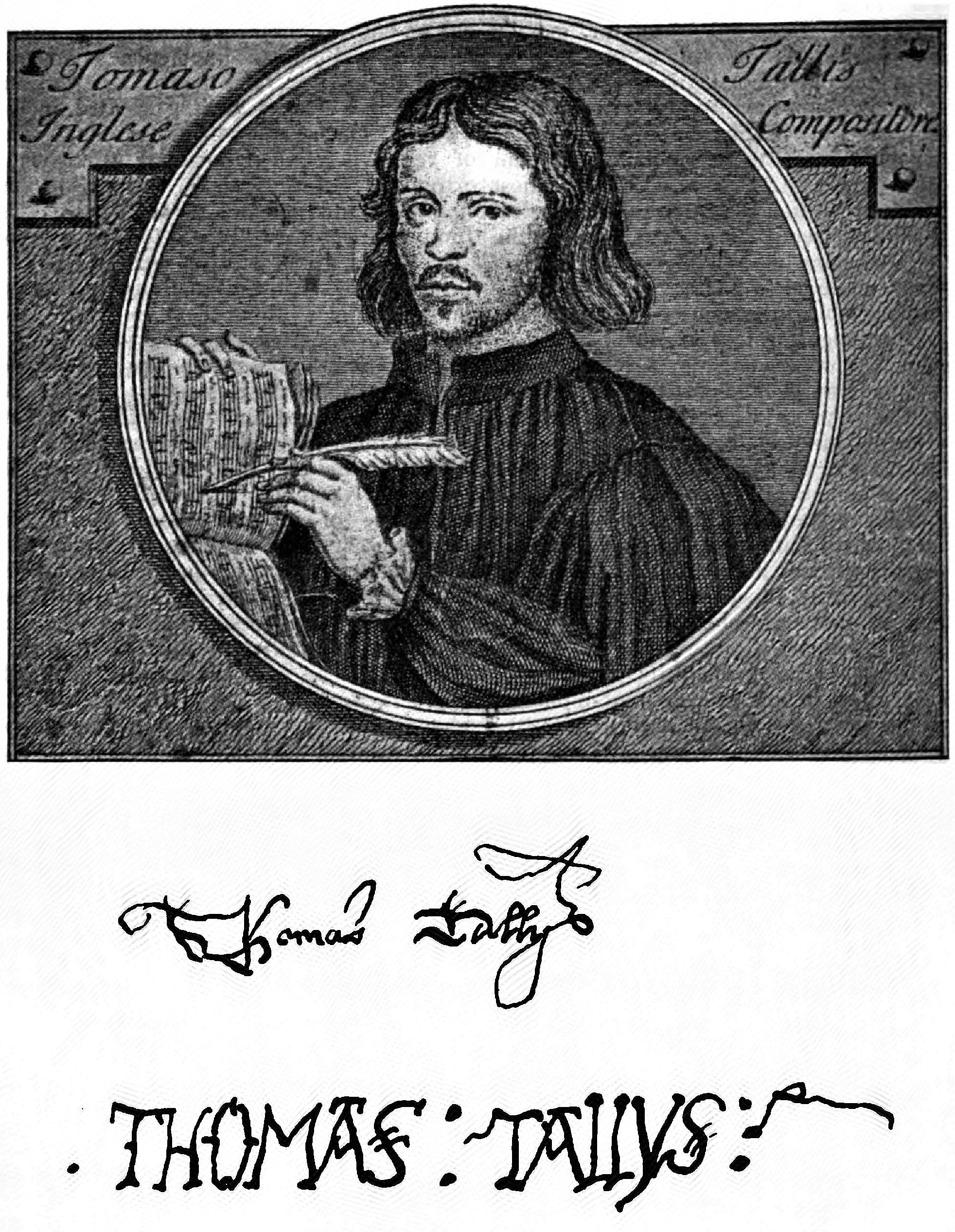
Thomas Tallis, 18th-century engraving; a posthumous, invented portrait by Gerard Vandergucht

This is a list of compositions by Thomas Tallis (c. 1505–1585).

== Masses ==
- Missa Salve intemerata (Kyrie is modern, tenor part throughout is reconstructed, Sanctus and Agnus Dei alto part is reconstructed)
- Mass for Four Voices
- Missa Puer natus est nobis (on the chant) (Sanctus and Agnus Dei require reconstruction, Credo is lost except for the "Et expecto" phrase)

=== Mass fragments ===
- Et in terra pax (?) (mass fragment)
- Domine Deus rex caelestis (?) (mass fragment)
- Et exspecto resurrectionem mortuorum (mass fragment)
- Kyrie: Deus Creator (mass fragment) (contrafactum of Hear The Voice And Prayer)

== Latin motets, responsories and antiphons ==
- Absterge Domine
- Aeterne rex altissime (?)
- Audivi vocem de Coelo (Responsory for Matins)
- Ave Dei Patris filia (Votive antiphon)
- Ave rosa sine spinis (Votive antiphon)
- Ave mulierum sanctissima (?) (Votive antiphon)
- Derelinquat impius
- Domine, quis habitabit
- Dum transisset Sabbatum (Responsory for Matins)
- Euge caeli porta (Votive antiphon fragment)
- Gaude gloriosa Dei mater (Votive antiphon)
- Gaude sancte virgo (Votive antiphon fragment)
- Gloria Patri
- Haec Deum caeli
- Hic nempe mundi gaudia
- Hodie caelorum Rex (Responsory)
- Homo quidam fecit (Responsory)
- In ieiunio et fletu
- In manus tuas (Responsory for Compline)
- In pace in idipsum (Responsory for Compline)
- Jam Christus astra ascenderat (Vespers hymn)
- Jesu Salvator saeculi (Compline hymn)
- Lamentations of Jeremiah I
- Lamentations of Jeremiah II
- Laudate Dominum omnes gentes
- Loquebantur variis linguis (Responsory for Vespers)
- Mihi autem nimis
- Miserere nostri
- Miserere mihi Domine (?)
- O nata lux (Hymn for Lauds)
- O sacrum convivium
- O salutaris hostia
- Quod chorus vatum (Vespers hymn)
- Rex sanctorum (?)
- Salvator mundi I
- Salvator mundi II
- Salve intemerata virgo (Votive antiphon)
- Sancte Deus (Jesus antiphon)
- Sermone blando (Hymn for Lauds)
- Spem in alium nunquam habui
- Suscipe quaeso Domine
- Te lucis ante terminum (Ferial)
- Te lucis ante terminum (Festal)
- Tu fabricator omnium
- Videte miraculum (Responsory for Vespers)

== English service music ==
- Preces (1st Set)
- Preces (2nd Set)
- Christ Rising Again from the Dead
- Venite
- Te Deum
- Benedictus
- Responses And Collects For Easter Matins
- Litany I
- Litany II
- Magnificat
- Nunc Dimittis
- Responses And Collects For Christmas Eve Evensong
- Commandments
- Credo
- Offertory Sentence
- Sanctus
- Gloria

== English anthems ==
- O Lord, Give Thy Holy Spirit
- Purge Me, O Lord
- Verily, Verily I Say Unto You
- Remember Not, O Lord God
- O Lord, In Thee Is All My Trust
- Out From The Deep
- Remember Not, O Lord God
- Hear The Voice And Prayer
- If Ye Love Me
- A New Commandment
- Wherewithal Shall A Young Man
- O Do Well Unto Thy Servant
- My Soul Cleaveth To The Dust
- Not Every One That Saith Unto Me
- Wipe Away My Sins (contrafactum of Absterge Domine)
- Forgive Me, Lord, My Sin (contrafactum of Absterge Domine)
- Blessed Are Those That Be Undefiled
- Arise, O Lord, And Hear (contrafactum of O sacrum convivium)
- With All Our Hearts (contrafactum of O sacrum convivium)
- I Call And Cry To Thee (contrafactum of O sacrum convivium)
- O Sacred And Holy Banquet (contrafactum of O sacrum convivium)
- When Jesus Went Into Simon The Pharisee’s House (contrafactum of Salvator mundi II)
- Blessed Be Thy Name (contrafactum of Mihi autem nimis)
- O Praise The Lord II
- Sing and Glorify Heaven's High Majesty (contrafactum of Spem in alium nunquam habui)
- All People That On Earth Do Dwell (?)
- O Lord Of Hosts, King Most Mighty (?)
- O Sing Unto The Lord A New Song (?)
- This Is My Commandment (?)
- The set of nine vernacular psalm settings referred to as the nine tunes for Archbishop Parker's Psalter
  - Man Blest No Doubt (Psalm 1)
  - Let God Arise In Majesty Psalm 68
  - Why Fum'th In Sight (Psalm 2, tune known as the third mode melody, see also Fantasia on a Theme of Thomas Tallis)
  - O Come In One To Praise The Lord (Psalm 95)
  - E'en Like The Hunted Hind (Psalm 42)
  - Expend, O Lord, My Plaint (Psalm 5)
  - Why Brag'st In Malice High (Psalm 52)
  - God Grant With Grace (Psalm 67, tune known as Tallis' Canon)
  - Ordinal (Veni Creator)

== Keyboard works ==
- Per haec nos
- Veni Redemptor gentium
- Jam lucis orto sidere
- Ecce Tempus idoneum
- Ex more docti mistico
- Clarifica me Pater (I)
- Clarifica me Pater (II)
- Clarifica me Pater (III)
- Gloria tibi Trinitas
- Iste Confessor
- Alleluia: Per te Dei genitrix
- Felix Namque (I)
- Felix Namque (II)
- Natus est nobis
- Lesson: Two Partes In One (?) (also attrib. to John Bull)
- Tu nimirum (from Salve intemerata)
- Lesson: Two Partes In One
- A Point

== Secular songs ==
- Like As The Doleful Dove
- O Ye Tender Babes
- As Caesar Wept (?)
- Bulschafft schadt neut (?)
- When Shall My Sorrowful Sighing Slake (?)
- Was tag und nacht (?)

== Consort music ==
- In Nomine I
- In Nomine II
- A Solfing Song / Je nilli croyss
- Salvator Mundi (trio)
- Fantasia
