= Blessed Be Thy Name =

Blessed Be Thy Name may refer to:

- "Blessed Be Thy Name", a hymn by William J. Kirkpatrick (1838–1921)
- "Blessed Be Thy Name", a composition by Thomas Tallis (c. 1505–1585)

== See also ==
- Hallowed Be Thy Name (disambiguation)
- Blessed Be Your Name (disambiguation)
