= Missa Puer natus est nobis =

Mass by Thomas Tallis

- Mass by Thomas Tallis
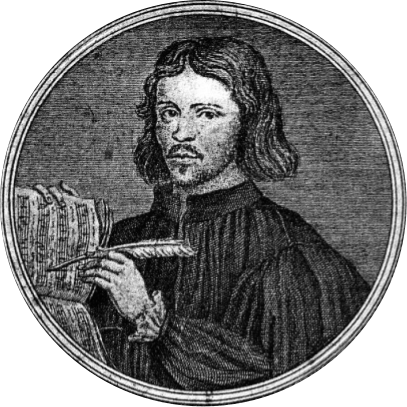
- Thomas Tallis, in an engraving by Gerard Vandergucht, after Niccolò Haym
- Occasion: In honour of Queen Mary I
- Composed: 1554
- Scoring: AATTBarBB or SSAATBB

Missa Puer natus est nobis is a mass setting for seven voices composed by Thomas Tallis. It is one of three complete masses by Tallis. It was sung by the joint Capilla Flamenca and Chapel Royal choirs in Christmas 1554, during which Philip of Spain was in England.

== Background ==
When Mary I ascended to the English throne in 1554, the Use of Sarum was restored and the English votive style was revitalised. Her marriage to Philip allowed for an artistic exchange between England and Spain, as Philip spent nearly two years in total in his wife's kingdom and brought his own singers with him, one famous example being Philippe de Monte. English composers were inspired to compose works in the Flemish style, or they were required to in order to accommodate how the Flemish singers were trained or what appealed the most to Philip aesthetically. Tallis, at the very height of his career as a composer, composed several 7-voiced pieces in the Flemish style for Philip's chapel: Loquebantur variis linguis, a responsory; Suscipe quaeso Domine, a non-liturgical motet celebrating the end of the English schism; and Miserere nostri, a complex "per Arsin et Thesin" augmentative prolation canon that is thought to have once been part of a larger psalm setting before its publication as an individual work some twenty years later. Tallis also composed a Missa pro defunctis, considered a very continental mass to compose before the Council of Trent, for Mary's funeral, although the setting has been lost in its entirety.

== Composition ==
The mass is based on a plainchant cantus firmus, Puer natus est nobis, which was appointed to be sung at the third mass of Christmas day and at the feast of the Circumcision according to the Sarum rite. This allows scholars to date its composition to Christmas of 1554, when Philip was in England and his singers were singing alongside the Chapel Royal for mass. Its cantus firmus, celebrating the birth of Jesus, is thought to allude to the birth of a male heir for England, as Mary believed she was pregnant at the time and was willing to convey it.

Like English mass settings from before the reformation, the mass does not have a Kyrie movement. Only one section of the Credo survives, the "Et expecto". The Sanctus and Agnus Dei also have missing bars in the alto and bass parts, which have been reconstructed by David Wulstan. The mass is in duple metre throughout. The music of the mass bears characteristics of both the English and Flemish traditions. The Flemish characteristics include the extensive use of homophony, the large number of voices and the slow-moving harmonies. The English characteristics include English cadences, a triple metre with transition into duple metre, and strict adherence to a cantus firmus "ground" which is sung in long notes in the tenor voice, rather than being paraphrased between the parts as in continental masses of the mid-16th century. The mass also has a head-motif that begins each movement which is not based on the cantus firmus.

=== Cantus firmus ===
The second tenor carries the cantus firmus "Puer natus est nobis". The note values are large, lasting many "longs" or breves. Harmonic modulations occur throughout the mass, yet the rate of modulation is slow as a result of the lengthy note values. Tallis compensates for moments where a single note in the tenor may last up to 31 bars by writing many imitations throughout the other parts, allowing for rhythmic creativity. He uses passing notes in the melodies (often upwards towards the key note) that create a "shimmer effect" throughout the texture. The end of the Agnus Dei is minimalist in approach, with repeating motifs over static harmony that creates a petering-out effect that word-paints for the phrase "Dona nobis pacem" (Grant us peace). Choral conductor Peter Philips describes the effect as "mantra-like".

Various note values of the cantus firmus have also been arranged by Tallis rhythmically to create a cryptic, puzzle-like pattern throughout. Milsom writes that the patterns are "almost cabbalistic", while Wulfstan suggests that Tallis' use of patterns actually resemble Ockeghem's mathematical "games" with cantus firmi. Kerman and Humphreys have identified that in some movements, the note value corresponds with a certain vowel within the word of the text being sung in the cantus firmus, although the procedure for this changes from movement to movement in an unknown sequence. Philips writes that the overall esoteric significance is "difficult to discern". The cantus firmus in the Sanctus also has a series of diminutions and repeats that randomly switch between prograde to retrograde.

== Reception ==
=== Popular culture ===
The Gloria of Missa Puer natus was arranged by Tangerine Dream for the soundtrack to The Keep (1983). Anachronistically, the Gloria is sung during Anne Boleyn's attempted assassination in The Tudors (2008).
