= Blessed Be Your Name =

Blessed Be Your Name may refer to:

- Blessed Be Your Name: The Songs of Matt Redman Vol. 1, 2005 album
- Blessed Be Your Name: The Hits, 2008 compilation album by Tree63
- Live Worship: Blessed Be Your Name, 2004 live album by Rebecca St. James
- "Blessed Be Your Name" (song), a song from the 2002 album Where Angels Fear to Tread by Matt Redman, covered by tree63 on their 2003 album The Answer to the Question, and the Newsboys in their 2004 album Devotion
- Blessed Be Your Name, a 2005 book by Matt and Beth Redman

== See also ==
- "Blessed Be Thy Name", a hymn by William J. Kirkpatrick (1838–1921)
- "Blessed Be Thy Name", a composition by Thomas Tallis (c. 1505–1585)
- Blessed Be Thy Name (disambiguation)
- Hallowed Be Thy Name (disambiguation)
