= Thomas Tallis =

English Renaissance composer (c. 1505–1585)

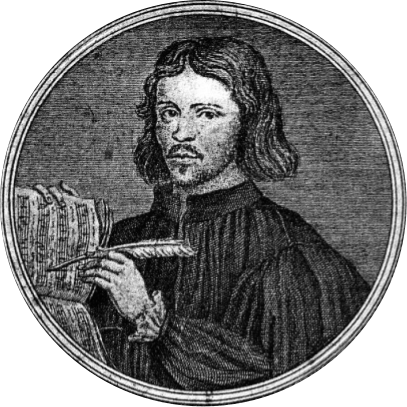
- Detail of an 18th-century posthumous engraving by Gerard Vandergucht, after Niccolò Haym
- Born: c. 1505; Probably Kent, England
- Died: 23 November 1585 (aged 79/80); Greenwich, England
- Works: List of compositions

Thomas Tallis (/ˈtælɪs/; also Tallys or Talles; c. 1505 – 23 November 1585 (Note: 3 December 1585 by the Gregorian calendar)) was an English composer of High Renaissance music. His compositions are primarily vocal, and he occupies a primary place in anthologies of English choral music. Tallis is considered one of England's greatest composers, and he is honored for his original voice in English musicianship.

== Life ==
=== Youth ===
No records about the birth, family, or childhood of Thomas Tallis exist, so almost nothing is known about his early life and origins. Historians have calculated that he was born in the early part of the 16th Century, toward the end of the reign of Henry VII of England. Estimates of his birth year range from 1500 to 1520. His only known relative was a cousin named John Sayer. As the surnames Sayer and Tallis both have strong connections with Kent, Thomas Tallis is usually thought to have been born somewhere in the county.

There are some suggestions that Tallis sang as a child of the chapel in the Chapel Royal, the same singing establishment that he joined as an adult. He was probably a chorister at the Benedictine Priory of St. Mary the Virgin and St. Martin of the New Work in Dover, where he was later employed, but it is impossible to know whether he was educated there. He may have sung at Canterbury Cathedral.

=== Career ===
Tallis served at court as a composer, teacher, and performer for Henry VIII, Edward VI, Mary I, and Elizabeth I. He was first designated as an organist at the chapel after 1570, although he would have been employed as an organist throughout his career.

He avoided the religious controversies that raged around him throughout his service to successive monarchs, although he remained, in the words of the historian Peter Ackroyd, an "unreformed Roman Catholic". Tallis was capable of switching the style of his compositions to suit each monarch's different demands. Tallis taught several composers, including William Byrd, who was later associated with Lincoln Cathedral; Elway Bevin, an organist of Bristol Cathedral and Gentleman of the Chapel Royal; and Sir Ferdinando Heybourne (aka Richardson), a favourite of Queen Elizabeth.

==== 1530s and 1540s ====
No record of Tallis related to his career exists before 1531, when he is named in the accounts of the Kent Benedictine house Dover Priory. He was employed there as the organist, responsible for directing chants from the organ. A "Thomas Tales" is named as the joculator organorum at the priory and received an annual payment of £2. The account notes that he was also responsible for the direction of six singing-boys. The priory was dissolved in 1535, but there is no surviving record of Tallis's departure.

Tallis's whereabouts are not known for the following several months until records show his employment at St Mary-at-Hill in London's Billingsgate ward. He was paid four half-yearly payments from 1536 to 1538, with the last payment being specified for services—as either a singer or an organist—for the year up to 25 March 1538.

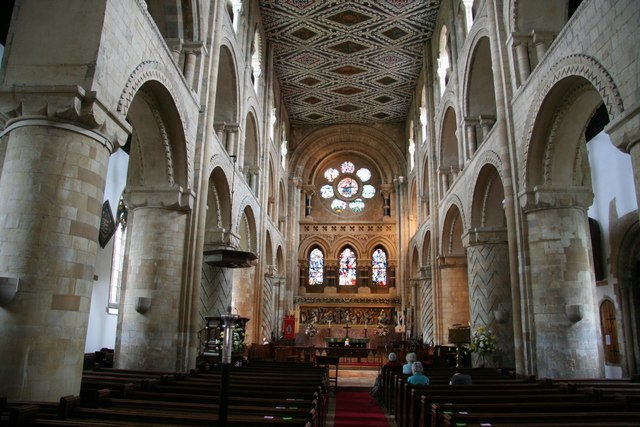
Around 1538, Tallis was appointed to serve at Waltham Abbey in Essex

Toward the end of 1538 Tallis moved to a large Augustinian monastery, Waltham Abbey in Essex, after he had come into contact with the abbot, whose London home was near to St Mary-at-Hill. At Waltham, Tallis became a senior member. When the abbey was dissolved in March 1540, Tallis left without receiving a pension because he had only recently been employed there; he was instead given a one-off payment of 40 shillings. He took away a volume of musical treatises copied by John Wylde, once a preceptor at Waltham. Among its contents was a treatise by Leonel Power that prohibited consecutive unisons, fifths, and octaves; the last page is inscribed with his name.

By the summer of 1540 Tallis had moved to the formerly monastic but recently secularised Canterbury Cathedral, where his name heads the list of singers in the newly expanded choir of 10 boys and 12 men. Tallis brought with him several manuscripts of his early votive works for frequent Sarum use. He remained there for two years.

==== Employment at the Chapel Royal ====
Tallis's employment in the Chapel Royal probably began in 1543. His name appears on a 1544 lay subsidy roll and is listed in a later document. It is possible that he was connected with the court when he was at St Mary-at-Hill; in 1577 Tallis claimed to have "served yo[u]r Ma[jes]tie and yo[u]r Royall ancestors these fortie yeres". He may have been responsible for teaching keyboard and composition to the boys of the choir. Tallis oversaw the will of Richard Bower, who was Master of the Children of the Chapel Royal.

Around 1552, Tallis married, probably for the first time, to Joan, the widow of a gentleman of the Chapel Royal. Like many other members of the royal household choir, Tallis and his wife lived in Greenwich, although it is not known if he ever owned his house there. He probably rented a house, by tradition in Stockwell Street. According to Tallis' epitaph and Joan Tallis' will, there were no children of the marriage. In the 1550s and 1560s, it is likely that William Byrd learned organ skills and some composition by Tallis ("bred up to Musick under Tho. Tallys"). Byrd kept a close relationship to Tallis, who was godfather to Byrd's second son Thomas.

Queen Mary I, who commissioned a Mass and several settings for Divine Office from Tallis, granted him a lease on a manor in Kent, which provided a comfortable annual income. He was present at the Queen's funeral on 13 December 1558 and at the coronation of Elizabeth I the following month. A setting of the Requiem composed by Tallis for the funeral of Queen Mary I has been lost.

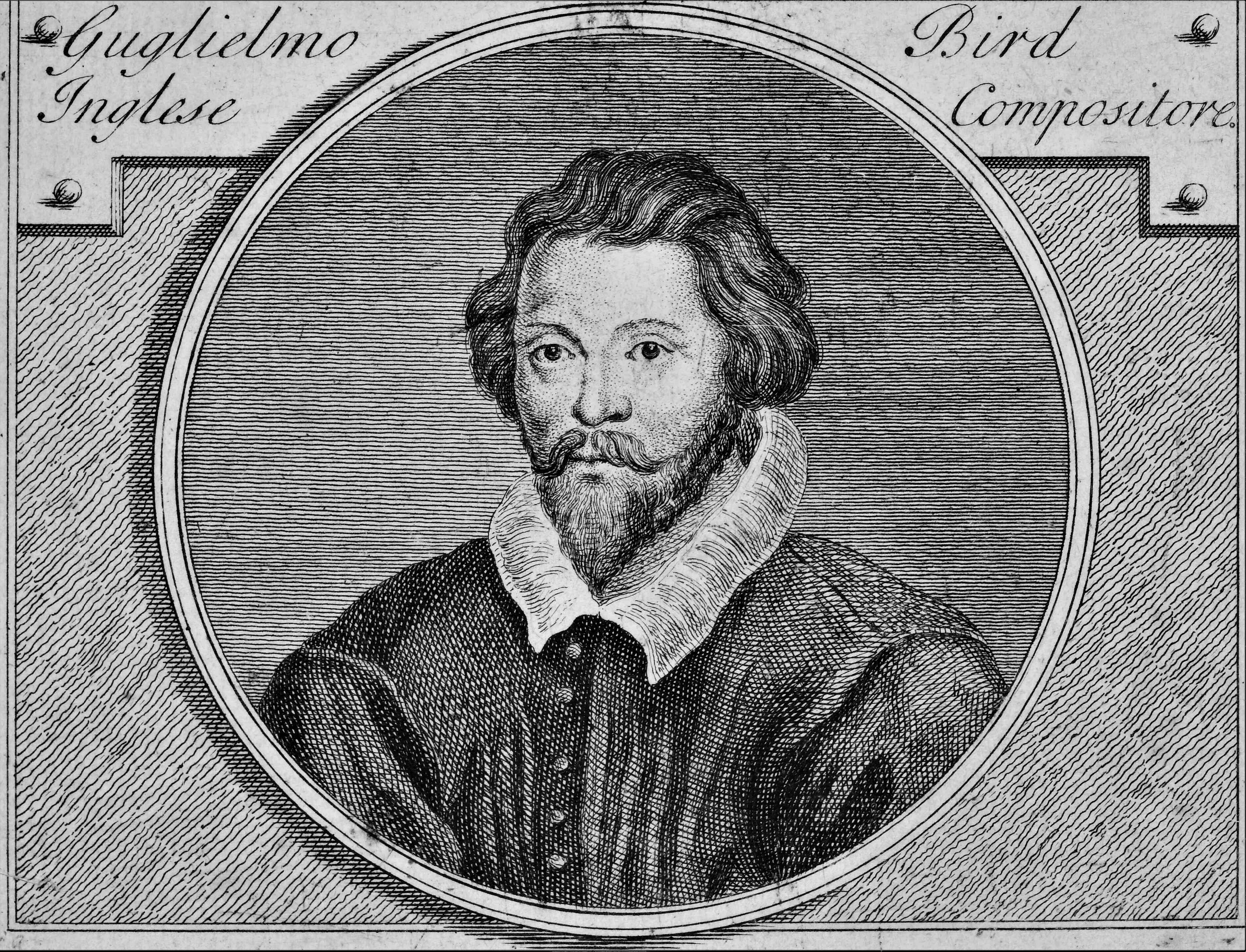
Tallis's pupil William Byrd

Tallis was an eminent figure in Elizabeth's household chapel, but as he aged he became gradually less prominent. In 1575, Elizabeth granted Tallis and Byrd a 21-year monopoly for polyphonic music and a patent to print and publish "set songe or songes in parts", one of the first arrangements of its kind in England. Tallis and Byrd were given exclusive rights to print any music in any language, including English, Latin, French, and Italian, and they had sole use of the paper used in printing music. The only publication made under the monopoly while Tallis was still alive was the 1575 Cantiones quae ab argumento sacrae vocantur. The piece was prefaced by Sir Ferdinando Heybourne, who wrote that Tallis and Byrd intended to take their place among the great composers of Europe, "Lassus, Gombert, and Ferrabosco". It did not sell well, and they were forced to appeal to Elizabeth for support. People were wary of the new publications, the sale of which was not helped by both men being Catholics. As Catholics, Byrd and Tallis were forbidden to sell imported music, and they were refused any rights to music fonts or printing patents not under their command. They lacked their own printing press. A second petition in 1577 resulted in the grant of a joint lease of crown lands to the two composers.

After the 1575 publication, Tallis is thought to have ceased active composition, as no works from these final years survive. The sombre Post-Exilic texts for Tallis' final surviving works of 1575, In Jejunio and Derelinquat Impius, indicate that Tallis was becoming increasingly involved with the recusant communities facing persecution, as was Byrd. One such community, the Paget Household, was known for its devout Catholicism until Thomas Paget's attainting in 1587, and it was a musical centre where "songes of Mr Byrdes and Mr Tallys’ were sung." Thomas Tallis was closely associated with the wealthy recusant Anthony Roper, who was the grandson of Sir Thomas More and the owner of the Theewes Claviorganum.

=== Final years ===
Late in his life, Tallis lived in Greenwich, possibly close to the royal Palace of Placentia; tradition holds that he lived on Stockwell Street. He was recorded as a member of Elizabeth I's household in June 1585, and wrote his will in August that year. He died in his house in Greenwich on 20 or 23 November; the different dates are from a register and the Chapel Royal. In his will he left £3.6s.8d. to "my company the gentlemen of Her Majesty's Chapel towards their feast." Thomas Byrd received Tallis' share of the monopoly although it was his father, William Byrd, who would utilise it.

He was buried in the chancel of St Alfege Church, Greenwich. A brass memorial plate placed there after the death of his wife (but before the death of Elizabeth is now lost. His remains may have been discarded by labourers during the 1710s, when the church was rebuilt.

Tallis' epitaph on a brass plaque, lost in the subsequent rebuilding of the church, was recorded by the English clergyman John Strype in his 1720 edition of John Stow's Survey of London It was most likely written by Henry Stanford: a recusant tutor to the Paget Household.

Entered here doth ly a worthy wyght,
Who for long tyme in musick bore the bell:
His name to shew, was THOMAS TALLYS hyght,
In honest virtuous lyff he dyd excell.

He serv'd long tyme in chappel with grete prayse
Fower sovereygnes reygnes (a thing not often seen);
I meane Kyng Henry and Prynce Edward's dayes,
Quene Mary, and Elizabeth oure Quene.

He mary'd was, though children he had none,
And lyv'd in love full thre and thirty yeres
Wyth loyal spowse, whose name yclypt was JONE,
Who here entomb'd him company now beares.

As he dyd lyve, so also did he dy,
In myld and quyet sort (O happy man!)
To God ful oft for mercy did he cry,
Wherefore he lyves, let deth do what he can.

On learning of Tallis' death, William Byrd wrote Ye Sacred Muses, his musical elegy to his colleague and mentor. Tallis' widow Joan, whose will is dated 12 June 1587, survived him by nearly four years and spent the rest of her life in the care of Richard Cranwell, a gentleman of the Chapel Royal. Anthony Roper received Tallis' gilt cup in Joan's will for the "good favours showed to [her] late husband" and William Byrd received Tallis' gilt bowl.

== Works ==
=== Early works and Gaude gloriosa ===
The earliest surviving works by Tallis are Alleluia: Ora pro nobis, Euge Caeli Porta, Magnificat for four voices, and three devotional antiphons to the Virgin Mary: Salve intemerata, a precocious work of Tallis, with the oldest manuscript dating to the 1520s (London, British Library, Ms. Harley 1709); Ave Dei Patris filia; and Ave rosa sine spinis. Votive antiphons were sung in the evening after the last service of the day. Tallis' early output is composed entirely in the English Votive Style that was cultivated in England from the 1470s to the 1540s. Tallis used antiphons composed by John Taverner and Robert Fayrfax as models for composing his own antiphons. Taverner in particular is quoted in Salve intemerata, and Dum transisset sabbatum. Characteristics of the votive style, such as high, sustained treble lines and lengthy solo verses, were just beginning to be supplanted by the more succinct phrasing of continental traditions by the 1530s, making Missa Salve Intemerata (Tallis' first of three complete masses, and his only parody mass to be completed) more modern in technique than the antiphon from which it is derived.

Gaude gloriosa Dei mater was previously thought to have been one of many revivalist votive antiphons composed in honour of Queen Mary I, in a similar vein to William Mundy's Vox Patris caelestis. This is due to Gaude gloriosa being more advanced than the rest of Tallis' early output, indicating the work of an older, more mature composer. However, Gaude gloriosa's dating was revised after renovations at Corpus Christi College, Oxford in 1978 revealed earlier fragments of Gaude gloriosa that use an English text translated by Queen Katherine Parr. This means the antiphon was likely composed in the 1540s, or even earlier, with its original Latin text referencing the "Gaude" Window in the west transept of Canterbury Cathedral. The cathedral was Tallis' previous workplace before his appointment to the Chapel Royal. It was only after becoming a Gentleman of the Chapel Royal that Tallis received his commission for Gaude gloriosa's English contrafactum, Se Lord and behold, which was intended for use in Henry VIII's French campaign and the capture of Boulogne in 1544.

At Canterbury Cathedral, Thomas Tallis was caught between Archbishop Thomas Cranmer's push for reform, and resistance from the more conservative members of the cathedral's chapter. Cranmer recommended a syllabic style of music where each syllable is sung to one pitch, as his instructions make clear for the setting of the 1544 English Litany. As a result, the writing of Tallis became more simple. Tallis' Mass for Four Voices, while in Latin, is written in syllabic homophony, with a diminished use of melisma.

=== Music under Edward VI and Mary I ===
"Loquebantur variis linguis"
Loquebantur variis linguis, a 7 voice responsory. Performed here by the Tudor Consort.

The reformed Anglican liturgy was inaugurated during the short reign of Edward VI (1547–1553), and Tallis began to write anthems set to English words, as well as services for the Book of Common Prayer. Tallis' English setting for the Benedictus stylistically dates from this period, although it remained in use as Byrd quoted Tallis' "which hath bene since the world began" melody in his own Great Service. Tallis' famous If ye love me certainly dates from the reign of Edward VI, as the Wanley Partbook of 1549–1552 is the earliest source for the anthem.

Queen Mary set about undoing some of the religious reforms of the preceding decades, following her accession in 1553. Mary restored the Sarum Rite, and the compositional style of the Chapel Royal reverted to the votive style prevalent early in the century, albeit in a form even more steeped in continental practices than that emerging in the 1530s. The marriage between Mary and Prince Philip of Spain allowed for a new artistic exchange between England and Spain. Philip's chapel choir accompanied him to England in 1554. Therefore, Tallis was exposed to visiting continental composers, as evident in Suscipe quaeso Domine, which is a non-liturgical 7-voice motet composed to celebrate the end of the English schism. Suscipe quaeso is written in a low-pitched Flemish style to suit the singing tradition of Philip's choir. Loquebantur variis linguis and Miserere nostri have the same 7-voice-scoring, meaning that they were also composed with Philip's singers in mind. Miserere nostri is notably written in the complex canonical technique of the continent with its use of multiple augmentative prolations.

Missa Puer natus est nobis, likely composed in December 1554 for the both chapel choirs, is more conservative in that it is composed around a festive cantus firmus "Puer natus est nobis" that alludes to the birth of a boy for England. Queen Mary believed she was pregnant from 1554-1555, and that the Catholic succession was to be secured, hence the large, celebratory scale of Missa Puer natus. The mass has characteristics of the English votive style, such as cross-relations, yet the mass also has characteristics of the Flemish tradition. In the tenor part, there are cryptic, puzzle-like patterns made from the varying note lengths with which Tallis modified the cantus firmus. Milsom writes that the patterns are "almost cabbalistic", while Wulfstan suggests that Tallis' use of patterns actually resemble Ockeghem's mathematical "games" with cantus firmi. Philips writes that the overall esoteric significance is "difficult to discern".

Some of Tallis' keyboard works were compiled by Thomas Mulliner in a manuscript copybook called The Mulliner Book before Queen Elizabeth's reign, and may have been used by the queen herself when she was younger. Following Elizabeth's accession, the Act of Uniformity abolished the Roman Liturgy[./Thomas_Tallis#cite_note-FOOTNOTEFarrell2001125-4 [3]] and firmly established the Book of Common Prayer. Composers resumed writing English anthems, although the practice continued of setting Latin texts among composers employed by Elizabeth's Chapel Royal.

"Why fum'th in sight", the Third Tune from Archbishop Parker's Psalter (1567)
Inspiration for Fantasia on a Theme by Thomas Tallis by Ralph Vaughan Williams. Performed by Phillip W. Serna, Treble, Tenor & Bass Viols

=== Matthew Parker's Psalter and Early Elizabethan works ===
"Tallis's Canon"
A version of "Tallis's Canon" as modified by Thomas Ravenscroft, here used for Thomas Ken's hymn "All praise to You, my God, this night" (which ends with a doxology).

"If Ye Love Me"
A setting of John 14:15–17

Lamentations of Jeremiah the Prophet I
A setting of Lamentations 1

The religious authorities at the beginning of Elizabeth's reign, being Protestant, tended to discourage polyphony in church unless the words were clearly audible or, as the 1559 Injunctions stated, "playnelye understanded, as if it were read without singing". Tallis wrote nine psalm chant tunes for four voices for Archbishop Matthew Parker's Psalter published in 1567. One of the nine tunes was the "Third Mode Melody" which inspired the composition of Fantasia on a Theme by Thomas Tallis by Ralph Vaughan Williams in 1910. Another of the tunes, a setting of Psalm 67, became known as "Tallis's Canon". A version of it published by Thomas Ravenscroft was used as the tune for Thomas Ken's "All praise to thee, my God, this night".

The Injunctions, however, also allowed a more elaborate piece of music to be sung in church at certain times of the day. Tallis' more complex Elizabethan anthems and motets may have been sung in this context, or alternatively by the many families who sang sacred polyphony at home. Although older works from the reigns of Henry and Queen Mary continued to be copied and distributed, the votive style was superseded by a modern, highly-imitative method of counterpoint, typical of late sixteenth-century choral traditions. Tallis' better-known works from the Elizabethan years that employ this method include his settings of the Lamentations of Jeremiah the Prophet for the Holy Week, the motet O nata lux, and Spem in alium.

Spem in alium is written for eight five-voice choirs, and is thought to have been commissioned by the Earl of Arundel upon hearing a secret performance of Alessandro Striggio's Missa sopra Ecco sì beato giorno or his 40-part motet, Ecce beatam lucem. Spem in alium takes its text from the apocryphal Book of Judith that concerns the slaying of Holofernes in order to save Israel. Milsom proposes the notion that the Arundel or the Duke of Norfolk, both of whom had Catholic leanings, with the latter implicated in the Ridolfi plot, might have commissioned the motet for a text that has covert political meaning, as an allegory for an eventual assassination of Elizabeth. Despite the allegorical association, and Spem in alium appearing in the Nonsuch palace catalogue for its presumed performance with Arundel and Norfolk in attendance, there is no evidence that Tallis was involved in the plot himself. Spem in alium has unique numerology: there are 40 voices for 40 days of Christ in the Desert, and the motet's length of 69 'longs' adds up to T-A-L-L-I-S in Latin letters.

=== Late Elizabethan works ===
Toward the end of his life, Tallis continued to innovate. Two large-scale keyboard works, Felix namque I and Felix namque II, can be found in the Fitzwilliam Virginal Book (FVB 109 & FVB 110) and are composed in a virtuosic manner unparalleled by any other European keyboard tradition of the period. Tallis' secular output increased towards the end of his compositional career, as he produced two In Nomines, a Fantasy, a Solfing Song (Ut-Re-Mi-Fa-Sol), one keyboard Lesson in Two Parts (also attrib. John Bull) and English songs such as When shall my sorrowful sighing slack? The latter was popular enough to appear in English and Scottish sources. O sacrum convivium and Salvator mundi may also have been written as secular fantasias for viols before being given liturgical texts for the 1575 Cantiones sacrae.

In the Baldwin Partbooks, two psalm settings survive from Tallis: Domine quis habitabit and Laudate Dominum omnes gentes. Domine quis habitabit is the longer of the two, and is written in the Flemish style. Laudate Dominum, while shorter, is written in a more sprung, lively Elizabethan style. Laudate Dominum made an impression on the young William Byrd, who used the motet as a model for his own Laudate pueri. Tallis was willing to draw upon his experience in adopting Flemish influences, while also retaining English character in his music through the use of English cadences.

Tallis was experimental in his final known compositions in the 1575 Cantiones sacrae: In jejunio has a high amount of word-painting, with the motet being purposely and unusually printed at a low pitch to reflect the sorrowful nature of the Lenten text. Derelinquat impius is simply bizarre in that it defies any initial tonal centre. Continuous peregrinations and eccentric seventh intervals at every "misericors est" convey the waywardness of the wicked in the text.

== Legacy ==
=== Influence and reputation ===
Tallis is remembered as primarily a composer of sacred vocal music, in part because of the small output of instrumental and secular music that can be successfully attributed to him. Records are incomplete on his works from previous periods; 11 of his 18 Latin-texted pieces from Elizabeth's reign were published, "which ensured their survival in a way not available to the earlier material". Tallis was never referred to as a "father of English Church music" in his lifetime (unlike Byrd, who was called a "Father of Musicke" in 17th-century chapel rolls); the epithet for Tallis was a product of the Victorian revival. Tallis, nevertheless, was highly revered, with John Baldwin, compiler of the Baldwin Partbooks, naming him as one of the greatest composers of the period, although giving much more deference to Mundy as one of the "Queen's Pallis". Some of Tallis' works were copied by a scribe of Edward Paston, who himself gifted copies to another musician and recusant, Sir John Petre. Byrd modelled his Great Service and Laudate pueri on earlier settings by Tallis. Although Tallis did progress with the continuing changes in English music, his surviving works became outdated by the English Madrigal period and the direct influence of Tallis' music waned. Thomas Morley, in his 1597 Plaine and Easie Introduction to Practicall Musicke, names "Fairfax, Taverner, Sheppard, Mundy, White, Parsons, W. Byrde" as equals to Lassus, and among the greatest composers of their day. Tallis has quite obviously been omitted.

Modern scholars generally believe that Tallis stood out among other important composers of the time, including Christopher Tye and Robert White. The author and composer Ernest Walker wrote that "he had more versatility of style" than Tye and White, and "his general handling of his material was more consistently easy and certain". John Milsom, musicologist and editor of early music scores, wrote that Tallis modified and revised his scores far more than John Sheppard and White, deliberately aligning later copies of his older works to a newer continental technique of imitative counterpoint. Dr. David Allenson, musicologist and performer, commented that Tallis' "[Spem in alium] is about twenty times better" than Striggio's 40-part motet because "where the Striggio is content to rely on big, harmonic effects and contrasts, Tallis' piece is a truly woven polyphonic piece of music". Also in 2005, Tess Knighton, musicologist and historian, wrote that Tallis was, "undoubtably a genius".

In 1971, the Thomas Tallis School in Kidbrooke opened, a mixed comprehensive school named after the composer.

=== Revival ===
Most of Tallis' music that remained in continuous use following his death was his music in the English language, mostly notably his Dorian Service, individual movement settings such as the Benedictus and Te Deum for means, two sets of responses, two double-chants and various other hymns, psalms and anthems for the Book of Common Prayer. It was only in the Victorian period, when interest in early music began to increase, that Spem in alium was rediscovered and began to be experimented with immediately. 20th century composers, such as Ralph Vaughan Williams and Herbert Howells, borrowed Tallis' themes for use in their own music. In the 1920s, the monumental series Tudor Church Music, produced with the support of the Carnegie Trust, revived Tallis' Latin music from across his career. R. R. Terry, chairman of the Carnegie trust at the time, pushed for the revival of Tudor church music in order to increase the choral repertoire for use at Westminster Cathedral.

Early music groups, such as the Clerkes of Oxenford and The Tallis Scholars, further contributed to interest in Tallis' Latin music. Chapelle du Roi recorded the complete works of Tallis in 2005 to celebrate 500 years since the estimated birth of Thomas Tallis. Alamire also recorded Se Lord and behold for their 2017 album Queen Katherine Parr and Songs of Reformation under the label Obsidian.

=== Appearance ===
No contemporaneous portrait of Tallis survives; the one painted by Gerard Vandergucht dates from 150 years after the composer's death, and there is no reason to suppose that it is a fair likeness. In a rare existing copy of his blackletter signature, he spelled his name "Tallys".

=== In popular culture ===
A fictionalised version of Thomas Tallis was portrayed by Joe Van Moyland in the 2007 Showtime television series The Tudors. In 2018, If ye love me was sung at the wedding of Prince Harry and Meghan, Duchess of Sussex.
