= Lamentations of Jeremiah the Prophet (Tallis) =

Musical composition by Thomas Tallis

- by Thomas Tallis
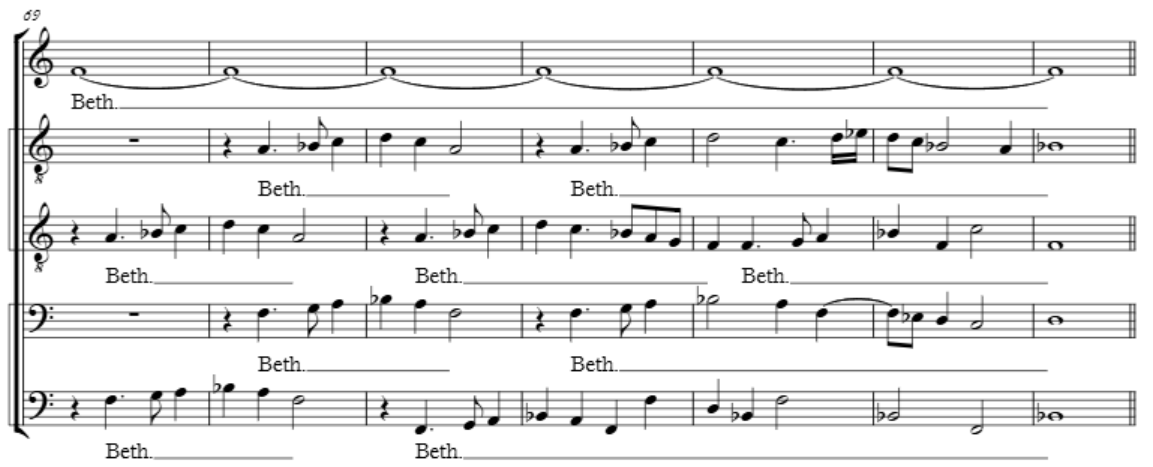
- The "Beth" letter setting. CCA 3.0 Complete Score by the Aoede Consort on IMSLP.org
- Genre: Renaissance Choral music
- Form: Motet
- Text: For Tenebrae
- Language: Latin
- Composed: c. 1560-1570
- Scoring: 5 voices a cappella

The Lamentations of Jeremiah the Prophet are two 5-part settings of the Lamentations composed by Thomas Tallis. H. B. Collins described the Lamentations in 1929 as Tallis's "crowning achievement", along with his 40-part motet Spem in alium.

== History ==
The Lamentations make up two settings, I and II, in the newer Caroline set of the Peterhouse Partbooks. I and II were likely intended to be sung separately but modern performers sometimes sing the two settings together, as the texts are succeeding verses of the Book of Lamentations. Tallis' Lamentations are part of a larger oeuvre of Lamentations settings produced by other English Catholic sympathisers (White, Byrd), for private home worship.

In the Victorian period, a revival in Tallis' music began and the Lamentations had a great appeal. In modern times, they are some of the most famous works by Tallis and among the most performed musical settings of the Lamentations. The first setting is a key piece of the Tallis Scholars repertoire.

== Analysis ==
Lamentations of Jeremiah the Prophet I
A setting of Lamentations 1

I and II are composed in two different modes and are generally in the new, highly-imitative Elizabethan style that had succeeded the older English votive style. The counterpoint is more austere than that of continental composers. However Commentators have remarked on how the Lamentations demonstrate Tallis' economy of means in composing less ornate polyphony in favour of textual clarity, word-painting and introspection. A tonal shift at the second "Plorans ploravit" (in I) create pathos, while successive cross-relations at "virgines eius squalidae" (in II) express indignation. At the final "convertere" verse in which Jeremiah prays for the restoration of Jerusalem, repetition of "Jerusalem" and frequent suspensions convey textual anguish.
