= Michael Vandergucht =

Flemish engraver and painter (c. 1660 – 1725)

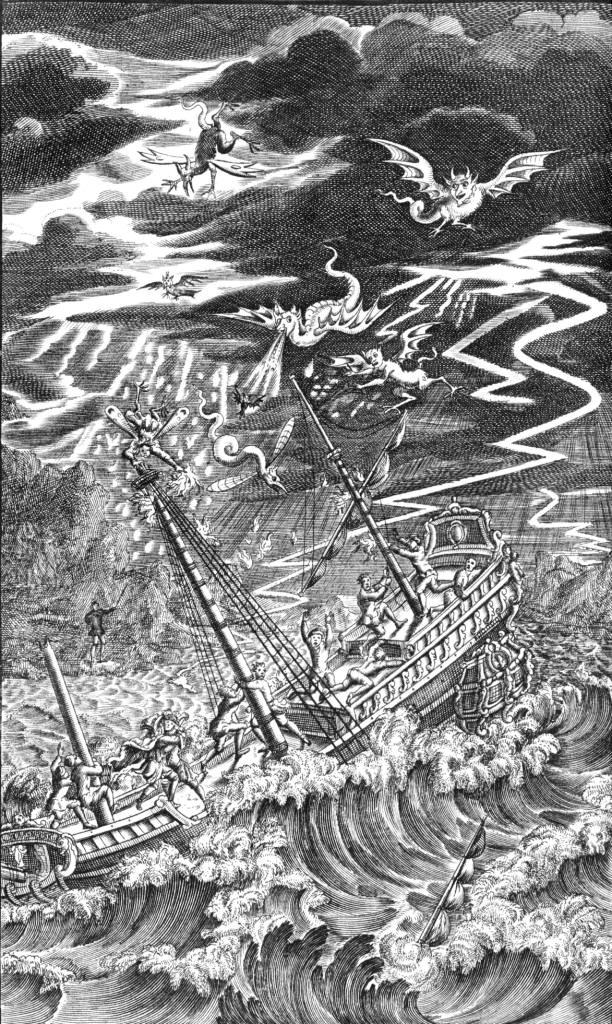
Illustration for Shakespeare's play The Tempest for Nicholas Rowe's Works of Mr. William Shakespear (1709).

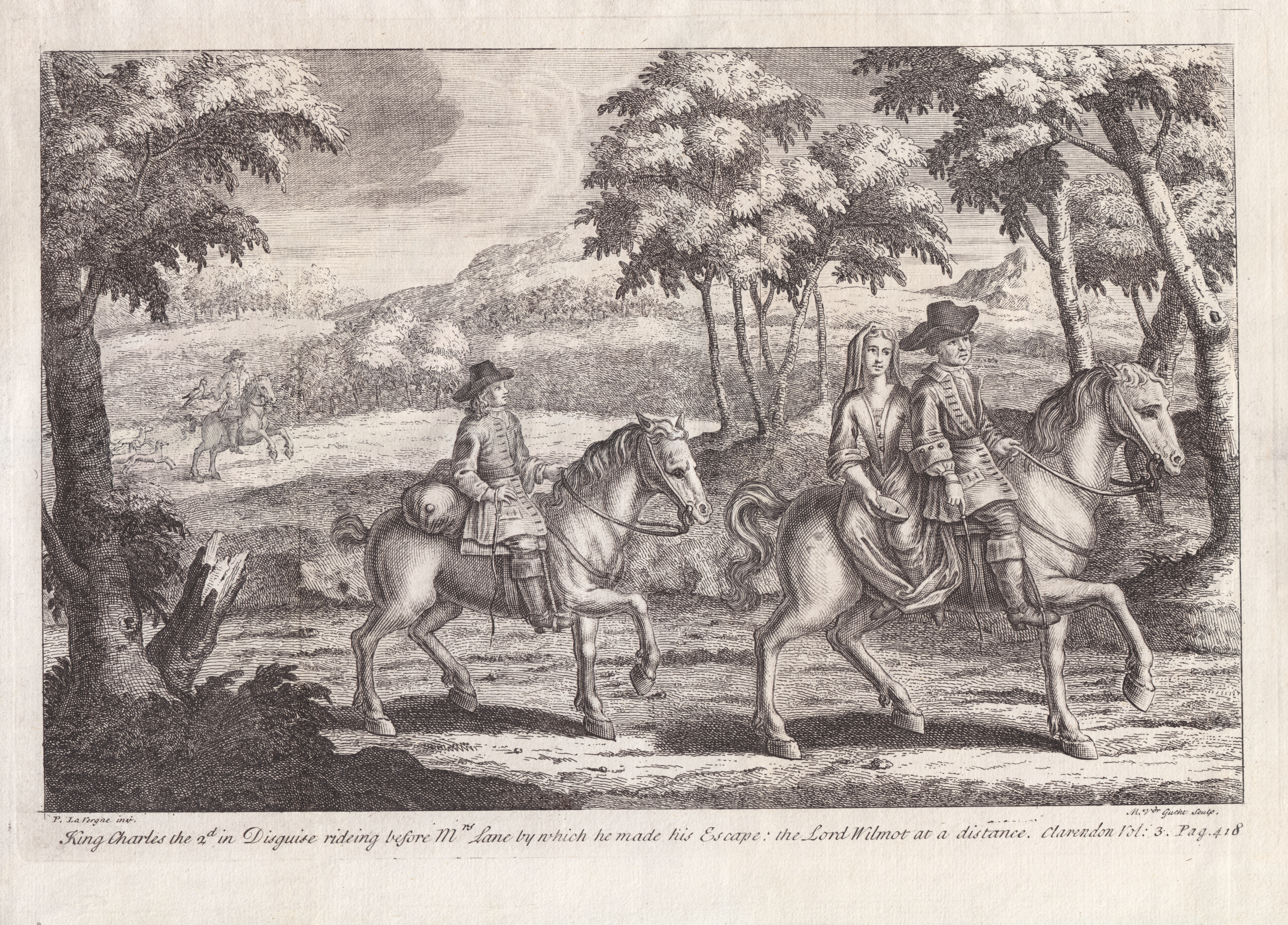
"King Charles the 2^{d} in Disguise rideing before M^{rs} Lane by which he made his Escape; the Lord Wilmor at a distance." from Clarendon's History of the Rebellion (1731 reprint)

Michael Vandergucht (née Michiel van der Gucht; c. 1660 – 16 October 1725) was a Flemish engraver and painter who worked for most of his career in England. He engraved portraits, book illustrations, and architectural prints and painted portraits.

== Life ==
Michiel van der Gucht was born in Antwerp, where he became a pupil of Frederik Bouttats the Younger. He was registered as an apprentice in the Antwerp artists' guild, the Guild of St Luke between 18 September 1672 and 18 September 1673. He is recorded in Amsterdam when, on 19 June 1682, he posted banns to marry Maria van Hogenbergh van Aerschot. He lived on the Rosengracht in Amsterdam.

He moved to England before July 1688. He trained his sons, Gerard Vandergucht (1696/97 — 1776) and Jan (John) Vandergucht (c. 1699 — c. 1730) and George Vertue and James Smith as engravers. His son Gerard became one of the leading engravers in London, following the French method of combining precise engraving with the etched tones. Gerard had 30 children of whom one, Benjamin, was a successful engraver, picture restorer and painter.

Michael Vandergucht died from gout in his house, the Golden Head in Queen Street, Bloomsbury, and was buried in the churchyard of St Giles-in-the-Fields.

== Work ==
He engraved portraits, book illustrations, and architectural prints and painted portraits. He kept to a restrained form of engraving, without etching. His figures often appear wooden and uninspired.

He provided many of the engravings for the first complete English translation of Andrea Palladio's I quattro libri dell'architettura published in London in 1715. Most plates in the publication are reverse-copies of those in the original edition, but with measurements corrected by its editor and publisher, Giacomo Leoni.
