= Fulham and Hammersmith Choral Society =

London-based choral society

- Choir
- Logo of Fulham and Hammersmith Choral Society
- Origin: Fulham, London, England, United Kingdom
- Founded: 1951
- Genre: Classical, sacred choral music
- Website: https://www.fhcs.org.uk

Fulham and Hammersmith Choral Society (FHCS) is a community choir based in Fulham and Hammersmith and Fulham in London, England. The choir performs a broad repertoire of choral music and presents three major concerts annually, typically at Easter, in the summer and at Christmas, often accompanied by professional orchestras and soloists. FHCS also participates in community events and fundraising activities.

== History ==
Fulham and Hammersmith Choral Society was established in 1951 as an amateur community choir and has grown into an ambitious ensemble of around 80–100 singers. Membership is open to all without formal audition, welcoming singers of varying levels of experience. Rehearsals are held weekly during school term time at The Olivier Centre, Lady Margaret School, Parson's Green, London.

The choir traditionally performs three major concerts each season, focusing on classical choral repertoire ranging from baroque and romantic works to contemporary compositions. It also supports local charities through fundraising performances and community singing events.

== Governance and charity status ==
Fulham and Hammersmith Choral Society is registered as a charity in England and Wales under registration number 801597. Its charitable objectives include the study, practice and performance of choral works and the furthering of public interest in choral music. The charity's activities encompass weekly rehearsals, public concerts, community events and educational outreach, as outlined in its trustees’ report.

The charity's trustees oversee its governance and ensure compliance with UK charity law and it operates through the work of volunteers, trustees and its musical director.

== Musical direction and key personnel ==
=== Musical directors ===
- Robert Patterson – Musical Director. Patterson has extensive experience directing choirs and holds performance diplomas in organ (FRCO) and piano (FRSM). His background includes roles such as principal organist at Canterbury Cathedral.

== Soloists and collaborators ==
Throughout its history, Fulham and Hammersmith Choral Society has collaborated with a variety of professional soloists, particularly for major choral works and themed concerts.

Notable soloists and guests who have appeared with FHCS include:

- Ben Thapa - tenor soloist known for his work with vocal ensemble G4 and solo vocal performances.
- Philippa Boyle – soprano soloist featured for opera choruses and aria performances with the choir.
- Graham Neal – tenor soloist in concerts such as *Rossini's Petite messe solennelle* with FHCS.
- Alexander Campkin – contemporary composer whose commissioned work *Man Cub* has featured in FHCS recordings and performances.
- Gavin Roberts – pianist and accompanist, frequently supporting soloist performances and concert programming for FHCS.
- Ralph Allwood MBE – renowned choral conductor and guest conductor for FHCS's Easter 2019 concert.

== Repertoire and notable performances ==
The choir's repertoire spans a wide range of choral literature, including classical masterworks and contemporary compositions.

=== Major choral works ===
FHCS has presented performances of well‑known choral masterpieces, often with orchestra and professional soloists. Recent and notable repertoire includes:

- Requiem by Gabriel Fauré – a staple of the choral repertoire, combining moments of serenity and reflection; FHCS has featured this work in their Christmas 2025 concert.
- Requiem by Karl Jenkins – a modern choral work juxtaposing traditional Latin texts with musical idioms ranging from jazz to world music and Japanese haiku.
- O nata lux by Morten Lauridsen – a luminous contemporary choral motet, often featured alongside larger choral works.

The choir's programmes also include standard oratorio works such as the Brahms A German Requiem and choral music from baroque to contemporary composers, reflecting a broad artistic scope.

== Community engagement and local performances ==
Fulham and Hammersmith Choral Society is active beyond its formal concert season, participating in community events and local cultural celebrations. The choir has performed at public gatherings linked with high-profile sporting and civic occasions, bringing choral music to broader audiences in West London. FHCS were featured as part of community celebrations surrounding the Rugby World Cup, supporting local singing initiatives connected to major national sporting events and encouraging community participation in music, performing to an audience of 90,000 at Wembley Stadium.

In addition to its concert season, the choir regularly performs at seasonal venues including Fulham Palace and local churches, singing traditional carols and choral works at festive events and charity fundraisers. It has taken part in Christmas Carol performances alongside other community ensembles, supporting local cultural programming in the borough.

FHCS also contributes to cultural enrichment initiatives such as 'Come & Sing' days, offering community members and visiting singers the opportunity to perform major choral works like Joseph Haydn's The Creation in a single day workshop format under the direction of its musical director. These events further the choir's mission of widening public access to choral music and engaging local singers of all backgrounds.

== Performances and venues ==
FHCS concerts are typically presented in churches and community venues across West London, including venues such as St Gabriel's Church, Pimlico and St Mary's Church, Putney. The choir also participates in outreach activities singing at local festivals and community events.
