= Lobt Gott, ihr Christen alle gleich =

German Christmas carol

- German Christmas carol by Nikolaus Herman
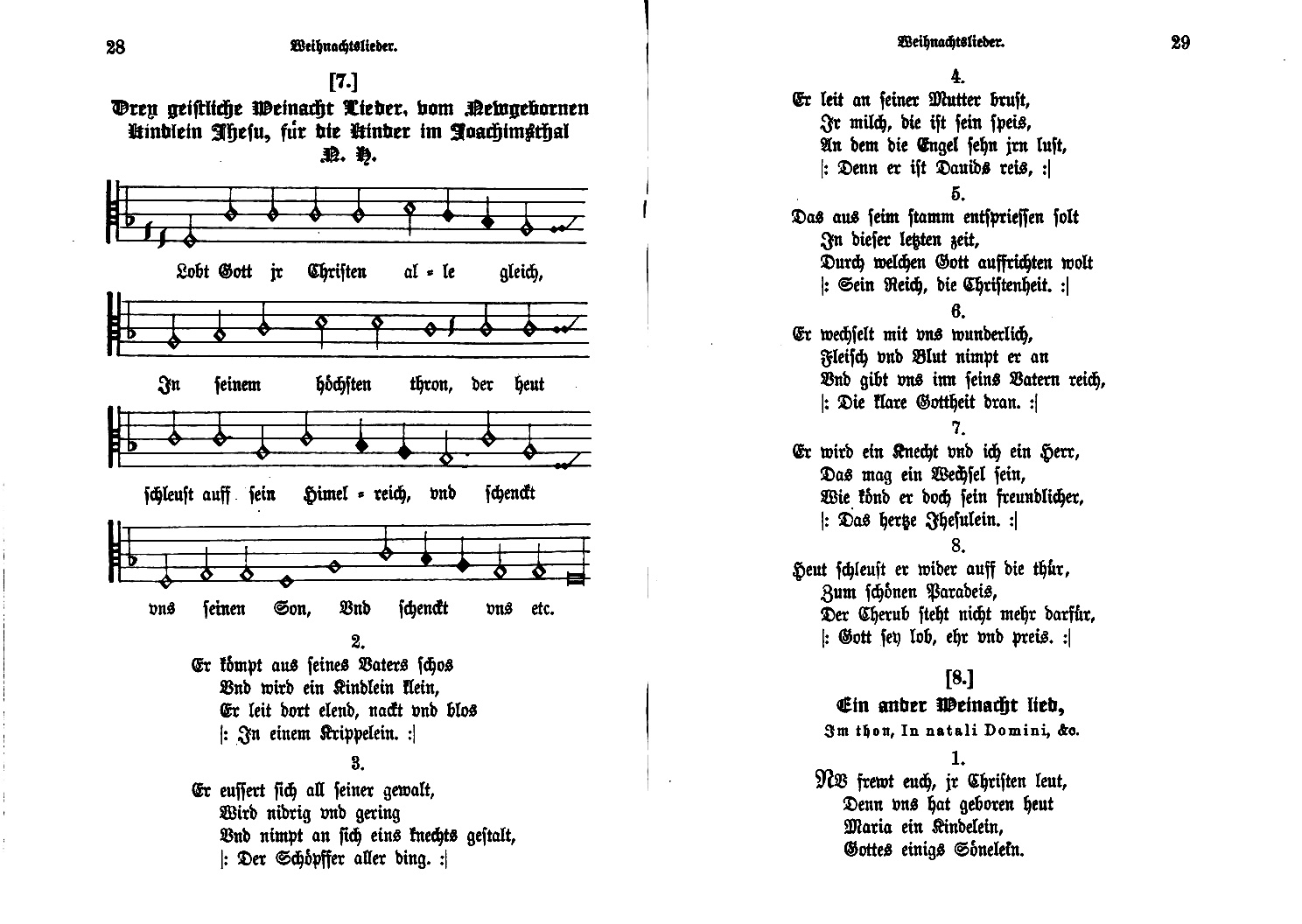
- Nikolaus Herman: "Lobt Gott, ihr Christen alle gleich", melody and text (1561, republished 1895)
- English: "Praise God the Lord, ye sons of men"
- Other name: "Lobt Gott, ihr Christen allzugleich"
- Catalogue: Zahn 198
- Text: by Herman
- Language: German
- Based on: Puer natus est nobis
- Published: 1560

"Lobt Gott, ihr Christen alle gleich" (Praise God, all Christians equally) is a German Christmas carol with lyrics and melody by Nikolaus Herman. It is part of Protestant and Catholic hymnals, has inspired musical settings, and has been translated. The title is also known as "Lobt Gott, ihr Christen allzugleich".

== History ==
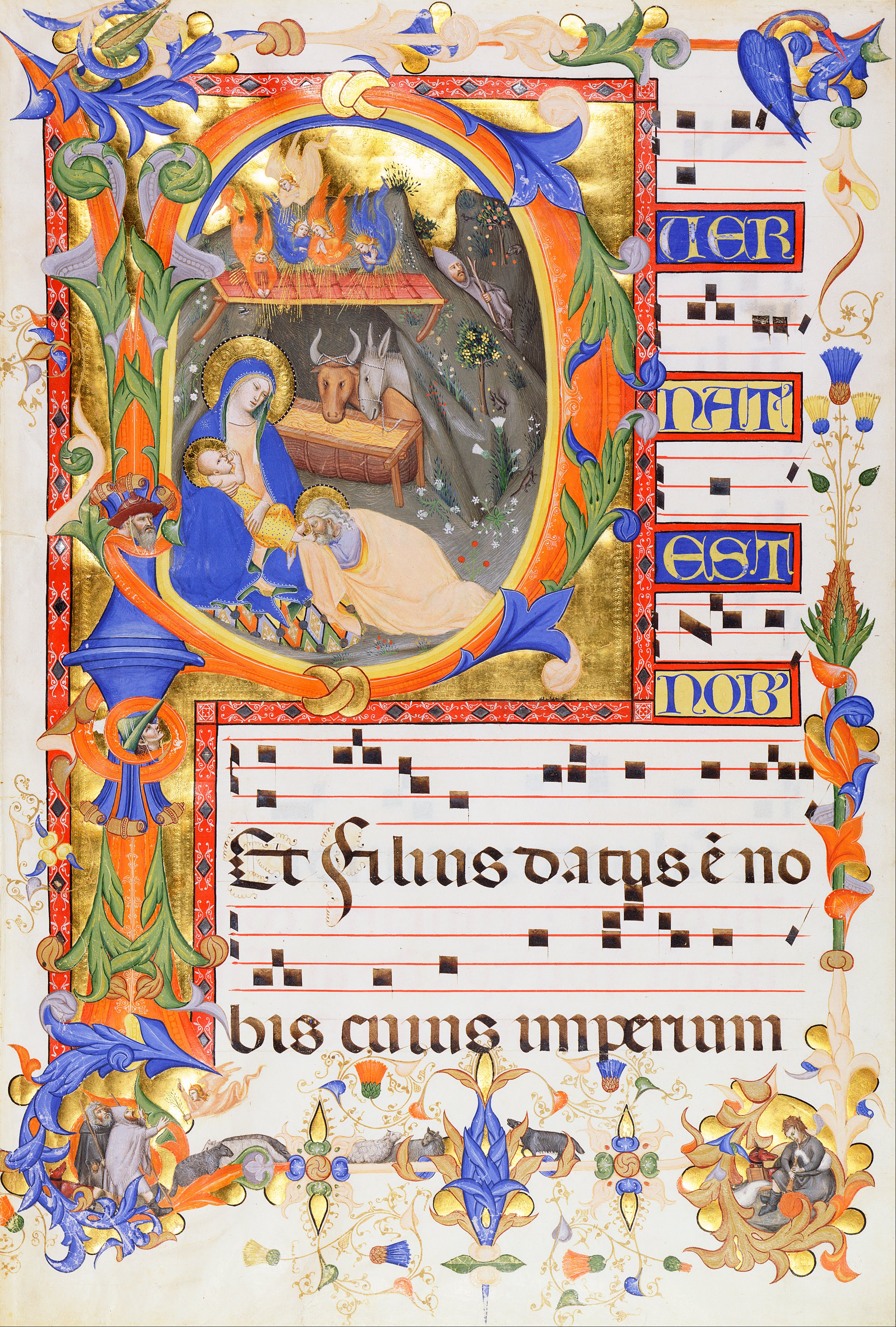
Puer natus est nobis in the codex Don Silvestro dei Gherarducci

The song is traditionally dated 1560, because it appeared then in eight stanzas with the melody, Zahn No. 198, in Wittenberg. The melody was connected before in 1554 with the text "Kommt her, ihr lieben Schwesterlein". An early version of text and melody appeared already around 1550 on a leaf ("Liedblatt") Drey geistliche Weyhnacht/ lieder, vom Newgebornen kindlin Jesu / für die kinder im Joachimstal (Three sacred Christmas songs, of the newborn little child Jesus / for the children in the Joachimstal).

Herman based the melody on the Gregorian introit antiphon for Christmas "Puer natus est nobis" (A boy is born for us"). The first line was often rendered as "Lobt Gott, ihr Christen allzugleich" from the beginning of the 17th century, which became the title of musical settings of the period. The hymn was translated by August Crull as "Praise God the Lord, ye sons of men". In the German Protestant hymnal Evangelisches Gesangbuch, the hymn was adopted as EG 27, with six stanzas (1, 2, 3, 6, 7 and 8), and in the Catholic hymnal Gotteslob as GL 247, with four stanzas (1, 2, 3 and 8).

== Musical setting ==
Johann Sebastian Bach composed a chorale prelude, BWV 609, in his Orgelbüchlein.

Michel Corrette composed a Noel Allemand on the theme

== Text and melody ==
Four stanzas, as in Gotteslob:

Lobt Gott, ihr Christen allzugleich,
in seinem höchsten Thron,
der heut schließt auf sein Himmelreich
|: und schenkt uns seinen Sohn. :|

Er kommt aus seines Vaters Schoß
und wird ein Kindlein klein,
er liegt dort elend, nackt und bloß
|: in einem Krippelein. :|

Er äußert sich all seiner G'walt,
wird niedrig und gering
und nimmt an eines Knechts Gestalt,
|: der Schöpfer aller Ding. :|

Heut schließt er wieder auf die Tür
zum schönen Paradeis;
der Cherub steht nicht mehr dafür.
|: Gott sei Lob, Ehr und Preis! :|

Praise God the Lord, ye sons of men,
Before His highest throne;
Today He opens heaven again
|: And gives us His own Son. :|

He leaves His heavenly Father's throne,
Is born an infant small,
And in a manger, poor and lone,
|: Lies in a humble stall. :|

He veils in flesh His power divine
A servant's form to take;
In want and lowliness must pine
|: Who heaven and earth did make. :|

He opens us again the door
Of Paradise today;
The angel guards the gate no more,
|: To God our thanks we pay. :|

== See also ==
- List of Christmas carols
