= Ferdinando Richardson =

English composer, musician, and courtier

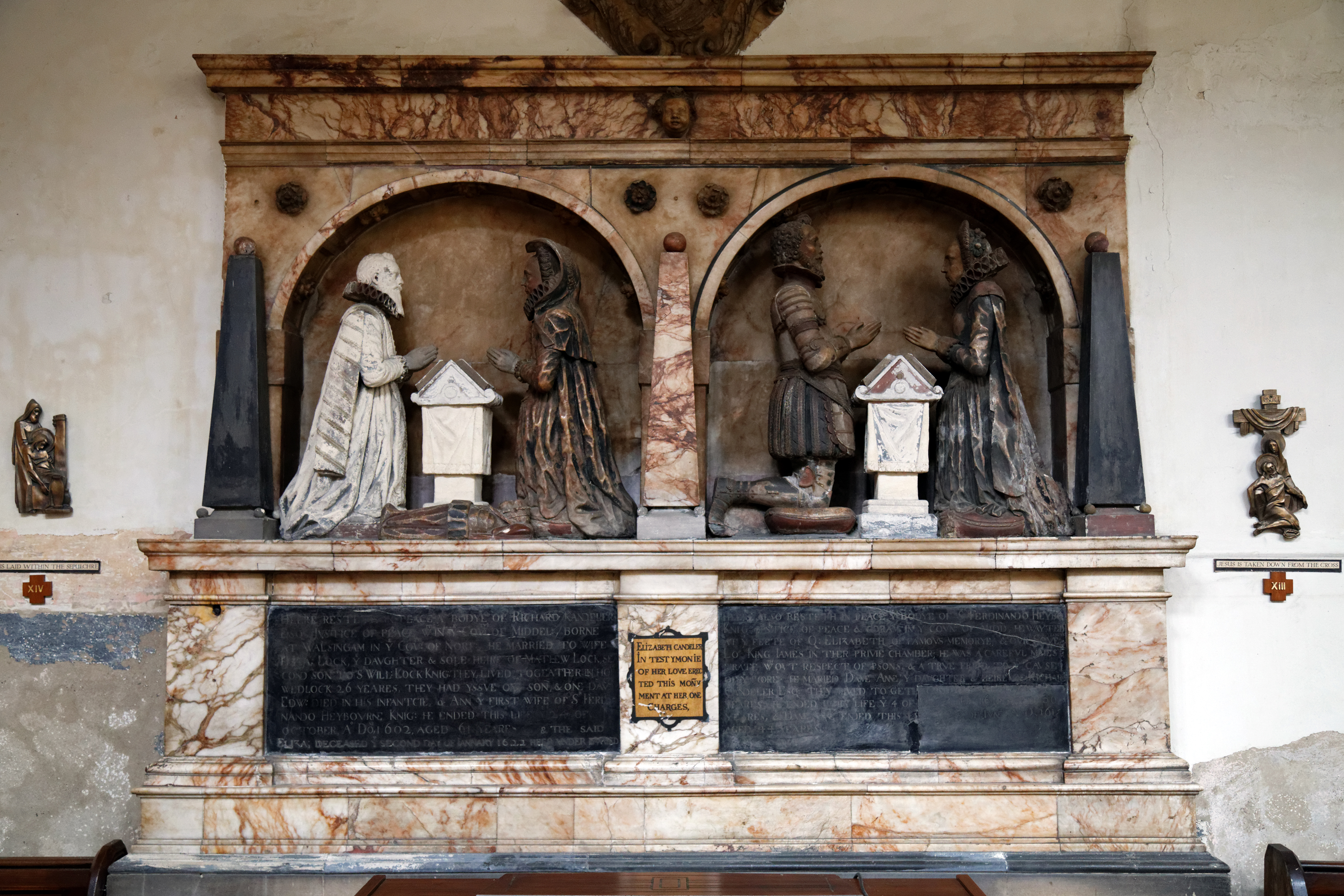
Ferdinando Heyborne monument (right), at All Hallows Church, Tottenham

Ferdinando Richardson (also known as Sir Ferdinando Heyborne) (c. 1558–1618) was an English composer, musician, and courtier.

He was a pupil of Thomas Tallis, and various works for the keyboard by him survive in the manuscript collection known as the Fitzwilliam Virginal Book. He wrote a letter to Sir Michael Hicks enclosing some exercises for the virginal for Hick's daughter in 1611. Her teacher was to copy the music and send back the original. He signed this letter "Fer: Heyborn."

As a courtier, Richardson held the post of Groom of the Privy Chamber under both Elizabeth I of England and James I of England. The epitaph on his family tomb, in All Hallows' Church, Tottenham, reads: "Here also resteth in peace the body of Sir Ferdinando Heyborne, Knight, justice of the peace and coram in the county of Middlesex. He waited at the feet of Queen Elizabeth of famous memory and our soveraign Lord King James in their privy chamber. He was a careful magistrate without respect of persons and a true friend to the cause of the poor."

A Complete Works for Harpsichord was recorded in 2013 by American keyboardist Glen Wilson for the Naxos label, receiving a 2014 Preis der deutschen Schallplattenkritik.
