= Great Service (Byrd) =

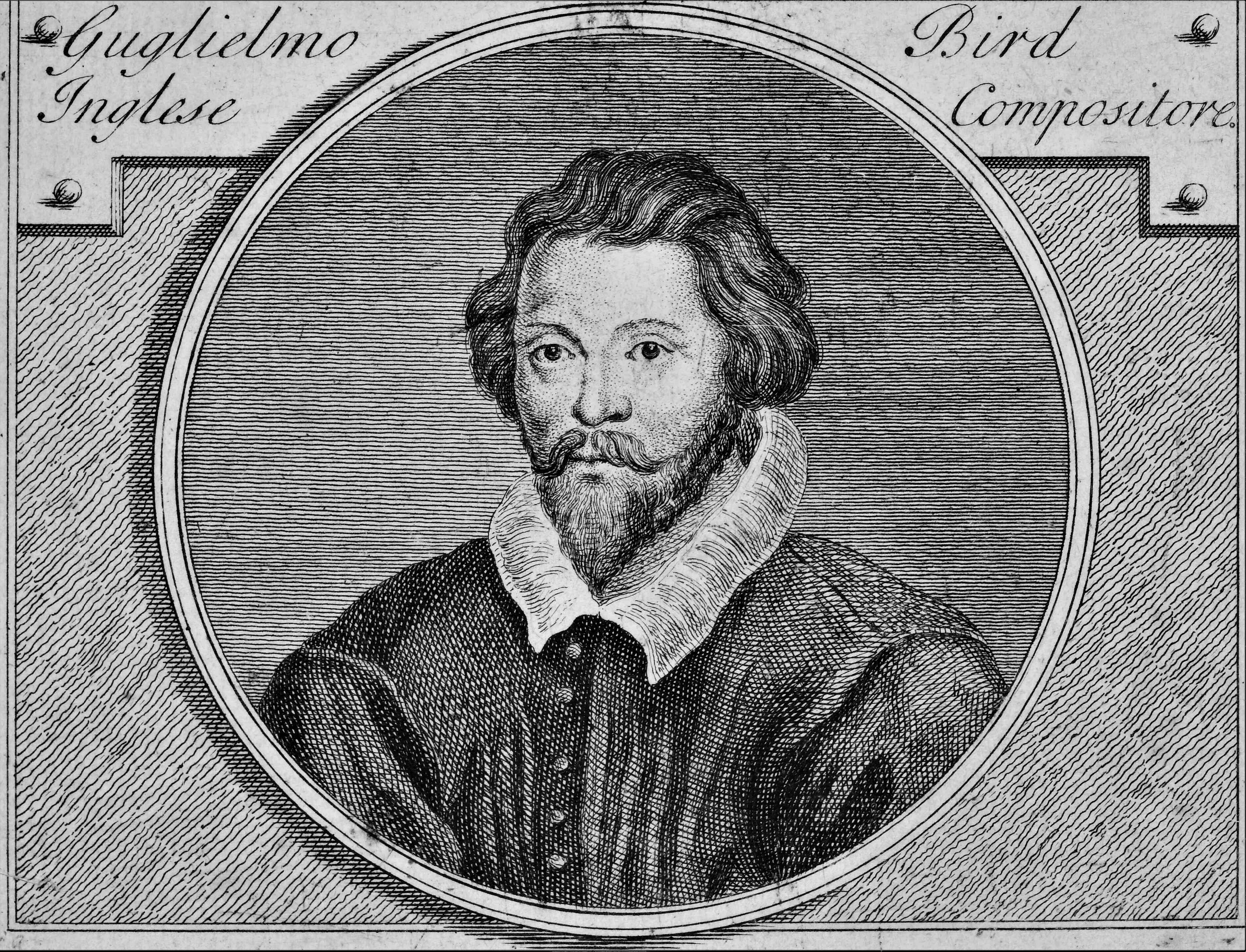
An etching of William Byrd

The so-called Great Service is a set of canticles and other items for the Matins, Communion and Evensong services of the Anglican Church, composed by William Byrd (c. 1540–1623). It is the last and most elaborate of his four services for the English liturgy. Byrd provides settings of seven items for the three principal rites of the liturgical day. The Great Service is composed using a procedure typical of the time, yet it quotes existing material by Thomas Tallis.

== Texts ==
MATINS

Venite: O come let us sing unto the Lord (Psalm 95)

Te Deum: We praise thee, O Lord (Ambrosian Hymn)

Benedictus: Blessed be the Lord God of Israel (Luke 1 68-79)

COMMUNION

Kyrie: Lord have mercy upon us (response to the Ten Commandments)

Creed: [I believe in one God] The Father almighty

EVENSONG

Magnificat: My soul doth magnify the Lord (Luke 1 46-55)

Nunc dimittis: Lord, now lettest thou thy servant depart in peace (Luke 2 29-32)

== Analysis ==
Unlike much of Byrd's sacred music, the Great Service was not printed in Byrd's lifetime, and its survival is mainly owed to incomplete sets of church choir part-books, as well as three contemporary organ parts. By collating several manuscripts, scholars have assembled a virtually complete text, though the first Contratenor Decani part from the Venite is still lacking.

The Great Service must have been composed before 1606, the last date entered in one of the earliest sources, the so-called Baldwin Commonplace Book (GB Lbl Roy. App. 24 d 2). Beldwin's copy includes some sections of the Te Deum and Benedictus from the Morning Canticles, given in score. Recent research suggests that it may have been composed somewhat earlier, for a copy in the York Minster part-books (York Minster MS 13/1-5) made by the singer John Todd about 1597-99 describes it as 'Mr Byrd's new sute of service for means'. This suggests the possibility that the Great service may have been Byrd's next major compositional project after the three Latin mass settings, which were published between 1592 and 1595.

The Great Service is scored for five-part choir, divided into Decani and Cantoris (names given to the two choir-stalls in which the two divisions of the choir sat facing each other across the aisle). Some sections are scored for groups of soloists, labelled 'verse' and contrasting with the 'full' sections. The choir was normally doubled by the organ (as the surviving organ parts make clear) and probably sometimes by loud wind instruments (cornetts and sackbuts) a practice which caused much indignation among contemporary Puritans. The five-part choir was divided into four vocal registers: means (boys' voices of restricted compass), divided contratenors, tenors (equivalent to baritones in modern terminology) and basses. The pitch standard, defined by the tuning of the organ, was about a'=475, slightly more than a semitone higher than modern concert pitch.

Byrd intended it principally for the Chapel Royal Choir, who would have sung it on major liturgical feasts and state occasions during the early Stuart period. The main performing venue at Court would have been the chapel in the old Palace of Whitehall, the principal residence of English monarchs between 1530 and 1698, when it was destroyed by fire. On major State occasions the Chapel Royal choir also sang at Westminster Abbey, or at Old St Paul's.

Most of the movements are divided into several sections, known at the time as 'verses'. A few passages(such as the Kyrie) are set in plain style with the two 'sides' of the choir in unison, but elsewhere Byrd makes full use of the possibilities for imitative writing and for various antiphonal and half-contrapuntal textures. He also combines various groupings from the Decani and Cantoris sides to make a variety of six, eight and occasionally ten-part counterpoint. Most of the movements begin with a verse section scored for four soloists, who perhaps sang 'in medio chori' (in the middle of the choir), a procedure adopted in other Elizabethan Great Service settings. Byrd thought highly enough of Tallis' Benedictus to re-use the melody for 'which hath bene since the world began' in his own Benedictus movement for the service.

The Great Service was first published in 1923 in an edition by E. H. Fellowes, who had just discovered the important Durham Cathedral part books. Fellowes did not hesitate to describe it as the finest of all settings for the Anglican rite, though his editions suffer to some extent from unwarranted changes to Byrd's scoring indications. It is now available in a scholarly edition by Craig Monson (The Byrd Edition vol.10b) which takes advantage of manuscript sources unavailable to Fellowes. It is still sung on festal occasions by English cathedral choirs.

== Bibliography ==
E. H. Fellowes, 'William Byrd' (2nd edn, London 1948)

P. G. Le Huray, Music and the Reformation in England 1549-1660 (Cambridge Studies in Music) (2009)

K. McCarthy, 'Byrd'(Master Musicians, Oxford, 2013)

C. Monson (ed.) The Great Service (The Byrd Edition vo 10b)
