= Elway Bevin =

Welsh composer and musician (c.1554–1638)

Browning à3 from the Baldwin Partbooks, Oxford. Christ Church, Ms.979-83 (ca.1570)

In Nomine à5, No.2, Oxford. Bodleian Library, Mus.Sch.d.212-16 (ca.1610)
Performed by Phillip W. Serna, Treble, Tenor & Bass Viols

Elway Bevin (c.1554-1638) was a Welsh-born organist and composer.

Briefly a vicar choral at Wells Cathedral, in 1585 he was appointed Master of the Choristers at Bristol Cathedral. He was sworn a gentleman-extraordinary of the Chapel Royal on 3 June 1605, and is said to have been a pupil of Thomas Tallis.

In 1631 Bevin published the work by which he is best known, 'A Briefe and Short Instruction of the Art of Musicke...'. His music also appears in other sources: for instance, Benjamin Cosyn's 'Virginal Book' has a service by him included amongst six entitled 'These are ye Six Services for the King's Royall Chappell,' and he has works included in several manuscript collections of vocal and consort music.
