= Corelli cadence =

A Corelli clash in a cadence on A

The Corelli cadence, or Corelli clash, named for its association with the violin music of the Corelli school, is a cadence characterized by a major and/or minor second clash between the tonic and the leading-tone or the tonic and supertonic. The cadence is found as early as 1634 in Steffano Landi's Il Sant'Alessio whereas Corelli was born in 1653. It has been described as cliché.

Corelli clash in a cadence on G

This is created by the voice leading concerns of modal music, specifically the use of anticipation during cadences. The English cadence is another "clash cadence".

== See also ==
- Harmony
