= Ye Sacred Muses =

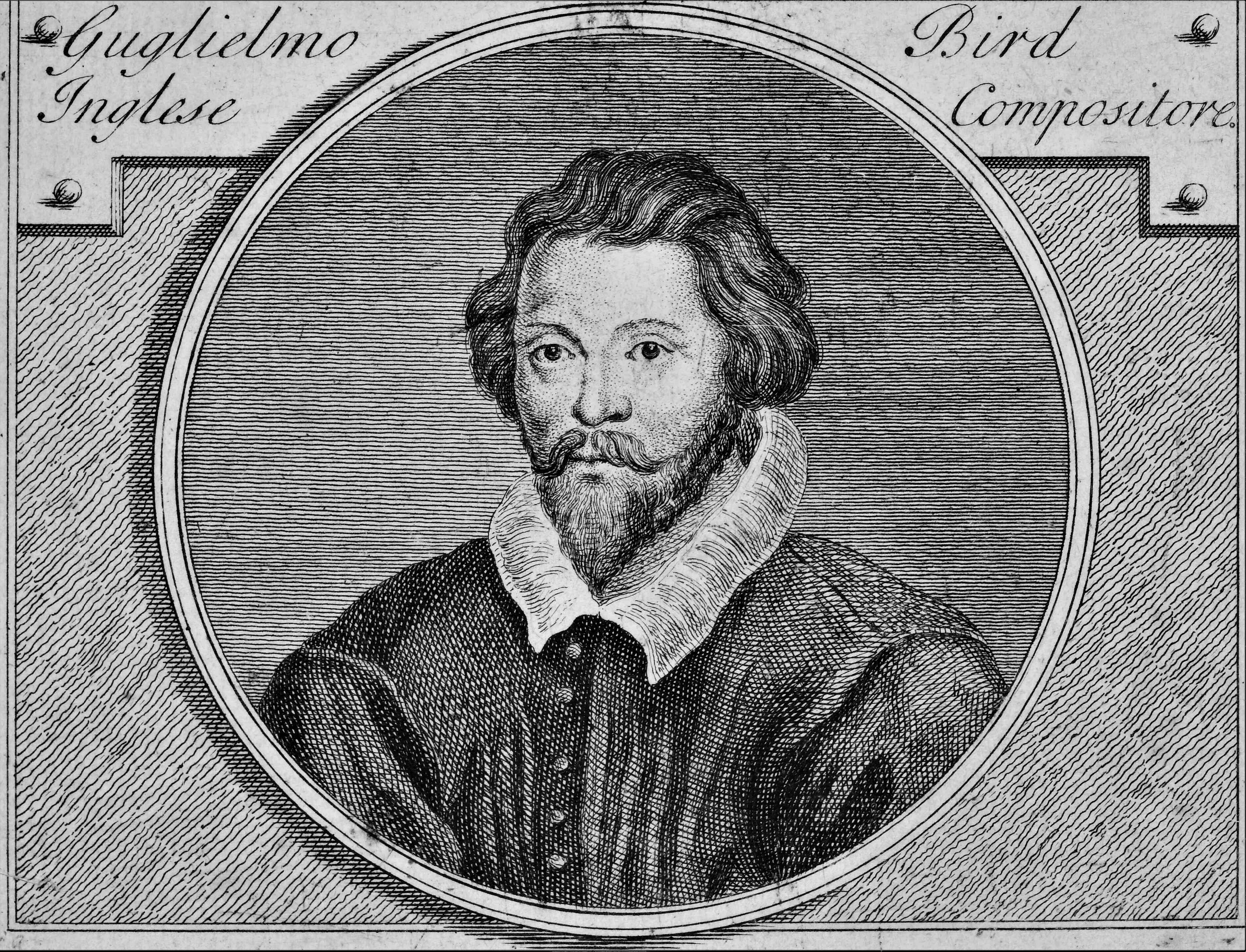
An etching of William Byrd

Ye Sacred Muses is William Byrd's Musical elegy on the death of his colleague and mentor, Thomas Tallis, in the form of a consort song or secular madrigal. It is scored for 5 parts (four viols and treble voice) or SATTB vocal ensemble.

The words are:-

Ye sacred Muses, race of Jove,
whom Music's lore delighteth,
Come down from crystal heav'ns above
to earth where sorrow dwelleth,
In mourning weeds, with tears in eyes:
Tallis is dead, and Music dies.

The concluding lines are particularly effective and are repeated. The tonality of the piece is slightly ambiguous, as despite its ending on a D major chord, it never really settles in any one key. Byrd uses the Dorian mode whilst his Renaissance contemporaries generally avoided the use of Medieval modes either by sharpening leading tones or lowering the fourth in the Lydian mode. Byrd's use of the Dorian mode can be seen in the very first phrase of the piece.
