= O nata lux =

Musical composition by Thomas Tallis

- by Thomas Tallis
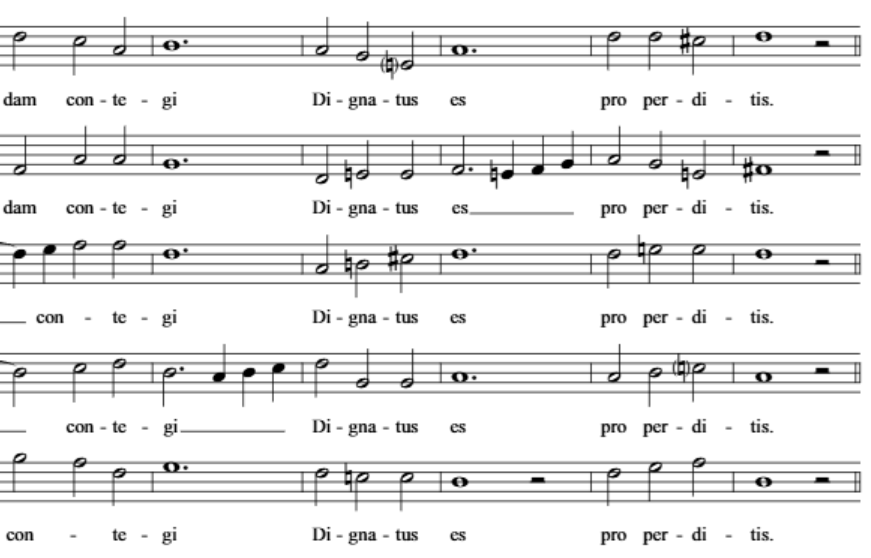
- "Qui carne quondam contegi, Dignatus es pro perditis" containing modulation and an English cadence at the end of the phrase. CCA 4.0 Complete Score by Daniel Van Gilst on IMSLP.org
- English: "O Light born of Light"
- Genre: Renaissance Choral music
- Form: Motet
- Text: Anon. Office hymn for Lauds of the Feast of the Transfiguration, 6th August
- Language: Latin
- Composed: c. 1575
- Scoring: 5 voices a cappella

O nata lux is a 5-part motet by Thomas Tallis in his 1575 Cantiones quae ab argumento sacrae vocantur. It is notable, and has been quoted by Academic commentators, for its frequent and clear use of English cadences.

== Text ==
The text is a Latin hymn for the Feast of the Transfiguration, a feast on the 6th of August for the Western church. However, by the 1570s, the motet would have served outside of its native Sarum use as a general communion anthem for Elizabeth's chapel, as part of injunctions allowing for the occasional use of sacred polyphony in Anglican churches.

=== Latin ===
O Nata Lux, de Lumine,
Jesu redemptor saeculi,
Dignare clemens supplicum
Laudes precesque summere.

Qui carne quondam contegi,
Dignatus es pro perditis,
Nos membra confer effici
Tui beati corporis.

=== English translation ===
O Light born of Light,
Jesus, redeemer of the world,
with loving-kindness deign to receive
suppliant praise and prayer.

Thou who once deigned to be clothed in flesh
for the sake of the lost,
grant us to be members
of thy blessed body.

== History ==
O nata lux was published in 1575 as part of a set of Latin-texted pieces that Tallis contributed to a joint-publication with his pupil, William Byrd. Some pieces in the 1575 Cantiones, such as Dum transisset sabbatum, are clearly older works from Tallis' early career, while O nata lux is more mature, Elizabethan in style and homophonic. Milsom has hypothesised that the motet was purposely composed in a complex technique to "show off" English polyphony and promote its reputation on the continent. Nevertheless, the Cantiones were a financial disaster, possibly due to both composers being Catholic, and Tallis, being "verie aged", was granted manors as recompense in 1577.

Unusually, unlike Tallis' other Latin motets in the 1575 Cantiones (such as O sacrum convivium and Salvator mundi), O nata lux never produced any English contrafacta for use in the Jacobean chapel. (Note: A contrafactum styled "O salutaris hostia" on CDPL is modern and was transcribed by the user, Lewis Jones.) However the motet later came to known for it English cadences described as quintessentially "English" by commentators. Today, the work is well-acclaimed and frequently used by Academics as containing an example of the English cadential method.

== Analysis ==
The mode is Phrygian when viewing the first and ending notes of the motet modally. The motet's metre is ambiguous but is generally transcribed today as 3/4, which is uncommon for Tudor choral music. The ending of the motet "Nos membra confer effici" repeating twice is, however, more stylistically typical of English composers. The cross-relations at "redemptor" (redeemer); "perditis" (lost); "corporis" ([Christ's] body) represent pain and illustrate the suffering of Christ according to redemptive theology.

False relation on beat 3 of measure 12, marked in red: simultaneous c natural and c sharp.
False relation on beat 3 of the last measure, marked in red: first, simultaneous f natural and f sharp, followed by simultaneous e flat and d natural. (E flat as per Tudor Church Music version.)
