= Tunes for Archbishop Parker's Psalter =

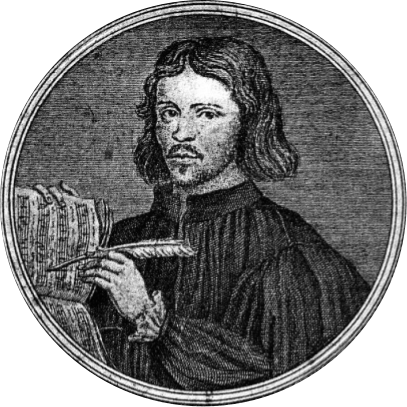
Thomas Tallis, in an engraving by Gerard Vandergucht, after Niccolò Haym

Tallis' Canon
Tallis' Canon, originally a setting for Psalm 67.

In 1567, English composer Thomas Tallis contributed nine tunes for Archbishop Parker's Psalter, a collection of vernacular psalm settings intended for publication in a metrical psalter then being compiled for the Archbishop of Canterbury, Matthew Parker. They are:

1. Man blest no doubt (Psalm 1)
2. Let God arise in majesty (Psalm 68)
3. Why fum'th in sight (Psalm 2)
4. O come in one to praise the Lord (Psalm 95)
5. E'en like the hunted hind (Psalm 42)
6. Expend, O Lord, my plaint (Psalm 5)
7. Why brag'st in malice high (Psalm 52)
8. God grant with grace (Psalm 67, tune known as Tallis' Canon)
9. Come Holy Ghost, eternal God (Veni Creator, tune known as Tallis' Ordinal)

The eight psalm tunes as printed in Parker's Psalter included symbols showing how they could be applied throughout the book. They were not separately named and appear to have become obscure for some centuries following the death of Tallis, but the set includes some of his most famous melodies: the third, "Why fum'th in sight", in the third or Phrygian mode, was used by Ralph Vaughan Williams as the basis of his Fantasia on a Theme of Thomas Tallis and became known as the "third mode melody"; the eighth is known as Tallis' Canon (or as his Evening Hymn), whose music was quoted in George Frederick Bristow's Arcadian Symphony; and the last, Tallis' Ordinal, is still included in numerous hymnals.
