= If ye love me =

Anthem by Thomas Tallis

- Anthem by Thomas Tallis
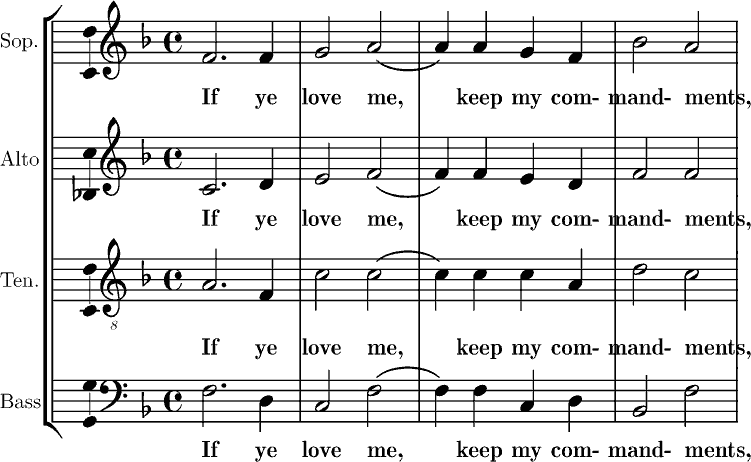
- The beginning in modern notation
- Genre: Sacred choral music
- Text: The Bible, John 14:15–17
- Language: English
- Published: 1565
- Scoring: SATB choir

"If ye love me" is a four-part anthem by the English composer Thomas Tallis, a setting of a passage from the Gospel of John. The earliest sources for the anthem date from the reign of Edward VI. It is an example of Tudor music and is part of the repertoire of Anglican church music. "If ye love me" is frequently performed today, and has been sung at special occasions including a papal visit and a royal wedding.

== Text ==
"If ye love me" by Thomas Tallis
sung by Coro Santa Pazienza

The text is not identical to that of William Tyndale's translation of the Bible, and seems to be taken from the Gospel reading for Whit Sunday in the lectionary of the 1549 Book of Common Prayer, although it is possible that Tallis's composition is earlier than that. It uses verses from the Gospel of John, words spoken by Jesus to his disciples foretelling his own death and promising that God the Father will send to them the Holy Spirit (a "Comforter"):

If ye love me keep my commandments,
and I will pray the Father,
and he shall give you another comforter,
that he may 'bide with you for ever;
even the spirit of truth.

— John 14:15–17

Another setting of the same verses by an unknown composer exists, which is thought to have been written in the reign of King Henry VIII.

== History ==
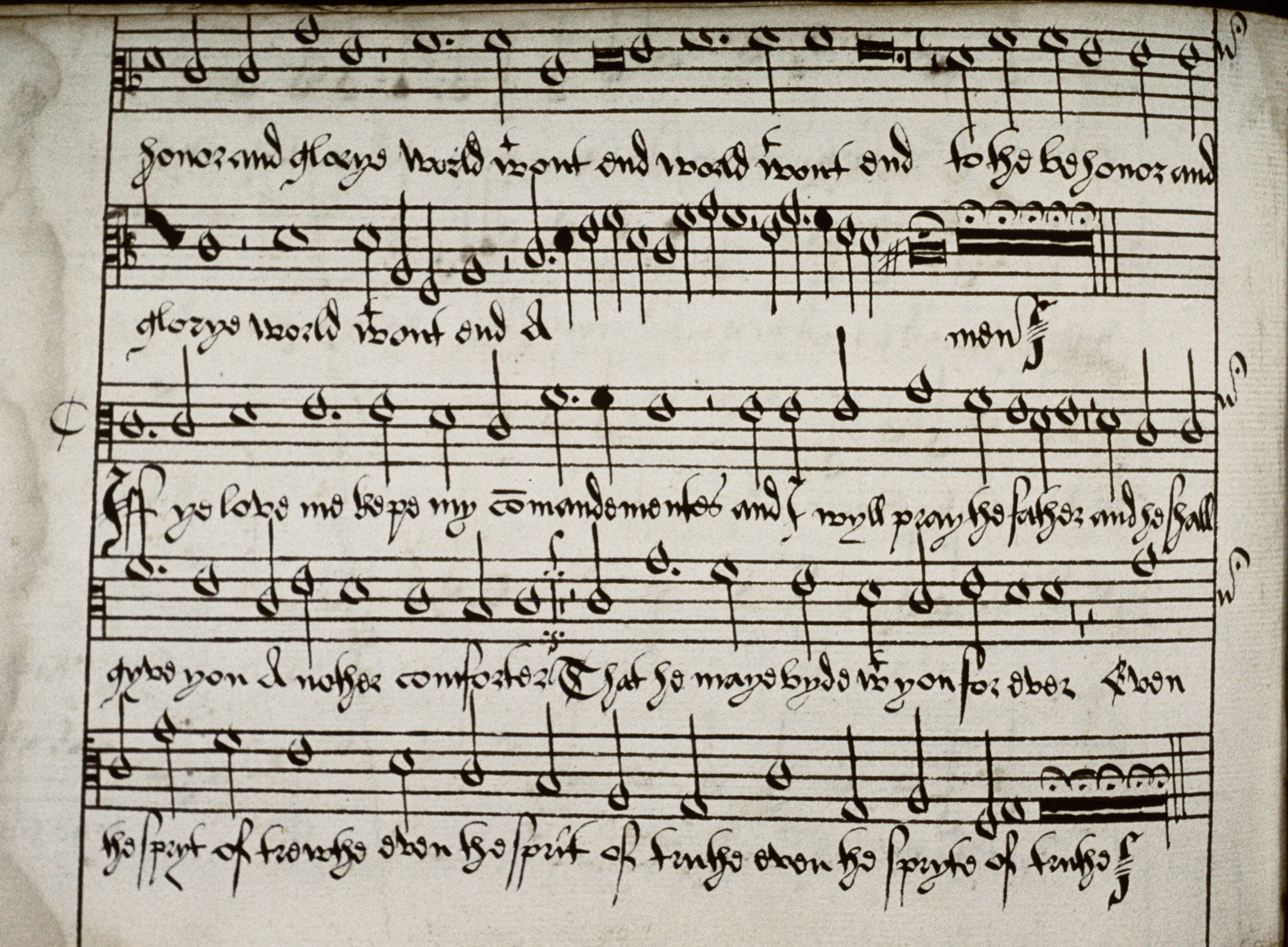
If ye love me in the Wanley Partbooks of c. 1548–1550 (staves 3–5, what is now the soprano part)

Prior to the English Reformation, English church music consisted mainly of settings of texts in Latin, such as the Latin Mass. As the Church of England broke away from the Roman Catholic Church, its Latin liturgy was replaced with scripture and prayers in English, notably with the publication of the Great Bible in English in 1539.

These changes were reflected in church music, and during the reign of King Edward VI, church composers who had previously written vocal music in Latin were required to use English texts and to write in a simple style, "to each syllable a plain and distinct note". Thomas Tallis, a prominent musician of the Chapel Royal at the time, was among the first to write sacred music in English.

"If Ye Love Me" is a setting for an a cappella choir of four voice parts, and it is a noted example of this Reformation compositional style. Typically for Anglican motets of this period, it is written in an ABB form, with the second section repeated.

The anthem is included in the Wanley Partbooks, a small set of partbooks dating from c. 1548–1550 which are a major source of Tudor church music. The partbooks were once owned by the scholar Humphrey Wanley and are now held by the Bodleian Library, Oxford. "If ye love me" was first published in 1565 by John Day in the collection Certaine notes set forthe in foure and three partes. (Note: The anthem was first published in 1565 by John Day in Certaine notes set forthe in foure and three partes (OCLC 79617658). Parts of this publication were printed earlier and bear the date 1560.) The piece was largely forgotten during the religious turmoil of the 17th century and only two examples of it are known to have been reproduced after the Restoration in 1660. However, "If ye love me" was published in 1847 by the Motett Society and it quickly became the most performed of Tallis's works. Today the anthem is a popular choice for church choirs and has been included in various modern music publications such as The Oxford Book of Tudor Anthems.

The anthem was chosen to be sung when Pope Benedict XVI attended evensong at Westminster Abbey during his 2010 visit to the United Kingdom, and also at the wedding of Prince Harry and Meghan Markle at St George's Chapel, Windsor Castle in 2018.The anthem was also performed during an ecumenical prayer service in the Sistine Chapel on 23 October 2025 by singers from the Sistine Chapel Choir and British royal chapel choirs. The service was attended by Pope Leo XIV, King Charles III and Queen Camilla.
