= Fantasia on a Theme by Thomas Tallis =

1910 work by Ralph Vaughan Williams

- Curwen edition of Tallis Fantasia orchestral score
- Genre: String orchestra
- Language: English
- Composed: 1910; 1913; 1919

Fantasia on a Theme by Thomas Tallis, also known as the Tallis Fantasia, is a one-movement work for string orchestra by Ralph Vaughan Williams. The theme is by the 16th-century English composer Thomas Tallis. The Fantasia was first performed at Gloucester Cathedral as part of the 1910 Three Choirs Festival, and has entered the orchestral repertoire, with frequent concert performances and recordings by conductors and orchestras of various countries.

== Background and first performance ==
Vaughan Williams did not achieve wide recognition early in his career as a composer, but by 1910, in his late thirties, he was gaining a reputation. In that year the Three Choirs Festival commissioned a work from him, to be premiered in Gloucester Cathedral; this represented a considerable boost to his standing. He composed what his biographer James Day calls "unquestionably the first work by Vaughan Williams that is recognizably and unmistakably his and no one else's". It is based on a tune by the 16th-century English composer Thomas Tallis, which Vaughan Williams had come across while editing the English Hymnal, published in 1906. Vaughan Williams conducted the London Symphony Orchestra in the first performance of the Fantasia, as the first part of a concert in Gloucester Cathedral on 6 September 1910, followed by Elgar's The Dream of Gerontius, conducted by its composer. (Note: Frank Howes in his book about Vaughan Williams (1954) says that the work had one prior performance, conducted by Thomas Beecham in London in 1909, but this is evidently an error. The Gloucester performance was the premiere, according to the published score, and to studies of Vaughan Williams by Ursula Vaughan Williams, Ryan Ross, Alain Frogley and Grove's Dictionary of Music and Musicians, and contemporary newspapers recorded a Queen's Hall performance in February 1913 as the work's first performance in London.)

== Music ==
=== Theme ===
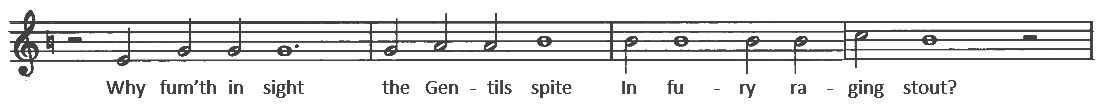
First bars of Tallis's theme

Parker's verse for which Tallis composed the tune used by Vaughan Williams

Thomas Tallis (ca.1505-1585) - Why fum'th in sight, the Third Tune from Archbishop Parker's Psalter (1567)
Inspiration for Fantasia on a Theme by Thomas Tallis by Ralph Vaughan Williams. Performed by Phillip W. Serna, Treble, Tenor & Bass Viols

Like several of Vaughan Williams's other works, the Fantasia draws on the music of the English Renaissance. Tallis's tune is in the Phrygian mode, characterised by intervals of a flat second, third, sixth and seventh; the pattern is reproduced by playing the white notes of the piano starting on E.

Tallis's theme was one of nine tunes he wrote for the Psalter of 1567 of the Archbishop of Canterbury, Matthew Parker. It was a setting of Parker's metrical version of Psalm 2, which in the King James Bible version begins, "Why do the heathen rage, and the people imagine a vain thing?", and is rendered by Parker as "Why fumeth in sight: The Gentils spite, In fury raging stout? Why taketh in hond: the people fond, Vayne things to bring about?". (Note: Musically, the same biblical passage is also familiar in Handel's Messiah: "Why do the nations so furiously rage together, And why do the people imagine a vain thing?") The tune is in Double Common Metre (D.C.M. or C.M.D.).

According to his biographer Michael Kennedy, Vaughan Williams came to associate Tallis's theme with John Bunyan's Christian allegory, The Pilgrim's Progress, a subject with which the composer had a lifelong fascination; he used the tune in 1906 in incidental music he composed for a stage version of the book. For the Hymnal, he adapted the tune as a setting of Joseph Addison's hymn "When rising from the bed of death". (Note: The Hymnal notes that Horatius Bonar's hymn "I heard the Voice of Jesus Say" and many other D.C.M. hymns may also be sung to this tune.)

=== Fantasia ===
The term "fantasia", according to Frank Howes in his study of Vaughan Williams's works, referred to the 16th-century forerunner of the fugue "in that a thread of theme was enunciated and taken up by other parts, then dropped in favour of another akin to it which was similarly treated". Vaughan Williams's fantasia draws on but does not strictly follow this precept, containing sections in which the material is interrelated, although with little wholly imitative writing, and antiphony in preference to contrapuntal echoing of themes.

Fantasia on a Theme by Thomas Tallis

The Fantasia is scored for double string orchestra with string quartet, employing antiphony between the three contributory ensembles. Orchestra I is the main body of strings; Orchestra II is smaller. The published score does not stipulate the number of players in Orchestra I; Orchestra II consists of two first violins, two seconds, two violas, two cellos and one double bass The composer's metronome marking indicates a playing time of 11½ minutes, (Note: Vaughan Williams's metronome markings for this and other works have been called into question. He did not observe them himself when conducting his works, and was present at recordings by Boyd Neel and Sir Adrian Boult where he did not object to slower tempi than marked. His musical assistant Roy Douglas has suggested that Vaughan Williams simply miscalculated because he did not possess a metronome.) but in recorded performances the duration has varied between 12m 40s (Dimitri Mitropoulos, 1958) and 18m 12s (Leonard Bernstein, 1976), with a more typical time of between 15 and 16½ minutes.

The piece is structured with an introduction, opening statement of the themes (Tallis's original hymn melody broken up into its four constituent phrases and interspersed with a "swaying chord" motif), four episodes (exploring different variations of those themes and different voicings across the three ensembles), and then a restatement of the themes and a coda.

The Introduction begins in B-flat major with all three groups playing together, ppp molto sostenuto for two bars of 4/4 time before moving to 3/4 and the low strings plucking hints of the first two phrases of the Tallis theme interspersed with the bowed sway motif. Kennedy describes the introduction as "a hauntingly poetic introduction before we hear its first full statement in Tallis's four-part harmonisation". Howes comments that "a phrase of swaying chords" after the initial statement of the theme "acts as a kind of recurrent refrain" throughout the main body of the piece.

In the Opening Statement of the full theme, beginning in the 15th bar, the two orchestras and solo quartet come together. The first two Tallis phrases and sway motif are played on all second violins, violas and celli continuing into a 6/8 section in Phrygian mode for the third and fourth phrases of Tallis's theme. The first violins join for a restatement of the fourth phrase. In the 30th bar the time signature changes back to 3/4 and the music rises to a climax. In an analysis published in 1995, Stephen Schwartz comments, "There's much octave double-stopping (each string player sounds two notes at once), a higher dynamic, and an appassionato marking after all!" The statement ends dying away in 6/8 section dying with a texture reminiscent of the opening two bars.

In the First Episode the two orchestras divide, the key switches to C major and the time signature (but not the pulse of the music) changes rapidly. The section uses the second and third Tallis phrases alternating with the sway motif. The solo viola leads off the Second Episode with a variation on the third Tallis phrase in E phrygian marked Poco più animato. The other three members of the quartet join, followed by the two orchestras, while "the string quartet continues its polyphonic meditation". The Third Episode explores the sway motif. The quartet and orchestra 1 play together, contrasting with orchestra 2, and moving poco a poco animando to a crescendo to fortissimo. The climax is in 5/8. This dies down to a pianissimo "afterglow". In the Fourth and shortest episode, marked molto adagio, the sway motif is fragmented. Schwartz describes it as the "deep heart's core of the entire piece – a miracle of the imagination". The music reverts to the original time and key for the restatement. The themes return once again, plucked on the low strings and then taken up by solo violin and viola, while the reunited orchestras provide a "featherbed of sound".

In Howes's analysis, "by way of coda the solo violin soars [and] The work ends on a chord of G major".

Kennedy observes:

The spacious and sonorous use of spread chords, the majestic cadences and extreme range of dynamics, along with the antiphony between the two string bodies (playing alternately, the one answering the other, often like an echo), the contrast with the string quartet, and the passages for solo violin and solo viola combine to create a luminous effect.

Vaughan Williams revised the work twice: first in January 1913 (for the first London performance), and then again in April 1919, making it more concise each time, taking a total of about two minutes off the original 1910 playing time.

== Reception ==
The premiere of the Fantasia received a generally warm welcome, with a few exceptions: Herbert Brewer, the Gloucester cathedral organist, described it as "a queer, mad work by an odd fellow from Chelsea". The Musical Times reviewer said, "It is a grave work, exhibiting power and much charm of the contemplative kind, but it appears over long for the subject-matter". Other reviews were more enthusiastic. The reviewer in The Daily Telegraph praised Vaughan Williams's mastery of string effect and added that although the work might not appeal to some because of its "seeming austerity", it was "extremely beautiful to such as have ears for the best music of all ages". In The Manchester Guardian, Samuel Langford wrote, "The melody is modal and antique in flavour, while the harmonies are as exotic as those of Debussy ... The work marks out the composer as one who has got quite out of the ruts of the commonplace". In The Times, J. A. Fuller Maitland also commented on ancient and Debussian echoes, and observed:

Throughout its course one is never quite sure whether one is listening to something very old or very new. … But that is just what makes this Fantasia so delightful to listen to; it cannot be assigned to a time or a school, but it is full of the visions which have haunted the seers of all times.

In 1954 Howes wrote:

The work in its definitive form has the solidity and grandeur of a cathedral, to which its strains seem to belong by a natural affinity. It has passed into the repertory of all the great orchestras of the world. Its intense Englishness has been no bar to international understanding, whatever may have been said along those lines about other of Vaughan Williams's compositions.

Listeners to the British classical music radio station Classic FM have regularly voted the piece into the top five of the station's "Hall of Fame", an annual poll of the most popular works of classical music .

== Recordings ==
Although the BBC first broadcast the Fantasia in 1926, and again over the following decade, conducted by the composer and Arturo Toscanini, it was not until 1936 that the work was recorded for the gramophone. The fledgling Decca company recorded it with Boyd Neel conducting his orchestra under the supervision of the composer in January 1936, a set described by The Gramophone as one of the outstanding records of the year. Since then there have been more than fifty recordings by orchestras and conductors from various countries.

Year	Orchestra	Conductor
1936	Boyd Neel Orchestra	Boyd Neel
1940	BBC Symphony Orchestra (BBC SO)	Sir Adrian Boult
1945	NBC Symphony Orchestra	Arturo Toscanini
1945	Minneapolis Symphony Orchestra	Dimitri Mitropoulos
1946	Hallé Orchestra	John Barbirolli
1952	Philharmonia Orchestra	Herbert von Karajan
1952	Stokowski Symphony Orchestra	Leopold Stokowski
1952	New Symphony Orchestra of London	Anthony Collins
1953	New York Philharmonic Orchestra (NYPO)	Bruno Walter
1957	Philharmonic Promenade Orchestra	Boult
1958	NYPO	Dimitri Mitropoulos
1959	Philharmonia	Sir Malcolm Sargent
1960	Symphony of the Air	Leopold Stokowski
1961	Vienna State Opera Orchestra	Boult
1962	Sinfonia of London	Barbirolli
1963	Boston Symphony Orchestra	Pierre Monteux
1963	Philadelphia Orchestra	Eugene Ormandy
1964	Morton Gould Orchestra	Morton Gould
1965	Pittsburgh Symphony Orchestra	William Steinberg
1966	London Symphony Orchestra (LSO)	Istvan Kertesz
1967	Bournemouth Symphony Orchestra	Constantin Silvestri
1968	Utah Symphony Orchestra	Maurice Abravanel
1970	London Philharmonic Orchestra (LPO)	Boult
1972	Academy of St Martin in the Fields (ASMF)	Neville Marriner
1973	LPO	Vernon Handley
1974	New Philharmonia	Stokowski
1975	LPO	Boult
1975	Royal Philharmonic Orchestra (RPO)	Stokowski
1976	NYPO	Leonard Bernstein
1977	Queensland Symphony Orchestra	Patrick Thomas
1979	LSO	André Previn
1980	City of Birmingham Symphony Orchestra	Norman Del Mar
1981	St Louis Symphony Orchestra	Leonard Slatkin
1983	ASMF	Marriner
1984	English Symphony Orchestra	William Boughton
1985	Orpheus Chamber Orchestra	—
1986	LPO	Bernard Haitink
1986	LPO	Bryden Thomson
1986	CBC Chamber Orch	Alexander Brott
1988	RPO	Previn
1989	Israel Philharmonic Orchestra	Dalia Atlas
1989	RPO	Sir Charles Groves
1989	LSO	Rafael Frühbeck de Burgos
1990	BBC SO	Sir Andrew Davis
1990	Royal Liverpool Philharmonic Orchestra (RLPO)	Handley
1991	City of London Sinfonia	Richard Hickox
1991	London Festival Orchestra	Ross Pople
1991	Philharmonia	Slatkin
1991	Consort of London	Robert Haydon Clark
1992	New Queen's Hall Orchestra	Barry Wordsworth
1997	LPO	Roger Norrington
2001	New Zealand Symphony Orchestra	James Judd
2002	RPO	Christopher Warren-Green
2004	Chamber Orchestra of Europe	Douglas Boyd
2006	Atlanta Symphony Orchestra	Robert Spano
2009	Budapest Strings	Béla Báinfalvi
2010	Duisburg Philharmonic Orchestra	Jonathan Darlington
2012	Christ Church Camerata	Geza Szilvay, David Banney
2014	Hallé	Sir Mark Elder
2016	Trondheim Soloists	–
2016	RPO	Pinchas Zukerman
2016	LSO String Ensemble	Roman Simovic
2018	Aurora Orchestra	Nigel Short
2019	RLPO	Andrew Manze
2020	London Chamber Orchestra	Warren-Green
2021	LSO	Antonio Pappano
2021	City of Birmingham Symphony Orchestra	Mirga Gražinytė-Tyla
2021	Sinfonia Varsovia	Jerzy Maksymiuk
2022	Park Avenue Chamber Symphony	David Bernard
2023	Sinfonia of London	John Wilson
2023	Philharmonia	Oliver Zeffman

== Notes, references and sources ==
=== Sources ===
==== Books ====
- Day, James (1972). Vaughan Williams. London: Dent. OCLC 462037518.
- Dearmer, Percy; Ralph Vaughan Williams (1906). "Hymn 92 – When Rising from the Bed of Death". The English Hymnal. Oxford: Oxford University Press. OCLC 10855613.
- Frogley, Alain; Aidan J. Thomson (2013). The Cambridge Companion to Vaughan Williams. Cambridge: Cambridge University Press. ISBN 978-1-139-04324-3.
- Culshaw, John (1981). Putting the Record Straight. London: Secker and Warburg. ISBN 978-0-436-11802-9.
- Douglas, Roy (1988). Working with Vaughan Williams. London: The British Library. ISBN 978-0-7123-0148-0.
- Howes, Frank (1954). The Music of Ralph Vaughan Williams. Oxford: Oxford University Press. OCLC 459433504.
- Hurd, Michael (1978). The Ordeal of Ivor Gurney. Oxford: Oxford University Press. ISBN 978-0-19-211752-6.
- Mellers, Wilfrid (1989). The Double Man: Vaughan Williams and the Vision of Albion. London: Barrie & Jenkins. ISBN 978-0-7126-2117-5.
- Ross, Ryan (2016). Ralph Vaughan Williams: A Research and Information Guide. New York and London: Routledge. ISBN 978-1-138-79271-5.
- Vaughan Williams, Ralph (1921). Fantasia on a theme by Thomas Tallis. London and New York: Boosey & Hawkes. OCLC 663881436.
- Vaughan Williams, Ursula (1964). RVW: A Biography of Ralph Vaughan Williams. Oxford: Oxford University Press. ISBN 978-0-19-315411-7.

==== Journals ====
- Atlas, Allan (2010). "On the Structure and Proportions of Vaughan Williams's Fantasia on a Theme by Thomas Tallis". Journal of the Royal Musical Association. 135 (1): 115–144. doi:10.1080/02690401003597797. JSTOR 43741608. S2CID 191641106. (subscription required)
- Atlas, Allan (Autumn 2011). "On the proportions of the passacaglia (fourth movement) of Vaughan Williams's Fifth Symphony". The Musical Times. 152 (1916): 19–32. JSTOR 23037971. (subscription required)

== See also ==
- List of variations on a theme by another composer
