= Benjamin Vandergucht =

English painter (1753–1794)

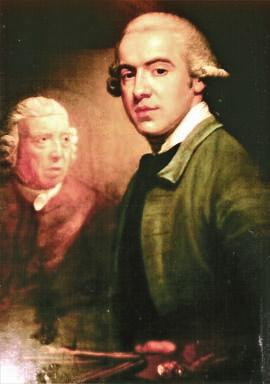
Benjamin Vandergucht's Self Portrait of the Artist Painting his Father.

Benjamin Vandergucht or Van der Gucht (1753–1794) was a picture-dealer, restorer and painter.

== Life ==
He was the thirty-second child of Gerard Vandergucht the engraver, and one of twins. He studied drawing in St Martin's Lane Academy, and on the foundation of the Royal Academy he became one of the first students in its schools.

Vandergucht became better known as a picture-restorer and picture-dealer than as an artist, and had patrons in high society. He lived for some time in Pall Mall, London, on the site later occupied by the Boydell Shakespeare Gallery. When he inherited his father's house in Upper Brook Street, he built a picture gallery onto his own house. There he stored the high-class pictures in which he dealt, charging one shilling for admission to view the collection.

On 21 September 1794, while Vandergucht was returning from a visit on business to Lord George Cavendish at Chiswick House, the boat in which he was travelling was run down off Barnes Terrace. Though Vandergucht was a swimmer, he was drowned. His collection was sold by auction at Christie's in March 1796.

== Works ==
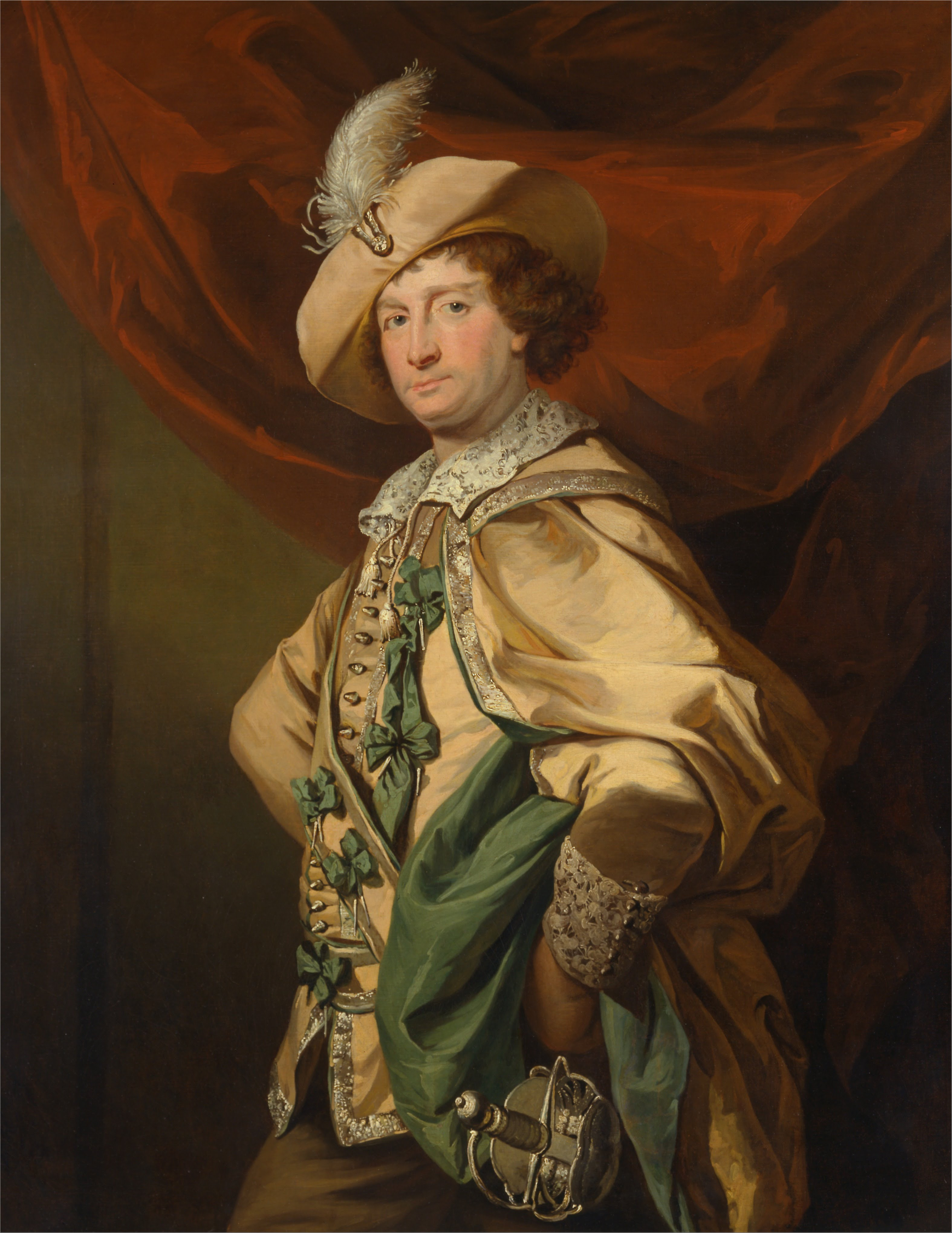
Henry Woodward in character as Petruchio in Catharine and Petruchio by Benjamin Vandergucht.

Vandergucht painted a number of portraits. Most were of actors, such as David Garrick, John Henry Johnstone, John Moody, and Henry Woodward, and some of these were engraved.

== Family ==
In 1779 he married, at Lewes, Miss Egles, niece of Mr Robert Plumer, a churchwarden at St Thomas a Becket Church, Cliffe, Lewes.
