= English cadence =

Musical pattern

Excerpt from O sacrum convivium by Thomas Tallis. The courtesy accidental on the tenor's G natural is editorial.

In classical music theory, the English cadence is a contrapuntal pattern particular to the authentic or perfect cadence. It features a flattened seventh scale degree against the dominant chord, which in the key of C would be B♭ and G–B♮–D.

Popular with English composers of the High Renaissance and Restoration periods in the sixteenth and seventeenth centuries, the English cadence is described as archaic or old-fashioned sounding. It was first given its name in the twentieth century.

The hallmark of this device is the dissonant augmented octave (compound augmented unison) produced by a false relation between the split seventh scale degree.

== Characteristics ==
In beat 3 of the example below, the tenor's B♭ sounds concurrently with the soprano's B♮. This voice leading entails the seventh degree's dual functionality, or its capacity for opposing voice-leading tendencies. That is, a lowered seventh degree resolves downward to the sixth (e.g., B♭–A), while a raised seventh (i.e., a leading tone) resolves upward to the first degree (e.g., B–C).

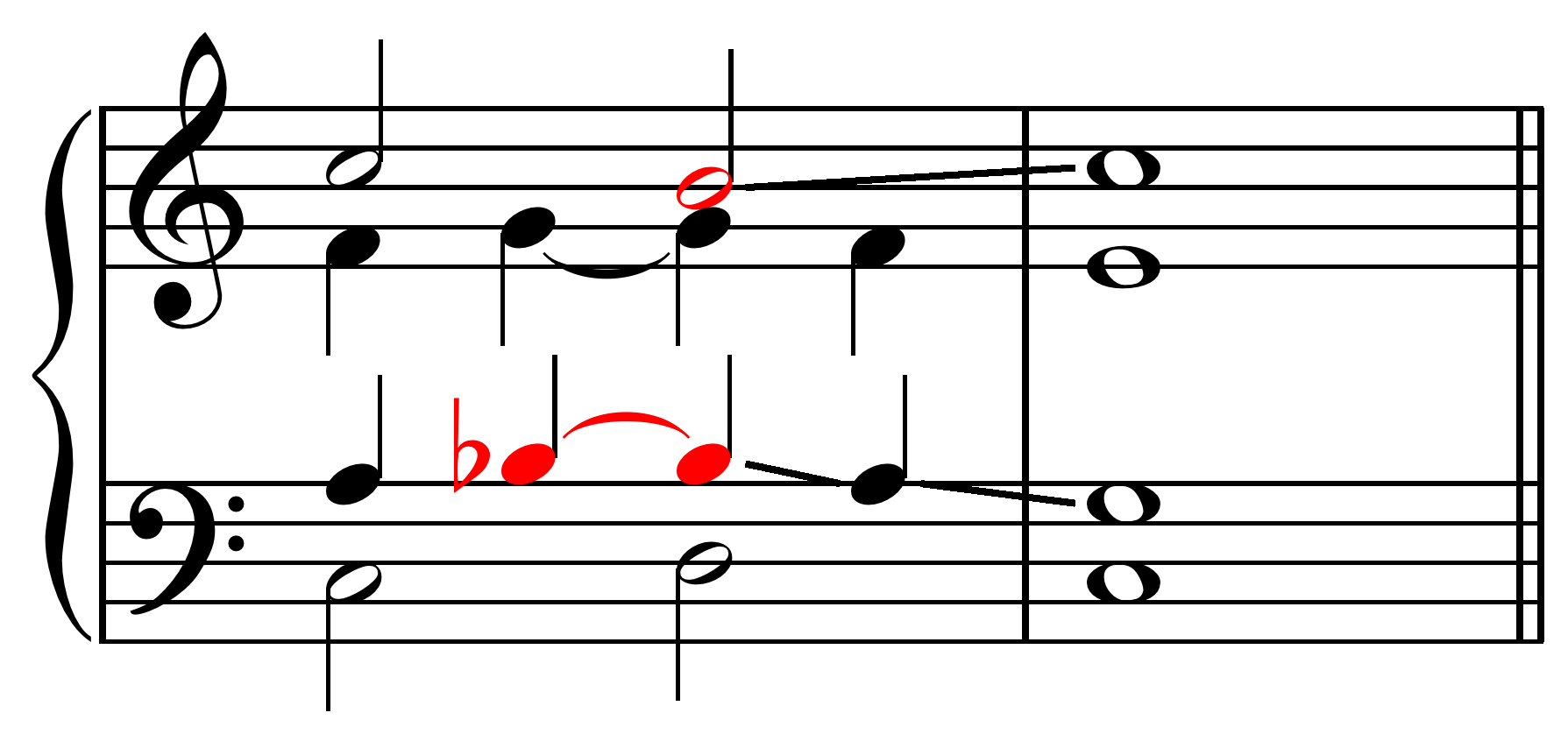
English cadence on C with the bass on the supertonic, split seventh scale degree: B♮ and B♭

In harmonic terms, the basis of the English cadence is the authentic cadence, which follows the chord progression V–I. This variant is characterized by a penultimate, dominant chord with a split third, thereby creating a false relation between the germane parts. The two notes which create this false relation need not necessarily occur simultaneously, but must both be present in the dominant chord of the cadence. Such instances may include a voice exchange whereby the flattened seventh scale degree is replaced by the raised seventh (leading tone) all within the context of the dominant chord.

The contrapuntal nature of the device dictates a minimum of three parts, though it is generally found in works with four or more parts. Where this musical device is used in music written in a minor key, it is common for it to be combined with a Picardy third, ultimately producing a major tonic.

The Corelli cadence is another "clash cadence" containing a dissonant half-step.

Also the English Cadence was a drum beating, commonly known as the Long March. The beat of the drum is in 2/4 and is common among many songs, like Hanover Hornpipe or The Girl I Left Behind.

== History and usage ==
English cadence on F, split seventh: E♮ and E♭

The English cadence was primarily used in choral music, though it is also present in contemporaneous music for consorts of viols and other instruments.

The cadence is found as early as Machaut (c. 1300–1377).

The origins of this cadential form are unclear. The end of Tallis's Spem in alium contains an example.

Described as "stale" by Morley in 1597, the device fell out of use in the early part of the seventeenth century, though we still find many examples of it in Purcell's anthems ("My heart is inditing" or "Rejoice in the Lord alway" for instance). This was due partly to a period of decline for music and composition in England, as well as to the development of generally accepted rules of harmony in which the false relation was no longer acceptable.
