= Puer natus est nobis =

Gregorian chant for Christmas Day

- Gregorian introit
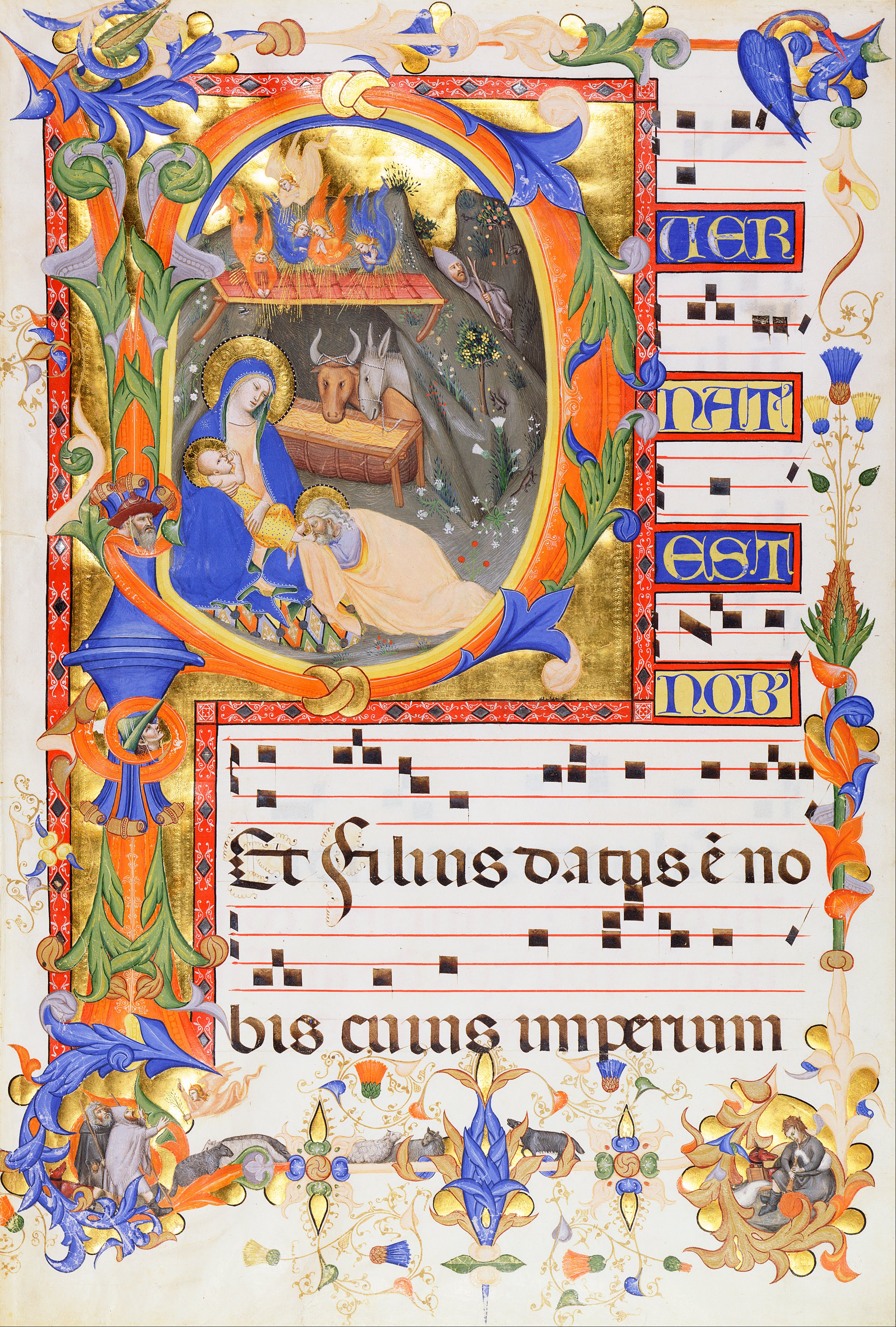
- The chant in the codex Don Silvestro dei Gherarducci
- Occasion: Christmas
- Language: Latin
- Listen

"Puer natus est nobis" (A child is born for us) is a Gregorian chant, the introit for Christmas Day. Thomas Tallis wrote a Christmas mass on the chant.

== Text ==
The text of the antiphon is taken from Isaiah 9:6, while the psalm verse is verse 1 from Psalm 98, "Sing a new song to the Lord".

Puer natus est nobis,
et filius datus est nobis :
cuius imperium super humerum eius :
et vocabitur nomen eius, magni consilii angelus.

Cantate Domino canticum novum :
quia mirabilia fecit.

A child is born to us,
and a Son is given to us:
Whose government is upon His shoulder:
and His Name shall be called, the Angel of Great Counsel.

Sing ye to the Lord a new canticle:
because He hath done wonderful things.

== Musical settings ==
The melody was used by composers as a Cantus firmus, an example being the 1554 Missa Puer natus est nobis by Thomas Tallis.
