= Hallowed Be Thy Name (disambiguation) =

"Hallowed be thy name" is a line from the Lord's Prayer in the Bible.

Hallowed Be Thy Name may also refer to:

- "Hallowed Be Thy Name" (song), a 1982 song by Iron Maiden
- "Hallowed Be Thy Name", a c. 1996 song by Indecision
