= False relation =

Type of dissonance in polyphonic music

A false relation (also known as cross-relation, non-harmonic relation) is the name of a type of dissonance that sometimes occurs in polyphonic music, most commonly in vocal music of the Renaissance and particularly in English music into the eighteenth century. The term describes a "chromatic contradiction" between two notes sounding simultaneously (or in close proximity) in two different voices or parts; or alternatively, in music written before 1600, the occurrence of a tritone between two notes of adjacent chords.

Ex. 1, from Ave Verum Corpus, by William Byrd.

In the above example, a chromatic false relation occurs in two adjacent voices sounding at the same time (shown in red). The tenor voice sings G♯ while the bass sings G♮ momentarily beneath it, producing the clash of an augmented unison.

Ex. 2, typical example of a false relation in the Late Baroque Style.

In this instance, the false relation is less pronounced: the contradicting E♭ (soprano voice) and E♮ (bass voice) (diminished octave) do not sound simultaneously. Here the false relation occurs because the top voice is descending in a minor key, and therefore takes the notes of the natural minor scale descending (the diatonic sixth degree). The bass voice ascends and therefore makes use of the ascending melodic minor scale (the raised sixth degree).

False relation is in this case desirable since this chromatic alteration follows a melodic idea, the rising 'melodic minor'. In such cases false relations must occur between different voices, as it follows that they cannot be produced by the semitones that occur diatonically in a mode or scale of any kind. This horizontal approach to polyphonic writing reflects the practices of composers in the Renaissance and Tudor periods, particularly in vocal composition, but it is also seen, for example, in the hexachord fantasies of William Byrd (for keyboard). Indeed, vocal music from this era does not often have these accidentals notated in the manuscript (see Musica ficta); experienced singers would have decided whether or not they were appropriate in a given musical context.

Many composers from the late 16th century onwards however began using the effect deliberately as an expressive device in their word setting. This practice continued well into the Romantic era, and can be heard in the music of Mozart and Chopin, for example.

== See also ==
- English cadence
- Voice leading
