= Gerard Vandergucht =

English engraver and art dealer (1696/1697–1776)

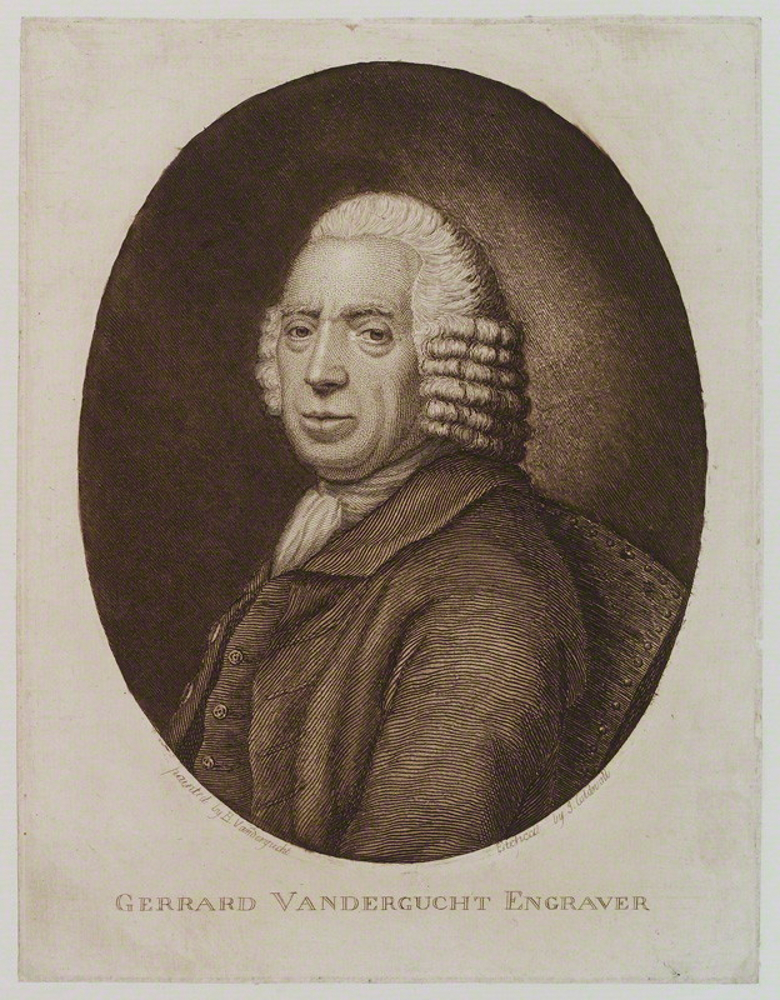
- Engraving by James Caldwall, c. 1775–1800
- Born: 1696 or 1697; London, England
- Died: 18 March 1776 (aged c. 79)
- Father: Michael Vandergucht
- Relatives: Benjamin Vandergucht (son)

Gerard Vandergucht (or van der Gucht; 1696 or 1697 – 18 March 1776) was an English engraver and art dealer.

== Biography ==
Vandergucht, was born in London, the elder son of the Flemish engraver Michael Vandergucht. He was taught engraving by his father, as was his younger brother Jan Vandergucht (or John) (c.1699-c.1730). Gerard was also taught drawing by Louis Chéron, and studied at Godfrey Kneller's Great Queen Street Academy. He surpassed the restrained style of engraving favoured by his father, and became one of the leading engravers in London by adopting the French method of combining precise engraving with etched tones.

In 1719, he was commissioned by James Thornhill to engrave four designs for the cupola of St Paul's Cathedral. He took over his father's house - the Golden Head in Queen Street, Bloomsbury - following his father's death in 1725. He married Mary Liney on 24 August 1725. They had over 30 children, including the painter and picture dealer Benjamin Vandergucht.

He became a leading publisher of engraved prints and book illustrations, and taught Robert White and Francis Patton. For example, William Cheselden commissioned Vandergucht to help work on the Osteographia or the Anatomy of Bones (1733).

In 1735, he took a leading role in the artists' demands for copyright protection which led to an extension of the provisions established by William Hogarth in the Engraving Copyright Act. The 1735 act only protected original designs. Vandergucht and his supporters successfully lobbied to extend copyright protection to cover all prints.

He concentrated on art dealing in the last 16 years of his life, selling prints, drawings, paintings and statues. He was a member of the Society for the Encouragement of Arts, Manufactures, and Commerce. He moved to Vandyke's Head, Great Brook Street, in 1758, where he died in 1776.
