= Anna Markland =

British pianist (born 1964)

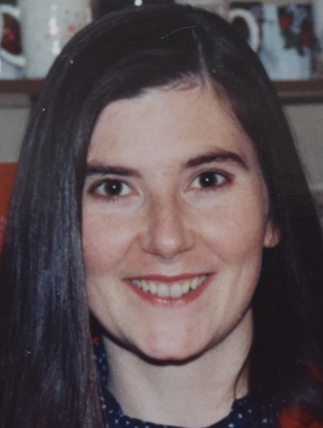

Background information
- Also known as: Anna Markland-Crookes, Anna Crookes
- Born: Anna Marie Markland; 23 May 1964 (age 61); Wallasey, Merseyside, England, UK
- Genres: Classical
- Occupations: Pianist; soprano
- Years active: 1982–present
- Labels: Decca, Signum, Naxos, Chandos

Anna Markland (born 23 May 1964) (also known as Anna Markland-Crookes and Anna Crookes)) is an English soprano and pianist who won the BBC Young Musician of the Year competition in 1982, playing Rachmaninov’s Second Piano Concerto. She has featured in a long-term study of the lives of gifted children.

== Education and early life ==
Markland grew up in a small house on a council estate in Wirral. Her grandparents on each side had immigrated from Ireland to Liverpool, her father's side being "factory hands" and on her maternal great-grandparents concert musicians. Her grandmother graduated from Trinity College Dublin with a degree in music at just 14 years old. She studied at Chetham's School of Music (1974–1983) with Heather Slade-Lipkin where she was encouraged to play the piano. She achieved an ARCM diploma at the age of 17. In 1984, she won an instrumental scholarship to Worcester College, Oxford where she studied for a BA Honours degree in Music while continuing her piano performance schedule, also singing with the choir or Worcester College and with Schola Cantorum of Oxford. This was followed by two years' postgraduate piano study with Philip Fowke and vocal study with Kenneth Bowen at the Royal Academy of Music.

== Career ==
=== Pianist ===
In 1982, Markland was the first female and pianist to win the BBC Young Musician of the Year competition. She has performed with several British orchestras including the BBC Northern Symphony Orchestra, Royal Philharmonic Orchestra, and the London Philharmonic Orchestra.

She has accompanied vocalists including Roderick Williams, James Gilchrist, Paul Agnew, Nicholas Mulroy, Matthew Brook, and Clare Wilkinson. She has also accompanied the vocal ensemble I Fagiolini.

Markland has run Masterclasses for schools, including at Monkton Combe School near Bath in 1998.

=== Soprano ===
In 1986, while studying at Oxford, Markland became a founding member of the vocal ensemble I Fagiolini. She subsequently toured and recorded extensively with the group, which specialises in Renaissance and contemporary music and has received a number of awards.

She is a founding member of Tenebrae, The Finzi Singers and the Britten Sinfonia Voices, and has performed with The Sixteen, The Monteverdi Choir, The Dunedin Consort, Trinity Baroque, Les Arts Florissants, La Grande Chapelle, The Scholars’ Baroque Ensemble, Pixels Ensemble and the BBC Singers.

== Radio and television ==
Markland appeared throughout the 1982 BBC Young Musician of the Year series and in subsequent years as an interviewed guest in 1984 and as a judge in 2010 for the keyboards category final. She was interviewed on BBC World Service's Meridian shortly after winning the competition, she was the subject of a BBC documentary feature on past competition winners in 1984, twice again in 1986, and then in 1988.

She presented a series of BBC Radio 3’s Young Artists’ Forum highlights in 1995.

On the subject of gifted children, she was interviewed on BBC Radio 4's Woman's Hour programme in September 2010 and in I was a Child Prodigy (2008).

She has performed live on BBC Radio 3's In Tune in April 2016.

== Audio recordings ==
Audio discography
Year	Title	Other artists	Role	Label
1990	The Art of Monteverdi	I Fagiolini, Robert Hollingworth	Soprano	Factory
1991	Bliss Choral Works	Finzi Singers, Paul Spicer, Roderick Williams	Soprano	Chandos
1993	Howells and Bax Choral Works	Finzi Singers, Paul Spicer	Soprano	Chandos
1993	Warlock and Moeran Choral Works	Finzi Singers, Paul Spicer	Soprano	Chandos
1994	Insalata	I Fagiolini, Robert Hollingworth	Soprano	Metronome
1994	Elgar Part-songs	Finzi Singers, Paul Spicer	Soprano	Chandos
1994	Walton Choral Works	Finzi Singers, Paul Spicer	Soprano	Chandos
1995	Tippett Choral Works	Finzi Singers, Paul Spicer	Soprano	Chandos
1995	Purcell The Indian Queen	Scholars Baroque Ensemble, David Van Asch	Soprano	Naxos
1995	Handel The Messiah Highlights	Scholars Baroque Ensemble, David Van Asch	Soprano	Naxos
1995	Bach Magnificat, Cantata ‘Ich habe genug’	Schola Cantorum / Nicholas Ward	Soprano	Naxos
1995	The Early Byrd	I Fagiolini, Robert Hollingworth	Soprano	Chandos
1996	Schütz Christmas Story	Oxford Camerata, Jeremy Summerly	Soprano	Naxos
1996	Bach Magnificat, Christmas Oratorio	Choir of New College, Oxford, Edward Higginbottom	Soprano	BBC Music
1996	Bach Motets	Scholars Baroque Ensemble, David Van Asch	Soprano	Naxos
1997	Purcell Dido and Aeneas	Scholars Baroque Ensemble, David Van Asch	Soprano	Naxos
1997	Handel Dixit Dominus, Salve Regina, Nisi Dominus	Scholars Baroque Ensemble, David Van Asch	Soprano	Naxos
1997	Kenneth Leighton Choral music	Finzi Singers, Paul Spicer	Soprano	Chandos
1997	The Caged Byrd	I Fagiolini, Robert Hollingworth	Soprano	Chandos
1997	Vivaldi Gloria, Bach Magnificat	Schola Cantorum, Nicholas Ward	Soprano	Naxos
1998	Purcell The Indian Queen	Scholars Baroque Ensemble, David Van Asch	Soprano	Naxos
2001	Croce Carnevale Veneziano	I Fagiolini, Robert Hollingworth	Soprano	Chandos
2003	Mother and Child	Tenebrae, Nigel Short	Soprano	Signum
2003	The Dream of Herod	Tenebrae, Nigel Short	Soprano	Signum
2006	Monteverdi Flaming Heart	I Fagiolini, Robert Hollingworth	Soprano	Chandos
2006	Howells Choral Works	Finzi Singers, Paul Spicer	Soprano	Chandos
2006	Handel Messiah	Dunedin Consort, John Butt	Soprano	Linn
2009	Monteverdi Sweet Torment	I Fagiolini, Robert Hollingworth	Soprano	Chandos
2010	Johann Mattheson: Christmas Oratorio; Magnificat	Kölner Akademie, Michael Alexander Willens	Soprano	CPO
2011	Magnificat: Rogier and Palestrina choral works	Philip Cave, His Majestys Sagbutts & Cornetts	Soprano	Linn
2012	Dover Beach Choral Music, songs by Stephen Wilkinson	Stephen Wilkinson, Stephen Wilkinson Choir	Soprano	Deux-Elles
2016	Amuse-Bouche	I Fagiolini, Robert Hollingworth	Piano solo and soprano	Decca
2017	The Sunlight on the Garden: The Songs of Stephen Wilkinson	Stephen Wilkinson, choir	Piano accompaniment	Signum
2019	Leonardo: Shaping the Invisible	I Fagiolini, Robert Hollingworth	Soprano	Coro
2020	Fresh Air Breathe Out	Various	Piano solo	Besant Hall

== Filmography ==
Year	Title	Other artists	Role	Label
2007	Simunye	SDASA Chorale, I Fagiolini	Soprano	Polyphonic Films
2007	The Full Monteverdi	I Fagiolini, John La Bouchardière	Soprano / actor	Polyphonic Films
2013	How Like an Angel	I Fagiolini, Circa	Soprano / actor	IAR
2016	Ode à la Gastronomie	I Fagiolini, John La Bouchardière	Actor	Polyphonic Films
2016	Amuse-Bouche	I Fagiolini	Piano / soprano	Decca
2020	The Stag Hunt	I Fagiolini, John La Bouchardière	Soprano / actor	Polyphonic Films

== Bibliography ==
Freeman, Joan (2010). Gifted lives: what happens when gifted children grow up?. London; New York: Routledge. ISBN 978-0-415-47008-7. OCLC 527702794.
