= Exmoor Singers of London Chamber Choir =

Choir based in London

The Exmoor Singers of London Chamber Choir was a choir with a strong focus on music by living composers and in particular British composers. The choir appears to have been inactive since 2017.

In 2007, the choir collaborated with rock group Bloc Party to perform at the BBC Electric Proms, which was broadcast on both BBC2 television and BBC Radio 1. The choir subsequently recorded tracks for Bloc Party album Intimacy, released in 2008. The choir also recorded with rock group Snow Patrol and feature on the album A Hundred Million Suns. Members of the choir subsequently performed with the band on BBC1 television on Later... with Jools Holland. Most recently members of the choir recorded with folk rock group Noah and the Whale.

As hosts of the London Tallis Festival, the choir was broadcast on BBC Radio 3 on 28 October 2007. The choir also appeared regularly on BBC1 television on Songs of Praise.

Exmoor Singers actively promoted music by living composers, in dedicated concerts; by more generally programming new works; and specifically in commissioning new works. For the choir's first concert dedicated entirely to living composers, on 29 May 2002, the group received a four-star review from The Times.

== New commissioned music ==
The choir commissioned eight new choral works:

- Sounds: Three Kandinsky Poems (1999) – David Sawer
- This Sceptr'd Isle (2005) – Paul Ayres
- Dreaming England (This Sceptr'd Isle) (2005) – Peter McGarr
- Tentatio (2006) – Jaakko Mäntyjärvi
- Their Lonely Betters (based on a poem by W. H. Auden) (2007) – James Lavino
- Love You Big as the Sky (a Lindisfarne Love Song) (2007) – Peter McGarr (broadcast in full on BBC Radio 3)
- Three Auden Settings (based on poems by W. H. Auden) (2008) - James Lavino
- Visitations (text adapted by James Lavino from the Book of Ezekiel) (2010) - James Lavino

The two works commissioned in 2005 entitled This Sceptr'd Isle may be the only settings for choir based on the speech in William Shakespeare's King Richard II, Act 2 scene 1.

Tentatio, Love You Big as the Sky and Visitations were commissioned for the Tallis Festival, and are 40-part unaccompanied works inspired by Thomas Tallis' Spem in alium.
