= L'Amfiparnaso =

Madrigal comedy

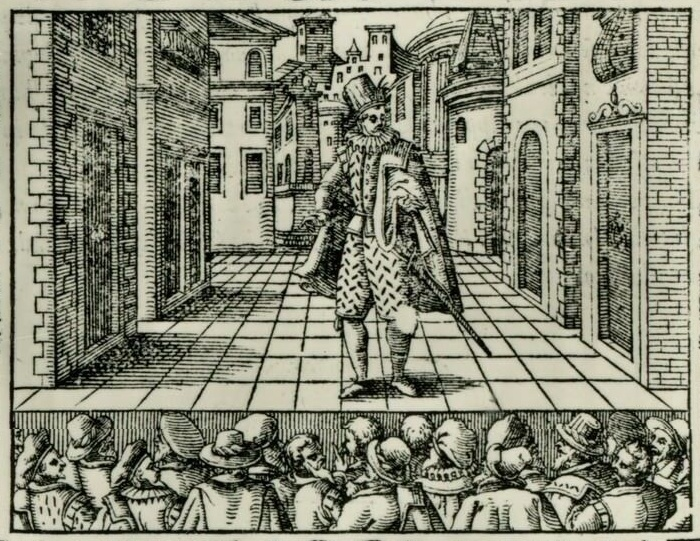
Woodcut of an actor delivering the prologue of L'Amfiparnaso, Venice 1597

L'Amfiparnaso is a madrigal comedy by composer Orazio Vecchi. It was published in Venice in 1597.

== Composition history ==
Madrigal comedy, or Commedia harmonica (as known in the 16th century Italian vernacular) was a genre that flourished briefly from 1590 for about twenty years, previous to the first operas. Some of them were collections of pieces, while others used commedia dell'arte characters and told a full story through the medium of three or five-voice ensemble. The two principal composers were Adriano Banchieri and Orazio Vecchi, both contemporaries of Claudio Monteverdi.

== Performance history ==
Although in the dedication Vecchi describes the dedicatee, Alessandro D'Este, as having heard a performance of L'Amfiparnaso, the date of the premiere is unknown. In 1844 historian François-Joseph Fétis proposed a date of 1594 for the work's premiere, but this was based on incorrect assumptions about the early history of opera and Vecchi's place in it.

== Characters ==
- Pantalone - central figure of Commedia dell'arte
- Doctor Gratiano - the old man
- Captain Cardon
- Lovers - Isabella, Lucio, Lelio, Nisa
- The Zanni - Pedrolino, Zanni, Francatrippa, Frulla

== Synopsis ==
Act 1
Scene 1. Pantalone is smitten by the charms of the courtesan Hortensia, but the ungrateful woman is not interested in the old man's affections.
Scene 2. Lelio is doubtful about the feelings of his beloved Nisa, and concludes from her present of a flower that there is little love in her for him.
Scene 3. Pantalone promises his daughter Isabella to doctor Gratiano, because he likes the clumsy fellow, who answers badly and listens even worse.
Act 2
Scene 1. Because he believes that his beloved Isabella is in love with Captain Cardone, in utter jealousy Lucio announces he will jump into the abyss.
Scene 2. Cardone quarrels with Zane, because after many hints he won't understand him, but he rather confuses him so that his answers are strange. Nevertheless, eventually he knocks on Isabella's door.
Scene 3. Isabella pretends to be in love with the Spanish Captain, so that when she dies she would more hurt his insatiable desires.
Scene 4. As soon as the Captain is gone Isabella bursts out lamenting for Lucio. She courageously draws a dagger to depart from life.
Scene 5. Frulla persuades Isabella not to thrust the dagger by telling her that her lover Lucio is still alive.
Act 3
Scene 1. As the wedding contract between Pantalone and Gratiano has been agreed upon, they joyfully start planning festivities.
Scene 2. With a melting and enamoured voice the Doctor sings a gracious madrigal under the balcony of his lovely bride.
Scene 3. Francatrippa goes to the Jews to pawn a hangmat. He knocks at the door and a noise is heard of many voices in different languages.
Scene 4. From a distance the faithful lovers meet rejoicing in their presence, pledging to be true till death.
Scene 5. Everybody is now content and happy. Isabella and Lucio are wed and a great exchange of valuable gifts is displayed.

== Recordings ==
Many recordings of L'Amfiparnaso exist with a variety of performance style choices. A 2003 DVD recording by I Fagiolini, directed by Robert Hollingworth, chooses to forgo any text or scene, but does however introduce each piece with an English introduction narrated by Simon Callow. Numerous recordings exist using multiple numbers of singers and drastically different choices of accompaniment.
