= Stefano Rossetto =

Italian composer

Stefano Rossetto (also Rossetti) (fl. 1560–1580) was an Italian composer of the late Renaissance, born in Nice, who worked mainly in Florence for the powerful Medici family, and in Munich.

== Life ==
His life has not yet been thoroughly studied. The earliest information available shows that he may have lived and worked on Chios, an island in the Aegean, in the service of the Genoese Giustiniani family; the connection can be made from the dedication to one of his 1560 books of madrigals. In 1560 he assisted at the wedding of Emmanuel Philibert of Savoy and Marguerite of Valois, which took place in Nice.

In 1566 at the latest, he went to Florence, where he served Ferdinando I de' Medici as a composer, alongside Alessandro Striggio and Francesco Corteccia, whose careers by then had begun to wane. By 1579, he was in the employ of either Albrecht V or William V (Albrecht died in 1579). The intermedio performed in Florence in 1583 alongside Fedini's play Le due Persile may have been his work. Connections between the Medici and Bavarian courts were close through the period, and composers often passed between them. Nothing certain is yet known of Rossetto's career after 1580.

== Music ==
All of his surviving music is vocal and includes madrigals and motets, some of which were probably intended for performance as intermedii, musical interludes between acts of plays.

Along with the other Medici composers, taking part in a trend of the time, he wrote gigantic polychoral compositions. One of the largest polychoral works ever composed, at least prior to modern times, was his huge 50-voice motet Consolamini popule meus. The date of the composition is unknown, but the manuscript is at the Bayerische Staatsbibliothek in Munich, suggesting he wrote it while in the service of the Bavarian court. Only a handful of larger compositions are known: Alessandro Striggio's colossal 40- and 60-voice Missa sopra Ecco sì beato giorno, and the 17th-century 53-voice Missa Salisburgensis attributed to Heinrich Ignaz Biber.

Rossetto also composed three books of madrigals, for four, five, and six voices, respectively (all published in Venice in 1560 and 1566), and an ambitious setting of the Lamento d'Olimpia, in seventeen parts, for four to ten voices, which he published in Venice in 1567. (Florence, for all its opulence, lacked publishing houses, and most of the Medici composers published their works in Venice, a city with a long publishing history.) In addition to his secular music, he published a book of motets in Nuremberg in 1573, Novae quaedam sacrae cantiones, quas vulgo motetas vocant, for five and six voices.

In his madrigals, he uses chromaticism creatively, and he liked to write both madrigals and motets in groups, as did the other Medici composers (such as Corteccia and Striggio). Much of his music is intended to be accompanied by instruments, another characteristic of Florentine polyphony of the period.

== Sources and further reading ==
- James Haar: "Stefano Rossetto", Grove Music Online, ed. L. Macy (Accessed May 14, 2007), (subscription access)
- Gustave Reese, Music in the Renaissance. New York, W.W. Norton & Co., 1954. ISBN 0-393-09530-4
- Davitt Moroney, "Alessandro Striggio's Mass in Forty and Sixty Parts". Journal of the American Musicological Society, Vol. 60 No. 1., pp. 1–69. Spring 2007. ISSN 0003-0139
- Stefano Rossetti, "Il lamento di Olimpia" and Other Madrigals from Four to Ten Voices, ed. and reconstructed by James Chater. Madison, Wisc.: A-R Publications (forthcoming)
