= Stephen Wilkinson =

British conductor and composer (1919–2021)

Stephen Wilkinson MBE
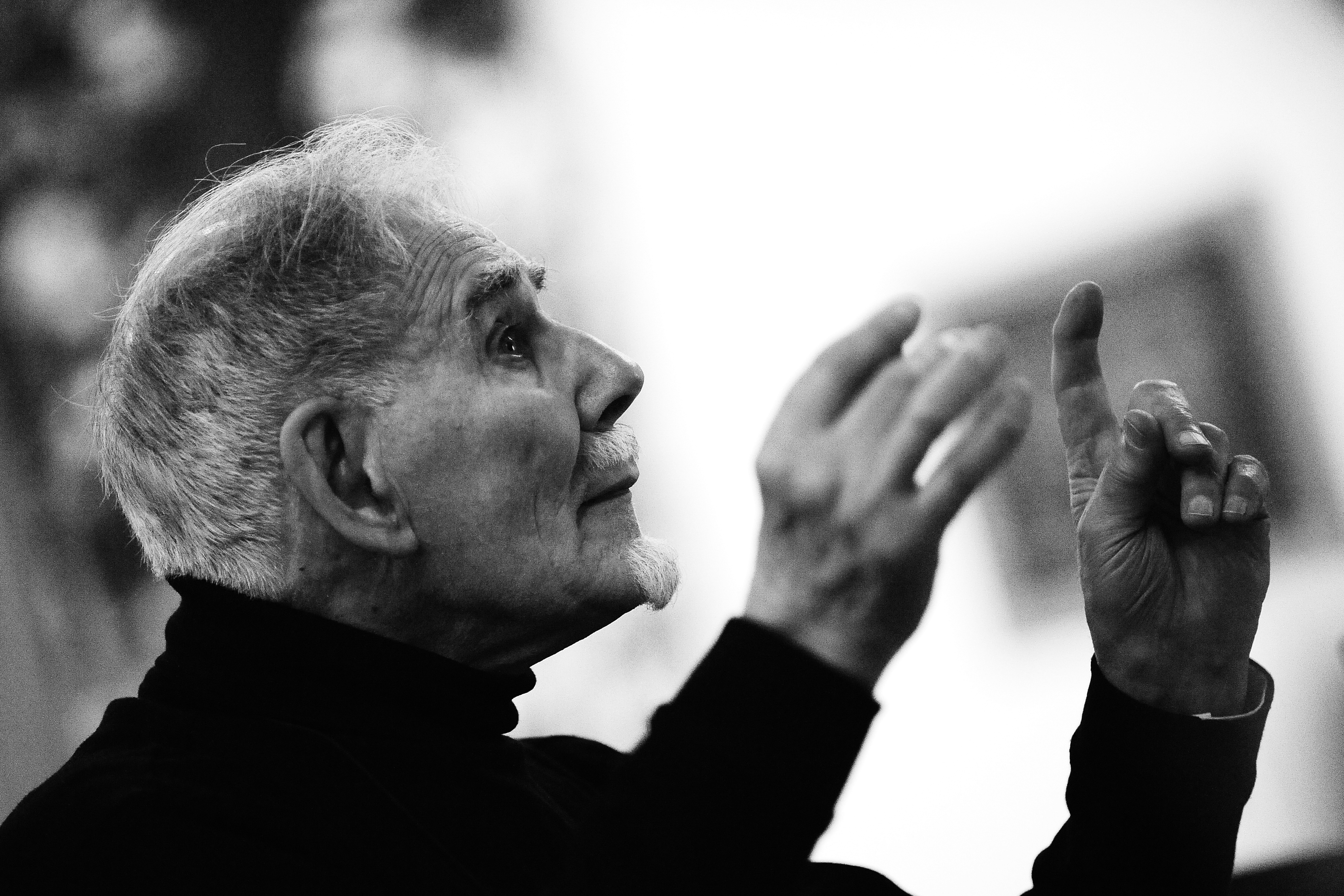
- Born: 29 April 1919; Cambridgeshire, England
- Died: 10 August 2021 (aged 102)
- Occupations: Choral conductor, composer
- Spouse: Delyth Wilkinson
- Children: 6, including Clare Wilkinson

Stephen Austin Wilkinson MBE (29 April 1919 – 10 August 2021) was a British choral conductor and composer.

== Early life ==
Born in Eversden Rectory, Cambridgeshire, on 29 April 1919, he was a chorister at Christ Church, Oxford, under Sir William Henry Harris and then went on to St. Edward's, Oxford, having whilst there a few composition lessons with Sir Thomas Armstrong. He went up to Queens' College, Cambridge as Organ Scholar in 1937 and was active as a pianist at the University Music Club, of which he was secretary in his third year. He also refounded the Echo Club for aspiring student composers. His tutors were Edward Dent, Cyril Rootham, Hubert Middleton, Henry Moule, Philip Radcliffe, Boris Ord, and Patrick Hadley.

== War service ==
He served in the Royal Navy during the Second World War, first on Atlantic convoys, then for two years as mine disposal officer in the Faroe Islands. He was then on the staff of the enemy mining section of HMS Vernon until, following an accident in 1944, he was invalided out and returned to Cambridge to complete his degree in music in 1946. He was mentioned in dispatches "for courage and undaunted devotion to duty" in August 1944.

== Career ==
From 1947 to 1953, Wilkinson was director of the Hertfordshire Rural Music School at Hitchin, conducting the Hertford Choir, who celebrated the Festival of Britain by commissioning "Cutty Sark" for voices and strings from the young Antony Hopkins. He had always retained a keen interest in working with amateurs. While in Hitchin he also studied singing with George Parker.

From 1953 to 1979, he was on the music staff of the BBC, first in Leeds, then from 1961 in Manchester. He first worked with the BBC Northern Singers in 1954 and between then and 1993, by which time they had "gone private" as the Britten Singers, he achieved a notable succès d'estime with them. They appeared at the major festivals: frequently at Aldeburgh, Bath, Cheltenham, Edinburgh and several times at The Proms, where Edward Greenfield described them as "a choir to equal, or even outshine, any in this country" (The Guardian). They also travelled widely abroad, to Ireland, Belgium, France, Poland, Spain, Turkey, Thailand, Australia and Hong Kong.

Wilkinson had always been a great champion of new music, commissioning many works and giving many "Proms Premières" and other first performances with the BBC Northern Singers. The first of these commissions was a work by Wilfrid Mellers; among his successors are Richard Rodney Bennett, Michael Ball, Judith Bingham, Stephen Dodgson, Geoffrey Burgon, Peter Dickinson, John Gardner, Kenneth Leighton, John McCabe, Elizabeth Maconchy, Nicholas Maw, Alan Bullard, Robin Orr and William Walton (Cantico del Sole). They gave the first concert performance of Gustav Holst's Nunc Dimittis, now a staple of the repertoire. They recorded widely; their disc Spring Song was listed as Critic's Choice in The Gramophone. Warm reviews followed: "In the field of choral music, Stephen Wilkinson is a genius" (The Yorkshire Post); "Simply a great choral conductor" (South China Morning Post); "No praise could overstate the merits of Stephen Wilkinson's direction" (The Guardian).

Wilkinson also performed with other professional choirs – the BBC Singers in London, the RTÉ Singers in Dublin and the Nederlands Kamerkoor. However, he remained active in amateur music as well, directing for many years the choral course of the Ernest Read Music Association, now closed down but happily taken over by Canford; also those of the Benslow Music Trust, Manchester and Bristol Universities, and 'Chorale' in Chester. For ten years he conducted yearly week-long choral courses in Italy, based around the Preggio Music Festival. He also established a series of singing days, workshops and study days in Manchester.

His principal work in this field was undoubtedly as conductor for nearly forty years of the William Byrd Singers of Manchester, becoming a much-admired figure on the Manchester music scene (described by Robert Beale of the Manchester Evening News as "one of the most extraordinary men I have ever met"). Under his direction they also gained a string of commissions, foreign tours and festival appearances to their credit. Wilkinson retired as conductor of the William Byrd Singers in May 2009 at the age of 90.

In 1991, observing that there was no training orchestra in the Manchester area, Wilkinson founded a companion young string ensemble, Capriccio, as a springboard for the National Youth Orchestra. Choir and strings recorded two CDs together. Some of the group's many alumni now leading national/international careers are: Jonathan Cohen, described as "one of Britain's finest young musicians" (Associate Conductor, Les Arts Florissants), Steven Wilkie (adjudicator, Young Musician of the Year), Clare Duckworth (RPO), Jonathan Martindale (Manchester Camerata), David Adams (leader, WNO orchestra).

Continuing his support of new music, Wilkinson ran two composers' competitions, and supported Earth, Sweet Earth by the Bristol composer Alan Charlton and Three Poems of Edith Sitwell by Graham Redwood.

== Composition ==
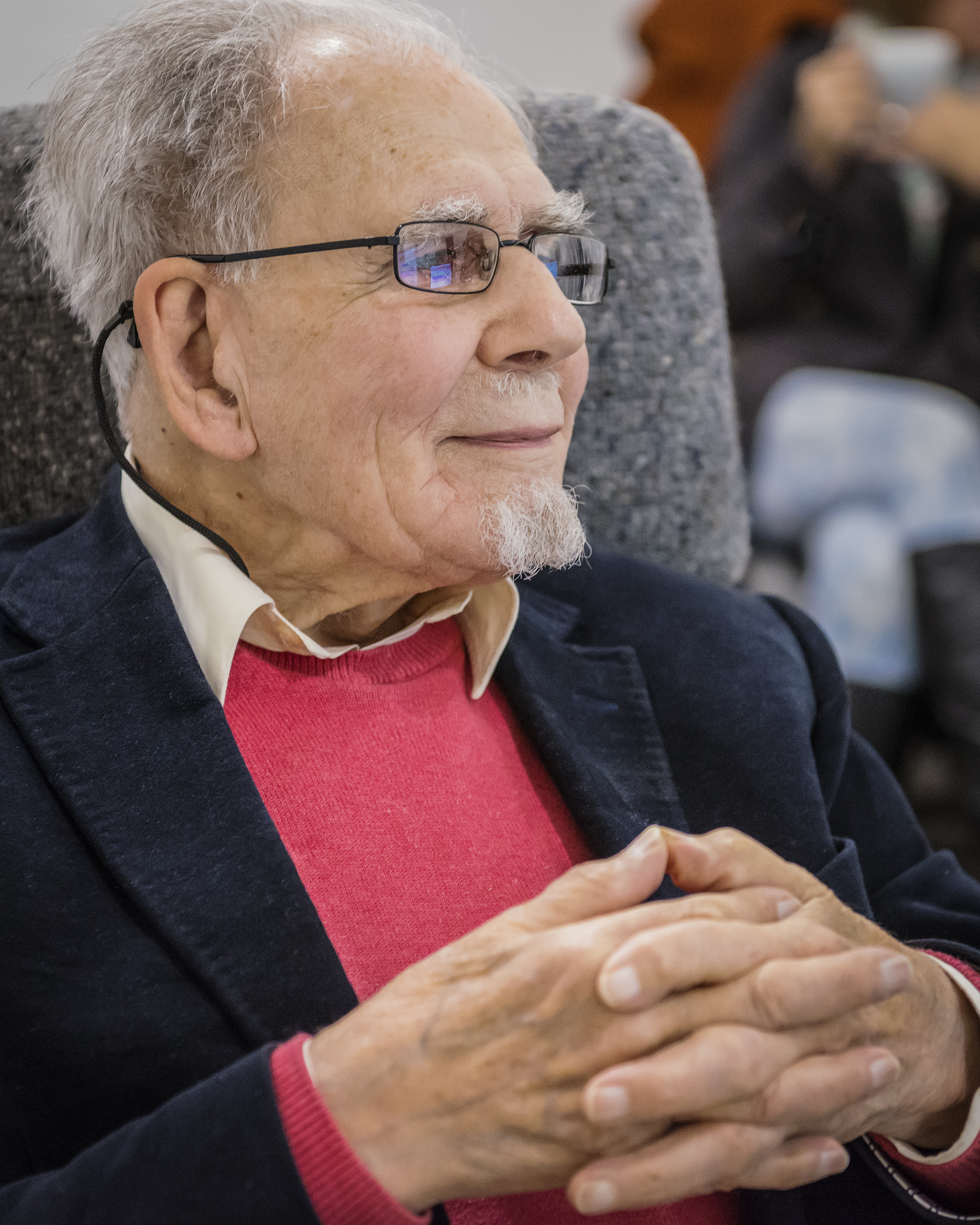
Stephen Wilkinson MBE during the recording of his English songs, at Wyastone Hall, October 2015

Following his retirement from conducting, Wilkinson was increasingly active as a composer. A CD of a selection of his choral music entitled Dover Beach was released in 2012 on the label Deux-Elles. A Phoenix Hour, settings of Irish poets, was premiered at the Aldeburgh Festival by the BBC Northern Singers. The Manchester Chamber Choir commissioned two pieces entitled Fanfare and Envoi, now augmented by a setting of Bertolt Brecht to create the tripartite set The singing will never be done; Tarira, a Faroese choir, two Tempest settings. Juno's Song and Summer Floods were written for I Fagiolini. Many solo songs of widely varying character have also appeared from the 1930s to the present day. At the Manger and The Garden, for voice and viols, were written for his daughter, mezzo-soprano Clare Wilkinson, and Fretwork, and feature on their disk The Silken Tent. Several volumes of solo songs and choral music are in print: choral collections The Other Carol Book and Grass Roots (folk song arrangements), and two solo song collections The Sunlight on the Garden and Eternal Summer are available from Forsyth of Manchester. Choral works Rorate Coeli (Eboracum Choral Series) and The Singing World, both for SATB, are published as separate scores, available from Banks of York.

== Recognition and last years ==
Manchester University gave him an honorary MA in 1982 and he was awarded an MBE for services to choral music in the 1992 New Year Honours.

Wilkinson's 70th birthday was marked by his appearance as "Artist of the Week" on BBC Radio 3; also, choral compositions were written for him in honour of the occasion by Michael Ball, Alan Bullard, Stephen Dodgson, David Gow, John Joubert, John McCabe and Elizabeth Maconchy. His 80th birthday was celebrated with a pair of concerts in Trinity College, Cambridge.

In 1945 Wilkinson married Anna Dam, whom he had met in the Faroe Islands and he learnt Faroese especially for her. They had four children, David, Christina, Bernard and Andrew. Anna died in 1975, and later that year he married Delyth Jones, a therapist and soprano, with whom he had two daughters, Clare and Stella. He lived in Sale, Cheshire for over 50 years until his death. Of his six children, four of them followed him into the music profession.

He died on 10 August 2021, aged 102.
