= Missa sopra Ecco sì beato giorno =

Mass setting, probably 1565–6, by Alessandro Striggio

The Missa sopra Ecco sì beato giorno ("Mass on 'Behold such a blessed day'") is a musical setting of the Ordinary of the Mass, for 40 and 60 voices, by Florentine Renaissance composer Alessandro Striggio. It probably dates from 1565–6, during the reign of his employer, Cosimo I de' Medici. Lost for more than 400 years, it was miscatalogued in the Bibliothèque nationale de France and rediscovered in 2005 by the musicologist Davitt Moroney.

Most of the mass is for five separate choirs of 8 voices each, with the closing Agnus Dei being for five separate choirs of 12 voices each; all of the voice parts are fully independent. With its huge polychoral forces, climaxing on sixty fully independent parts, it is the largest known polyphonic composition from the entire era.

== Background ==
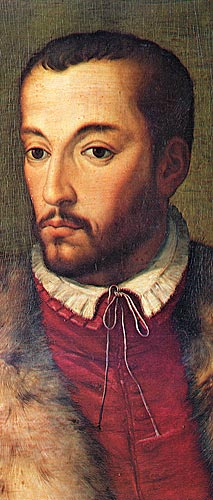
Francesco I de' Medici, Striggio's correspondent regarding his Mass setting during his diplomatic journey. Portrait by Agnolo Bronzino.

The court of the Medici was long known for its patronage of the arts, including music, and the Medici rulers, from Lorenzo the Magnificent to Cosimo I de' Medici, were particularly noted for their love of music. Keenly aware that their status depended on not only employing the most talented artists and musicians, but having them create spectacular works and having them disseminated, they encouraged composers to write music which exceeded that of their contemporaries in size and scope. During the 1530s and 1540s, Francesco Corteccia, who was the principal composer for the first part of Cosimo's reign, wrote series of elaborate intermedii—groups of madrigals designed to be performed between the acts of plays, sung by actors in costume and accompanied by instruments. This musical form was one of the predecessors of opera.

In the realm of sacred music, the desire of the Medici for opulence was no less. Instead of decorating plays with madrigals interspersed between the acts, however, the Medici's court composer – who was Striggio by the 1560s – chose to create works for larger groups of voices than had been attempted before, and to accompany these already massive vocal forces with instruments. His first attempt was apparently the Missa sopra Ecco sì beato giorno, and some time later he followed this with a 40-voice motet setting, Ecce beatam lucem, a piece which has long been known. Some other gigantic polychoral works from the same time include Thomas Tallis's famous and often-performed Spem in alium nunquam habui, for 40 voices, which may have been a response to hearing either the motet or the Mass in 1567; Stefano Rossetto's 50-voice motet Consolamini popule meus; and Cristofano Malvezzi's 30-voice intermedio for another Medici marriage, O fortunato giorno. Both Rossetto and Malvezzi were associated with the Medici court. Preceding these works was a 40-voice motet produced in Munich in 1564 by Orlande de Lassus, which has been lost.

When Striggio completed the enormous mass setting, he carried it with him during a diplomatic trip across Europe to strengthen the dynastic relation brought on by the recent marriage of Francesco de' Medici to Johanna of Austria, who was a Habsburg. His trip consisted of a series of visits to new Medici in-laws, including Maximilian II, the Holy Roman Emperor. It was necessary to give them something splendid, and this was likely a performance of the colossal 40 and 60 voice mass, along with a copy for their archives. Leaving Florence in December 1566, he visited Mantua, and then made the difficult winter trek over the Brenner Pass, visiting Vienna, Brno, Munich, and Paris. In June 1567 he made his way to London with the specific purpose of meeting "the virtuosos in the profession of music that were there" (as he wrote in a letter to Francesco I de' Medici, dated 18 May 1567). While in England, he almost certainly met Thomas Tallis, and it is now considered likely that the Missa sopra Ecco sì beato giorno was performed in a private residence – likely the London seat of the Earl of Arundel, Arundel House – in order not to offend the authorities (since performance of the Roman Catholic Mass was at that time prohibited in Protestant England).

=== Loss and recovery ===
After Striggio's exhausting 1567 European tour with his work, it disappeared for more than four centuries. While he left copies of it at several locations he visited – the court of Maximilian II, Holy Roman Emperor, the court of Albrecht V in Munich, the court of Charles IX of France – all copies had been lost. However, a copy of the mass was made in the early 17th century in France, presumably from the copy Striggio left in Paris for Charles IX. Because of several corruptions and copyist errors both on the manuscript and in the card catalogue, when the enormous document, which had been transferred to Louis XV in 1726, from the library of composer Sébastien de Brossard, and then passed to the Paris Bibliothèque nationale, the mass was attributed to an "Alessandro Strusco" and the "40 voices" had been amended to "4 voices" (presumably the copyist thought the "40" was in error, and removed the extra zero). Davitt Moroney claims that it was only in July 2005 that he recovered and identified the work. What was subsequently publicised as its first performance in modern times was on 17 July 2007 at a Proms concert in Royal Albert Hall in London, where it was sung by the BBC Singers and Tallis Scholars, with His Majestys Sagbutts & Cornetts, conducted by Moroney. However, the website of the Spanish record company Glossa states that their recording of the work uses an edition made in 1978 by French counter-tenor Dominique Visse. It is not stated there whether Visse identified the piece as being by Striggio, or whether he performed it, at that time. In 2011 what was claimed as the "World premiere recording" of the Mass had been issued by Decca; it is performed by I Fagiolini under the direction of Robert Hollingworth. A third CD recording, by Moroney himself, has not yet been issued.

== Music ==
Unlike the massive polychoral compositions of the Venetian School, in which performance groupings were positioned in lofts across from each other in a large space, the choirs in Missa sopra Ecco sì beato giorno were probably not meant to be significantly spatially separated. Although Striggio left no performance directions, the most likely arrangement was for the singers to be positioned in a large semicircle, with the instrumentalists in its center, in view of the singers. The exact instruments used, and their number, is not known, but probably varied from performance to performance. An unusual feature of the mass is the existence of two partbooks for a Bassus ad organum, a part which doubles the composite bass line of the entire composition. Presumably Striggio used this as a compositional tool, to keep track of the harmonies as he wrote forty to sixty voice parts above it; it also foreshadowed the development of the basso continuo in the 17th century.

The Missa sopra Ecco sì beato giorno is probably a parody mass, i.e. one based on a pre-existing polyphonic work, in this case named "Ecco sì beato giorno". However, no song of this name has yet been found: it may be a lost work of Striggio himself, or may even be a reference to his similarly titled 40-voice motet Ecce beatam lucem. The repetition of musical phrases at certain key points in the Mass suggests use of the parody technique, but it has also been suggested that parts of the mass are contrafacta – music originally written with different words.

Like most settings of the Ordinary of the Mass, the work is in five major divisions:

1. Kyrie
2. Gloria
3. Credo
4. Sanctus – Benedictus
5. Agnus Dei

Striggio saves the full complement of 40 and 60 voices for climactic sections. The opening "Kyrie Eleison" begins with only one choir of eight voices; the "Christe Eleison" uses two choirs, totalling 16 voices; and the return of the "Kyrie" brings in yet another choir, totalling 24. The full 40 voices sing together for the first time in the "Gloria", at the words Glorificamus te (we glorify Thee), presenting the work's first climax.

Textural contrasts abound. The "Credo", typically the longest section of any mass setting, uses 40 voices in many places, but intersperses many passages for smaller units. Sections of the mass which normally have a fuller, more exuberant musical setting, such as the "Et Resurrexit" (and He rose again) have all 40 voices, while those which more sedate or sorrowful, for example the "Crucifixus", have the smallest groupings (in this case, only eight voices of one choir sing).

The closing "Agnus Dei", with 60 voices in five groups of 12, has more independent parts than any other polyphonic composition of the Renaissance. It begins with all sixty voices entering, one after another, in imitation; once they have all entered, they all sing until the end of the piece, forming a climax to the entire work.

== Influence ==
The enormous work impressed many of its listeners, beginning in Munich, where Orlande de Lassus was in attendance; the event was similar to one a year later, described by Massimo Troiano, in which another Striggio piece for 40 voices was heard. After Munich, the piece was performed in Paris, at the house of Luigi Ludovico Gonzaga, Duke of Nevers, and then it was performed in England, where it was heard by English composer Thomas Tallis. Only Tallis, however, seems to have been inspired to match or out-do it, with his 40-voice Spem in alium. In this motet, the singers were probably arranged in a full circle around the listeners. The imitation pattern that begins Spem in alium is the same as that which begins this closing Agnus Dei in the Striggio mass, which has been seen as evidence that it was indeed this piece which Tallis heard in London in 1567.

== Recordings ==
A commercial recording featuring voices and period instruments was released by the British ensemble I Fagiolini in March 2011.

Another recording, also featuring voices and period instruments and containing additional works by Benevoli and Corteccia, was released by the French ensemble Le Concert Spirituel conducted by Hervé Niquet in 2012 on the label Glossa.

== References and further reading ==
- Moroney, Davitt (Spring 2007). "Alessandro Striggio's Mass in Forty and Sixty Parts". Journal of the American Musicological Society. 60 (1): 1–69. doi:10.1525/jams.2007.60.1.1. ISSN 0003-0139.
- Fenlon, Iain. Macy, L. (ed.). "Alessandro Striggio". Grove Music Online.
- Reese, Gustave (1954). Music in the Renaissance. New York: W.W. Norton & Co. ISBN 0-393-09530-4.
- Nutter, David. Macy, L. (ed.). "Intermedio". Grove Music Online.
- Moroney, Davitt (2007-06-18). The Pope, the Emperor and the Grand Duke" (Speech). Gresham College.
- Deutsch, Catherine (May 2017). "Lost in transcription: the 'basse continuée' of Striggio's Mass in 40 and 60 Parts as evidence for continuo practice in early 17th-century France". Early Music. 45 (2): 249–265. doi:10.1093/em/cax019.
