= Spem in alium =

Musical composition by Thomas Tallis

- by Thomas Tallis
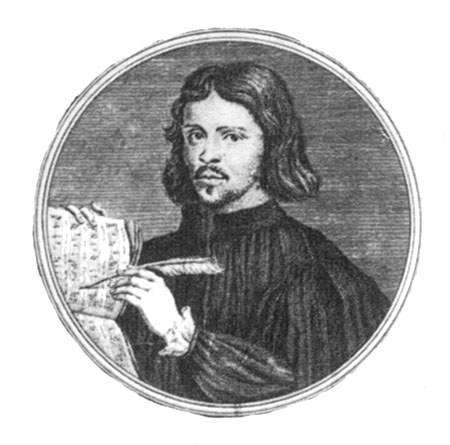
- Composer Thomas Tallis
- English: "I have never put my hope in any other but in Thee, God of Israel"
- Genre: Renaissance Choral music
- Form: Motet
- Text: Matins responsory from the Sarum Rite
- Language: Latin
- Composed: c. 1556/1570
- Scoring: 40 voices a cappella

Spem in alium (Latin for "Hope in any other") is a 40-part Renaissance motet by Thomas Tallis, composed in c. 1570 for eight choirs of five voices each. It is considered by some critics to be the greatest piece of English early music. H. B. Collins described it in 1929 as Tallis's "crowning achievement", along with his Lamentations.

== History ==
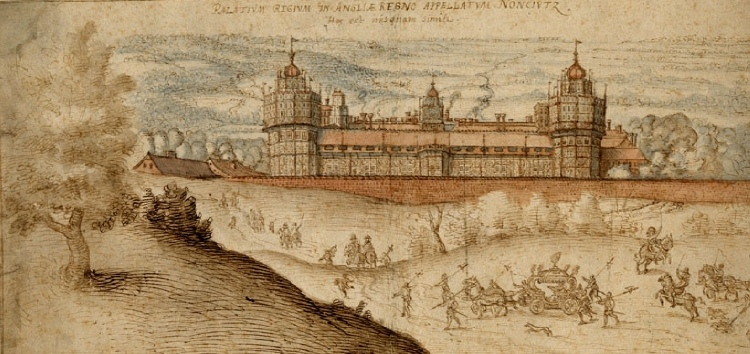
The obscure origins of "Spem in alium" are strongly linked with the former Nonsuch Palace in Surrey

The work's early history is obscure, though there are some clues as to where it may have been first performed. It is listed in a catalogue of the library at Nonsuch Palace, a royal palace sold in the 1550s to the Earl of Arundel before returning to the crown in the 1590s. The listing, from 1596, describes it as "a song of fortie partes, made by Mr. Tallys". The earliest surviving manuscripts are those prepared in 1610 for the investiture as Prince of Wales of Henry Frederick, the son of James I.

A 1611 commonplace book by the law student Thomas Wateridge contains the following anecdote:

In Queen Elizabeths time þ^{ere} was à songe sen[t] into England in 30 p[art]s (whence þ^{e} Italians obteyned þ^{e} name to be called þ^{e} Apices of þ^{e} world) w^{ch} beeinge Songe mad[e] a heavenly Harmony. The Duke of — bearinge à great love to Musicke asked whether none of our English men could sett as good à songe, and Tallice beeinge very skilfull was felt to try whether he would undertake þ^{e} matter, w^{ch} he did & made one of 40 p[ar]tes w^{ch} was songe in the longe gallery at Arundell house, w^{ch} so farre surpassed þ^{e} other that the Duke, hearinge þ^{t} songe, tooke his chayne of Gold fro[m] his necke & putt yt about Tallice his necke & gave yt him (w^{ch} songe was againe songe at þ^{e} Princes coronation).

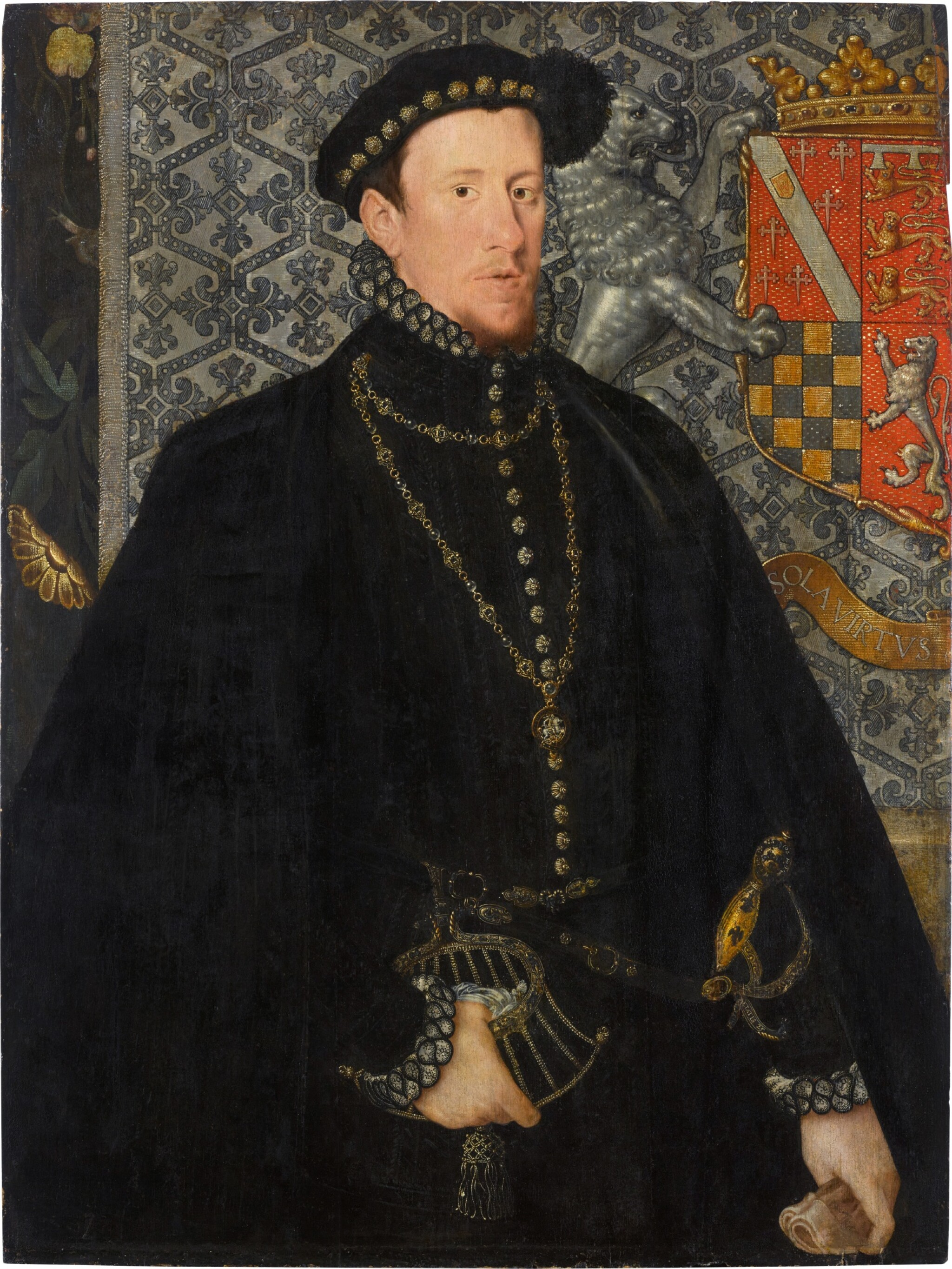
According to some accounts, Thomas Howard, 4th Duke of Norfolk commissioned the motet from Tallis.

Supposing the "30" to be a mistake, the Italian song referred to has been argued to be either the 40-part motet Ecce beatam lucem or the 40–60-voice mass Missa sopra Ecco sì beato giorno, both by Alessandro Striggio, who is known to have visited London in June 1567 after a trip through Europe during which he arranged other performances of Missa sopra Ecco sì beato giorno. This account is consistent with the catalogue entry at Nonsuch Palace: Arundel House was the London home of Henry FitzAlan, 19th Earl of Arundel; Nonsuch Palace was his country residence. Nonsuch had an octagonal banqueting hall, which in turn had four first-floor balconies above the ground floor; on this supposition it could have been the case that Tallis designed the music to be sung not only in the round, but with four of the eight five-part choirs singing from the balconies.

Likewise, the only dukedom extant during Elizabeth I's reign was that of Norfolk, so the duke in the letter can only be Thomas Howard, 4th Duke of Norfolk, and so (if the anecdote is trustworthy) his execution in 1572 gives a latest date for the work's composition. Some scholars consider that the Duke of Norfolk commissioned Tallis to write "Spem in alium" for performance at Nonsuch, and that its first performance took place there. Other historians, doubting the anecdote, suggest that the first performance was on the occasion of Elizabeth's 40th birthday in 1573.

The above are the most widely held views, but both have difficulties. The text comes from a response in the Matins order in the Sarum rite, which had been superseded by the Book of Common Prayer. Indeed, the text used for a 1610 performance of the work, while set to the music, is entirely different, suggesting that the original text was not satisfactory. Wateridge's letter is dated 40 years after the Elizabethan date and does not mention either Striggio or the duke by name. It has been suggested that if the duke in question was a duke of Norfolk this could be the third duke, who was alive during Mary I's reign. Nonsuch Palace belonged to the Norfolks in the 1550s, having been sold to them by Mary. As for the original text, its context of Judith slaying Holofernes and regaining her position fits with Mary's execution of the Duke of Northumberland, who had attempted to supplant her on the throne with Lady Jane Grey, rather than Tallis using it for Elizabeth. Alternatively, Milsom proposes the notion that the Arundel or the Duke of Norfolk, both of whom had Catholic leanings and the latter was implicated in the Ridolfi plot, might have commissioned the motet with the text for covert political meaning, as an allegory for an eventual assassination of Elizabeth. Despite the allegorical association, there is no evidence that Tallis was involved in the plot himself.

The music itself is entirely different from Striggio's setting. His work was for ten four-part choirs; Tallis's is for eight five-part choirs. The '30' in Wateridge's letter may not be a misprint or an error; the work referred to may be simply unknown. On these arguments Tallis wrote the work for Mary, Elizabeth's predecessor. The possibility has been advanced that Striggio copied Tallis, though of this there is no evidence.

An early score of the work resides at the Bodleian Library, Oxford, where it was part of an exhibition shown in 2008–09 detailing 1000 years of British choral music. Another early score of the work resides at the British Library, London in the Sir John Ritblat Treasures Gallery, where it was part of the 2014–15 exhibition "Treasures of the British Library".

== Qualities ==
Spem in alium
An excerpt of the first 2 minutes of the motet

Spem in alium has unique numerology: there are 40 voices for 40 days of Christ in the Desert, and the motet's length of 69 'longs' (138 bars) adds up to T-A-L-L-I-S in Latin letters. The motet is laid out for eight choirs of five voices (soprano, alto, tenor, baritone and bass). It is most likely that Tallis intended his singers to stand in a horseshoe shape. Beginning with a single voice from the first choir, other voices join in imitation, each in turn falling silent as the music moves around the eight choirs. At bar 40 all forty voices enter simultaneously for a few bars, and then the pattern of the opening is reversed with the music passing from choir eight to choir one. There is another brief full section, after which the choirs sing in antiphonal pairs, throwing the sound across the space between them. Finally all voices join for the culmination of the work.

Though composed in imitative style and occasionally homophonic, its individual vocal lines act quite freely within its harmonic framework, allowing for a large number of individual musical ideas to be implemented during its ten- to twelve-minute performance time. The work is a study in contrasts: the individual voices sing and are silent in turns, sometimes alone, sometimes in choirs, sometimes calling and answering, sometimes all together, so that, far from being a monotonous mass, the work is continually changing and presenting new ideas.

== Text ==
The original Latin text of the motet is from a responsory (at Matins, for the 3rd Lesson, during the V week of September), in the Sarum Rite, adapted from the Book of Judith (Judith 9).

There is no early manuscript source giving the underlay for the Latin text: the 1610 copies give the underlay for the English contrafactum, sung at the 1610 investiture of Henry Frederick, Prince of Wales, "Sing and glorify" (see below), with the Latin words given at the bottom.

=== Latin ===
Spem in alium nunquam habui
Praeter in te, Deus Israel
Qui irasceris et propitius eris
et omnia peccata hominum
in tribulatione dimittis
Domine Deus
Creator caeli et terrae
respice humilitatem nostram

=== English translation ===
I have never put my hope in any other
but in Thee, God of Israel
who canst show both wrath and graciousness,
and who absolves all the sins
of man in suffering
Lord God,
Creator of Heaven and Earth
Regard our humility

=== English contrafactum (1610) ===
Sing and glorify heaven's high Majesty,
Author of this blessed harmony;
Sound divine praises
With melodious graces;
This is the day, holy day, happy day,
For ever give it greeting, Love and joy
heart and voice meeting:
Live Henry princely and mighty,
Henry live in thy creation happy.

== Renditions ==
Recordings include those by the Clerkes of Oxenford, the Choir of Winchester Cathedral; the Tallis Scholars, The Cardinall's Musick, the National Youth Choir of Great Britain, the Oxford Camerata; the Choirs of King's and St John's Colleges, Cambridge; The Sixteen; Huelgas Ensemble; Taverner Consort and Players. The King's Singers recorded the piece in 2006 in a studio with just their six voices singing all the parts.

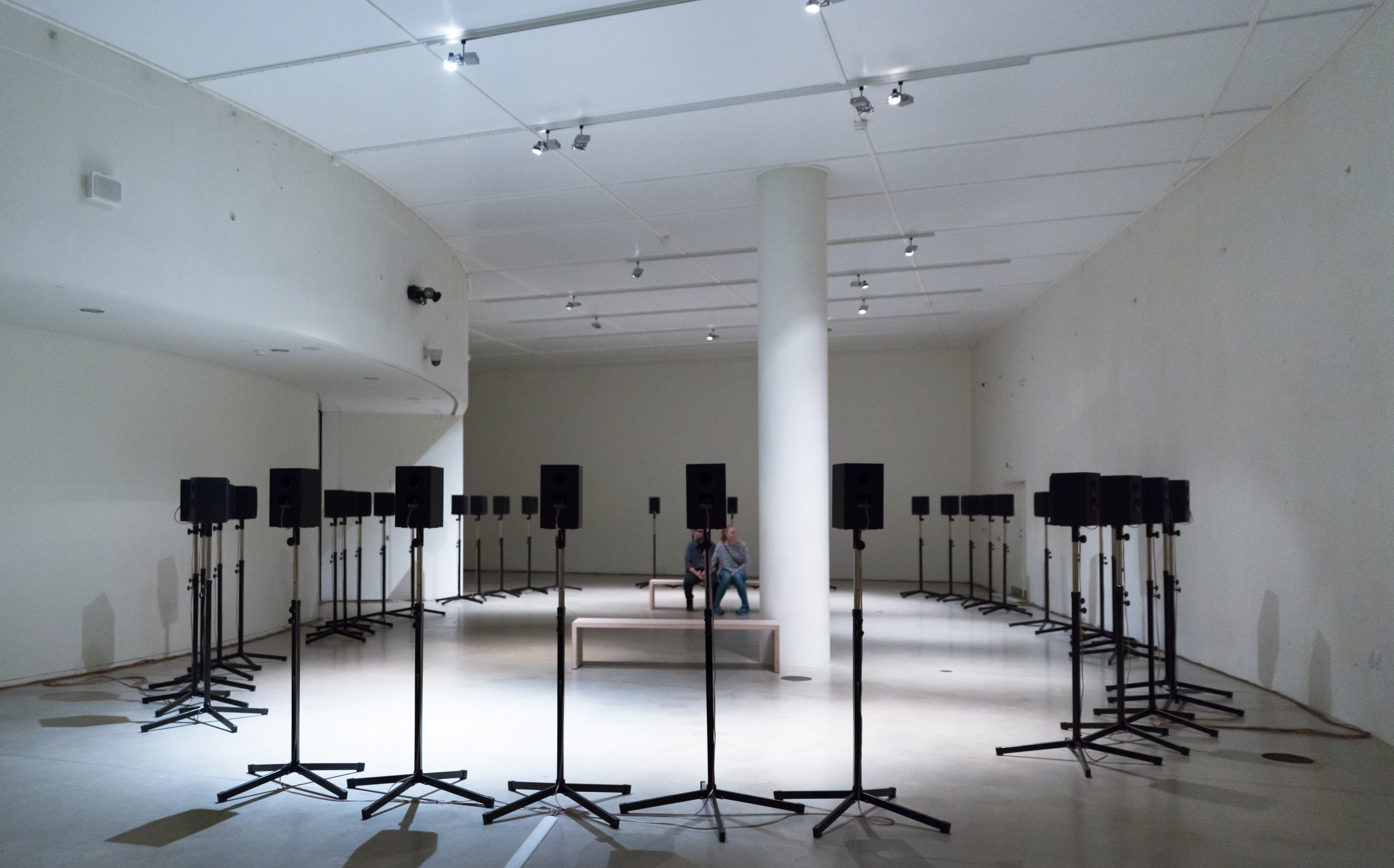
Janet Cardiff's art installation, Forty Part Motet (2001) in the ARoS Aarhus Kunstmuseum, Denmark

Another version of this motet is featured in Janet Cardiff's Forty-Part Motet (2001), a sound installation which is part of the permanent collection of the National Gallery of Canada in Ottawa, Ontario, Canada and of Inhotim in Brumadinho, Brazil. The Ottawa exhibit is set in the Rideau Street Chapel, which is the salvaged interior of a demolished convent chapel that is now in permanent display at the National Gallery. Forty speakers are set around the Chapel, each one featuring a single voice of the 40-part choir. The result is a highly enhanced polyphonic effect, as visitors may hear each individual voice through its corresponding speaker, or listen to the voices of the entire choir blending in together with varying intensities, as one moves around the Chapel.

On 10 June 2006, the BBC asked for 1,000 singers to meet, rehearse and perform the piece in the Bridgewater Hall, Manchester for what was almost certainly the largest performance of the piece in history. On that day, over 700 singers attended, most of whom had never sung the piece before. A programme following the day's events was broadcast on BBC Four on 9 December 2006.

Spem in alium features prominently in the Stephen Poliakoff TV drama Gideon's Daughter. It is also used in the film Touching the Void, reaching a climax when Yates and Simpson arrive at the summit of the mountain. It appears again in Francois Girard's Boychoir (2014), performed "in-the-round" at Stet's early-training in the fictional National Boychoir Academy.

Spem in alium has inspired modern composers to write 40-part choral works; examples include Giles Swayne's The Silent Land (1998), Robert Hanson's And There Shall Be No Night There (2002), Jaakko Mäntyjärvi's Tentatio (2006), Peter McGarr's Love You Big as the Sky (2007) and Alec Roth's Earthrise (2009), which was commissioned by the UK choir Ex Cathedra for its 40th anniversary. A London-based choral festival, the Tallis Festival, which usually included a performance of Spem in alium, commissioned both Mäntyjärvi and McGarr.

In 2021 the Self-Isolation Choir performed the work, trained and conducted by Nigel Short and led by singers from Tenebrae, with all singers recording their parts individually at home. The edition used was that prepared by Hugh Keyte in 2020 and made available by the Thomas Tallis Society along with Keyte's 70-page introduction to the edition. The Society also made available learning material whereby a singer may hear a recording of any chosen voice line, with metronome and/or organ accompaniment.

=== Recordings ===
The Hyperion recording has been described as using a "wall of sound" approach, whereas some more recent recordings aim at a surround sound effect, perhaps influenced by research into the original spacing of the performers.

The Hyperion recording has an organ accompaniment. I Fagiolini´s version (recorded alongside a 40 part motet by Alessandro Striggio) has continuo, cornetts and sackbuts.

- Thomas Tallis—Spem in alium - The Tallis Scholars (Gimell Records, 1985)
- Tallis—Latin Church Music - Taverner Consort and Players, Andrew Parrott (EMI Reflexe, 1989)
- Thomas Tallis - Winchester Cathedral Choir, (Hyperion, 1989)
- Spem in alium - The King's Singers (Signum Records SIGCD071)
- Striggio - I Fagiolini 2011
