= Music Room (TV series) =

- Genre: Music; Chat show
- Created by: John La Bouchardiere
- Presented by: Howard Goodall
- Country of origin: United Kingdom
- Original language: English
- No. of series: 1
- No. of episodes: 8

Production
- Executive producer: James Hunt
- Producer: Greg Browning
- Production locations: Elstree, England; Berlin, Germany
- Camera setup: Multiple camera
- Running time: 56 minutes
- Production company: Polyphonic Films

Original release
- Network: Sky Arts
- Release: 12 November – 31 December 2010

Music Room is an innovative British television music series that presents classical musicians and the pieces they play in a manner normally associated with popular music programming. Filmed in a bare studio with only a scaffold cube for a set, the programme strips away the glamour that often marks classical music as an elitist art form. The series has also been broadcast in Canada (on Knowledge) and across South America (on Film&Arts).

== Programme description ==
The format is a simple alternation of performance and conversation, in which soloists discuss issues and subjects arising from their selected pieces of music. There is also one item in which a particular piece is treated to basic musical analysis.

== Episodes ==
- 1. Julian Lloyd Webber (cellist) plays J.S. Bach's Adagio from Cantata no. 156 (arr. Julian Lloyd Webber), William Lloyd Webber's In the half-light, Frank Bridge's Scherzetto for cello and piano, the Scherzo pizzicato & Marcia from Benjamin Britten's Sonata for cello and piano, Gabriel Fauré's Élégie and 'In haven' from Edward Elgar's Sea Pictures (arr. Julian Lloyd Webber)
- 2. Lang Lang (pianist) plays Frédéric Chopin's - Etude (op.10 no.3), The Moon chased by the colourful clouds (arr. Wang Jian-Zhong ), 'Evocation' from Isaac Albéniz's Iberia, Precipitato from Sergei Prokofiev's Piano sonata no.7 and the Allegro assai from Ludwig van Beethoven's Piano sonata no.23: 'Appassionata'.
- 3. Nicola Benedetti, (violinist), Gabriel Fauré's Après un rêve (arr. Mischa Elman), Largo molto rubato from James MacMillan's From Ayrshire, Allegro brusco from Sergei Prokofiev's Violin sonata no.1, Blues: Moderato from Maurice Ravel's Sonata for violin and piano no.2 and the Chaconne from J. S. Bach's Partita for solo violin no.2.
- 4. Alison Balsom (trumpeter) plays Claude Debussy's Syrinx, Jean-Baptiste Arban's Variations on Bellini’s 'Norma' ('Casta diva'), Georges Enesco's Légende, Toru Takemitsu's Paths and arrangements of If I were a bell and Autumn leaves.
- 5. Leif Ove Andsnes (pianist) plays 'Norwegian' and 'Folktune' from Edvard Grieg's Lyric pieces, Andante from Leoš Janáček's In the mists, 'Promenade' and 'Gnome' from Modest Mussorgsky's Pictures at an exhibition, 'Sirens of the deluge' and 'Farewells (after Janáček)' from György Kurtág's Játékok, 'Of foreign lands and peoples', 'A curious story', 'Blind-man's bluff', 'A child falling asleep' and 'The poet speaks' from Robert Schumann's Kinderszenen and Frédéric Chopin's Ballade no.1.
- 6. Emma Johnson (clarinetist) plays Fughetta from Gerald Finzi's Five Bagatelles, Zart und mit Ausdruck from Robert Schumann's Fantasiestücke, Adagio from Wolfgang Amadeus Mozart's Clarinet concerto, her own piece, Georgie, Grazioso from Leonard Bernstein's Sonata for clarinet, John Dankworth's Picture of Jeannie and Alamiro Giampieri's Carnevale di Venezia.
- 7. Natalie Clein (cellist) plays Song of the birds (arr. Pablo Casals), Prelude and Bourée from J.S.Bach's Cello suite no.3, Ástor Piazzolla's Grand Tango, 'Jewish Song' from Ernest Bloch's From Jewish life and Zoltán Kodály Sonata for cello.
- 8. Evelyn Glennie (percussionist) plays Rich O’Meara's Restless, Steve Reich's Clapping music (arr. Evelyn Glennie), Ástor Piazzolla's Libertango, Nebojša Živkovic's Concert piece no.1, Leigh Howard Stevens's Rhythmic caprice and an improvisation of her own.
