= Massimo Troiano =

Italian composer

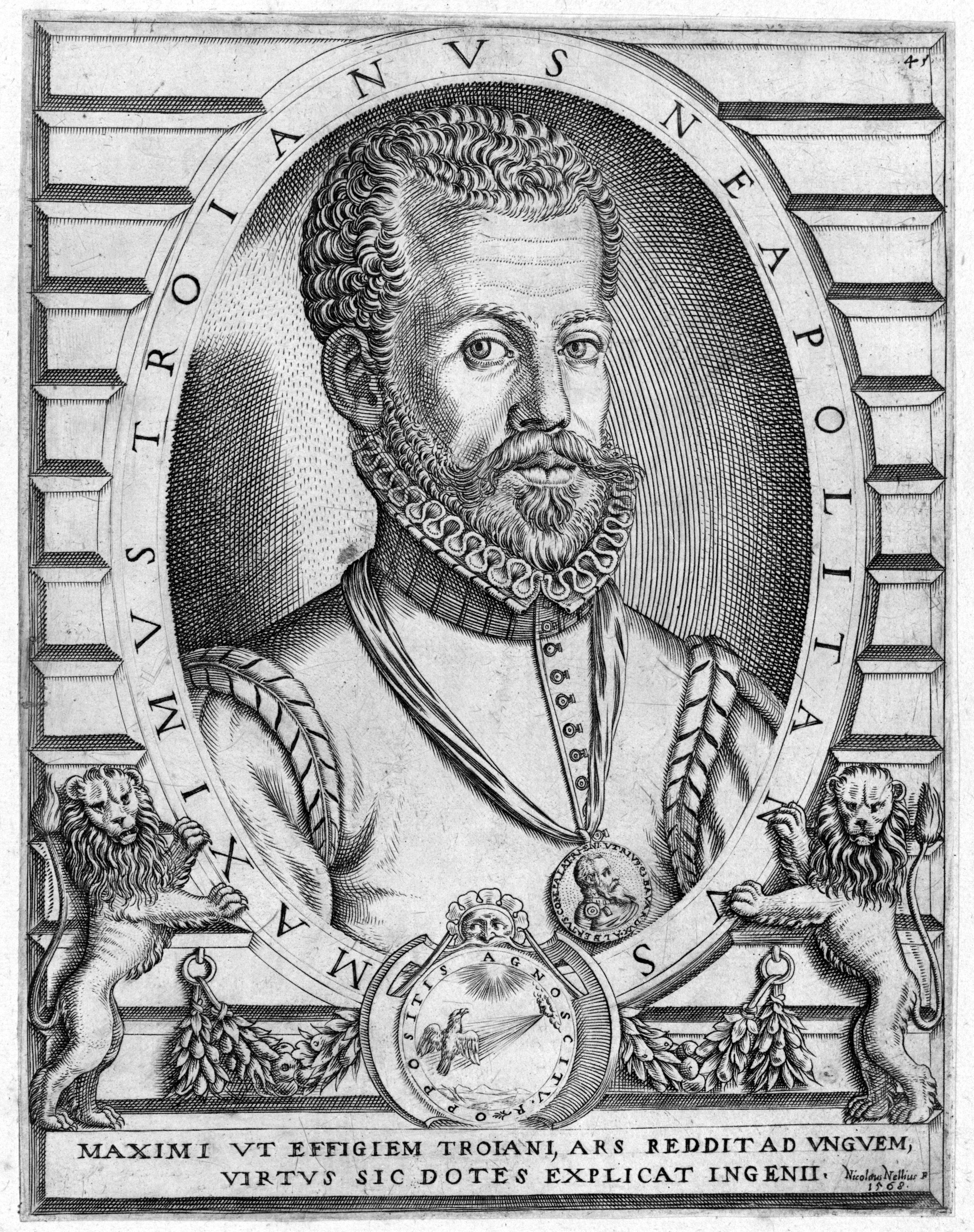
Massimo Troiano by Niccolo Nelli, 1568

Massimo Troiano (died after April 1570) was an Italian Renaissance composer, poet, and a brief, but vivid chronicler of life at the court of Bavaria's ruler, Duke Albrecht V in the late 1560s, the only period in which Troiano is known to history.

== Life ==
Nothing is known of Troiano's early life other than that he was from the vicinity of Naples, possibly from the town of Corduba, since in his first and second books of canzoni he calls himself "Massimo Troiano di Corduba da Napoli".

Only his activities during the three-year span of 1567-70 are documented, but those in some detail. In 1567 he published in Treviso a book of canzoni, secular songs on his own verse. By early 1568 he was in Munich, in the service of the House of Wittelsbach, singing in the Bavarian Hofkapelle under the direction of Orlande de Lassus. He traveled between Munich and Venice at least twice, with one extended stay in Venice in 1569, where he waited for the Duke of Bavaria to send him money and an acceptance letter for continued service. He remained in Munich until Easter 1570, when he was accused of murdering one of his musical colleagues, and fled. A warrant was issued for his arrest, but he was never found, and there is no known documentation of his activity after that time.

Another Troiano, Giovanni, appeared in Rome in 1571, a few months after Massimo's disappearance from Munich. There is no evidence to indicate whether Giovanni was related to Massimo, but they were both composers of secular vocal music. Giovanni lived for an additional half-century, until 1622.

== Work and influence ==
While Massimo Troiano published four books of secular songs (in three collections—in 1567, 1568 and 1570), he is best known for having provided in his Dialoghi a vivid and colorful description of life in the Bavarian court and especially the lavish marriage ceremony for the Munich wedding of Duke Wilhelm V and Renée of Lorraine. Modern scholars consider Troiano to be an unreliable (since he was being paid to portray the court in the most positive terms), but useful witness.

Troiano's Dialoghi was published in Munich in 1568, Venice in 1569 and appeared shortly thereafter in a Spanish translation. The book is the most complete description of how Orlande de Lassus produced and staged his musical performances, and contains accounts of both instrumental and vocal music. "The singers [serve] every morning at High Mass and at Vespers on Saturdays and the vigils of the feasts of obligation. The wind instruments are played on Sundays, and on feast days at Mass and at Vespers in company with the singers." Troiano also gives unusually detailed descriptions of how Mass was celebrated and which parts were sung polyphonically—all important information in reconstructing Renaissance performance practice. Troiano also left an account of the 1567 performance of the largest polyphonic composition of the Renaissance, the 40- and 60-voice Missa sopra Ecco sì beato giorno by Alessandro Striggio.

Troiano's music was mostly in the light Neapolitan style of the canzon villanesca alla napoletana, sometimes called simply "canzonettas", three-part vocal compositions related to madrigals but more formulaic in character, although in Troiano's hands, along with his compatriot Giovanni Leonardo Primavera, they began to approach the artistic world of the madrigal. All of his books of canzonette he published in Venice, and they show aspects both of Neapolitan and contemporary Venetian style. Most of the verse he likely wrote himself, and he sometimes writes nostalgically of his native Naples, for which he longed.

== References and further reading ==
- David Crook, Orlando di Lasso's Imitation Magnificats for Counter-Reformation Munich. Princeton, Princeton University Press. 1994. ISBN 0-691-03614-4
- Alfred Einstein, The Italian Madrigal. Three volumes. Princeton, New Jersey, Princeton University Press, 1949. ISBN 0-691-09112-9
