= Tallis Festival =

The Tallis Festival was an annual music festival based on the work of the composer Thomas Tallis. It was hosted by Exmoor Singers of London from 1990 to 2017. The festival usually included Thomas Tallis's Spem in alium for 40-part choir, but in addition commissioned new works by modern composers. In 2007 highlights from the Festival were broadcast on BBC Radio 3.

== New 40-part choral works ==
In 2006, a new 40-part work was commissioned and given its first performance: Tentatio, from Finnish composer Jaakko Mäntyjärvi. Tentatio, meaning Temptation, is based on a Latin biblical text about Christ spending 40 days in the wilderness and being tempted by the Devil. Instead of eight 5-part choirs as used by Tallis, Mäntyjärvi wrote the work for five 8-part choirs, with the fifth choir being formed entirely of basses and baritones and depicting the devil.

In 2007, another new 40-part work was commissioned: Love You Big as the Sky, from Mancunian composer Peter McGarr, subtitled "a Lindisfarne Love Song" and inspired by the island on the Northumbrian coast of England. The text is extensive and covers poems about Lindisfarne, and the detailed geography of the area, including ship wrecks and lighthouses. It is also a love song and includes text taken from a Valentine's Day card as part of its inspiration. The first performance of Love You Big as the Sky was broadcast in full on BBC Radio 3 as part of the Festival coverage.
