= Solomon's Knot (ensemble) =

Early music ensemble

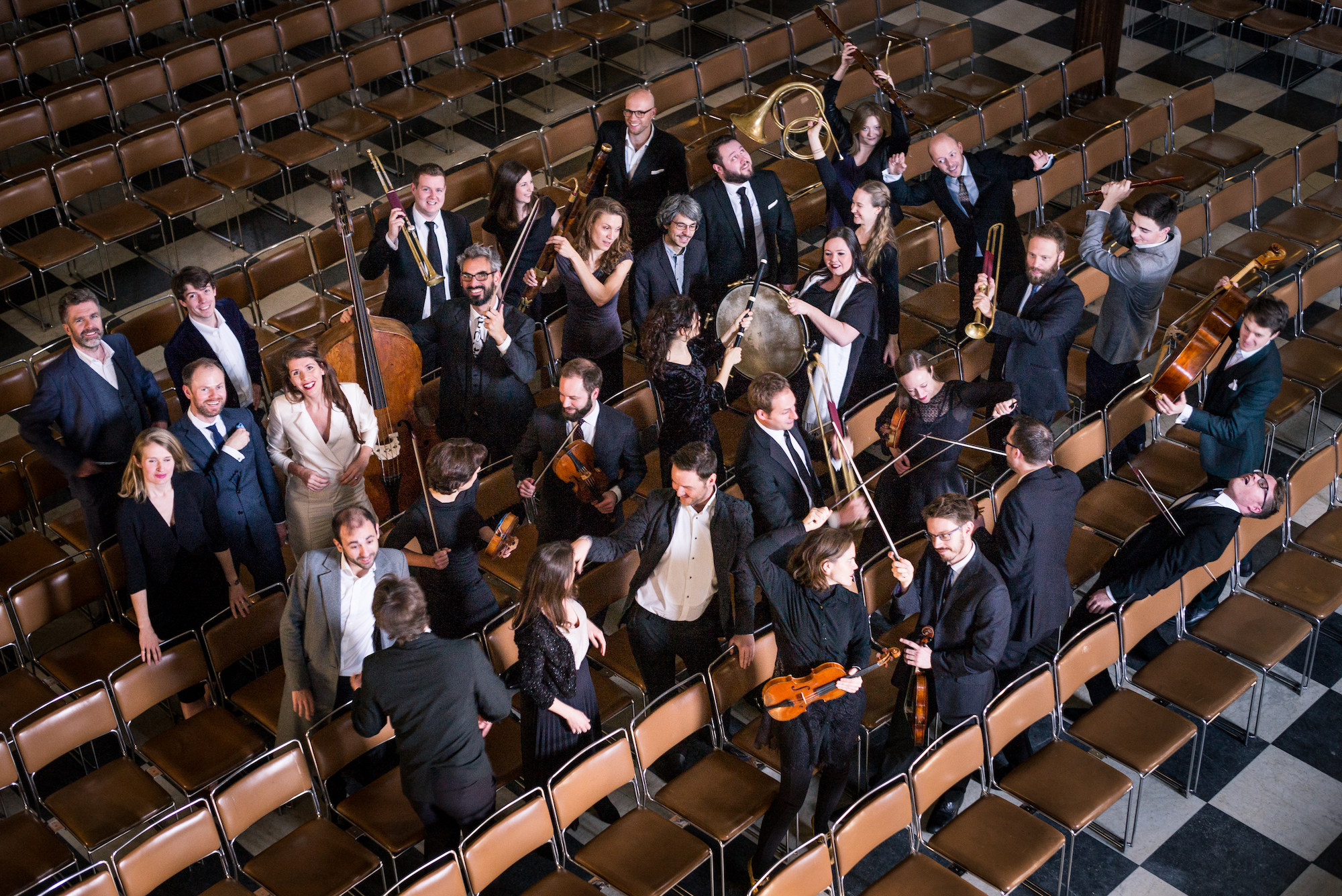

Background information
- Origin: United Kingdom
- Genres: Classical music, Early music, Baroque music
- Years active: 2008–present
- Labels: Sony Classical Records, Prospero Classical Records
- Website: solomonsknot.co.uk

Solomon's Knot is a baroque and early music vocal & instrumental ensemble, based in the United Kingdom.

== Biography ==
Described as "one of the UK's most innovative and imaginative ensembles", they work without a conductor and sing from memory.

The group works in the round, as a collective, rather than the traditional top-down structure. Inspiration for projects may come from any group member, and artistic leadership in concert isn't fixed either.

An example of the scale of projects and the impact on the audience of performing from memory was their JS Bach Mass in B Minor project, performed at Shoreditch Town Hall in 2016 and St John's, Smith Square in 2017, making the work "feel like intimate, spontaneous chamber music."

In 2023 they were appointed Baroque Ensemble in Residence at Wigmore Hall in London, which they marked by starting their Bach 300 project in December 2023, celebrating 300 years since the composition of JS Bach's most notable vocal works. The programme was live-steamed and later broadcast by BBC Radio 3.

Working with John La Bouchardiere, they also toured an acclaimed dramatisation of St Matthew Passion in notable venues across the UK and Europe, including in Leipzig, Weimar, Snape Maltings and Wigmore Hall. Approaching this work in a new way "allowed the dramatic human element to shine out, in a way that paradoxically illuminated the divine mystery at the heart."

Solomon's Knot is a registered charity under English law.

== Discography ==
In 2015, the Collective performed L'Ospedale - a Baroque opera by an anonymous composer - at Wilton's Music Hall, which was recorded for DVD. The production was acclaimed and represents the group's aim to present unknown work in new ways.

In 2019, Solomon's Knot released Magnificat: Christmas in Leipzig, their first commercial CD recording, featuring music by Johann Kuhnau, Johann Sebastian Bach & Johann Schelle on the Sony Classical label, hailed as "a joyful disc and an impressive debut."

In 2023, their Bach Motets album was released on the Prospero Classical label. Featuring the complete motets by Johann Sebastian Bach, set in the context of music which inspired him by his father's cousin, Johann Christoph Bach. The group recorded the release in the Bach Church, Arnstadt, further linking these two composers and bringing an acoustic authenticity to the performance. The double-disc album was nominated for a prestigious German Preis der deutschen Schallplattenkritik and has been hailed as a "major achievement" in international CD reviews.
