= Madrigal comedy =

Madrigal comedy is a term for a kind of entertainment music of the late 16th century in Italy, in which groups of related, generally a cappella madrigals were sung consecutively, generally telling a story, and sometimes having a loose dramatic plot. It is an important element in the origins of opera. The term is of 20th-century origin, popularised by Alfred Einstein.

The first collection of madrigals, sung as a set and telling a coherent (and highly comic) story, was Il cicalamento delle donne al bucato (the gossip of women at the laundry), by Alessandro Striggio, which was written in 1567.

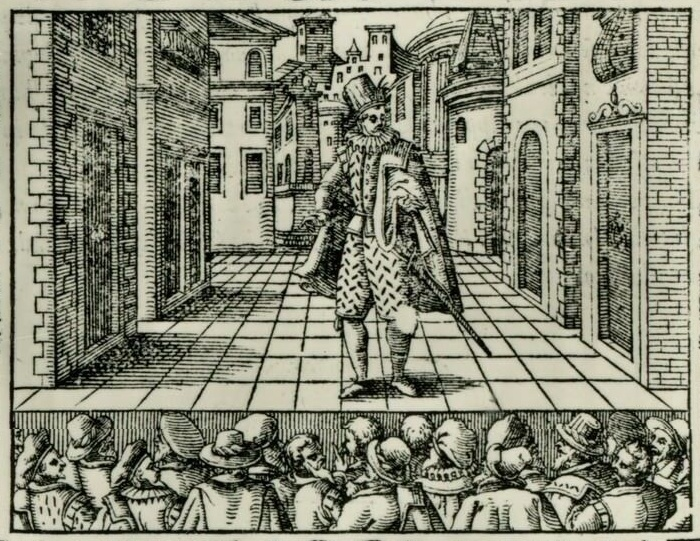
Woodcut of an actor delivering the prologue of L'Amfiparnaso, Venice 1597

Later madrigal comedies are sometimes divided into acts, including a prologue, and while not "acted" in the sense of an opera, they may have been performed on stage with elaborate painted backdrops (for example, the woodcut showing the prologue of Orazio Vecchi's L'Amfiparnaso (1597): a singer is evidently in costume in a backdrop showing a city street). Vecchi's direction in the score, however, is for the singers not to act, but for the audience to fill in the action internally, using their imagination. He speaks to the audience in the prologue to the work: "the spectacle I speak of is to be seen in your mind; it enters not through your eyes, but through your ears: instead of looking, listen, and be silent."

The form was popular especially in the 1590s and few years after 1600, only in Italy, but seems to have fallen out of favor with the advent of opera right at 1600, although a cappella madrigals were also disappearing at this time as well. The music of madrigal comedies is light, and the subject matter was invariably comic.

Principal composers of madrigal comedy included Alessandro Striggio, Adriano Banchieri, Giovanni Croce, and Orazio Vecchi.

== References and further reading ==
- Articles "Madrigal comedy", "Madrigal," "Alessandro Striggio" in The New Grove Dictionary of Music and Musicians, ed. Stanley Sadie. 20 vol. London, Macmillan Publishers Ltd., 1980. ISBN 1-56159-174-2
- Gustave Reese, Music in the Renaissance. New York, W.W. Norton & Co., 1954. ISBN 0-393-09530-4
- The New Harvard Dictionary of Music, ed. Don Randel. Cambridge, Massachusetts, Harvard University Press, 1986. ISBN 0-674-61525-5
