= Alessandro Striggio =

Italian composer (c. 1536/1537–1592)

- Born: Alessandro Striggio; 1536/1537; Mantua
- Died: February 29, 1592 (aged 55–56); Mantua
- Occupation: Composer
- Known for: Missa sopra Ecco sì beato giorno
- Style: Renaissance

Alessandro Striggio (c. 1536/1537 – 29 February 1592) was an Italian composer, instrumentalist and diplomat of the Renaissance. He composed numerous madrigals as well as dramatic music, and by combining the two, became the inventor of madrigal comedy. His compositions include the monumental Missa sopra Ecco sì beato giorno for up to 60 voices, rediscovered in 2005 after being lost for 400 years.

His son, also named Alessandro Striggio, wrote the libretto for Monteverdi's Orfeo.

== Life ==
Striggio senior was born in Mantua, evidently to an aristocratic family. Records of his early life are sparse, but he must have gone to Florence as a young man. He began working for Cosimo de' Medici on 1 March 1559 as a musician, eventually to replace Francesco Corteccia as the principal musician to the Medici court. In 1560 he visited Venice, and produced two books of madrigals in response to the musical styles he encountered there. In 1567 the Medici sent him on a diplomatic mission to England. Throughout the 1560s Striggio composed numerous intermedi for the Medici, for weddings, visits, and other state occasions. In the 1570s he continued to work for the Medici, but there is some evidence he began to travel away from Florence. He had some connection to the Bavarian court in Munich, and may have gone there on more than one occasion (possibly for the performance of his 40-voice motet Ecce beatam lucem which he wrote for a royal marriage there). He became friends with Vincenzo Galilei, the father of the astronomer, during the 1570s; whether or not he was a member of the Florentine Camerata is uncertain.

During the 1580s he began an association with the Este court in Ferrara. Ferrara was one of Italy's avant-garde centers of musical composition in the 1580s and 1590s, and Striggio composed music in the progressive madrigal style he heard there, evidently commissioned by the Medici. This music is unfortunately lost. In 1586 Striggio moved to Mantua where he remained for the rest of his life, although he retained a close association with the Medici, composing music for them at least as late as 1589.

The late madrigals are not lost. Twenty-eight madrigals from Striggio's Late Period, were transcribed from microfilm for a graduate seminar at the University of California at Berkeley (under the tutelage of Dr. Anthony Newcomb in 1974). The full notation (120 pages in score form notebooks in pencil) will be available after August 1, 2024. (Contact Music Chair, David Milnes, at 104 Morrison Hall #1200, Berkeley, CA 94720.) A typed list of first-line poetry titles will be included.

== Works ==
Striggio wrote both sacred and secular music, and all his surviving music is vocal, although sometimes with instrumental accompaniment. He published seven books of madrigals, in addition to two versions of his most famous composition, the madrigal comedy Il cicalamento delle donne al bucato et la caccia... ("The gossip of the women at the laundry").

The madrigal comedy, either invented by Striggio or made famous by him, was long considered to be a forerunner of opera, but contemporary musicological scholarship tends to see this as just one of many strands in late 16th-century Italian music which adapt prevailing musical forms to dramatic presentation. In the madrigal comedy, there is no acting: the five individual madrigals in cicalamento tell a story, but entirely in words and music. Entertainments such as the madrigal comedy were not far different from other musical forms one could see at a contemporary intermedio.

One of his most impressive works, and one of the most impressive achievements in Renaissance polyphony, is his motet Ecce beatam lucem for forty independent voices, which may have been performed in 1568 in Munich. There is some evidence that he may have had the music for either this piece or his 40/60 voice mass, Missa sopra Ecco sì beato giorno, with him on his diplomatic visit to London in 1567, since Thomas Tallis seems to have been inspired and challenged by it, and shortly afterwards wrote his own 40-voice tour-de-force Spem in alium, commissioned by Thomas Howard, 4th Duke of Norfolk. Unlike the setting by Tallis, Striggio specifically indicates for the voices to be doubled by instruments. In the Bavarian performance in 1568 of Striggio's motet the forces included eight flutes, eight violas, eight trombones, harpsichord and bass lute. The motet is a polychoral composition for four choirs, which include sixteen, ten, eight and six voices respectively, all spatially separated.

A work on a yet larger scale, and long reputed to be lost, is Striggio's mass composed in 40 parts, and which included a 60-voice setting of the final Agnus Dei. The work was recently unearthed by Berkeley musicologist Davitt Moroney and identified as a parody mass, Missa sopra Ecco sì beato giorno, and received its first modern performance at the Royal Albert Hall during the London Proms on 17 July 2007 by the BBC Singers and The Tallis Scholars conducted by Moroney. This work was most likely composed in 1565/6, and carried by Striggio on a journey across Europe in late winter and spring 1567, for performances at Mantua, Munich and Paris. The first commercial recording of the Mass, by the British group I Fagiolini, was released in March 2011, and won a Gramophone Award, and a Diapason D'Or de L'Année A second recording followed in 2012 directed by Hervé Niquet and prepared by Dominique Visse.

Striggio was highly influential, as can be seen by the wide distribution of his music in Europe in the late 16th century. His influence was especially large in England; this may have been due in part to his 1567 visit, and also may have been related to the activities of Alfonso Ferrabosco, the Italian madrigalist who was resident in England for most of his life, and helped popularize the Italian style there.

== References and further reading ==
- Butchart, David S. (1981). "The Festive Madrigals of Alessandro Striggio". Proceedings of the Royal Musical Association. 107 (1980–1981). Taylor & Francis, Ltd.: 46–59. doi:10.1093/jrma/107.1.46. JSTOR 766114.
- Iain Fenlon: "Alessandro Striggio", in The New Grove Dictionary of Music and Musicians, ed. Stanley Sadie. 20 vol. London, Macmillan Publishers Ltd., 1980. ISBN 1-56159-174-2
- Iain Fenlon: "Alessandro Striggio", Grove Music Online, ed. L. Macy (Accessed April 21, 2007), (subscription access)
- Gustave Reese, Music in the Renaissance. New York, W.W. Norton & Co., 1954. ISBN 0-393-09530-4
- Iain Fenlon and Hugh Keyte, 'Early Music' July 1980. Reference in CD liner notes to Spem in Alium by Tallis Scholars, Gimell CDGIM 006.
- Davitt Moroney, "Alessandro Striggio's Mass in Forty and Sixty Parts". Journal of the American Musicological Society, Vol. 60 No. 1., pp. 1–69. Spring 2007. ISSN 0003-0139

=== Recording ===
- Alessandro Striggio and others, Mass for 40 & 60 voices on YouTube
- "La Caccia". "Il cicalamento delle donne al bucato" – on Banchieri Festino R. Alessandrini 1995 (Opus111)
- "Il gioco di primiera", about the perils of gambling – performed by Kings Singers on Madrigal History Tour documentary
