= John La Bouchardière =

John La Bouchardière is a British opera, film and television director.

== Biography ==
La Bouchardière was a chorister at Magdalen College, Oxford, studied at the University of Birmingham and was a staff director at English National Opera. He also spent several years working internationally as an assistant and revival director in opera, for such companies as the BBC, Channel 4, New Israeli Opera, Opera Graz, Opéra National du Rhin, Opera North, Scottish Opera, Teatro Liceu (Barcelona), Vlaamse Opera, Teatro São Carlos (Lisbon), La Fenice and Opera Zurich.

His productions include Semele (Scottish Opera and Florentine Opera, Milwaukee), Eugene Onegin, Tamerlano (Scottish Opera), Rigoletto (Opera Holland Park), Don Giovanni (Operosa Festival, Varna, Bulgaria), Carmen (Nordfjord, Norway), Cavalli's Giasone (Royal Academy of Music), and Mozart's Idomeneo (Florentine Opera).

He is best known for The Full Monteverdi, his acclaimed reworking of Monteverdi's Fourth book of Madrigals with I Fagiolini, winning a Royal Philharmonic Society Award in 2006; it toured widely as a live production, including a run of performances at Lincoln Center for Performing Arts, New York City. This was released in a film version in 2007 and has been awarded a Choc du Monde de la Musique.; La Bouchardière was creative director at Polyphonic Films from 2006 to 2021 and created Music Room, a classical music television series for the cable channel Sky Arts. His last collaboration with Polyphonic Films and I Fagiolini was his short film The Stag Hunt (based on La chasse by Clément Janequin).

He returned to Lincoln Center for Performing Arts, New York in July 2013 to direct a controversial reimagining of Lera Auerbach's a cappella opera The Blind (based on the symbolist play by Maurice Maeterlinck), for which the audience was blindfolded throughout. In 2014, he directed a new production of John Adams' El Niño for Spoleto Festival USA, which was widely praised for taking a very different approach from that of its original director, Peter Sellars. and returned to Spoleto Festival in 2019 to direct the first theatrical staging of Joby Talbot's Path of Miracles. Continuing his interest in dramatising religious material, La Bouchardière has recently collaborated with the British ensemble Solomon's Knot on Bach's St Matthew Passion in venues across the UK and Europe, including Leipzig, Weimar, Snape Maltings and Wigmore Hall.
