= Orazio Vecchi =

Italian composer (1550–1605)

Orazio Vecchi (6 December 1550 (baptized) in Modena – 19 February 1605) was an Italian composer of the late Renaissance. He is most famous for his madrigal comedies, particularly L'Amfiparnaso.

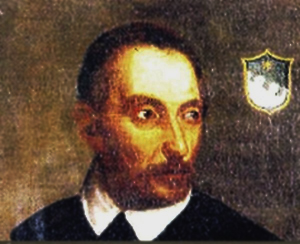
Orazio Vecchi.

== Life ==
He was born in Modena, and studied with Salvatore Essenga, a Servite friar there. In addition he prepared for holy orders with early education at the Benedictine monastery, and took holy orders sometime before 1577.

By the end of the 1570s he was well-connected with the composers of the Venetian school (for example Claudio Merulo and Giovanni Gabrieli) since he collaborated with them in writing a sestina for a ducal marriage. During this period he accompanied Count Baldassare Rangoni on his travels, going to Bergamo and Brescia.

He was maestro di cappella (director of music) at the Salò cathedral between 1581 and 1584. Following this, he was the choirmaster at the cathedral of Reggio Emilia, until 1586. In that year he moved to Correggio where he was appointed canon of the cathedral there; he composed copiously during his time there, though he felt isolated from the major musical centers of Italy such as Rome, Venice, Florence and Ferrara. Eventually he attempted to correct this by moving back to Modena, where he attained the rank of mansionario (a priest who also had charge of the choir). He seems to have had considerable financial difficulties during this time, which he alluded to in his letters, and occasionally in his compositions.

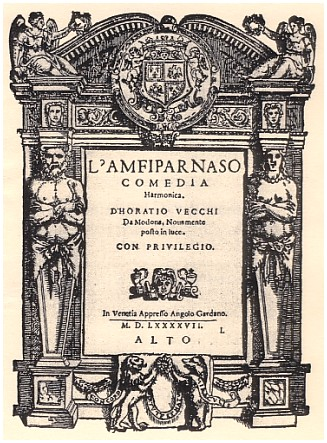
Title page of the madrigal comedy L'Amfiparnaso by Orazio Vecchi.

In 1594 his madrigal comedy, L'Amfiparnaso, premiered in Modena and was published in 1597 in a lavishly illustrated edition. That same year he visited Venice, where he published a collection of canzonette. In addition he published a huge amount of other music that same year, evidently his complete production of the last 16 years in Correggio and the other towns. One of the pieces he published was L'Amfiparnaso, which is his best-known composition.

Duke Cesare d'Este hired Vecchi in 1598 to be his maestro di corte, i.e. the master of music at his court, and Vecchi accompanied him to Rome and Florence in 1600; while in Florence he heard Jacopo Peri's opera Euridice. Afterwards he returned to Modena where he continued to serve in the cathedral until his death in 1605.

== Music and influence ==
Vecchi was renowned for his madrigals, especially his grouping of them together in a new form called the "madrigal comedy." This was a light, popular, and dramatic entertainment form of the late 16th century, sometimes regarded as one of the precursors to opera.

In addition, Vecchi published books of canzonette, a lighter alternative to the madrigal, midway in complexity and seriousness between it and the villanella. He also composed serious madrigals, though not in the quantity of composers like Marenzio, as well as some sacred music. The sacred music in particular shows the influence of the Venetian school, with polychoral writing as well as contrasting duple- versus triple-time sections.

== Compositions published in Venice ==
=== Secular music ===
- Canzonette a 3 voci di Horatio Vecchi et di G. Capilupi (1597; ristampa 1606)
- Canzonette Libro I a 4 voci (1580)
- Canzonette Libro II 4 voci (1580)
- Canzonette Libro III 4 voci (1585)
- Canzonette Libro IV a 4 voci (1590)
- Canzonette Libro I a 6 voci (1587)
- Madrigali a 6 voci Libro I (1583)
- Madrigali a 5 voci Libro I (1589)
- Selva di varia ricreatione nella quale si contengono varii soggetti a 3-10 voci, cioè madrigali, capricci, balli, arie, iustiniane, canzonette, fantasie, serenate, dialoghi, un lotto amoroso, con una battaglia a 10 nel fine e accomodatovi la intavolatura di Liuto alle arie, ai balli e alle canzonette (1590)
- L'amfiparnaso, comedia Harmonica a 5 voci (1597)
- Convito musicale nel quale si contengono vari soggetti et capricci a 3-8 voci, cioè madrigali, canzonette, villotte, iustiniane et dialoghi (1597)
- Le veglie di Siena overo i vari umori della musica moderna a 3-6 voci, composte e divise in due piacevole e grave (1604)

=== Sacred music ===
- Lamentationes cum 4 paribus vox (1587)
- Motecta 4-6 et 8 voci Libro I (1590)
- Sacrarum cantionum 5-8 voci Libro II (1597)
- Hymni qui per totum annum in Ecclesia Romana concinuntur, partim brevi stilo super plano cantu, partim proprio marte... elaborati cum 4 vox (1604)
- Missarum 6 et 8 vox Libro I. Per Paulum Bravusium mutinensem ejus discipulum amatissimum primum in lucem editus (1607)

=== Manuscripts ===
- Missa Julia duobus choris cum 8 voci
- Magnificat a 5 voci

== References and further reading ==
- Article "Orazio Vecchi," in The New Grove Dictionary of Music and Musicians, ed. Stanley Sadie. 20 vol. London, Macmillan Publishers Ltd., 1980. ISBN 1-56159-174-2
- Gustave Reese, Music in the Renaissance. New York, W.W. Norton & Co., 1954. ISBN 0-393-09530-4
