= I Fagiolini =

British vocal ensemble

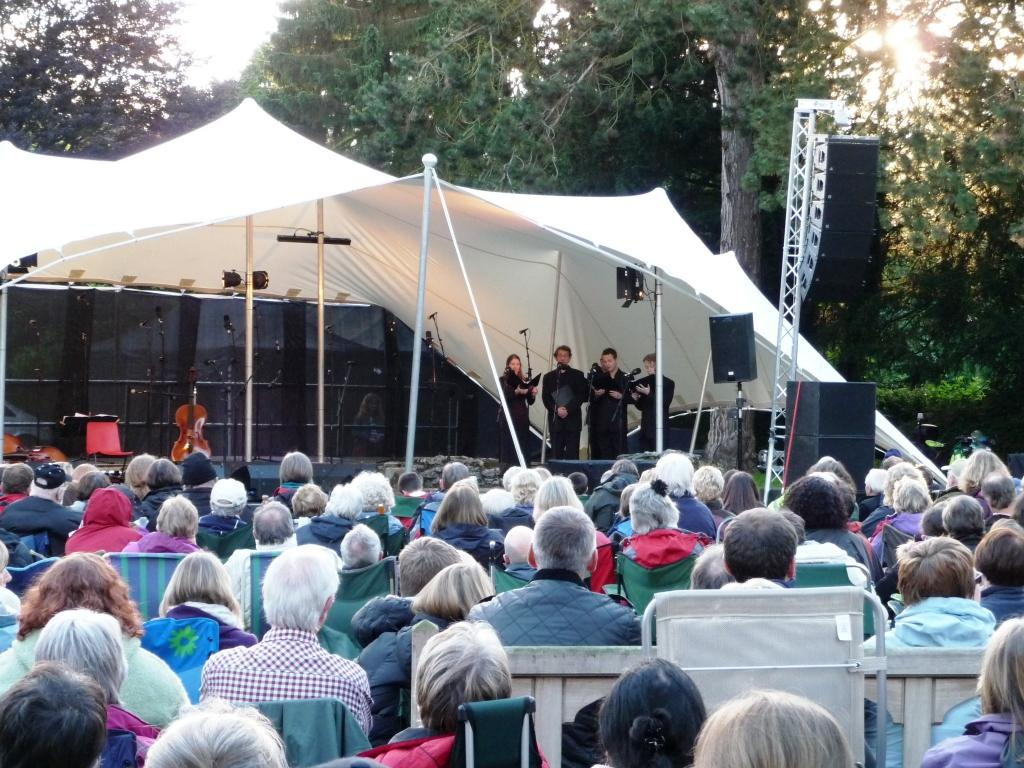
- I Fagiolini performing at Much Wenlock in 2022

Background information
- Origin: Oxford, England
- Genres: Early music, Renaissance music, Contemporary music
- Years active: 1986–present
- Labels: Chandos Records, Coro Records
- Members: Robert Hollingworth - Director; Anna Crookes - Soprano; Julia Doyle - Soprano; Rebecca Lea - Soprano; Emma Tring - Soprano; Clare Wilkinson - Mezzo-soprano; William Purefoy - Counter-Tenor; Richard Wyn Roberts - Counter-Tenor; Matthew Long - Tenor; Nicholas Hurndall Smith - Tenor; Nicholas Mulroy - Tenor; Greg Skidmore - Baritone; Eamonn Dougan - Baritone; Charles Gibbs - Bass
- Past members: Robin Blaze; Matthew Brook; Carys Lane; Giles Underwood; Roderick Williams; Hugh Wilson
- Website: Official website

I Fagiolini is a British vocal ensemble specialising in early music and contemporary music. Founded by Robert Hollingworth at Oxford in 1986, the group won the UK Early Music Network’s Young Artists’ Competition in 1988 and a Royal Philharmonic Society Award in 2006. It has an international reputation for presenting music in unusual ways, for example in John La Bouchardière's production and film The Full Monteverdi. I Fagiolini has recorded over 25 CDs, as well as DVDs of The Full Monteverdi and Orazio Vecchi's L'Amfiparnaso with Simon Callow.

The group has recorded the recently found 40-part mass (1566) by Striggio. The CD was released in March 2011 and won the Early Music category in the 2011 Gramophone Awards and a Diapason d'Or de l'Année.

In 2023 I Fagiolini embarked on a project to record the multi-choir music of Orazio Benevoli. The third CD in this series, released in February 2026, was described by Gramophone magazine as "peak I Fagiolini" and "quite superb".

== Frequent guests ==
- Barokksolistene - Period instruments
- David Miller - Lute
- Catherine Pierron - Harpsichord
- Eligio Quinteiro - Lute
- Joy Smith Harp

== Selected recordings ==
- Orazio Benevoli, Tu Es Petrus, Mass for Four Choirs (2024) CORO
- Victoria, Tenebrae Responsories (2024) CORO
- John Wilbye, Draw On Sweet Night (2022) CORO
- Gabrieli, Monteverdi, Palestrina, Viadana: 1612 Italian Vespers (2012) CD Decca Classics 478 3506
- Alessandro Striggio: 40 Part Mass (2011) - CD+DVD Decca Decca Classics 478 2734
- Claudio Monteverdi: Sweet Torment (2009) - CD Chandos CHAN 0760
- Claudio Monteverdi: Fire & Ashes (2008) - CD Chandos CHAN 0749
- Claudio Monteverdi: The Full Monteverdi (2007) - DVD Naxos 2.110224
- Claudio Monteverdi: Flaming Heart (2006) - CD Chandos CHAN 0730
- Orazio Vecchi: L'Amfiparnaso (2004) - DVD Chandos CHDVD 5029

== Prizes and awards ==
- BBC Music Magazine Recording of the Month, April 2024, for Benevoli's mass Tu Es Petrus
- Diapason D'Or de L'Année 2011 for Striggio Mass in 40 Parts
- Gramophone Early Music Award 2011 for Striggio Mass in 40 Parts
- Choc du Monde de la Musique for The Full Monteverdi (2008)
- Royal Philharmonic Society Ensemble of the year (2006)
- UK Early Music Network’s Young Artists’ Competition (1988)
