= The Full Monteverdi =

- Directed by: John La Bouchardière
- Written by: John La Bouchardière
- Produced by: Greg Browning
- Starring: I Fagiolini
- Cinematography: Nick Gordon Smith
- Music by: Claudio Monteverdi
- Distributed by: Polyphonic Films Ltd
- Release date: 14 September 2007
- Running time: 60
- Country: United Kingdom
- Language: Italian

The Full Monteverdi is a 2007 British film written and directed by John La Bouchardière and based on his live production of the same name, itself based on Claudio Monteverdi's fourth book of madrigals (1603) which, in turn, is a collection of settings of poems by such Italian Renaissance poets as Giovanni Battista Guarini, Ottavio Rinuccini and Torquato Tasso. The film features the British vocal ensemble I Fagiolini and the original cast of actors from the live production. The title is a play on the name of the 1997 film The Full Monty – a pun vindicated, according to academic Peter Conrad, by The Full Monteverdi's "raw, emotional striptease".

The plot concerns six couples who are breaking up simultaneously in a restaurant. During the course of their meals, revelations about the past drive the couples to separation. The apparently avant-garde structure and nonlinear narrative of the film are based in the musical material, which is often of highly contrapuntal polyphony, and follows the stories of the different couples in a manner similar to the vocal interchanges in the madrigals.

== Production ==
Shot in HD on location in Bristol, Cheltenham, Gloucester and London, including the London Eye, the central restaurant scenes were filmed on a studio set designed by Chloe Lamford. The sound was recorded in advance and lip-synched in post-production.

== Release ==
The Full Monteverdi had a limited initial theatrical release, primarily through music festivals. It has been broadcast in Australia, Canada, the Czech Republic, Estonia, Finland, New Zealand, Norway, Poland, Spain, Sweden and the U.K. The film was released on DVD by Naxos Records.

The film was given a further theatrical release in South Africa by Ster-Kinekor, opening on 2 April 2010, and in New Zealand by Rialto Distribution, on 24 June 2010.

== Critical reception ==
The film's reception was largely favourable, particularly from classical music critics, though some found La Bouchardière's matching of contemporary realism with Renaissance a cappella music uncomfortable; most acclaimed it for its innovation, fidelity to the spirit of the original music and unrelenting emotional depth. Film and literary scholar William E.B. Verrone hailed The Full Monteverdi as "both visually and narratively dazzling... an innovative and experimental film, the kind of adaptation that rarely is attempted or gets made: one that flies in the face of convention daring to be different." It was awarded a Choc du Monde de la Musique.
