= Davitt Moroney =

British musician (born 1950)

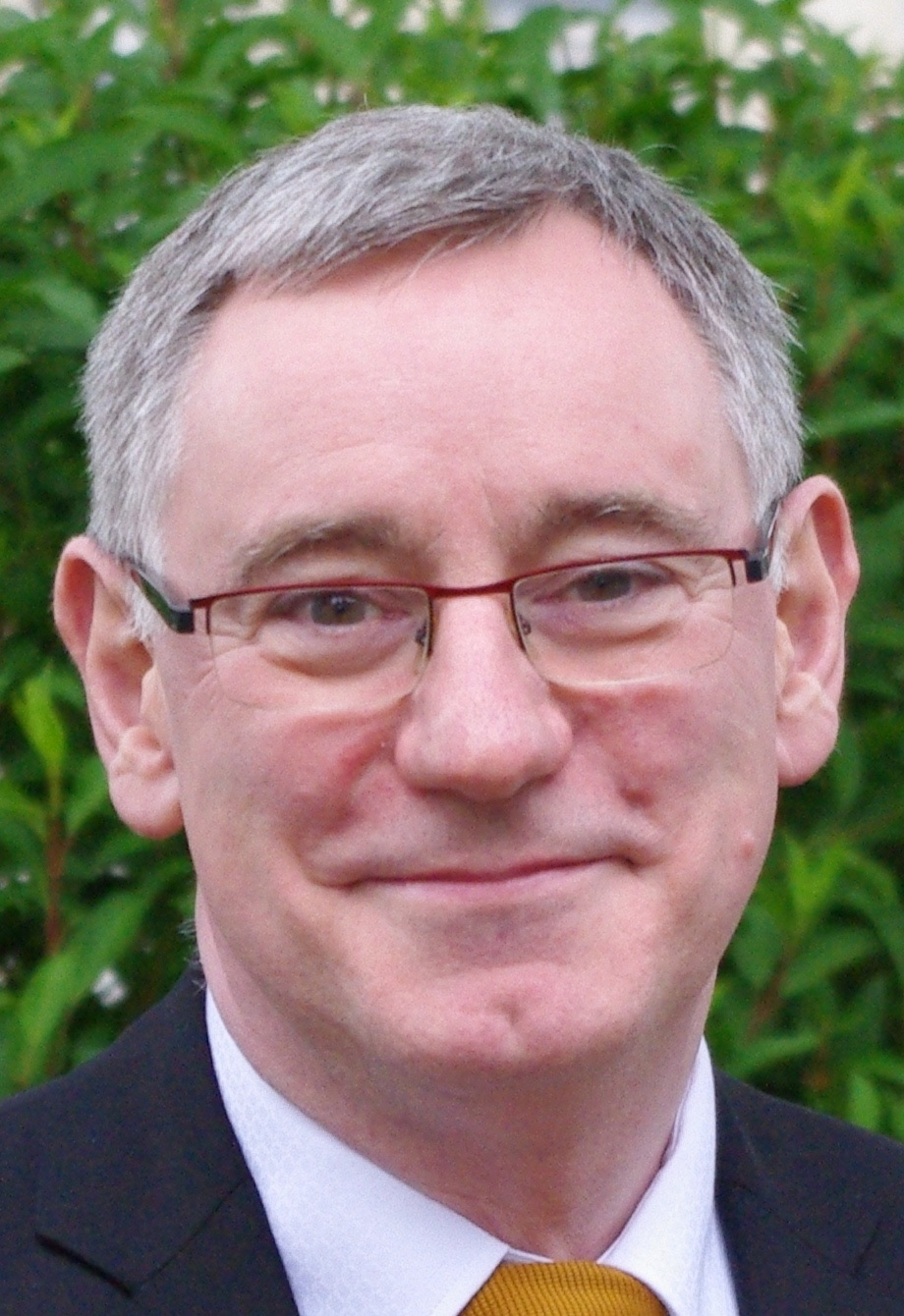
Davitt Moroney, on the day of his recital in La Hulpe, Belgium, on 17 June 2011

Davitt Moroney (born 23 December 1950) is a British-born and educated musicologist, harpsichordist and organist. His parents were of Irish and Italian extraction – his father was an executive with the Anglo-Dutch Unilever conglomerate. From 1968 onward, he undertook his undergraduate and graduate studies in musicology at King's College London, the faculty of which was headed by Thurston Dart, a great influence on the world of early music. Moroney later pursued advanced harpsichord studies with Kenneth Gilbert and Gustav Leonhardt. Moroney also holds performance and teaching diplomas (1974) from the Royal Academy of Music and the Royal College of Music. After earning his PhD in musicology from the University of California, Berkeley in 1980 with a thesis on the music of Thomas Tallis and William Byrd, he returned to Paris and worked mainly as a freelance performer until returning to the United States to serve on the faculty at UC Berkeley in 2001.

He has given the first modern performances of much repertoire; the Livre de tablature de Clavescin by Marc Roger Normand Couperin of Turin, whose works he identified in 1997, the complete organ works of Louis Couperin and a newly discovered autograph manuscript of harpsichord music by Henry Purcell.

He has recorded Bach, Biber, Couperin, and others. He won the 2000 Gramophone Early Music award for his recording of the complete keyboard music of William Byrd (see also: My Ladye Nevells Booke and The Fitzwilliam Virginal Book), published on Hyperion Records, which he performed on harpsichord, chamber organ, church organ, clavichord, and muselar.

He has published critical editions of the work of various baroque composers, including a keyboard edition (and his own recording) of Johann Sebastian Bach's The Art of Fugue that contains his own completion of the final unfinished fugue. He has also rediscovered the 40 and 60 part mass Missa sopra Ecco sì beato giorno by Alessandro Striggio, lost since the 17th century, of which he conducted what he believed to be the first performance since the 16th century on 17 July 2007 at the BBC Proms in London.

Until 2001, he was also director of Éditions de l'Oiseau-Lyre, the French-Australian music publishing company which sold its LP business to Decca Classics in 1970.
