= Peter McGarr =

English classical composer and teacher

Peter McGarr is an English classical composer and teacher, working in the English experimental tradition and inspired by Northern English landscape and culture.

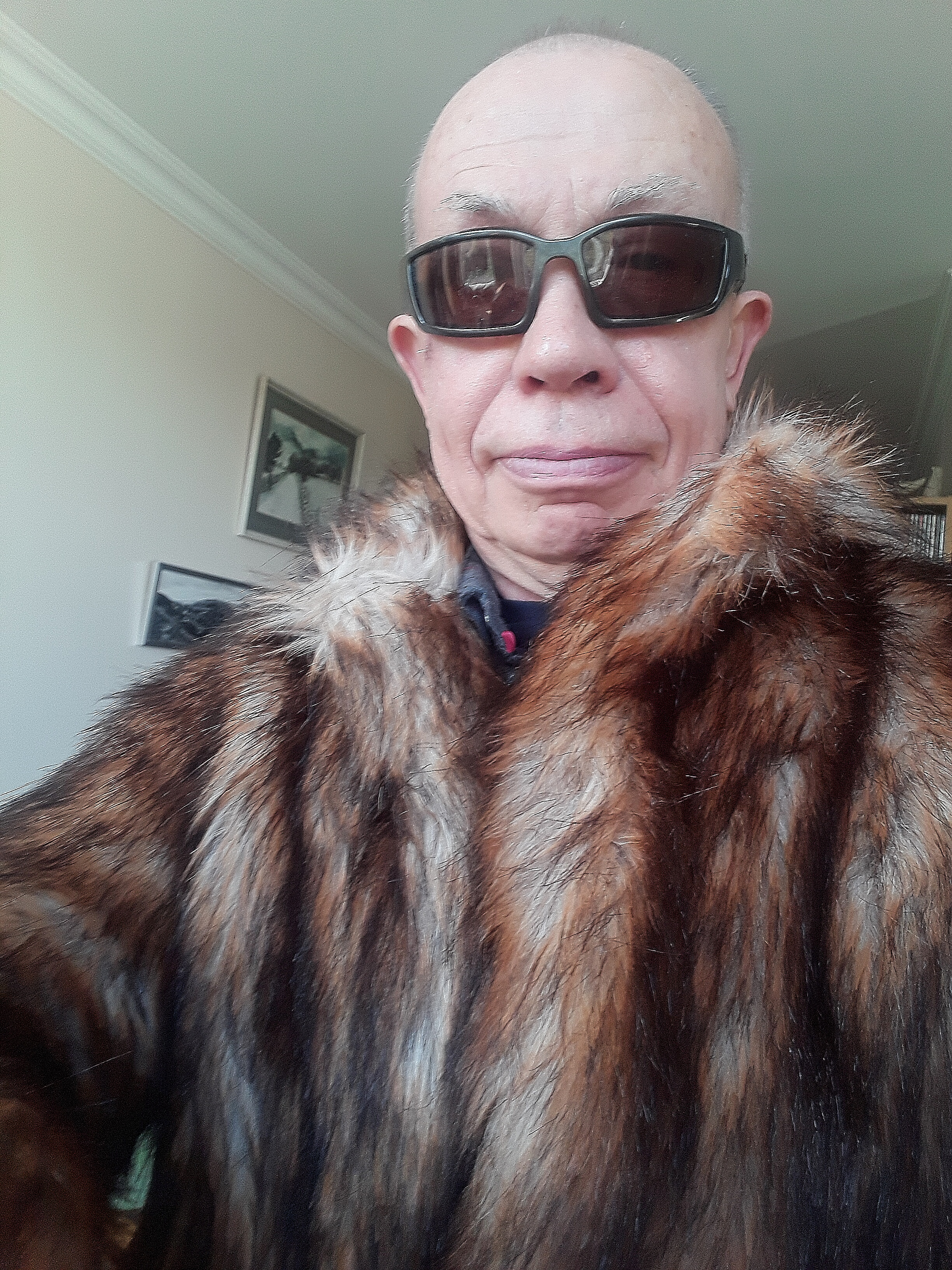
Photo of English composer, Peter McGarr, taken in 2022

== Biography ==
McGarr was born in Openshaw, Manchester, and attended Ducie Technical High School for Boys, now Manchester Academy. He studied Music and Dance at Mather College (now part of Manchester University) and is self-taught in composition. For several years he taught steel pan, achieving the Outstanding Performance Award from Music for Youth for his steel band 'Orchestral Steel', appearing in the School Proms at the Royal Albert Hall in 1984 and 1986. He has received the Butterworth Prize for Composition from the Society for the Promotion of New Music and has been nominated for Music Teacher of the Year, the British Composer Awards, the Paul Hamlyn foundation Awards and the Civitella Ranieri Foundation Fellowship. He has led composition workshops at the Edinburgh International Festival and also engaged extensively with musical activities involving the elderly and people with dementia. His complete handwritten scores are held at Tameside Local Studies and Archive Centre, Ashton-under-Lyne

== Style and influences ==
McGarr has been influenced by the sounds and changing culture of the Northern English people and landscape. His piece "Hillclouds, Rainwindows and Vanishing Orchestras" has been described as "integrat[ing] tremolo sounds into a subtle patchwork of changing harmonies".

== Works and commissions ==
He has received performances and commissions from many leading musicians, orchestras and festivals including the BBC Proms at the Royal Albert Hall, London Sinfonietta, Joanna MacGregor, Ensemble Bash, Three Strange Angels, Passacaglia, oboeworks, Cappella Nova, The Crossing, Kevin Bowyer, Ruth Morley, and Emily Andrews.

He was commissioned by the Tallis Festival to write a 40-part companion piece to Thomas Tallis's Spem in alium. The resulting work, Lindisfarne Love Song (also called Love You Big as the Sky) included poems about Lindisfarne, diary notes and the detailed geography of the area including shipwrecks and lighthouses. An on-line campaign has since started, Lybats, to secure a performance of the piece on its "spiritual home" of Lindisfarne.

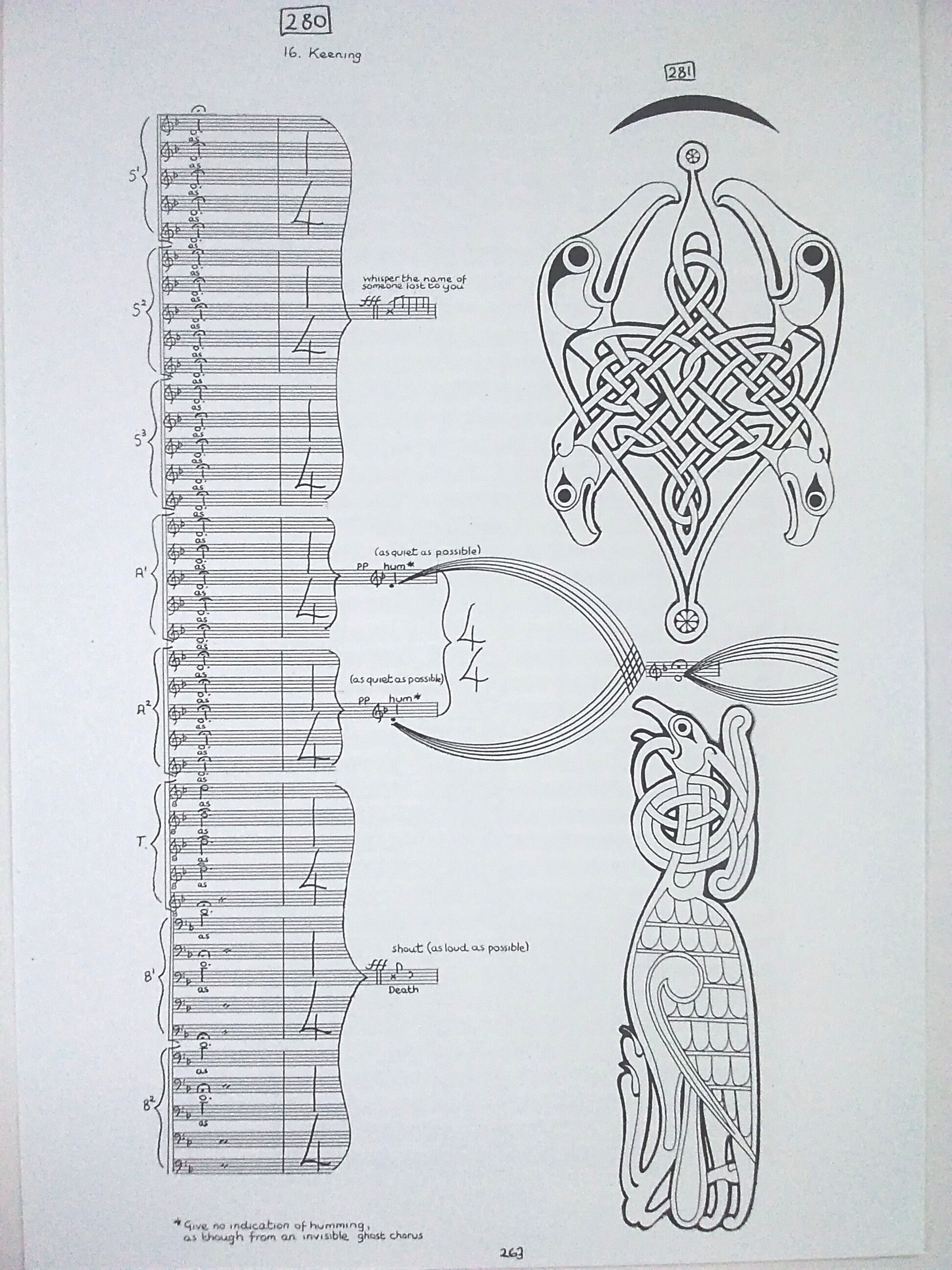
40 part motet, Lindisfarne Lovesong, climax point

The Bath International Music Festival commissioned its largest ever piece; a choral work from McGarr, to celebrate the festival's 60th anniversary. The work was Homesongs and scored for over a 1,000 voices.

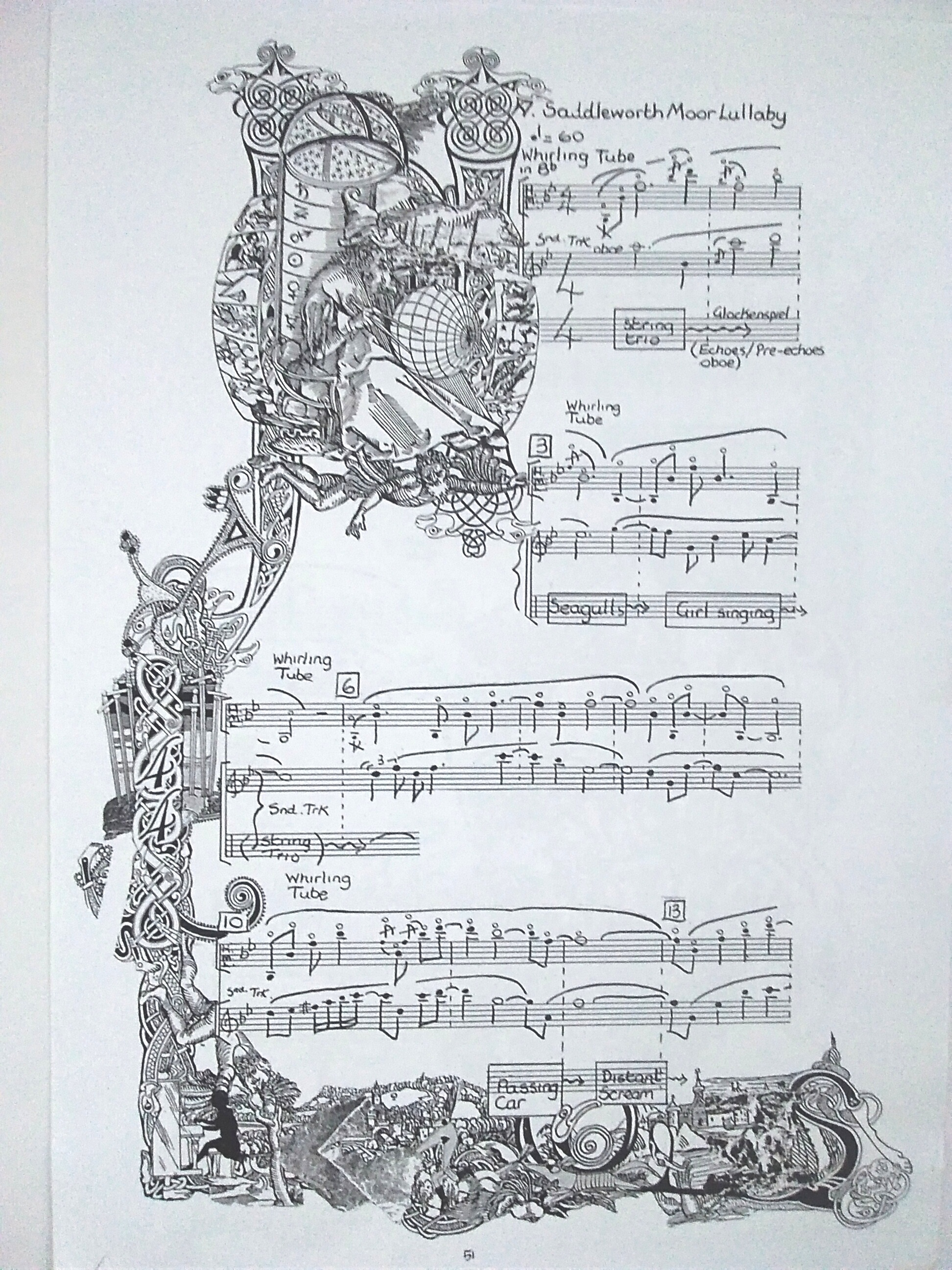
Saddleworth Moor Song, first page

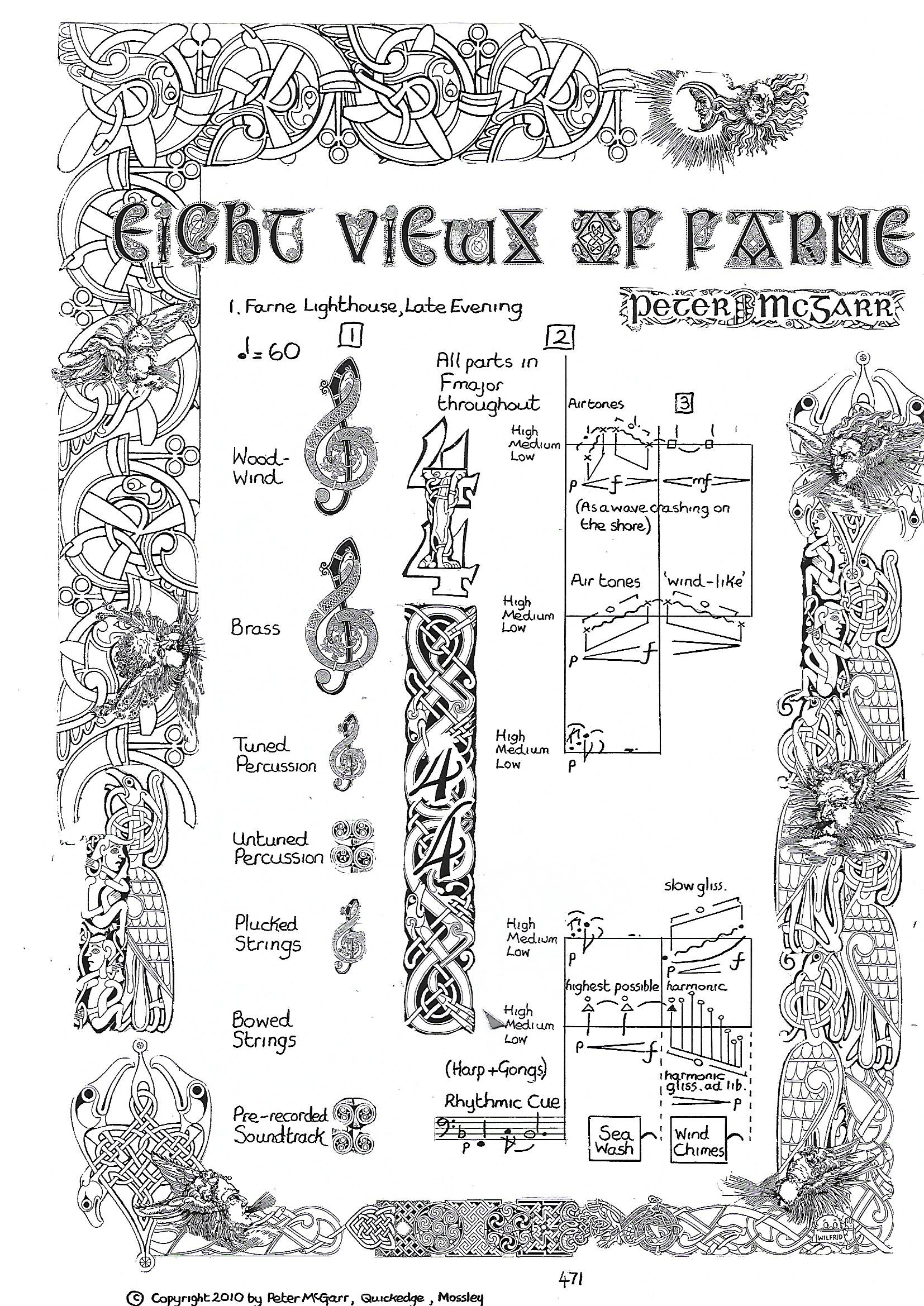
'Eight Views of Farne', from 'Homesongs'

McGarr won the 2013–14 British Composer Awards (Making Music Category) for his piece Dry Stone Walls of Yorkshire, written for orchestra with soundtrack and features field recordings made on Saddleworth Moor.

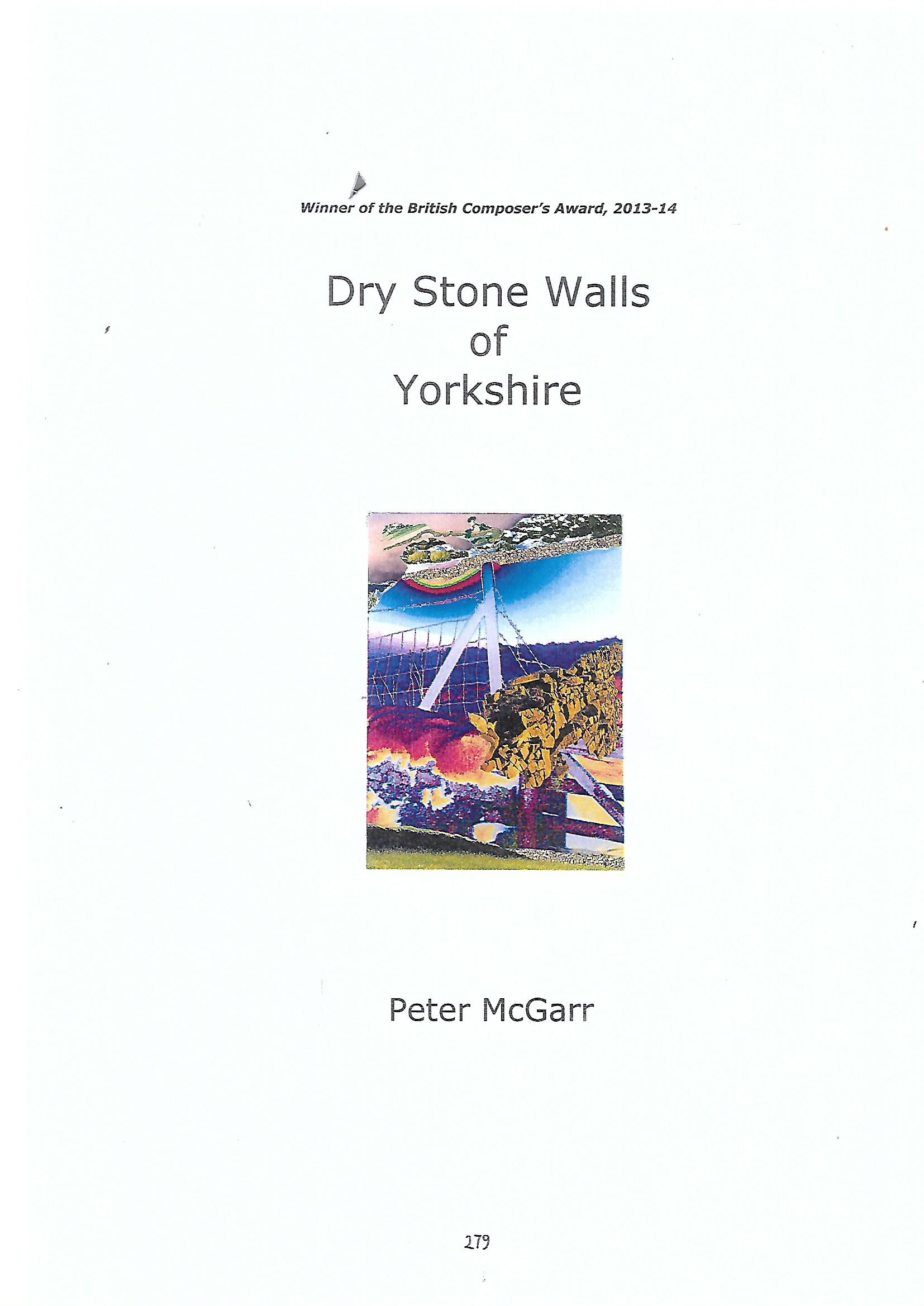
Frontispiece to 'Drystone Walls of Yorkshire'

== Selected works ==
- The Acoustics of Morecambe Bay for Percussion Quartet
- Creating a Wildflower Garden (Wildflower Street) for orchestra
- Dreaming England for mixed choir
- Lindisfarne Love Song (Love You Big as the Sky) for 40-part choir
- Sweet Steel Alone for solo tenor steel pan
- Tidelines for Javanese gamelan
- Night Scented Stock for percussion and piano
- Audlem Sonatas for solo percussion
- Sound Asleep for percussion quartet
- Vanishing Games for oboe quartet
- The Buried Dreams of Our Lives for baroque ensemble
- Something Lost for flute and piano
- Eleven Nights with Glenn Gould for solo piano

== Selected recordings ==
- Something Lost (Sarah Brooke, flute; Elizabeth Burley, piano / British Music Label BML031)
- Dreaming England / Beautiful Days (Exmoor Singers of London: conductor James Jarvis)
- Vanishing Games (Oboe Quartet: oboeworks. / Dinmore Records DRD 066)
- Fieldthread (Flutes d'Accordes / Amalie Records ALACD 1202)
- Memory Trace (Tuba Quartet; Tubalate / TCD 5)
- Homesongs (Collected soundtracks / Broken Scissor Records BSR 01457)
- Sound Asleep (Ensemble Bash / SignumSIGCD 294)
