= Clare Wilkinson =

English singer

- Born: Manchester, England
- Occupation: Mezzo-soprano

Clare Wilkinson (born in Manchester, England) is an English mezzo-soprano specialising in Baroque and Renaissance music.

Her recent CD recordings are

- Mynstrelles with Straunge Sounds with the Rose Consort of Viols (Delphian Records)
- Henry's Music: Motets from a Royal Choirbook with Alamire (Obsidian)
- Anne Boleyn's Songbook with Alamire (Obsidian)
- Byrd 1589 with Alamire (Inventa Records)
- Bach's Magnificat with the Dunedin Consort (Linn Records)
- Adoramus Te with the Rose Consort of Viols (Deux-Elles Limited)
- Divine Madness: Souls in Exile with Sofie Vanden Eynde and Moneim Adwan (Cypres)
- The Sunlight on the Garden: The Songs of Stephen Wilkinson (Signum Records)
- The Silken Tent with Fretwork (Signum Records)
- Ballads within a Dream (deutsche harmonia mundi)
- Handel: Messiah (Dublin Version, 1742) with Dunedin Consort, John Butt (Linn Records)
- J.S. Bach: Matthew Passion (Final Performing Version, c. 1742) with Dunedin Consort, John Butt (Linn Records)
- J.S. Bach: John Passion, Reconstruction of Bach's Passion Liturgy with Dunedin Consort, John Butt (Linn Records)
- J.S. Bach: Christmas Oratorio with Dunedin Consort, John Butt (Linn Records)
