= Robert Hollingworth (musician) =

British choral director (born 1966)

Robert Hollingworth (born 19 May 1966) is a British choral director, singer, conductor, broadcaster and academic. He is the founder and director of the vocal ensemble I Fagiolini and a Reader in Music at the University of York. His main focus is on music of the Renaissance and Early Baroque periods.

== Career ==
Hollingworth began his musical career as a boy chorister at Hereford Cathedral. He read music at New College, Oxford, and then studied at the Guildhall School of Music and Drama. Hollingworth founded the vocal ensemble I Fagiolini in 1986 while at Oxford, and has been their director for almost forty years. In addition to conventional audio recordings, the group also presents early music in a novel, often theatrical manner, both in live performances and via video recordings. The Guardian has described their performances as 'startlingly intense' and 'quite magical'. Hollingworth has conducted a range of British and European orchestras and choirs, including the Academy of Ancient Music, The English Concert, the BBC Concert Orchestra, Accentus, NDR Chor, and RIAS Kammerchor. Hollingworth is a Reader in Music at the University of York, where he directs a chamber choir known as The 24 and leads a master's programme in solo-voice ensemble singing.

== Recordings and broadcasting ==
Hollingworth has directed numerous recordings with I Fagiolini. His Monteverdi projects have received critical recognition for their scholarship and creativity. His most recent recording project is concerned with the multi-choir masses of the little-known 17th century Italian composer Orazio Benevoli. He has presented and contributed to several broadcasts for BBC Radio 3, mainly on the subject of early music. He also presents a series of podcasts, Choral Chihuahua, alongside his I Fagiolini colleagues Eamonn Dougan and Nicholas Mulroy.

== Other activities ==
During COVID lockdown, Hollingworth produced a series of YouTube videos, #SingTheScore, in which he introduces a piece of music with his trademark style combining scholarship with entertainment. Viewers are then encouraged to sing along with a performance of the work by I Fagiolini, while the musical score is displayed on the screen.

Robert Hollingworth also regularly leads workshops for amateur musical groups such as the Early Music Fora. He is also the director of the annual Stour Music Festival.
