= Is This What We Want? =

2025 protest album by various artists

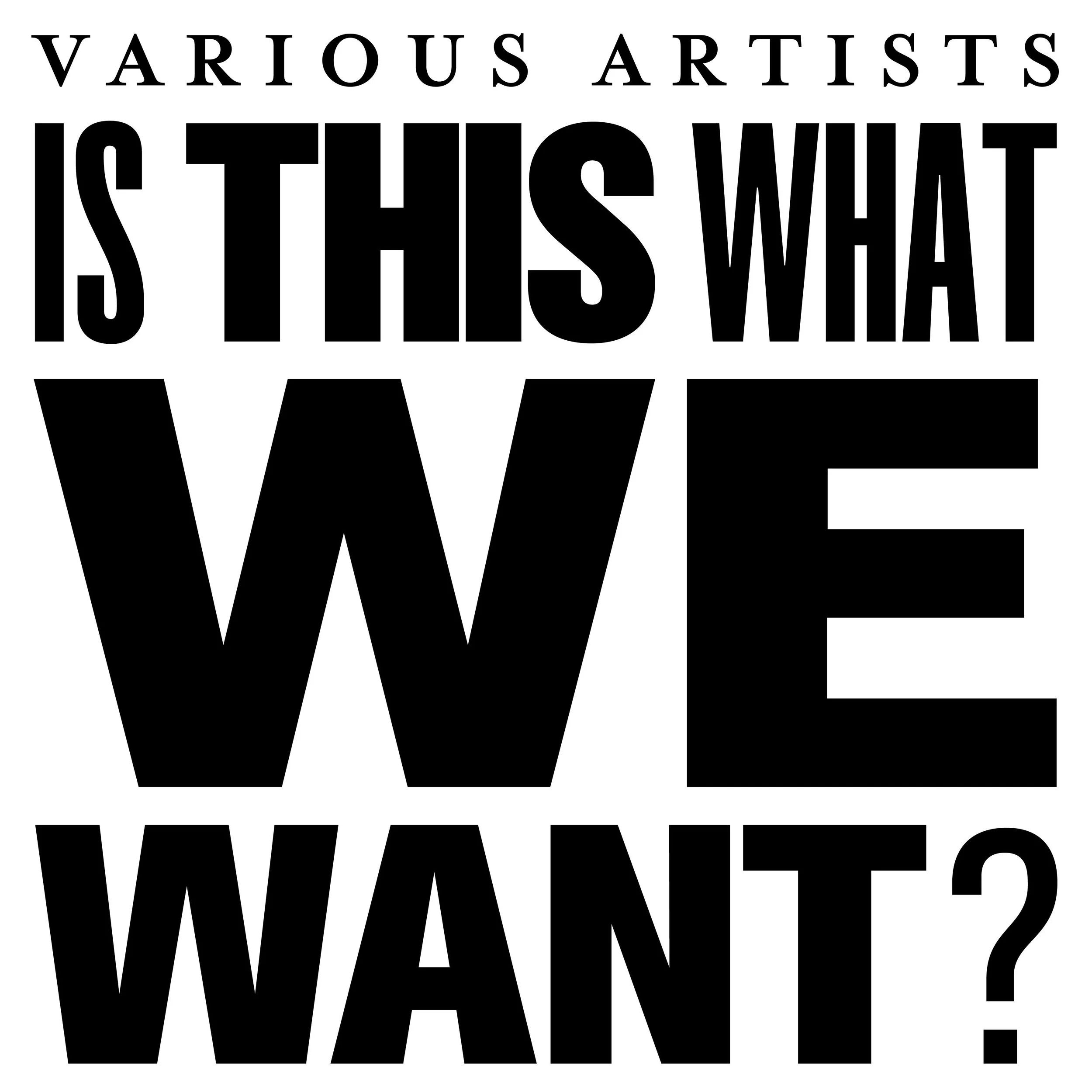

Studio album by various artists
- Released: 25 February 2025
- Genre: Ambient • protest music
- Length: 47:07
- Label: VMG
- Producer: Beni Giles

Is This What We Want? is an album by various artists released on 25 February 2025 through Virgin Music Group. It consists of ambient noise recorded in recording studios, protesting the use of unlicensed copyrighted work to train artificial intelligence. The track titles form the sentence "The British Government must not legalise music theft to benefit AI companies". Profits from the album go toward the UK charity Help Musicians.

== Background ==
Rapid progress in AI technology, constituting an AI boom, was brought to public attention in the early 2020s by text-to-image models such as DALL-E, Midjourney, and Stable Diffusion, which were able to generate complex images that convincingly resembled human-made artworks. The proliferation of such image generation algorithms coincided with the release of GPT-3 and development of GPT-4, advanced large language models which produce highly convincing text. These transformer-based models designed to create new content from prompts are collectively called generative artificial intelligence, and they require vast sets of training data. This data often consists of text, images, and other media scraped from the web, prompting concerns that the AI products may violate intellectual property rights.

Suno AI and Udio, two AI startups whose products generate music recordings following user-submitted prompts, were sued in 2024 by Sony Music, Warner Music Group, and Universal Music Group, who alleged that the companies used copyrighted recordings in their training data without authorization.

In December 2024, the UK government announced a consultation on copyright and AI, outlining a preferred approach that would see the introduction of a data mining copyright exception with a rights reservation package for rights holders. In the months following the announcement of the consultation, a number of prominent musicians warned of the threat it posed to musicians, including Paul McCartney and Elton John.

== Content ==
The standard version of Is This What We Want? consists of 12 tracks, each uncredited. The tracks consist of ambient noise recorded in recording studios. The track titles form the sentence "The British Government must not legalise music theft to benefit AI companies", with the implication that original music will be silenced if AI companies exploit musicians' intellectual property. The album was organised by the British composer Ed Newton-Rex, who had previously worked at Stable Diffusion's parent company, Stability AI, and produced by freelance producer Beni Giles. Giles said that the record was not intended to be silent, but rather to represent "an absence of music and musicians", and to "amplify the visceral sense of lack and draw attention to the environment". He briefed the artists on how they should record the album, telling them to aim for "tumbleweed through a ghost town" rather than "the dead silence of space", and to introduce incidental background noise if necessary, such as an electric fan, amplifier, or outside sound from an open door or window. Giles told the artists to avoid "obvious, intentional sounds" such as talking or playing instruments, or "loud or distracting noises that dominate the space", saying that "we want atmosphere, not static".

For the vinyl edition, released in November 2025, Paul McCartney recorded an additional track as the B-side, comprising tape hiss and "indeterminate clattering".

== Chart performance ==
Is This What We Want? debuted at number 38 on the UK Albums Downloads Chart.

== Track listing ==
Is This What We Want? – Digital edition
No.	Title	Length
1.	"The"	4:00
2.	"British"	4:08
3.	"Government"	3:59
4.	"Must"	4:01
5.	"Not"	3:14
6.	"Legalise"	3:52
7.	"Music"	4:28
8.	"Theft"	3:56
9.	"To"	4:16
10.	"Benefit"	3:50
11.	"AI"	3:36
12.	"Companies"	3:57
Total length:		47:17

A limited edition 12" vinyl album was released and distributed by The state51 Conspiracy. It features a bonus track of an empty studio by Paul McCartney.

Is This What We Want? – Vinyl edition
No.	Title	Length
13.	"Bonus Track"	2:45
Total length:		50:02

== Artists ==
1000 musicians and ensembles are credited as co-writers on the album, including influential popular music artists such as Kate Bush, Damon Albarn, Tori Amos, Annie Lennox, Pet Shop Boys, Billy Ocean, The Clash, Ed O'Brien of Radiohead, Dan Smith of Bastille, Jamiroquai, Mystery Jets, Imogen Heap and Yusuf/Cat Stevens; as well as prominent classical music artists such as Hans Zimmer, Max Richter, the King's Singers, the Sixteen, John Rutter, and James MacMillan. For the vinyl edition, released in November 2025, Paul McCartney recorded an additional track as the B-side, comprising tape hiss and "indeterminate clattering".

Complete List of 1,000 UK Artists
Artist/Group Name	Role
Beni Giles	Producer
Ed Newton-Rex	Executive Producer
Aaron Shilson, Abbi Phillips, Adam Janota Bzowski, Adam King, Adam Robinson, Adam Wakeman, Adam Wren, Adem Ilhan, Adiescar Chase, Al O’Kane, Alan Bullard, Alan Naudin Levi, Alesia Harris, Alex Lindner, Alex Parsons, Alexander Campkin, Alexander Chance, Alexander Leeming Froudakis, Alexander Rudd, Alexandra Harwood, Alexis Ffrench, Alfie Jackson, Alice Eldridge, Alice Harper, Alison Cotton, Alison Moncrieff-Kelly, Alison Smart Fisher, Allan Clayton, Amanda Lake, Amelia Warner, Amy Balcomb, Amy Bryce, Anchor Lane, Andrew Baker, Andrew Broadbent, Andrew Frampton, Andrew Keeping, Andrew Kingslow, Andrew Knowles, Andrew Macmillan, Andrew Post, Andrew Potterton, Andrew Storer, Andrew Storey, ANDRO, Andy Lumsden, Andy Mackay, Angela Soanes, Ann Elise Smoot, Anna Gregory, Anna Hallett, Anna Lapwood, Anna Neale, Anne Dudley, Anne Nikitin, Annie Lennox, Annina Melissa, Anthony Marks, Anthony Vander West, Antony Kearns, Anyssa Neumann, Ash Howes, Ashley Mason, Ashley Riches, Astral Realm, Atli Örvarsson, Audiojack, Aya Origenes, Baby Queen, Barb Jungr, Barbara Lake, Bashy, Belinda Dalziel, Ben Foster, Ben Haynes, Ben Howard, Ben Morales Frost, Ben Onono, Ben Palmer, Ben Parry, Ben Salisbury, Benedict Nichols, Benjamin Ellin, Benjamin Wallfisch, Billy Ocean, Black Bordello, Blair Mowat, Book of Revelations, Bradley Simpson, Brix Smith, Cameron Sinclair, Caritas Consort, Caroline Kraabel, Caroline Lenton-Ward, Caroline Tyler, Catharine Woodward, Catherine McAteer, Cathy Lou, Cathy Phillips Brady, Cave Conscious, Cécile Frangi, Chad Jackson, Charlie Laffer, Charlie Mole, Chill Milk, Chris Difford, Chris Grady, Chris Greive, Chris Hodgkins, Chris Hutchings, Chris Roe, Chris Smith, Chris Xylo, Christian Mason, Christopher Barnett, Christopher Schlechte-Bond, Ciara Millington, Ciaran Walshe, Cj Pandit, Claire Batchelor Morris, Claire Dibble, Colin Mark Andrews, Connie Tanner, Connor Smither, Corin Buckeridge, Crispin Hunt, Damian Grant, Damon Albarn, Dan Grech-Marguerat, Dan McGrath, Dan Potter, Dan Smith, Dan Watts, Dani Filth, Dani Senior, Dani Sylvia, Daniel Charles Beach, Daniel Hyde, Daniel Pemberton, Daniel Trocmé-Latter, Daniele Cocomazzi, Danielle Hartley, Danni O'Neill, Danny Hampson, Darren Campbell, Darren Fellows, Dave Jago, David Barton, David Bascombe, David Brewis, David Donaldson, David Fawcett, David Holmes, David Hyde, David Julyan, David Lale, David Lynas, David Mackay, David Schweitzer, David Stokes, Dean McGinnes, Deborah Hamilton, Dennis Locorriere, Diana Ambache, DJ Sahil AiM, Dobs Vye, Dominik Scherrer, Dru Masters, Dutch Van Spall, Dylan Williams, ECKOES, Ed Marsh, Ed O'Brien, Edd Holloway, Edmund Butt, Edmund Jolliffe, Eduardo Bombace, Edward Grint, Edward Picton-Turbervill, Edward Rhys-Harry, Edward Woodhouse, Eleanor Cameron, Eleanor Turner, Eleftheria Kotzia, Eliza Marshall, Elizabeth Ball, Elizabeth Cunningham, Elizabeth Slatter, Elizabeth Stratford, Ellen Beth Abdi, Emma Hartsuiker, Emma-Jean Thackray, Emmanuel Ekeng, Eoin Schmidt-Martin, Erika Gundesen, Esther Abrami, Esther Cavett, Esya, Eugenia Georgieva, Eurielle, Ex Cathedra, Fenella Humphreys, Finn Foxell, Fiona Higham, Fionagh Bennet, Firewhorl, Fortesque, Francis Bucknall, Francis Pott, Frankie Plato, freyyyja, Future Cut, Gabriella Swallow, Gareth Baker Thomas, Gary Carpenter, Gary Cole, Gary Yershon, Gavin Greenaway, Geoff Clark, George Bloomfield, Gizmo Varillas, Glasvegas, Gordon Giles, Gordon Thornett, Graham Boyle, Graham Ross, Graham Walker, Graham Wilson, Grahame Maclean, Greg Usek, Gregory J E Sanders, Gus Nicholson, Guy Chadwick, Guy Farley, Guy Johnston, Hannah Barnett, Hannah Koppenburg, Hannah Ockendon-Rowe, Hans Zimmer, Hard Life, Harry Christophers, Heather Elisabeth Bird, Helen Epega, Helen Lynch, Helen Lyon, Helen Neeves, Helen Rathbone, Helena Culliney, Helienne Lindvall, Hetty Snell, Hilda Paredes, Hilgrove Kenrick, Hillbilly Vegas, Ian Arber, Ian Bostridge, Ian Broudie, Ian Hill, Ian Norsworthy, Igor Olejar, Imogen Heap, Imperial College Chamber Choir, Isaac Stuart, Ivor McGregor, Jabun, Jack Hylton (Jnr), Jack Thomas, Jack Wilson, Jacknife Lee, Jacob Collier, Jacob Coton, Jade Leamcharaskul, James Byrne, James Earp, James Hannigan, James Jones, James Lark, James Luxton, James MacMillan, James Morgan, James Oldfield, James Turnbull, James Watson, James Waymont, Jamie Finlay, Jamie Hall, Jamie McVinnie, Jamie Vizard, Jamie Wright, Jamiroquai, Jan Lauren Halen, Jane Warren, Janet Overfield, Jason Garrett, Jason Tarver, JC Stewart, Jenna Brown, Jeremy Cornes, Jeremy Drew, Jeremy Huw Williams, Jeremy Jackman, Jeremy Summerly, Jess Gillam, Jessica Dannheisser, Jessica Rose Weiss, Jill Streater, Jim Clements, Jim Prime, Jimbo Barry, Jimmy Somerville, JKL DUO, Jo Goldsmith-Eteson, Jo Hadler, Joanna Forbes L'Estrange, Joanne Walton, Jobe Baker-Sullivan, Jocelyn Pook, Joe Hearson, Joel Cooper, Johannes Steinray, John Crothers, John Foyle, John Lodge, John Lunn, John Myers, John Pitts, John Powell, John Rutter, John Wilson, Johnny Mortimer, Jon Beattie, Jon King, Jon Opstad, Jonathan Sharif, Jonathan Slatter, Jordan Rakei, Joris de Man, Josephine Oniyama, Josh Nelson, Julian Black, Julian Lloyd Webber, Julian Nott, Julie Cane, Juliette Bausor, Juliette Pochin, Justin Tailor, Karen Newby, Karina Tammy Byrne, Kat Pugh, Kate Birchall, Kate Bush, Kate Leek, Kate St John, Katherine Carter, Katie Richardson, Katy Garner, Kegzi, Kelli-Leigh, Kevin Sargent, Kezia Tomsett, Kiah Gossner, Kieran Brunt, Kim Wilde, King Ed, Kirsty Devaney, Kirsty Oneill, Kiya, Kobus Frick, Låpsley, Laura B, Laura Jones, Laura Rossi, Laurence Warner, Laurie Stras, Lee Sparey, Lee Ward, Leifur James, Leo Popplewell, Leona Naess, Libby Smith, Lin Blakley, Linden Jay, Lindsay Gray, Lindsay Wright, Liz May, Liz Melville, London Choral Sinfonia, London Philharmonic Orchestra, Lorna Dea, Lorne Balfe, Louis Dodd, Louis Lion, Louis Souyave, Louis Thorne, Louise Dodds, Louise Ellinson, Louise Golbey, Lowswimmer, Lucas Vedel, Lucy Makin, Lucy Morrell-Bannan, Lucy Poole, Luke Gordon, Luke Harrison, Luke Morley, Luke Richards, Luke Taylor, Lydia Kenny, Madeleine Mitchell, Magnus Fiennes, Mahaliah Edwards, Malcolm Archer, Manvinder Rattan, Margaret Archibald, Margaret Holtby, Marillion, Mariska Heijboer Castañon, Mark Aldous, Mark Ayres, Mark Choi, Mark Eason, Mark Jordan, Mark Newby-Robson, Mark Russell, Martin Kennedy, Martin Phipps, Martin Seymour, Martyn Ware, Maruja, Mary Cooper, Mat Andasun, Maths Time Joy, Matt Acheson, Matt Dunkley, Matt Kelly, Matt Saxton, Matthew Barley, Matthew Collins, Maurizio Malagnini, Max Cooke, Max Richter, Megan Lewis, Melvyn Tan, Mene Man, MEYY, Mia Angelice Burlinson, Michael Ashcroft, Michael Berkeley, Michael England, Michael J McEvoy, Michael Waldron, Mike Dixon, Mike Holt, Mike Kintish, Mimi Harmer, Minny Pops, Miranda Ostler, Mirco Altenbach, Miriam Sternlicht, Mitesh Khatri, Mr. Scruff, Murray Gold, Mystery Jets, Nancy Elan, Naomi Kimpenu, Naomi Waltham-Smith, Narin Gylman, Natalie McCool, Nathan Fake, Nathan James Dearden, Nathen Durasamy, Neil Barnes, Neil Dennis, Neil Taylor, New Order, Niall McNamee, Nicholas Daniel, Nicholas Hooper, Nicholas Moor, Nick Ferreira, Nick Fitch, Nick Hall, Nick Milburn, Nick Norton-Smith, Nick Pynn, Nick Samuel, Nick Smith, Nicky Newman, Nicky Spence, Nico Willems, Nicolas Moodie, Nigel Godrich, Nikk Hope, Nina Pankhaniya, Nitin Sawhney, Nubiyan Twist, Old Royal Naval College Trinity Laban Chapel Choir, ORA Singers, Otala, Owain Park, Own Klly, P. Robin White, Paddy Fletcher, Pam Wedgwood, Pat Alvarez, Patrick Jonsson, Patrizio Knight, Paul Cheneour, Paul Handley, Paul J Housden, Paul Johnson Rogers, Paul Leonard-Morgan, Paul Lewis, Paul Max Edlin, Paul McCartney, Paul O'Duffy, Paul Thompson, Paula Juden, Peggy Seeger, Pet Shop Boys, Pete Colorado, Pete Q. Harris, Peter Ashley, Peter Fallowell, Peter Hewitt, Peter Mayne, Peter Nardone, Peter Salem, Peter Wallevik, Phil Manzanera, Phil Thornton, Philip Heyman, Philip Sheppard, Phoebe Hutchason, Piers Maxim, Pigs Pigs Pigs Pigs Pigs Pigs Pigs, Police Dog Hogan, Poppy Ewence, Porridge Radio, Prairiez, Public Service Broadcasting, R. Betts, Rachael Drury, Rachael Philip, Rachael Pickering, Rachel Mahon, Rachel Portman, Rachel Roberts, Ray Cooper, Raz Olsher, Răzvan Kim, Rebecca Berkley, Rebecca Brown, Rebecca Hepplewhite, Rebecca Seale, Recordare, Redline, Revenge of Calculon, Rhiannon Mathias, Rich Cooper, Rich(ard) Dawson, Richard Allain, Richard G Mitchell, Richard Gowers, Richard Hudson, Richard Lowe, Richard McVeigh, Richard Pike, Richard Shakeshaft, Richard Warren, Riz Ahmed, Roary Skaista, Rob Lane, Rob Lord, Robbie Medina, Robert de Fresnes, Robert Fripp, Robert Green, Robert King, Robert Mingay Smith, Robert Mitchell, Robert Robertson, Robert Tucker, Robert Webb, Robin A Taylor-Firth, Robin Jax, Robin Kiel, Robin Schlochtermeier, Robyn Sellman, Roderick Williams, Rodolfus Choir, Roger Vignoles, Ross Gilmartin, Ross Morrow, Rowland Lee, Roy Babbington, Roy Kerr, Roy Moore, Royal Albert Hall, Royal Liverpool Philharmonic Orchestra, Rozzi, Rupert Gough, Ruth Barrett, Ryan Probert, Ryan Trebilcock, Sally Herbert, Sam Burt, Sam Cramer, Sam Dudley, Sam Fender, Sam Harper, Sam Hayes, Sam Klempner, Samuel Pegg, Samuel Sim, Sandy Nuttgens, Sara Foster, Sarah Blair, Sarah Connolly, Sarah Denbee, Sarah Playford, Sarah Warne, Scottish Session Orchestra, Scouting For Girls, Segun Akinola, Serge Sainte Rose, Seton Daunt, Shao Dow, Shean Bowers, SILVASTONE, Simon Carrington, Simon Elms, Simon Franglen, Simon Hewitt Jones, Simon Le Bon, Simon Lole, Simon Nathan, Simon Surtees, Simone Marie, Sion Trefor, Sissy Ford, SOHN, Sophie Kauer, Stay At Home Choir, Stephen Armstrong, Stephen Bullamore, Stephen Hough, Stephen Power, Stephen Shellard, Steve Luck, Steve Pretty, Steven Dodsworth, Stewart McIlwham, STORRY, Stuart Earl, Stuart Jackson, Stuart MacRae, Sue Quin, Sue Sutherley, Susan Bixley, Susanna Gray-Jones, Suvi-Eeva Äikäs, Suwuese Smith, Tamsin Waley-Cohen, Tara Creme, Tasmin Archer, Terl Bryant, The Anchoress, The Choir of Royal Holloway, The Choir of St. Bartholomew the Great, The Clash, The Flight, The Gesualdo Six, The Kanneh-Masons, The King's Singers, The Ligeti Quartet, The Sixteen, The Swingles, The Ugly Guys, The Vivum Singers, The Wellermen, Thee Alcoholics, Third Girl From the Left, This Is the Kit, Thomas Coldrick, Thomas Hewitt Jones, Thomas Richard Haslehurst, Tim Exile, Tim Gosden, Tim Knight, Tim Oliver, Tim Scott, Tim Seddon, Timothy Blinko, Toby Wheatley, Tom Bullard, Tom C. Cleary, Tom Grennan, Tom Rasmussen, Tom Stafford, Tony Valsamidis, Tony Volker, Tori Amos, Toyah Willcox, Travis, Trevor Heath, Tristan Hambleton, Uinya, Victor Ray, Victoria Ann-Louise Whittaker, Vincent Watts, Vinther, VOCES8, Walter Mair, Wayne Corrie Beecham, Will Mowat, Will Todd, William Morris, Willie Dowling, Yard Act, Yazz, YolanDa Brown, Yusuf / Cat Stevens, Zara Nunn, Zero 7	Co-Writers

== See also ==
- Sleepify by Vulfpeck, an entirely silent album
- 4'33", a John Cage composition which instructs the performers to remain silent
- Artificial intelligence in music
