= MusicDNA =

MusicDNA may refer to:

- MusicDNA (company), a Norwegian company
- MusicDNA (database), an online ontology describing the underlying structure of the events within musical history
- MusicDNA (file format), a downloadable music file format able to carry additional data, such as lyrics, video and cover art
