= Jerusalem-Yerushalayim =

Jerusalem-Yerushalayim is an oratorio composed by Antony Pitts between 2006-2008, and is scored for SATB soloists, semi-chorus, full chorus, and ensemble including harp, piano, and organ. The oratorio tells the Biblical story of Jerusalem and the text is based directly on the Old Testament. Unusually, it includes Hebrew transliterations of many names and places. It was first performed in a chamber version by TONUS PEREGRINUS as part of the Opera Fringe festival in Down Cathedral, Downpatrick in Northern Ireland on 8 June 2008. The North American premiere was given by Choral Arts Cleveland, conducted by Martin Kessler in May 2012.

The oratorio is in four parts of three movements each, plus a coda The Peace of Jerusalem which was premiered one year earlier in Israel by Jeremy Summerly and The Choir of London. The a cappella coda has also been recorded by TONUS PEREGRINUS on the Hyperion album Alpha and Omega. The world premiere recording of the complete revised version of the oratorio was made by TONUS PEREGRINUS, Londinium, Aldeburgh Young Musicians, and Tiffin Boys' Choir, under the direction of Joanna Forbes L'Estrange, Ben Parry, and the composer; it was released on 29 July 2013 by 1equalmusic and distributed by Hyperion.
