= Alexander L'Estrange =

English composer

Alexander Richard William L'Estrange (born 7 April 1974) is an English composer of choral music and music for television and an arranger for vocal ensembles. He is also a jazz musician (piano and double bass), choral workshop leader, presenter of children's concerts. He was a jazz examiner and trainer for ABRSM.

== Personal life ==
Born in Bristol, L'Estrange grew up in Oxford and attended New College School, where he was a member of New College Choir as chorister and soloist. He was then educated at Lord William's School, and then at the Royal Grammar School, High Wycombe. He read Music at Merton College, Oxford, gaining a First Class Honours Degree.

He is married to professional musician Joanna Forbes L'Estrange, with whom he has two sons, Toby and Harry.

== Works ==
=== Large-scale choral works ===
L'Estrange's flagship work Zimbe! Come sing the songs of Africa! (2008) established him as one of Britain's most popular living choral composers, receiving 150 performances worldwide within its first five years. Scored for SATB adult choir, unison children's choir and jazz quintet, the music is a fusion of African song and jazz. With the same scoring, Ahoy! Sing for the Mary Rose (2013) is a fusion of Tudor songs and sea shanties, commissioned to commemorate the opening of Portsmouth's state-of-the-art museum which houses the hull of King Henry VIII's warship, the Mary Rose. Zadok rules – hallelujah! (2013) was commissioned by the Hanover Band to celebrate sixty years since the coronation of Queen Elizabeth II.

Based on Handel's coronation anthems, the piece is scored for SATB adult choir, unison children's choir and Baroque orchestra and the text traces all of Britain's monarchs from William the Conqueror to Elizabeth II. Song Cycle – vive la vélorution! (2014) is a choral work comprising songs (both original and arranged) about cycling and the great outdoors, performed in York Minster at the opening of the Tour de France in 2014. His Wassail! Carols of Comfort and Joy, which won the Music Teachers Award for Best Classical Educational Initiative, was commissioned by the United Learning group and premiered in November 2017. The following year came his next large-scale works, this time in collaboration with his wife, Joanna Forbes L'Estrange. Freedom! The power of song (2018), commissioned by Salisbury Choral Society, was premiered by Salisbury Community Choir in November 2018. Other large-scale choral works include And the stones sing and Let all the world in every corner sing.

=== Small-scale choral works ===
Choral anthems with organ include Lute-book lullaby and Tune me, O Lord. In 2016 the professional chamber choir Tenebrae recorded an album of L'Estrange's sacred and jazz inspired choral works, called "On eagles' wings". Unaccompanied choral anthems include Love comes quietly, My song is love unknown, Oculi Omnium, Epiphany Carol (runner-up in the St Paul's Cathedral commission competition 2013) and Prayers for peace, three settings of the prayers God be in my head, Lighten our darkness and The Lord's prayer. Choral pieces suitable for children's choirs include Irish blessing, Go forth in peace and This is our world.

Most of L'Estrange's compositions are published by Faber Music. however since 2018 some of his more recent works have been self-published through his own record label Andagio.

=== Songs ===
L'Estrange's output as a songwriter includes three settings for solo voice and piano of poems by Shelley, Tennyson and Byron entitled Love's philosophy: She walks in beauty, Now sleeps the crimson petal and Love's philosophy are on the ABRSM singing syllabus. He has also written a one-woman musical, in collaboration with author Michelle Magorian, called Hello life! and several jazz originals recorded on the album New things to say by his jazz ensemble L'Estranges in the Night.

=== Arrangements ===
L'Estrange is consultant editor and chief arranger for the Choral Basics series, published by Faber Music. He has arranged for vocal ensembles including The Swingle Singers, The King's Singers, amarcord, Voces8 and Tenebrae. L'Estrange wrote all of the arrangements for and produced Great American Songbook, the album released in 2013 by The King's Singers.

=== Television ===
L'Estrange composed the theme tune and incidental music for the BBC's CBeebies programme Magic Hands (2012), recorded by his sons, Toby and Harry L'Estrange. He also writes for the production music company Audio Network with his music featuring on such television programmes as The One Show, Grand Designs and Antiques Roadshow.

== Chronological discography ==
Recordings of arrangements and original compositions by Alexander L'Estrange:

- Ticket to Ride (1999) – with a cappella vocal arrangements by Alexander L'Estrange of Beatles songs, recorded by The Swingle Singers, directed by Joanna Forbes L'Estrange. SWINGCD
- Mood Swings (2002) – with a cappella vocal jazz arrangements by Alexander L'Estrange, recorded by The Swingle Singers, directed by Joanna Forbes L'Estrange. SWINGCD
- Mother and Child (2003) – first recording of Alexander L'Estrange's Christmas anthem Lute-book lullaby, performed by Tenebrae, directed by Nigel Short. SIGNUM RECORDS
- Gibbons Hymns & Songs of the Church (2004) – arrangements of Gibbons and As now the sun's declining rays, an original hymn by Alexander L'Estrange, performed by Tonus Peregrinus, directed by Antony Pitts. NAXOS.
- Unwrapped (2004) – with arrangements by Alexander L'Estrange of Christmas songs recorded by The Swingle Singers, directed by Joanna Forbes L'Estrange. SWINGCD
- Blessed City (2009) – first recording of Alexander L'Estrange's anthem On Eagles' Wings, performed by The Choir of St David's Cathedral, directed by Alexander Mason. REGENT
- Sweet is the Memory (2009) – first recording of Alexander L'Estrange's Prayers for Peace, performed by Schola Cantorum of Oxford, directed by James Burton. FABER MUSIC
- Zimbe! Come sing the songs of Africa! by Alexander L'Estrange (2010) – featuring the Zimbe! singers, the Call Me Al Quintet (with Alexander L'Estrange on piano) and pupils of Haileybury College, conducted by Joanna Forbes L'Estrange. ANDAGIO 001
- Swimming over London (2010) – with a cappella vocal arrangements by Alexander L'Estrange, recorded by The King's Singers. SIGNUM RECORDS
- Songs of Cricket (2011) – with vocal arrangements by Alexander L'Estrange recorded by The London Quartet.
- Coming home for Christmas (2011) – with vocal arrangements by Alexander L'Estrange recorded by amarcord.
- New things to say – Songs of L'Estrange & Legrand (2012) – featuring songs by Alexander L'Estrange recorded and produced by L'Estranges in the Night. ANDAGIO 002
- Ahoy! Sing for the Mary Rose (2013) – featuring the Ahoy! Singers, the Call Me Al Quintet (with Alexander L'Estrange on piano) and pupils from schools in Guildford and Portsmouth, conducted by Joanna Forbes L'Estrange. ANDAGIO 003
- Let it snow (2013) – with arrangements by Alexander L'Estrange of Let it snow! recorded by The King's Singers and featuring oboist Albrecht Mayer.
- Folks and Tales (2013) –with 3 a cappella vocal arrangements by Alexander L'Estrange of Christmas songs from round the world, recorded by amarcord. APOLLON CLASSICS.
- Carols around the Christmas Tree (2013) – first recording of Alexander L'Estrange's Christmas carol Hodie!, recorded by Ely Cathedral Choir, directed by Paul Trepte. HERALD.
- Great American Songbook (2013) – featuring 17 vocal jazz arrangements by Alexander L'Estrange, recorded by The King's Singers
- Song Cycle – vive la vélorution! (2015) – Celebrating the Tour de France. Published by Faber Music.
- On Eagles' Wings (2016) – Sacred and jazz inspired choral works recorded by Tenebrae. Published by Faber Music
- Wassail! Carols of comfort and joy (2017) – Choral arrangements of traditional carols. Published by Faber Music.
- Freedom! The power of song (2018) – Marks four important historical landmarks in the struggle for freedom. Published by Andagio.
