= Wonderous Stories =

Song by the English progressive rock band Yes

- Cover

Single by Yes

from the album Going for the One
- B-side: "Parallels"
- Released: 2 September 1977
- Recorded: 1976–1977
- Studio: Mountain (Montreux, Switzerland)
- Genre: Progressive rock
- Length: 3:45
- Label: Atlantic
- Songwriter: Jon Anderson
- Producer: Yes

Yes singles chronology
"Soon (From "The Gates of Delirium")" (1975)	"Wonderous Stories" (1977)	"Going for the One" (1977)

"Wonderous Stories" is a song by the English progressive rock band Yes, released in September 1977 as the first single from their eighth studio album, Going for the One. It was written by lead vocalist Jon Anderson, who gained inspiration for the song one morning during his stay in Montreux, Switzerland where the band recorded the album. The song reached number seven on the UK singles chart and remains the band's highest-charting single in the country.

== Background ==
By October 1976, the Yes line-up of singer Jon Anderson, bassist Chris Squire, guitarist Steve Howe, drummer Alan White, and keyboardist Patrick Moraz had retreated to Mountain Studios in Montreux, Switzerland to record their eighth studio album, Going for the One (1977). The group had worked on a substantial number of new songs for the album, one of them being "Wonderous Stories" by Anderson, to which the group contributed ideas to develop them further. Early into the sessions, Moraz was asked to leave the band, something that he did not expect and later reasoned it down to the internal pressures of the group and ongoing issues that he was unaware of. His departure came after the group invited previous keyboardist Rick Wakeman, who had left in 1974, to play on the album. A demo tape containing early versions of "Wonderous Stories" and "Going for the One" was sent to Wakeman in England, who liked the direction the band were going with the songs and believed he could contribute to the music. He subsequently agreed to travel to Switzerland and rejoin the band. "Wonderous Stories" was produced collectively by the band, with John Timperley as their recording engineer and David Richards assisting.

== Music and lyrics ==
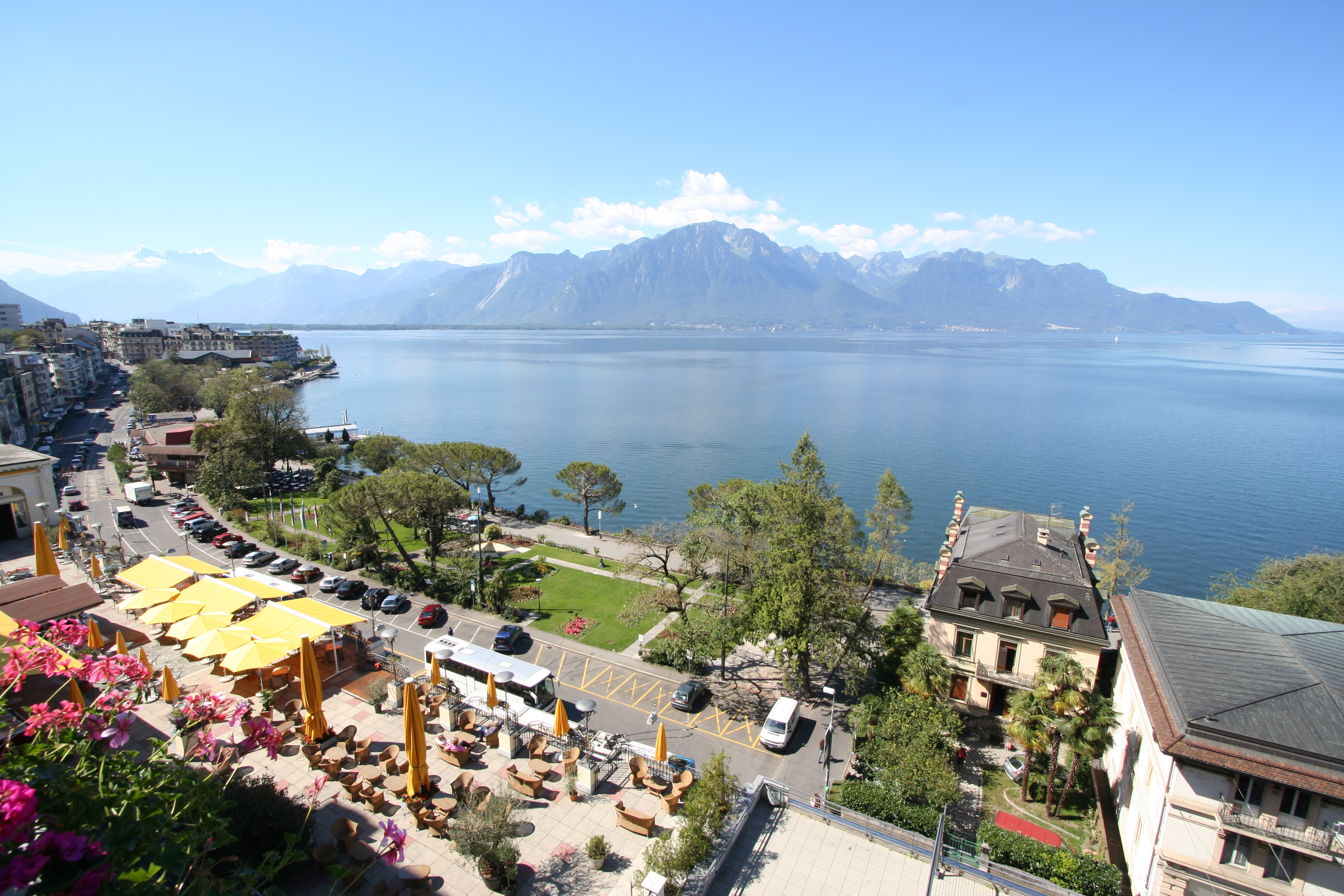
A view from Montreux, Switzerland where Anderson gained inspiration for the song.

"Wonderous Stories" is a ballad solely credited to Anderson. He wrote the song during "a beautiful day" while staying in Montreux, "one of those days you want to remember for years afterwards". It was then that the phrase "wonderous stories" entered his head, which he used in the lyrics. He noted that the song concerned the "the joys of life, as opposed to the uptightedness of some aspects of life", that was inspired by romantic stories and "a kind of dream sequence". Author Bill Martin believed the song is about the importance of hearing and listening.

Howe commented that Anderson wrote the song during "his Renaissance period" when he was into a "classical ... feeling to things" and noted its strong "classical framework". The song features Howe playing a 12-string Portuguese guitar, which he had used previously on "I've Seen All Good People", and an electric guitar which he plays during the conclusion. Wakeman plays the Polymoog, a polyphonic analogue synthesiser. White contributed the idea of the drums and bass playing on odd beats.

== Release ==
"Wonderous Stories" was released in 7-inch and 12-inch formats as the first of two singles from Going for the One, in September 1977. A limited edition in black and blue vinyl was also released and marketed as a Special Edition. The B-side contains the complete edit of "Parallels", a track written by Squire. In the US, "Wonderous Stories" was released with an edited version of "Awaken", also from Going for the One, as the B-side.

The single entered the UK singles chart at number 31, the week of 17 September 1977. After a four-week climb, it reached its peak of number seven for the week of 8 October to become the band's highest charting UK single; it remained on the chart for the next five weeks.

To promote the single, Yes produced a music video for the track, their first such production. It features the group playing the song in a live setting.

"Wonderous Stories" has been released in several Yes compilation albums and box sets. The song was performed acoustically for the first time during the band's 2004 tour in celebration of their 35th anniversary.

In 2006, the song was featured in a Cadillac DTS television commercial whereby a group of men in the car discuss whether many people listen to Yes. They ask a pair of women, to which one of them replies, "Yeah, it's classic rock".

== Reception ==
The song has been considered as Yes's "pop moment" and a marked departure from the less accessible approach of their previous two albums, which broadened their audience as a result. In a retrospective review for AllMusic, Ross Boissoneau thought the song, along with "Turn of the Century", a track from Going for the One, were "lovely ballads the way only Yes can do them". Critic and author Martin Popoff also praised the song, calling it "perhaps the most beautiful Yes composition of the quiet sort, an angelic acoustic bit of frolic, whose deceptive, simple arrangement bears many hard-won treasures". Critic and band biographer Chris Welch described "Wonderous Stories" as a "fortuitous" tune, "relaxed and melodic" that makes the group "fly without really trying". Author Bill Martin picked Anderson and Squire's harmony vocals as a highlight of the song. Cash Box said that "the melodies spun by Jon Anderson's clear, soaring voice are irresistible, while all the instrumental parts, especially Chris Squire's tasteful bass lines, anchor the sound for solid rock appeal."

Yes keyboardist Geoff Downes rated the track as one of Yes's "hidden gems", and bassist Billy Sherwood has ranked it as one of his favourites from the band.

== Credits and personnel ==
Yes

- Jon Anderson – lead vocals
- Steve Howe – Portuguese and electric guitar, vocals
- Chris Squire – bass guitar, vocals
- Rick Wakeman – Polymoog synthesizer
- Alan White – drums, percussion

Production

- Yes – production
- John Timperley – recording engineer
- David Richards – assistant recording engineer

== Charts ==
Chart (1977)	Peak position
Ireland (IRMA)	6
UK Singles (Official Charts)	7
