= John Drinkwater =

John Drinkwater is the name of:

- John Drinkwater Bethune (1762–1844), English officer and military historian
- John Drinkwater (playwright) (1882–1937), English poet and dramatist
- John Elliot Drinkwater Bethune (1801–1851), pioneer in women's education in India
- John Drinkwater (composer) (born 1957), English composer and technologist
