= Seven Letters (Tonus Peregrinus album) =

Studio album by Tonus Peregrinus
- Released: June 2005
- Recorded: September 2000
- Genre: Choral
- Length: 1:01:25
- Label: Hyperion Records
- Producer: Martin Cotton

Tonus Peregrinus chronology
Seven Letters (2005)	Alpha and Omega (2008)

Seven Letters is Tonus Peregrinus's first album of unaccompanied choral works by Antony Pitts released on Hyperion Records. The album contains the only-known complete setting of the seven letters from the Book of Revelation. Tracks from the album have been broadcast on BBC Radio 3, and the opening work Adoro Te was sung at the memorial for Alexander Litvinenko in 2006.
