= Passio (Pärt) =

1982 musical composition by Arvo Pärt

- Passion by Arvo Pärt
- Album cover
- Style: tintinnabuli
- Text: Gospel of John
- Language: Latin
- Composed: 1982
- Scoring: SATB soloists and choir, oboe, bassoon, violin, cello, organ

Passio Domini Nostri Jesu Christi secundum Joannem (The Passion of Our Lord Jesus Christ According to John), also known as the St. John Passion or simply Passio, is a passion setting by Arvo Pärt for solo bass (Jesus), solo tenor (Pilate), solo vocal quartet (Evangelist), choir, violin, oboe, cello, bassoon and organ. The work lasts approximately 70 minutes and is a setting of the Latin text from the Gospel of John, chapters 18 and 19, plus a brief introduction and conclusion.

== History ==
When Pärt left Estonia for Austria in 1980, he took with him the first sketches for the St. John Passion, which would become the culmination of the tintinnabuli style. He eventually finished the work in 1982 and it was published in 1989. Since then, it has been recorded four times, and remains one of his most popular works. In much the same way that Pärt was inspired by medieval music in his creation of tintinnabuli, here too he is inspired by the earliest monophonic settings of the Passion. The St. John Passion is a through-composed setting of the text of John 18–19, preceded by a short introduction (Exordio) and followed by a brief conclusion (Conclusio). He uses a bass soloist for Jesus, a tenor for Pilate, and a Soprano-Alto-Tenor-Bass (SATB) quartet for the evangelist. In addition, there are four solo instruments, oboe, violin, cello and bassoon, organ and SATB choir. The work lasts about 70 minutes and is not broken into movements.

== Structure ==
In composing the work, text setting and declamation were foremost in Pärt's mind: all of the musical elements in the piece, from rhythm to pitch, are in some way determined by the text. Tonally, the work centers on a series of overlapping fifths: D-A-E-B. The rhythmic values are established by the text. Each character has a basic note value, and this is lengthened depending on the punctuation and its position within the phrase. Since a period at the end of a sentence generates a note longer than does a comma in the middle of it, the hierarchy of the textual phrases is reflected in the music.

Value assignment:

1. In the last word of a phrase ending with a comma, the stressed syllable would be medium.
2. In the last word of a phrase ending with a colon or period, each syllable would be long.
3. In the first word of a new sentence (or phrase beginning after a colon), the stressed syllable would be medium.
4. In the last word in a phrase ending with a question mark, each syllable would be medium.
5. Otherwise all syllables are short.

Pärt divides the Evangelist text into four sections (50 phrases each), plus a final concluding section of 10 phrases, for a total of 210. Each section begins with a different solo voice, an instrument then joins it, and this pattern continues until all 8 are sounding. The alto and bass voices and oboe and bassoon are always M-voices (Hillier's coinage, referring to the melody voice in a tintinnabuli configuration); the soprano and tenor voices and violin and cello are always T-voices (again, Hillier's coinage referring to the harmonizing voice). In the case where a T-voice is presented alone, the M-voice is simply implied.

Christ always has the longest and lowest notes, creating a stark contrast with the other characters. The pitch center for Christ is E, and it is accompanied by a drone and T-voice in the organ. For the turba, the pitch center is again E. The alto and bass voices, again always playing an M role, are mirrored, and the soprano and tenor T-voices alternate above and below the M-voices. While both are centered on E, the M-voices use E Phrygian against E major in the T-voices; this makes for striking cross-relations between G-natural and G-sharp, though the two never sound at the same time. Pilate, like Christ, is accompanied only by the organ, but sings in faster rhythmic values and has a higher tessitura. Pilate's part is the most unstable in the piece, created in part through the use of an M-voice centered on B and a T-voice centered on F (a tritone apart) and through the refusal of Pilate to be either a T-voice or M-voice, always alternating between these two roles.

== Reception ==
American composer Eric Whitacre used the two initial chords of the conclusion (Qui passus es) in his motet Lux Aurumque, applying them to the words natum (new-born) and thus linking birth and death of Christ to reincarnation.

== Recordings ==
- Paul Hillier, dir., Passio, by Arvo Pärt, Hilliard Ensemble, ECM New Series 837109 (1988).
- Tauno Satomaa, dir., Johannes Passion, by Arvo Pärt, Candomino Choir, Finlandia Records (2001).
- Antony Pitts, dir., Passio, by Arvo Pärt, Tonus Peregrinus, Naxos 8555860 (2003).
- Nils Schweckendiek, dir., Passio, by Arvo Pärt, Helsinki Chamber Choir, BIS BIS-2612 SACD (2021).
