= Piano six hands =

Music for three pianists at one piano

Music described as piano six hands is for three pianists at one piano. More rarely the neologism 'Triet' is used, by analogy with the duo/duet distinction sometimes made between two pianos and piano four hands (and also because piano trio is an already established term). Because of the limited range available to each player, many of the pieces written for this combination are elementary in nature; many more are arrangements of pieces for other forces. But there are a small number of original works, and a handful of virtuoso three-player groups have emerged in the 21st century.

== Examples ==
Compositions include five pieces by Percy Grainger, Sergei Rachmaninoff's Romance and Valse, Alfred Schnittke's Hommage, Carl Czerny's opp. 17, 84, 227–229, 295–298, 609, 689, 741 and 798, Jean Cras's "Âmes d’enfants", Cornelius Gurlitt's six Tonstücke, Op. 192, Paul Robinson's "Pensees" and "Montmartre", various pieces by German composer Armin Fuchs, Bulgarian composer Tomislav Baynov's "Metrorhythmia 1", John Pitts's "Are You Going?", Greek composer Dionysis Boukouvalas's "Fantasy on a theme by Steve Reich", Canadian composer Paul Frehner's "Slowdown", Malaysian composer Samuel Cho's "S[wim]", Italian composer Fabio Mengozzi's "Promenade".

== Performing groups ==
- AXA: One Piano, Six Hands
- ATM Triet
- Severnside Composers Alliance
- Trio Philagrande
- Trio Pianistico di Bologna
