= The Mountains Shall Bring Peace =

The Mountains Shall Bring Peace may refer to:

- Words from Psalm 72, verse 3, of the Bible
- A 1947 pamphlet by Robert Lock Graham Irving
- A 2023 choral work composed by Joanna Forbes L'Estrange
