= John Pitts (composer) =

British composer (born 1976)

John Pitts (sometimes credited as John Michael Pitts) is a British composer, born in Surrey in 1976.

Pitts studied music at Bristol and Manchester Universities, and specialises in music for piano solo or multiple hands. He was winner of the Philharmonia Orchestra Martin Musical Scholarship Fund Composition Prize 2003, and twice SPNM-shortlisted. Composer of the album of piano music "Intensely Pleasant Music: 7 Airs & Fantasias and other piano music". His setting of O Little Town of Bethlehem features on The Naxos Book of Carols sung by Tonus Peregrinus, and his hymn Thy Way, Not Mine is included in Hymns and Songs of the Church, another Naxos recording of Tonus Peregrinus. Composer of "Are You Going?" for piano six hands, Pitts curated two Severnside Composers Alliance concerts of music for piano triet by living composers. He is the younger brother of the British composer Antony Pitts.
