= Sam and the Womp =

British pop group

- Origin: United Kingdom
- Genres: House; electro swing; pop
- Years active: 2009–present
- Labels: Stiff; One More Tune (Warner); Womp Record's
- Members: Bloem de Ligny; Sam Ritchie
- Past members: Aaron Audio
- Website: samandthewomp.com

Sam and the Womp are a British pop group consisting of trumpeter Sam Ritchie and Dutch-born vocalist Bloem de Ligny, also known as Lady Oo. The band's music mixes traditional elements of Balkan music with modern dub and drum 'n' bass elements. From its formation in 2009 to 2014, the band also included producer Aaron "Audio" Horn, the son of musician and producer Trevor Horn.

The group's debut single "Bom Bom" was released as a digital download on 19 August 2012, and hit number one on the UK Singles Chart. It has sold over a million copies worldwide. In 2012, they signed to Stiff Records and One More Tune.

WOMP Records are trying to create a Vol 2 as well as a Double CD package Featuring Sam.

== Music career ==
=== 2009–2013: Formation and "Bom Bom" ===
Sam and the Womp was formed in September 2009 when Ritchie and de Ligny's band QDOS joined forces with Horn.

Initially signed to Stiff Records, Sam and the Womp released "Bom Bom" under a licensing deal with One More Tune on 20 August 2012. The track gained further momentum after being used to soundtrack an international TV advertising campaign for Southern Comfort. Les Mills uses it for their biceps workout track in Body Pump. The song is also included in the video games Forza Horizon and The Sims 3: Island Paradise, and was featured on the Channel 4 TV show Big Fat Gypsy Weddings and in an episode of the CBS TV program Elementary. Kmart Australia also featured the song in their 2013 series of TV commercials. The song has also been used in a series of Canadian TV commercials for the Joe Fresh line of clothing. The track went to number one on the UK Singles Chart in its first week of release.

"Bom Bom" was produced by Horn, Ritchie and music producer and film composer Raz Olsher, at Fossil Studios in Hackney, London. The song was written by Horn, Ritchie, de Ligny and Olsher.

=== 2014–present ===
Horn left the group in 2014, and Ritchie and de Ligny continued as a duo.

Ritchie and de Ligny co-founded Womp Records Ltd. in 2015.

On 15 January 2018, the band's debut EP, Womp Records, Vol. 1 was released. On 1 May 2018, Sam and the Womp released the single "Posh Ragga", which features MC Solomon. This was the lead single from the band's second EP Bee Sides, which was released on 18 May 2018. "Ice Cream Man" was released later in the year.

In 2021, they released the single "Sun Dance" with fellow British rapper K.O.G.

== Members ==
=== Current ===
- Sam Ritchie – trumpet (2009–present)
- Bloem de Ligny – vocals (2009–present)

=== Former ===
- Aaron Horn – co-founder, producer, writer (2009–2014)

== Discography ==
=== EPs ===
List of EPs, with selected details
Title	Details
Womp Records, Vol. 1	Released: 15 January 2018; Label: Womp; Format: Digital download
Bee Sides	Released: 18 May 2018; Label: Womp; Format: Digital download

=== Singles ===
List of singles, with selected chart positions and certifications
Year	Title	Peak chart positions						Certifications	Album
Year	Title	UK	AUS	FIN	IRE	NL	SCO	Certifications	Album
2012	"Bom Bom"	1	4	14	6	44	1	BPI: Gold; AUS: 4× Platinum	—N/a
2013	"Ravo"	—	—	—	—	—	—		—N/a
2015	"Zeppelin"	—	—	—	—	—	—		—N/a
2016	"Fireflies"	—	—	—	—	—	—		—N/a
2016	"East Meets West"	—	—	—	—	—	—		—N/a
2017	"Gypsy in the Snow"	—	—	—	—	—	—		—N/a
2018	"Posh Ragga"	—	—	—	—	—	—		Bee Sides
2018	"Ice Cream Man"	—	—	—	—	—	—		—N/a
