= Eivind Brydøy =

Norwegian Artist manager and businessman (born 1964)

- Born: 1964 (age 61–62); Steinkjer, Norway
- Other names: Eivind Brydoy
- Occupations: Record executive, Artist manager
- Known for: Manager for Nordic Artists

Eivind Brydøy (born 1964) is a Norwegian Artist manager and businessman. He has been vice Chairman for IMMF (International Music Managers Forum) and has had several positions in Norway such as the Control committee for Norgesnettet (Norwegian governmental Sound and light sponsoring for venues), Festivalcommittee /Rikskonsertene, Cultural Export Committee for the minister of Culture. He is still active in the MMF Norway and is often a speaker at music-conferences.

He graduated from the Norwegian School of Economics with a degree in Economics and Business Administration, Brydoy then joined Stageway. Four years later he started the booking agency Artistpartner with Svein Jacob Bye. He was active in the start of Di derres career on the album «Jenter & sånn» (triple platinum record). At this time he also worked with the artist Anne Grete Preus and the «Millimeter» record and tour (platinum record). He then worked with Bertine Zetlitz and her United States release on Nettwerk plus her activities in Norway. He has worked with the soul artist Noora Noor, who is still on his roster.

After selling his shares in Artistpartner Brydoy has worked with Kaizers Orchestra from their first album «Ompa til du dør» (double platinum record), which he still manages. He has been active in all foreign releases of Kaizers Orchestra from their first performances at Roskildefestival in Denmark and Eurosonic in the Netherlands to signing with Universal Germany. He also has been working with Noora Noor, Animal Alpha, The Grand and Bel Canto. He sits on the board of Bach Technology Gmbh .

One of his interests has been the use of computers in the music industry and the digital development. Some part of Brydoys work has been with the aggregator company Artspages until the merge with Phonofile. Brydoy is also a regular guest-teacher in Music Management at Høgskolen i Hedmark, Rena.

Brydoy is married to manager Katherine DePaul.
