= Cantabile (group) =

British a cappella vocal quartet

Cantabile - The London Quartet
- Origin: London, England
- Genres: A cappella, musical theatre, classical, film, television
- Labels: Signum Records, Champs Hill Records, TLQ Records, Spare Parts
- Website: www.thelondonquartet.com

Cantabile - The London Quartet is a British a cappella vocal quartet.

== History ==
They were formed as a student group whilst studying at Cambridge University in 1977. Initially their influences were The King’s Singers and The Songs of Yale, but they soon developed their own unique style of musical comedy. They turned professional in 1982 shortly before appearing in Blondel, which ran for 399 performances in London’s West End.

Even at their outset, they were more associated with the Cambridge Footlights than the chapel choirs, and theatricality and humour have always been a great part of their appeal. They won a Wavendon Allmusic Award from John Dankworth and Cleo Laine for breaking down the barriers between musical genres.

== Activities ==
The group is known in many territories as The London Quartet. Their touring schedule takes them to Europe, North America and the Far East, and sometimes further afield.

When Cantabile first visited Austria in the late 1970s, they were compared to German vocal group from the 1930s, The Comedian Harmonists.

In the UK, they have appeared in many theatres and concert halls, on BBC1, BBC2, ITV1, Channel 4, S4C and Channel 5 and on BBC Radios 1, 2, 3, 4, 5 and 4extra, BBC Radio London, and Classic FM. They were the resident vocal group on BBC Radio Two series Kenneth Williams Cabaret in the 1980s. They had a BBC Radio 2 series accompanied by the BBC Big Band, conducted by Barry Forgie, entitled Cantabile sing, The Big Band Swing in the 1990s, playing music by George Gershwin, Harry Warren, Duke Ellington, Billy Strayhorn and Rodgers and Hart.

They were long associated with Tim Rice, and appeared as the Consuls in Embassy Lament in Chess in Concert at the Royal Albert Hall May 12–13, 2008, alongside Josh Groban, Idina Menzel, Kerry Ellis, Adam Pascal and Marti Pellow.

On May 9, 2010 they celebrated, together with Simon Callow, the life and music of their late friend Stephen Oliver, who would have been 60 that year. This specially devised programme included excerpts from the RSC's production of Nicholas Nickleby (for which Oliver composed the original music) performed by Simon Callow, the London Mozart Players conducted by Nicholas Cleobury, and Cantabile. The evening also featured songs from the Rice-Oliver musical Blondel, settings of Shakespearian lyrics, and Stephen's mini-opera 'A Man of Feeling' and culminated in the entire audience and the Festival Choir, led by Simon Callow and Nicholas Cleobury, singing the rousing Patriotic Song from Nicholas Nickleby.

In 2014 they helped in the celebrations of the 300th anniversary of the Hanoverian Kings at the grand opening in Hanover of Als die Royals aus Hannover kamen, singing amongst other things, instructions in German set to the National Anthem as to how to make tea successfully ("God Save our Tea"), the Lambeth Walk backwards and The Four Georges from Horrible Histories.

The group have recorded many albums including:

- Music of the Night (1987) - all arrangements by Andrew Lloyd Webber's arranger, David Cullen
- A Tribute to Hollywood (1992) Producer: John Timperley
- Madrigal to McCartney (1995)
- Cantabile - Live in Cape Town! (1996) with Nigel Cook, piano
- Cantabile... on the tracks of The Comedian Harmonists (1999) with Malcolm Martineau, piano
- Christmas with Cantabile (2004)
- Lullabyes and Goodbyes (2005) Signum CD with Malcolm Martineau, piano. Producer: Adrian Peacock
- Songs of Cricket (2011) Signum CD, with guests Rory Bremner, Tim Rice, Richard Stilgoe, Alexander L'Estrange, Eliza Lumley soprano and Chris Hatt, piano. Producer: Nigel Short; Research and Mentor: David Rayvern Allen
- Songs of Love and War (2014) Champs Hill CD with Malcolm Martineau, piano
- A Song for Christmas (2017) Champs Hill CD with Chris Hatt, piano

The group have worked with many pianists; their current first choice is Chris Hatt, who is Associate Musical Director in London of the Broadway/West End musical Hamilton.

== Members ==
- William Purefoy (counter-tenor):1991-3, 2018-
- Christopher O'Gorman (tenor): 2015-
- Mark Fleming (tenor): 1991-
- Michael Steffan (baritone): 1977-

== Past members ==
- Richard Bryan (counter-tenor):1977-1991, 1997-2015
- Stewart Collins (tenor): 1977-1991
- Nicholas Ibbotson (tenor): 1977-1987
- Paul Hull (tenor): 1987-1999
- Morgan Crowley (counter-tenor): 1993-1997
- Steve Trowell (tenor): 1999-2001
- Jeremy Budd (tenor): 2001-2003
- Robin Green (tenor): 2003-2005
- Steven Brooks (tenor): 2005-2015
- Sarah-Ann Cromwell (soprano): 2015-2017
