= Bloem de Ligny =

Dutch singer-songwriter, producer, visual artist and musician

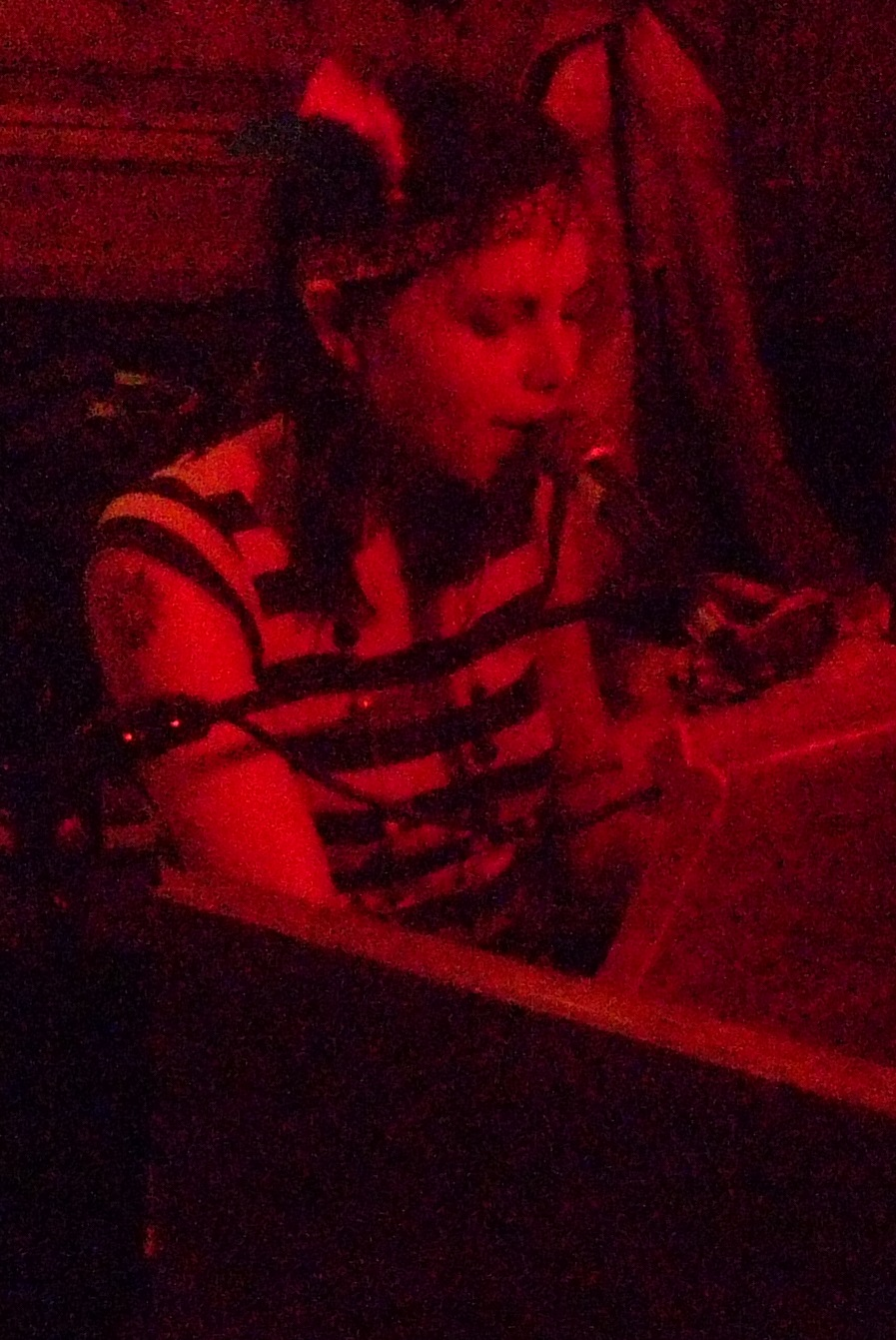
- Bloem de Wilde de Ligny performing in 2010

Background information
- Born: 7 July 1978 (age 47); Apeldoorn, Netherlands
- Genres: Dance; electronic
- Instruments: Vocals; keyboards; guitar
- Years active: 1996–present
- Labels: Sony France, Columbia, Virgin Belgium, Polichinelle, Lek, Dream Society

Bloem de Wilde de Ligny (born 7 July 1978) is a Dutch singer-songwriter, producer, visual artist and musician based in the United Kingdom. de Ligny has released music as a solo artist and as a member of various bands, including Fono & Serafina, Polichinelle, 4Fists, and Sam and the Womp. Her image and vocal style have often been compared to Björk. She has also performed under the names Bloem, Bloem de Wilde de Ligny, Serafina Ouistiti, Oo is an Instrument, Lady Oo, Bloom and most recently Bloom de Wilde.

== Early years ==
Bloem (meaning 'flower' in Dutch) de Wilde de Ligny was born to a Dutch-Indonesian father and a Dutch mother. Her father orchestrated in gamelan. They moved location twenty times before settling in Haarlem. After leaving school, she moved into a squat, and from 1996 began performing music under the name Bloem, appearing on the festival circuit with appearances at the Oerol, Lowlands and Crossing Border festivals.

== Zink ==
de Ligny's festival performances brought her to the attention of the record company Columbia. In November 1998, under the name Bloem de Ligny, the album Zink was released, produced by Tricky associate and ex-Boomtown Rats guitarist Pete Briquette, with contributions from musician Maarten Veldhuis, and recorded at the Townhouse Studios in London. The album's name derives from de Ligny's name for her own fantasy sea.

The record company had high expectations, and the album generally received positive reviews, with many comparing her vocal style to that of Icelandic artist Björk, although de Ligny cites Robert Wyatt as being a bigger influence. The single "Fingiecrookie" was released from the album and the accompanying music video received airplay on a number of music TV channels, but album sales disappointed and she parted company with the record label. de Ligny later moved to Paris for several months, and in the beginning of 2000 studied fine art in Rotterdam.

== Later work ==
In 2002, de Ligny made a guest appearance on the album We Should Have Been Stars by the band Mist. She collaborated with the band again for their 2008 album Period.

Also in 2002, with Ties van der Linden, she formed the ambient pop band Fono and Serafina. Their only album, Bathtub, was released in 2006. Around this time, de Ligny began performing under the stage name Serafina Ouistiti and subsequently attended the Willem de Kooning Academy of Fine Arts in Rotterdam, graduating in 2007. In 2005, she formed the band Polichinelle with the artist Bubu. They performed at the Glastonbury Festival in 2007.

In 2007, de Ligny co-founded, with Bubu and artist Kai Nobuko, the surrealist art collective Dream Society, producing animations, songs, films, and art installations based on sounds and images from "everyday life". de Ligny performs with the Society under the name Oo is an Instrument. Residing in London since 2003, she was involved in the founding of Gattoblaster Records, She has performed in the bands 4Fists and QDOS vs. Audio

In 2009, de Ligny joined Sam and the Womp as the vocalist and in 2012, their debut single "Bom Bom" went to number one in the UK.

The band released their second single 'Ravo' in 2013.

In 2014, de Ligny launched her new solo project Bloom and released her first single under that name, "Animal Spirit", which was followed by "Pale Moon Golden Light" the same year and "The World For You" in 2015.

In 2015, de Ligny founded Womp Records Ltd with Sam and the Womp bandmate Sam Ritchie to release the band's single 'Zeppelin'.

Kaleidophone, de Ligny's second studio album and first since Zink, was released in 2019.

== Personal life ==
de Ligny has synesthesia. She became a mother in 2013.

== Solo discography ==
=== Albums ===
==== Studio albums ====
===== As Bloem de Ligny =====
Year	Title	Label
1998	Zink	Sony France/Columbia

===== As Bloom de Wilde =====
Year	Title
2019	Kaleidophone

==== Live albums ====
===== As Bloem de Ligny =====
Year	Title	Label	Source
1999	Bloem Ongeplukt	Polichinelle	
2001	Bloemleg	Lek	

=== EPs ===
==== As Oo is an Instrument ====
Year	Title	Label	Source
2011	The Song, The Ship	Dream Society	

=== Singles ===
==== As Bloem ====
Year	Title	Album	Label	Source
1997	"Pink Serenity"	De Zevende Dag - Live 2	Virgin Belgium	

==== As Bloem de Ligny ====
Year	Title	Album	Notes	Source
1998	"Cells"	Zink and Nieuw Nederlands Peil 7 (Noorderslag)	Promotional single	
1998	"Fingiecrookie" (Masthaz of Funk Remixes)	Zink		
1999	"Fingiecrookie"	Zink		

==== As Bloom ====
Year	Title
2014	"Animal Spirit"
2014	"Pale Moon Golden Light"
2015	"The World For You"

==== As Bloom de Wilde ====
Year	Title	Album
2019	"Soul Siren"	Kaleidophone
