= Katherine DePaul =

Katherine Lynn DePaul
- Born: Lansdale, Pennsylvania
- Other names: Katherine DePaul
- Occupations: Record executive, Artist manager
- Known for: Founding partner for Artist Vision

Katherine Lynn DePaul is an American talent manager, born in Lansdale, Pennsylvania. DePaul is married to manager Eivind Brydøy. Together they formed the Norway/New York-based managing company, Artist Vision. She has been working with Judy Collins since 1993. In 1999, she set up Wildflower Records with Judy Collins and has been managing director for the company until today. She has produced the TV concert of Judy Collins and guests at the Metropolitan Museum of Art shown on PBS Autumn 2012. This special television program was nominated for a New York Emmy and won a bronze medal at the 2013 New York Festival International Television & Film. She was the executive producer of the Judy Collins concert in September 2013 at Dromoland Castle, Ireland aired on PBS Spring 2014. DePaul was producer and executive producer of the album Silver Skies Blue by Ari Hest & Judy Collins which was nominated for a Grammy in the Best Folk Album category in 2017. Also in 2017, Artist Vision brought together for the first time in 50 years, folk7.

DePaul holds a bachelor's degree from Fordham University.
