= Century Plaza Towers =

571-foot twin towers in the Century City neighborhood of Los Angeles, California

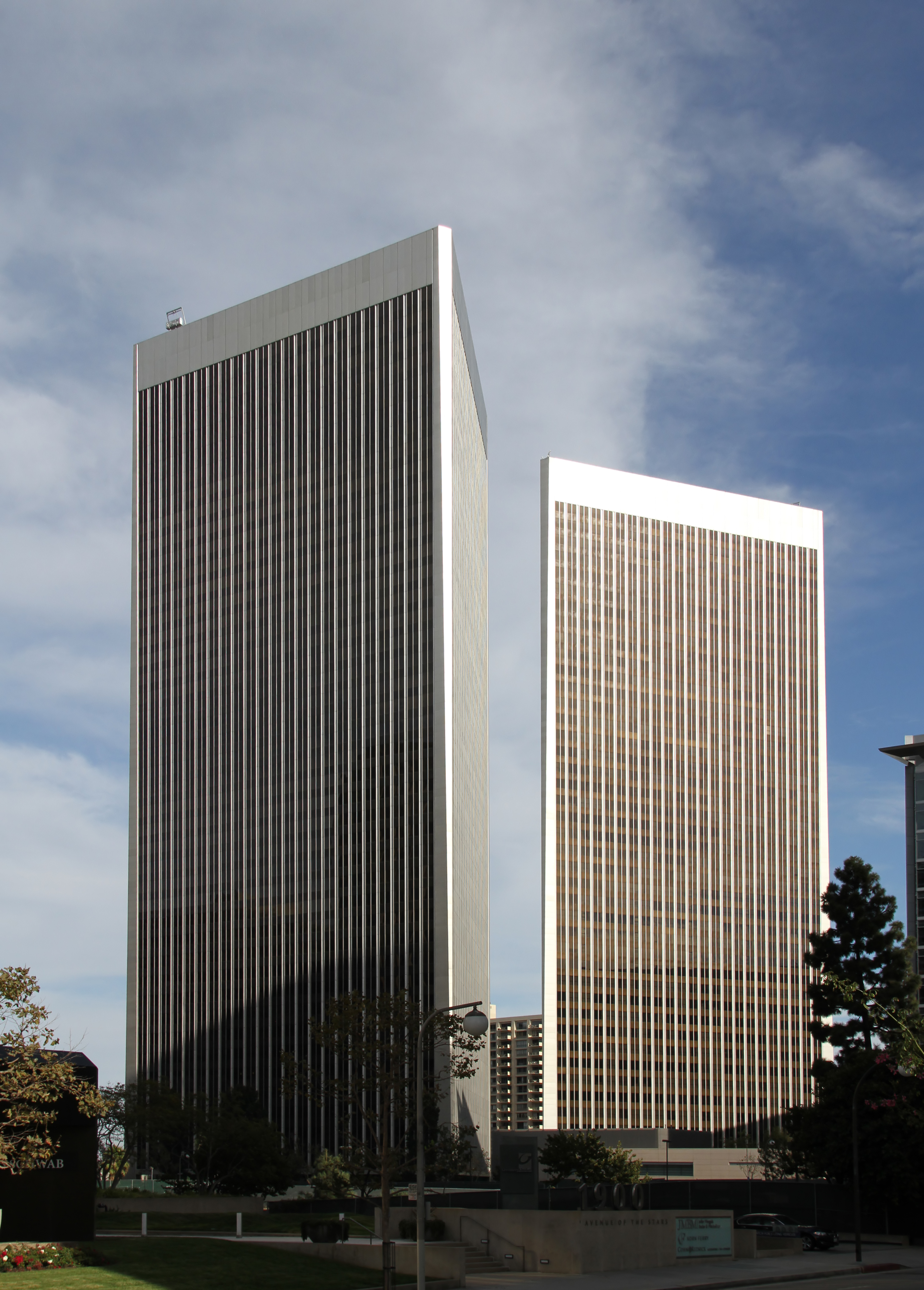
- Interactive map of the Century Plaza Towers area

General information
- Type: Commercial offices
- Location: 2029 and 2049 Century Park East; Los Angeles, California
- Coordinates: 34.05865°N 118.41411°W
- Construction started: April 1972
- Completed: 1975
- Operator: CBRE

Height
- Roof: 571.0 ft (174.04 m)

Technical details
- Floor count: 44
- Floor area: 2,300,000 sq ft (210,000 m^{2})
- Lifts/elevators: 26 (each)

Design and construction
- Architect: Minoru Yamasaki
- Developer: Trammell Crow Company

Website
- centurypark.net

The Century Plaza Towers are two 44-story, 571-foot (174 m) twin towers in the Century City neighborhood of Los Angeles, California. They are the tallest buildings in California outside Downtown Los Angeles and San Francisco.

Commissioned by Alcoa, the towers were designed by Minoru Yamasaki and completed in 1975. The towers resemble Yamasaki's iconic work, the original World Trade Center in New York City, with their twin configuration, vertical black and gray lines, and aluminum exteriors. The towers have an unusual triangular footprint and are landmarks that are clearly seen around the Los Angeles Westside. Their prominence in the Century City skyline has been reduced in recent years with the addition of new skyscrapers that partially block their view. Nevertheless, the Century Plaza Towers remain the tallest buildings in Century City and the tallest skyscrapers in Southern California outside of downtown Los Angeles. The towers sit atop one of the world's largest underground parking garages with a capacity of roughly 5,000 cars.

The Los Angeles Times reported that in February 2020, the signature twin office skyscrapers were fully occupied for the first time.

== In popular culture ==
In television, the towers were the location for the offices of two separate fictional 1980s private detectives. Remington Steele, the main character of the eponymous NBC series, which ran from 1982 to 1987 and the Blue Moon Detective Agency on the ABC series Moonlighting, which ran from 1985 to 1989, both had their offices in the complex. Nearly every episode of Remington Steele included an exterior establishing shot of the towers, while they are seen in the opening credits of Moonlighting. Many episodes of the previously FOX series turned ABC, 9-1-1 includes the towers as b-roll in-between scenes.

The towers have also served as the backdrop for several television commercials, including adverts for Samsung, Buick, Volvo, and Kia Motors. In film, the towers were featured in 1988's Die Hard (shown at the end credits), 1990's Death Warrant, and 2011's The Green Hornet. They were also used as opening and establishing shots for the CBS series Family Law starring Oscar-nominated actress Kathleen Quinlan.

The base of the towers stood in for the Yamasaki-designed World Trade Center in the 1981 film Escape from New York starring Kurt Russell.

The buildings were also used in Melrose Place as the office of Lexi Sterling's business, Sterling Advertising. They were also seen in Burke's Law.

The buildings were used for the album cover of Yes’s 1977 album Going for the One. In 1979, Olivia Newton-John filmed the music video for the title track of her album Totally Hot here. The buildings are prominently featured in Public Image Ltd's 1983 video for This Is Not a Love Song. In 1981, the buildings were used in a bumper of the silver ball logo for Nickelodeon. The buildings were shown under construction in a 1974 episode of Barnaby Jones entitled "Dark Legacy".

In the 1990 TV movie, The Great Los Angeles Earthquake, during 8.0 and 7.2 magnitude earthquakes both buildings sway violently, afterwards both buildings remain standing but are severely damaged.

The construction site was used for the 1972 Columbo episode "Blueprint for Murder."

== See also ==
- List of tallest buildings in Los Angeles
