= Going for the One =

1977 studio album by Yes

Studio album by Yes
- Released: 12 July 1977
- Recorded: October 1976–April 1977
- Studios: Mountain, Montreux, Switzerland
- Genre: Progressive rock
- Length: 38:43
- Label: Atlantic
- Producer: Yes

Yes chronology
Yesterdays (1975)	Going for the One (1977)	Tormato (1978)

Singles from Going for the One
- 1. "Wonderous Stories" Released: 2 September 1977; 2. "Going for the One" Released: 18 November 1977

Going for the One is the eighth studio album by the English progressive rock band Yes, released on 12 July 1977 by Atlantic Records. After taking an extended break in activity in 1975 for each member to record and release a solo album, and completing their subsequent 1976 tour, the band members became tax exiles and relocated to Montreux, Switzerland, to record their next studio album at Mountain Studios. During the early writing and rehearsal stages, keyboardist Patrick Moraz was dismissed from the group following creative and psychological pressures. This marked the return of former keyboardist Rick Wakeman, who had left Yes in 1974 to pursue a solo career after differences surrounding the band's ambitious concept double album Tales from Topographic Oceans (1973).

The album represents a major shift in the band's musical and aesthetic style. In a departure from the extended or conceptual tracks that dominated their previous four studio albums, Going for the One features shorter, more direct, and accessible songs written primarily by Jon Anderson, Steve Howe, and Chris Squire, with the exception of the fifteen-minute closing track "Awaken". The album was solely produced by the band themselves, marking a formal split from their longtime producer and engineer Eddy Offord alongside the hiring of a new engineering team. It also marked the end of their long-standing collaboration with cover artist Roger Dean, as the band commissioned Hipgnosis to create a stark, geometric design. Musically, the record introduces unique instrumentation, including Howe's use of a vachalia and pedal steel guitar work, Wakeman's use of a Polymoog synthesiser, and a church organ recorded via a telephone line from nearby Vevey.

Going for the One received a positive response from music critics, who welcomed the band's energetic return to more melodic simplicity, though the stark design of the Hipgnosis sleeve drew mixed retrospective commentary. It was a major commercial success, reaching number one on the UK Albums Chart for two weeks, number eight on the US Billboard 200, and peaking within the top ten across several European charts. Two singles were released to promote the album: the title track and "Wonderous Stories", the latter of which reached number seven in the United Kingdom to become the band's highest-charting single in the country. The album achieved gold certifications from both the British Phonographic Industry (BPI) and the Recording Industry Association of America (RIAA) within a month of its release. The album has since been remastered and reissued multiple times—most notably in 2003 with previously unreleased tracks—though the disappearance of the original multi-track tapes ultimately prevented a high-resolution surround-sound remix.

== Background ==
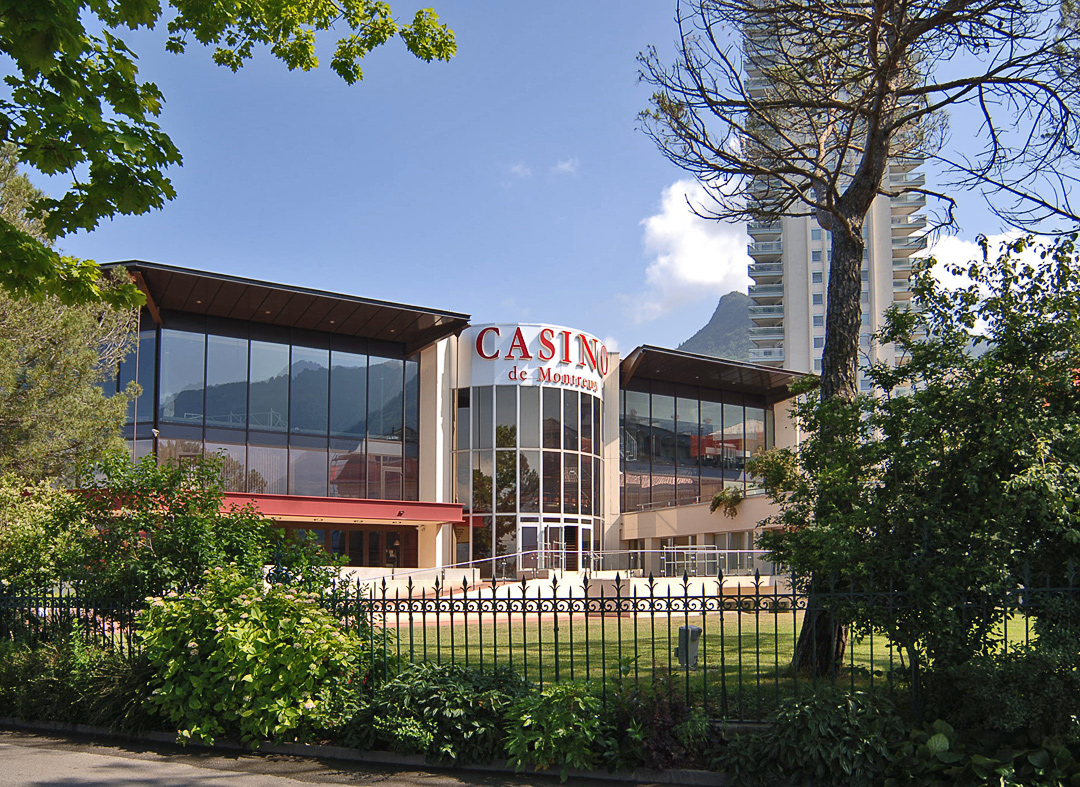
The Montreux Casino complex, which housed Mountain Studios where Yes recorded the album.

In August 1975, Yes concluded their 1974–1975 tour of the United States, Canada, and the United Kingdom in support of their seventh studio album, Relayer (1974). The line-up at the time comprised lead vocalist Jon Anderson, bassist Chris Squire, guitarist Steve Howe, drummer Alan White, and keyboardist Patrick Moraz. Seeking a change in momentum, the group decided to take an extended hiatus so each member could record and release a solo album. Following these individual projects, they regrouped for the 1976 North American tour, which featured some of the highest-attended performances of the band's career. By October 1976, the band members had opted to become tax exiles and subsequently relocated to Montreux, Switzerland, to record their next studio album at Mountain Studios, marking the first time Yes recorded an entire studio album overseas. Upon their arrival, the group discovered that Emerson, Lake & Palmer were still utilizing the facility to record Works Volume 1 (1977) and were running over schedule. As a result, Yes was forced to secure a temporary rehearsal space nearby for several weeks, a period in which a substantial amount of the writing and arranging for their new material was completed.

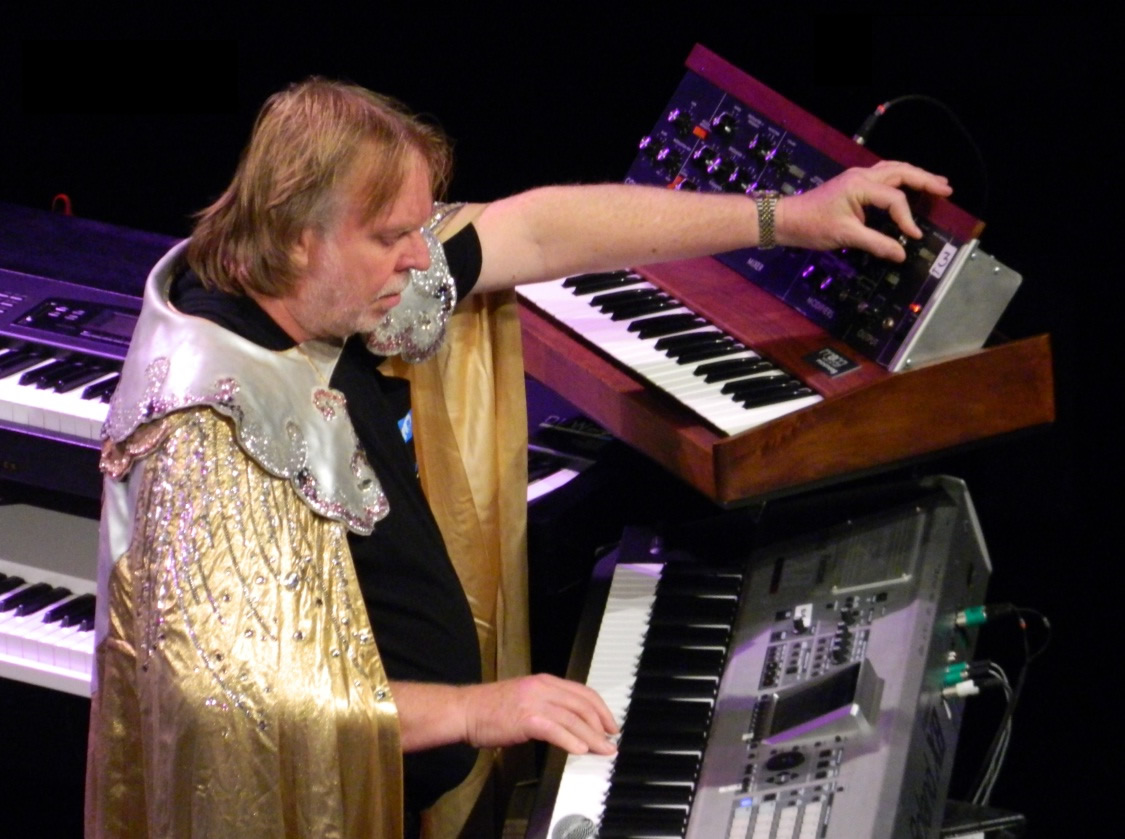
Keyboardist Rick Wakeman, pictured performing in 2012. His return to the band in late 1976 introduced new instrumentation to the sessions.

During the first two months of these writing and rehearsal sessions, Moraz separated from the band—a development he later stated was unexpected. Anderson recalled that the keyboardist "just wasn't playing like he was involved", noting that his sound was not "too good, and that affected his vibe ... it was obvious that he just wasn't getting off on what we were doing." Conversely, Moraz attributed his departure to internal friction, stating months later that he left because of "the enormous psychological pressures at the time within the group... I felt there were a few things going on that I didn't know ... Unfortunately some people did not play the game fair, although the final decision was taken by all members." This internal shift cleared the way for the return of former keyboardist Rick Wakeman, who had originally left Yes in 1974 over artistic differences surrounding their ambitious double album Tales from Topographic Oceans (1973). Wakeman, whom Moraz had originally replaced, was initially invited to play on Going for the One strictly as a session musician by Yes manager Brian Lane, who also managed Wakeman, and business partner Alex Scott. Although Wakeman had built a successful solo career, by mid-1976 he faced mounting financial difficulties after his tour earlier in the year only achieved its minimal targets. His interest in working with the band again was piqued after hearing a tape containing early rehearsal versions of "Going for the One" and "Wonderous Stories". Upon arriving in Switzerland, Wakeman noted a profound shift in the band's interpersonal dynamics, observing: "We began relating to each other for the first time. I think we had all grown up and became much more mature. Maybe I had to grow up more than them."

Wakeman's status quickly shifted from session contributor to permanent member during a subsequent party hosted by Montreux Jazz Festival founder Claude Nobs. At the gathering, Lane and Squire successfully convinced Wakeman to rejoin full-time, arguing that the band would struggle to find a suitable touring keyboardist capable of replicating his intricate arrangements. However, Lane omitted the fact that he had already leaked the news of his official reinstatement to the music press. Wakeman only discovered the finality of his return when he saw himself featured on the front cover of the 4 December 1976 issue of Melody Maker.

== Recording ==
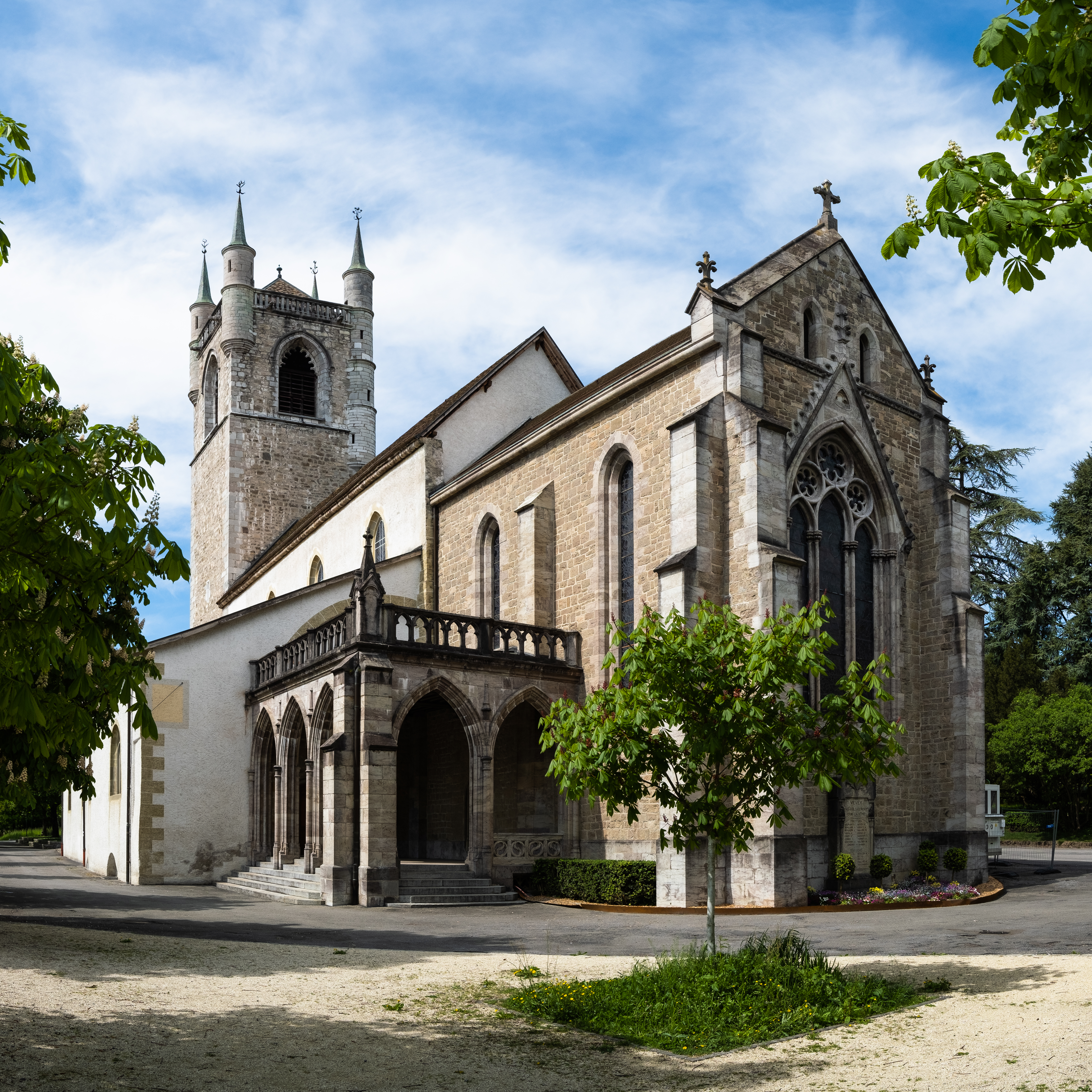
Rick Wakeman played the pipe organ at St. Martin's Church in Vevey for "Parallels" and "Awaken", while the rest of the band performed at Mountain Studios.

The album was recorded from October 1976 to April 1977. In a departure from their previous four studio albums, Yes recorded Going for the One with new engineering personnel, having parted ways with Eddy Offord, who had engineered their studio albums and mixed their live sound since 1970. Following the Relayer tour, Offord felt the band's musical style had become "a bit stale" and believed a split was necessary to allow him to work with other artists. Consequently, Yes hired recording engineer John Timperley, who was assisted by David Richards. For the first time in their career, the album was solely produced by the band members themselves. The sessions also marked the first engineering credit for Yes's future live sound mixer Nigel Luby, who recalled that he "did little more than watch and acquaint myself with the equipment." Squire later recalled that the tracking sessions involved numerous heated arguments regarding the use of echo effects, as the group members were deeply divided over its application.

The recording sessions reflected a deliberate shift in the band's musical direction. Having constructed Tales from Topographic Oceans and Relayer around extended, conceptual tracks, Yes decided to scale back their approach to record shorter, more accessible songs that critic and band biographer Chris Welch described as "user friendly". Howe recalled an instance where the band had begun arranging a five-minute introduction to a song before scrapping it, realising that "there are more ways of getting into songs [...] it was time to go back". Howe noted that several tracks originated from ideas left over from other eras of the band's history, specifically "Turn of the Century" and portions of "Awaken". Conversely, Squire stated that other sections were almost entirely improvised in the studio, including the extended keyboard movement in "Awaken" and various closing instrumental solos. Anderson emphasised this lighter studio atmosphere: "The album is a kind of celebration [...] Over the last two or three years we've been experimenting a lot and we're happy to have been given that chance. [...] We've come back to a happier medium. [...] If we wanted another 'Tales' concept we would have gone in that direction, but we needed to relax for a while—a little more laughing and jive."

In addition to the primary tracking at Mountain Studios, "Parallels" and "Awaken" feature the pipe organ of St. Martin's Church in the nearby town of Vevey. The band initially considered using a mobile recording studio unit on location, but Timperley persuaded them to rent a high-fidelity telephone line instead, allowing the organ's audio signal to be fed directly back into the studio mixing console. For "Parallels", the tracking was performed live with Wakeman playing inside the church while the rest of the band performed simultaneously at the studio. On "Awaken", the church organ was completed as an overdub. Wakeman described the remote recording experience as "absolute magic". He also updated his keyboard rig for the sessions by introducing a Polymoog, a polyphonic synthesizer, which supplemented his traditional array of the Mellotron, Hammond organ, RMI Electra Piano, and Minimoog.

== Songs ==
=== Side one ===
"Going for the One" was originally written by Anderson roughly two to three years before the album was recorded. Although he had presented the song to the group at the time of writing, the other members opted against recording it, and the piece was discarded. Squire later rediscovered the track on a rehearsal cassette tape and brought it into the studio, where the band chose to develop it further. Howe performs on a dual-neck Fender steel guitar throughout the entire track—an instrument he had introduced to the band on Close to the Edge—and derived the song's musical introduction from slide riffs he played during sound checks on the 1976 tour. Lyrically, Anderson was inspired by an array of disparate concepts, including professional sports, horse racing, a film he had seen about navigating the Grand Canyon river on a rubber dinghy, and the idea of a cosmic mind. Years later, Howe reflected on the track as a highly dynamic piece of music that remained an underrated and underplayed element of the band's repertoire.

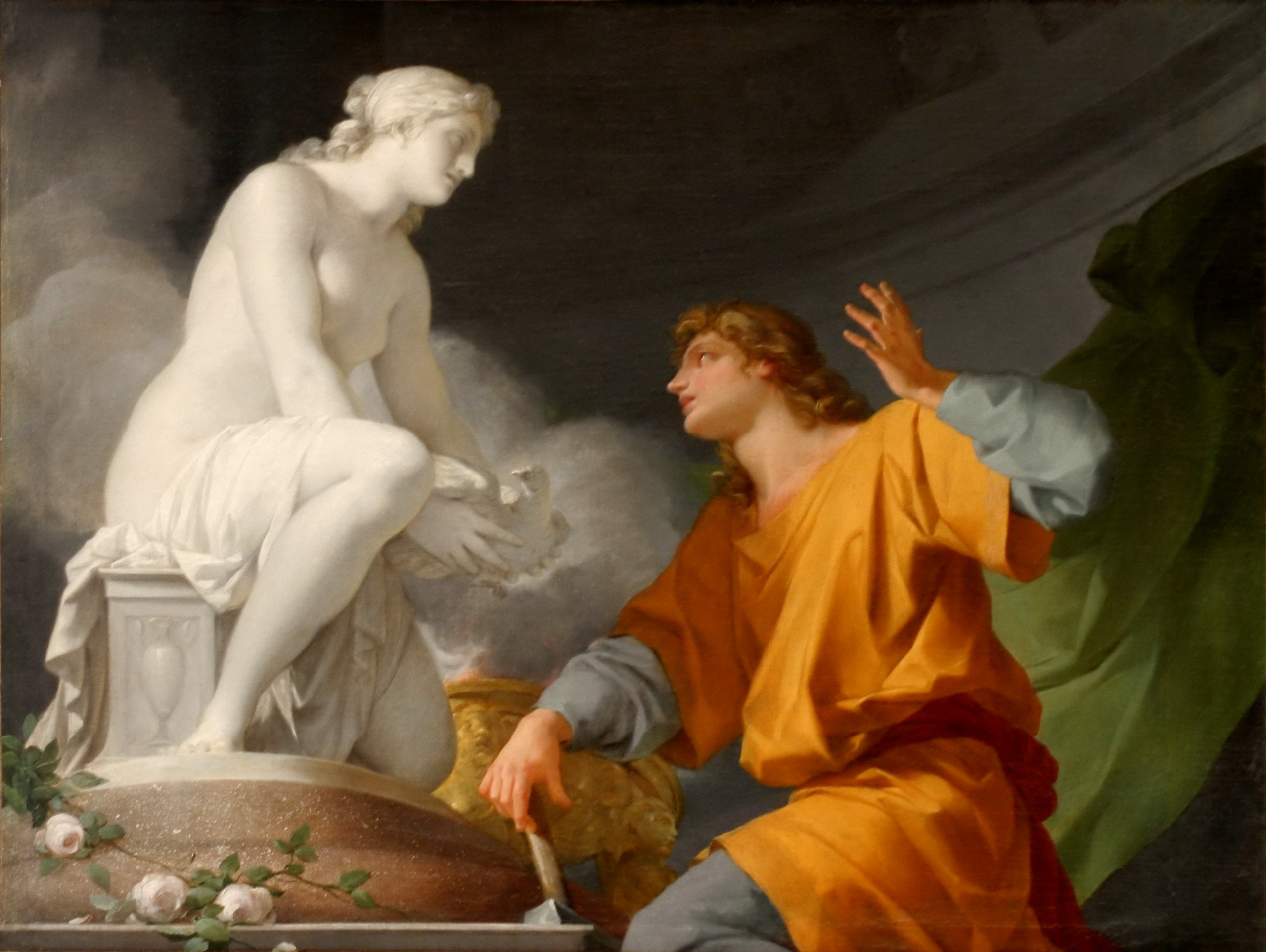
"Turn of the Century" was partly inspired by Pygmalion, a sculptor from Greek mythology who falls in love with a statue he carved that subsequently comes to life.

"Turn of the Century" is credited to Anderson, Howe, and White, representing the only track on the album to feature White as a co-writer. The narrative lyrics tell the story of a sculptor named Roan, whose wife dies during the winter; in his deep grief, he carves a lifelike stone statue of her that eventually comes to life. Anderson drew the narrative idea from Puccini's opera La bohème, with additional inspiration from the Greek mythological figure Pygmalion. The arrangement was considerably shorter in its early form, but as the band expanded the structure, Anderson suggested the arrangement should convey the story musically before he applied the lyrics. White composed the song's initial chord sequences on piano and wrote the foundational vocal melody, which Anderson adopted for the final lyric. The piano chords were later expanded in specific movements by Howe, and White designed the closing climax where the percussion incorporates timpani. The opening acoustic minutes of the track subsequently became one of Howe's favorite musical pieces recorded by the band.

"Parallels" originated from a collection of songs that Squire had written for his debut solo album, Fish Out of Water (1975). The track was left off due to the physical runtime constraints of a vinyl record and because Squire felt its musical style did not match the rest of the album. When reviewing material for Going for the One, Squire suggested the song to the band, and it was warmly received by the other members. Squire noted the unique juxtaposition of musical styles on the final recording, which pitted his blues-influenced bass playing against Wakeman's heavy pipe organ work, which Wakeman played with the organ stops set to full capacity to match the volume of the bass. In its rough rehearsal state, the track was absent of any guitar riffs. Lyrically, Squire stated that the song deals with a "spiritual kind of love" that offers a message of hope, which he considered a recurring motif throughout his songwriting career.

=== Side two ===
"Wonderous Stories" is the second track on the album to be written solely by Anderson. He composed the song while living in Montreux, Switzerland, recalling that it was inspired by a memorable, picturesque day during which the title and lyrics entered his mind. Anderson described the underlying meaning of the track as an appreciation of "the joys of life, as opposed to the uptightedness of some aspects of life," drawing additional inspiration from romantic fiction and dream sequences. Musically, Howe noted the song's strong classical framework, and the track features Howe performing on a 12-string Portuguese guitar—a lute-like instrument he had previously utilized on "I've Seen All Good People"—while Wakeman performs on a Polymoog synthesizer. White contributed the foundational idea of having the drums and bass guitar perform on odd beats throughout the arrangement.

"Awaken" is a fifteen-minute epic credited to Anderson and Howe. The musical composition originated at a hotel, where Anderson repeatedly overheard Howe practicing a specific chord sequence on his guitar; this prompted Anderson to record vocal ideas over the sequence onto a cassette tape. Howe had previously developed the opening guitar solo as part of an intended standalone solo piece; for the track's diverse movements, he incorporated both a Sho-Bud pedal steel guitar and his Rickenbacker 12-string electric guitar. Anderson's primary lyrical and thematic inspiration for the track was Calvin Miller's 1975 book The Singer: A Classic Retelling of Cosmic Conflict, an allegorical poem casting the story of Jesus as a cosmic singer whose song could not be silenced. He was also significantly influenced by reading a biography of the Dutch painter Rembrandt.

Former keyboardist Moraz had originally composed an introduction for the track that went unused by the band; he later adapted this piece into "Time for a Change" for his solo album Out in the Sun (1977). For the track's middle section, Anderson performed on a harp to evoke a Baroque or Vivaldi-inspired texture, and he later highlighted the strength of the final section's lyrics and Wakeman's keyboard arrangement. The arrangement features prominent choral passages performed by the Richard Williams Singers, whose arrangements were directed by Wakeman, alongside the Swiss choir Ars Laeta of Lausanne, which was recorded on location at the Église des Planches church in Montreux. The dramatic middle interlude and musical climax of the piece also feature White performing extensively on tuned percussion instruments.

== Artwork and design ==
In addition to a change of producers and engineers, Going for the One marked a major departure in the band's choice of cover artists. Since 1971, Yes had collaborated exclusively with Roger Dean, who became famous for his surreal, fantastical landscapes and had designed the band's distinctive "bubble" logotype. While the band were recording, Dean traveled to Montreux to present a painting concept for the cover, which depicted fragments of rock floating in the sky, with the largest piece hosting trees and a pool of water—intended as a conceptual sequel to his artwork for the live album Yessongs (1973). Dean recalled that Anderson dismissed his ideas, presenting a rough sketch of his own design requirements instead. Conversely, Anderson claimed that the band had approached Dean to design the sleeve but that the artist was unwilling to visit them in Switzerland. Guitarist Steve Howe noted that "a certain member" was simply no longer interested in working with Dean, ending their collaboration until Drama (1980); in his 2021 memoir, Howe attributed the temporary split to a "misunderstanding".

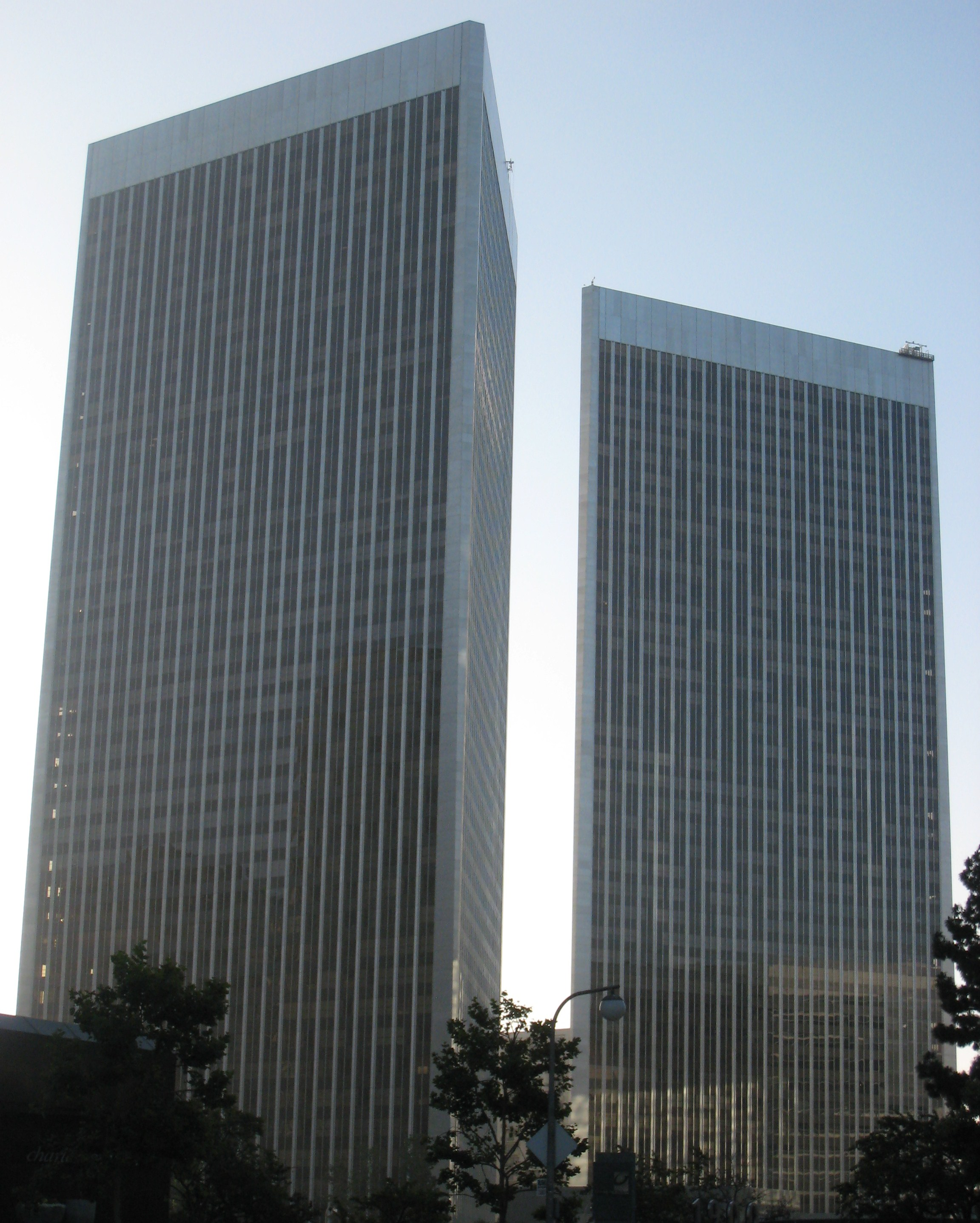
The Century Plaza Towers in Los Angeles, California, which serve as the primary architectural focal point of the album's front cover image.

The band subsequently commissioned Storm Thorgerson and Aubrey Powell of the design studio Hipgnosis to create the artwork, representing a revitalised internal attitude and mirroring the band's return to direct, concise compositions. Graphic artist George Hardie also contributed to the layout. Packaged as a triple-gatefold sleeve, the front photograph depicts the back of a standing nude male looking toward the Century Plaza Towers in Los Angeles, California, set against a blue sky. By the time of release, Yes had acquired full ownership of Dean's logo from its prior co-ownership agreement and placed it prominently on the cover; Dean received a credit in the liner notes. The inside gatefold features individual photographs of the band members positioned along the edge of Lake Geneva and Île de Peilz, a small natural island hosting a single tree. Freelance artist Richard Manning, who prepared the layout for Hipgnosis, utilised double-weighted photographic paper to accommodate the unique triple-gatefold design. Manning executed a light blue dye wash, airbrushed the clouds, and constructed the final look via photomontage, while the geometric coloured lines intersecting the cover were added during printing. Anderson stated that the coloured lines intersecting the male represented "points of the anatomy relative to our development."

Howe admitted he was not completely "thrilled" with the design at the time but acknowledged that it complemented the musical content, expressing relief that Dean's logo was preserved; by 2021, he noted he harboured "no hard feelings" regarding the decision. Journalistic and critical reactions to the sleeve were notable; Melody Maker reporter and band biographer Chris Welch wrote that "gone were the elaborate Roger Dean landscapes. In their place came stark, geometric simplicity. Anticipating computer designs of the future... it symbolised a new look for Yes". Rock critic Martin Popoff later observed that the sleeve captured a "late-'70s escapism through the clean lines of Hipgnosis, who combine slick, futuristic geometric urban angles with a man in his birthday suit, perhaps urgently propelling the band forward, while simultaneously embracing roots".

To support the release, Atlantic Records launched an extensive outdoor billboard campaign. Howe recalled being highly amused to find that a massive promotional billboard on Sunset Boulevard in Los Angeles had censored the artwork by painting a pair of blue trousers over the nude man's buttocks and thighs. He questioned the necessity of the censorship, joking that the original image was unlikely to offend the "pimps, drug dealers and loose women" who frequented the street at the time.

== Release and commercial reception ==
Going for the One was released in the United States on 12 July 1977 and in the United Kingdom on 15 July 1977, available on LP, audio cassette, and 8-track tape. The commercial release of the album had been temporarily delayed due to various structural problems encountered during the vinyl pressing phase. Despite the delay, the record became a major commercial success for the band, reaching number one on the UK Albums Chart—marking their second album to top the chart following Tales from Topographic Oceans—where it remained for two weeks in August 1977. It also peaked at number eight on the US Billboard 200.

Internationally, the album achieved strong chart placements across Europe, including peaking at number seven on the Norwegian charts and reaching the top ten in Germany, France, Sweden, and the Netherlands. The album was certified gold by the Recording Industry Association of America (RIAA) on 2 August 1977 for sales exceeding 500,000 copies in the United States. In the United Kingdom, the album initially earned a silver certification from the British Phonographic Industry (BPI) on 19 September 1977 before eventually achieving a gold certification milestone.

To promote the record, two singles were pulled from the track listing in 1977. The lead single, "Wonderous Stories", was backed with "Parallels" as the B-side. The single peaked at number seven on the UK Singles Chart, supported by the band's first official promotional music video, which received television broadcast rotation on the BBC's music show Top of the Pops. The track remains the highest-charting single of the band's career in the United Kingdom. The second single, "Going for the One", featured an edited version of "Awaken Pt. 1" on the B-side, and reached number 24 on the UK charts.

== Critical reception ==
Professional ratings
Review scores
Source	Rating
AllMusic	3/5 stars
Christgau's Record Guide	C
The Daily Vault	A−
Music Week	4/4 stars
Pitchfork	7.5/10
Rolling Stone	(favourable)
The Rolling Stone Album Guide	3.5/5 stars

Upon release, the album garnered positive reviews from contemporary music critics. Writing for the Los Angeles Times, Steve Pond asserted that the album succeeded because the band had "lowered rather than raised its sights. By going back to basics rather than trying to top its previous 'extravaganzas', Yes has produced its most appealing collection" since Close to the Edge (1972). Pond praised the "refreshing energy" of the performances but observed a "kitchen-sink approach to song-writing, throwing everything into a composition but sometimes failing to smoothly integrate the disparate elements." In Record Mirror, reviewer Robin Smith awarded the album a five-star "+" rating, the publication's highest designation. Smith lauded the title track as "an uncharacteristic piece of boogie" boasting a potent atmosphere and effective ending, concluding that the record "dispel[s] all your fears that the band are over the hill and finished [...] they're back stronger than ever."

Billboard also published a favourable review, noting that the band was "clearly going all out here to create its most ambitious and awesome work yet," selecting the title track, "Wonderous Stories", and "Awaken" as the album's standout cuts. Reviewing the record for Rolling Stone in September 1977, John Swenson warmly declared that "Yes finds a remedy for cosmic doldrums," arguing that the band successfully re-established their musical relevance by balancing virtuoso, high-end studio technology with accessible melodic structures.

Retrospective assessments have remained highly favourable. Band biographer and music journalist Chris Welch welcomed the record following the dense structures of Tales from Topographic Oceans and Relayer, citing its "melodic simplicity" as a "breath of fresh air" that retained its strength decades later. Welch commended Wakeman's performance and the group's integration of his talents, which he felt had been underutilised on Tales. He praised every track individually, calling "Wonderous Stories" a melody that allowed the group "to fly without really trying" and the closing section of "Awaken" "quite beautiful ... the kind of music making now almost a lost art."

Ross Boissoneau of AllMusic described Going for the One as "perhaps the most overlooked item in the Yes catalog," viewing it as a spiritual successor to Fragile (1971). Boissoneau remarked that its five tracks "retain mystical, abstract lyrical images, and the music is grand and melodic, the vocal harmonies perfectly balanced by the stinging guitar work of Steve Howe, Wakeman's keyboards, and the solid rhythms of Alan White and Chris Squire." He characterised "Awaken" as an evocative track with lyrics that were "spacey in the extreme," while praising the vocal blend of Anderson and Squire alongside the addition of Anderson's harp and White's tuned percussion. Paul Stump, in his 1997 book The Music's All that Matters: A History of Progressive Rock, noted that the album was an unexpected triumph for Yes, capturing critical and commercial acclaim despite arriving at the height of the punk rock movement. Stump singled out "Turn of the Century" as a "masterstroke of textural finesse" and characterised "Parallels" as a forceful composition moving at an intimidating velocity, culminating in one of the band's most intense climaxes. However, the graphic design layout has received mixed retrospective commentary; in 2024, Rolling Stone ranked the Hipgnosis design on its list of the worst album covers of all time, criticising the stark architectural transition away from the band's traditional fantasy art style.

== Tour ==
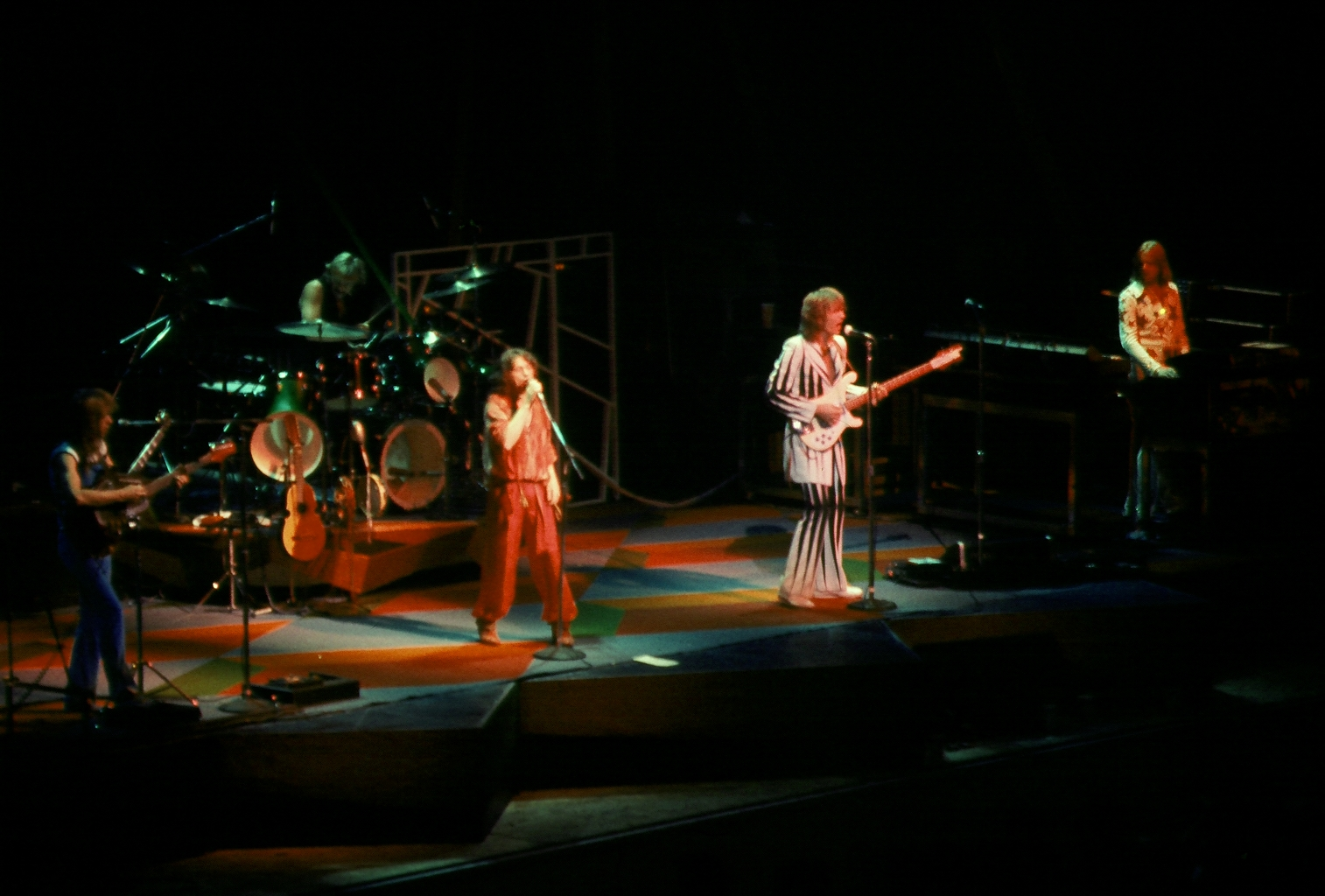
Yes performing live onstage in Indianapolis on 30 August 1977 during the Going for the One Tour.

Yes supported Going for the One with an extensive concert tour of the United States, Canada, and Europe that ran from 30 July to 6 December 1977, consisting of 89 dates and featuring Donovan as their opening act. The stage set featured a much simpler design compared to the band's previous three tours, centring around a series of illuminated shapes that projected a three-dimensional visual effect. Wakeman's extensive keyboard rig was custom-arranged on two distinct tiers. During the performances, Anderson was illuminated in multi-coloured lights as he sang an excerpt of "The Beautiful Land" from the musical The Roar of the Greasepaint – The Smell of the Crowd.

The tour was highlighted by a residency in London, consisting of six consecutive sold-out nights at Wembley Arena that were attended by more than 50,000 people. In order to execute the disparate bass parts required for the multi-movement track "Awaken", Squire performed using a custom triple-necked bass guitar constructed in 1975 by Wal for Roger Newell, the bassist in Wakeman's solo touring group, the English Rock Ensemble. Live recordings captured during the European leg of the tour were subsequently released on the band's second live album, Yesshows (1981).

Decades later, Yes selected Going for the One to anchor their first Album Series Tour, which ran from March 2013 to June 2014. During this tour, the album was performed live in its entirety and in its original track order, featuring a line-up with lead vocalist Jon Davison.

== Reissues ==
Going for the One was first reissued on CD across Europe in 1988. A digitally remastered CD followed in 1994, which was prepared by mastering engineer George Marino at Sterling Sound. In 2003, Rhino and Elektra Records released an expanded, digitally remastered CD featuring seven bonus tracks comprising studio outtakes and rehearsals.

Two specialised audiophile editions were introduced in 2013. The first was a high-resolution version manufactured by Audio Fidelity for the Super Audio CD (SACD) format. The second was a reissue by Friday Music, which pressed the album on 180-gram audiophile vinyl; this production utilised analogue tape dubs due to reports that the original multi-track master tapes were missing or lost. A limited-edition vinyl pressing was also distributed internationally by Pan Am Records. Because the multi-track session tapes remained unaccounted for, the album was excluded from the band's extensive 5.1 surround sound remix campaign helmed by producer Steven Wilson, who had remixed their five preceding studio albums.

== Track listing ==
All tracks are written by Yes.

Side one
No.	Title	Writer(s)	Length
1.	"Going for the One"	Anderson	5:30
2.	"Turn of the Century"	Anderson; Howe; White	7:58
3.	"Parallels"	Squire	5:52
Total length:			19:20

Side two
No.	Title	Writer(s)	Length
1.	"Wonderous Stories"	Anderson	3:45
2.	"Awaken"	Anderson; Howe	15:38
Total length:			19:23; 38:43

Bonus tracks (2003 remaster)
No.	Title	Writer(s)	Length
6.	"Montreux's Theme"	Howe; Squire; Anderson; White	2:38
7.	"Vevey (Revisited)"	Anderson; Wakeman	4:46
8.	"Amazing Grace"	traditional (arranged by Squire)	2:36
9.	"Going for the One" (Rehearsal)	Anderson	5:10
10.	"Parallels" (Rehearsal)	Squire	6:21
11.	"Turn of the Century" (Rehearsal)	Anderson; Howe; White	6:58
12.	"Eastern Numbers" (Early version of "Awaken")	Anderson; Howe	12:16
Total length:			79:28

Notes

- "Montreux's Theme" and "Amazing Grace" first appeared on Yesyears, released in 1991.
- The version of "Vevey (Revisited)" featured here is different from the ones released on Yesyears.

== Personnel ==
Credits are adapted from the album's 1977 and 2003 liner notes.

Yes

- Jon Anderson – lead vocals, harp
- Steve Howe – steel guitar, acoustic and electric guitars, vachalia, pedal steel guitar, vocals
- Chris Squire – bass guitar, fretless bass, 8-string bass, vocals
- Rick Wakeman – piano, electric keyboards, church organ at St. Martin's in Vevey, Polymoog synthesizer, choral arrangement on "Awaken"
- Alan White – drums, percussion, tuned percussion

Additional personnel

- Ars Laeta of Lausanne – choir on "Awaken"
- Richard Williams Singers – choir on "Awaken"

Production

- Yes – production
- John Timperley – recording engineer
- David Richards – assistant recording engineer
- Sean Davis – disc cutting
- Paul Van Der Sonckheyd – disc cutting
- George Hardie – graphics
- Alex Grob – inner spread photography
- Jaques Straessle – inner spread photography
- Hipgnosis – sleeve design, photography
- Roger Dean – Yes logo design
- Brian Lane – executive producer

== Charts ==
=== Weekly charts ===
Chart (1977–78)	Peak position
Australian Albums (Kent Music Report)	16
Canada Top Albums/CDs (RPM)	8
Dutch Albums (Album Top 100)	9
Finnish Albums (Finnish Albums Chart)	16
French Albums (SNEP)	10
German Albums (Offizielle Top 100)	6
Japanese Albums (Oricon)	20
New Zealand Albums (RMNZ)	11
Norwegian Albums (VG-lista)	7
Swedish Albums (Sverigetopplistan)	10
UK Albums (Official Charts)	1
US Billboard 200	8

=== Year-end charts ===
Chart (1977)	Position
UK Albums (OCC)	16

== Certifications ==
Region	Certification	Certified units/sales
Canada (Music Canada)	Gold	50,000^{^}
France (SNEP)	Gold	100,000^{*}
United Kingdom (BPI)	Gold	100,000^{^}
United States (RIAA)	Gold	500,000^{^}
^{*} Sales figures based on certification alone.^{^} Shipments figures based on certification alone.
