= Alpha and Omega (Tonus Peregrinus album) =

Studio album by Tonus Peregrinus
- Released: February 2008
- Recorded: June 2007
- Genre: Choral
- Length: 1:08:05
- Label: Hyperion Records
- Producer: Stephen Rice

Tonus Peregrinus chronology
Seven Letters (2005)	Alpha and Omega (2008)

Professional ratings
Review scores
Source	Rating
Allmusic	4.5/5 stars

Alpha and Omega is Tonus Peregrinus's second album of unaccompanied choral works by Antony Pitts released on Hyperion Records. The album contains the coda from the oratorio Jerusalem-Yerushalayim and the complete cycle of The I AM Sayings of Jesus. Tracks from the album have been broadcast on BBC Radio 3 and Classic FM in the UK.
