= Bom Bom =

Single by Sam and the Womp
- Released: 19 August 2012
- Recorded: 2012
- Genre: Electro swing; Balkan brass
- Length: 2:54
- Label: Stiff
- Songwriters: Bloem de Wilde de Ligny; Aaron Horn; Samuel Ritchie; Raz Olsher

Sam and the Womp singles chronology
"Bom Bom" (2012)	"Ravo" (2013)

Music video
- "Bom Bom" on YouTube

"Bom Bom" is a song by the British-Dutch three-piece music group Sam and the Womp. The track was first released in the United Kingdom on 19 August 2012. The song debuted at number one on the UK Singles Chart with 107,461 copies sold in its first week.

"Bom Bom" was co-produced by Sam Ritchie, Aaron Horn and Raz Olsher at Fossil Studios in Hackney, London.

== Music video ==
A music video to accompany the release of "Bom Bom" was first released onto YouTube on 3 August 2012 at a total length of two minutes and 55 seconds.

== Reception ==
=== Critical reception ===
Lewis Corner of Digital Spy awarded the song three out of five stars, stating: "Lady Oo sing-speaks over an earworm hook of electronic reverb and bouncy brass that's as bonkers as it is addictive. While parts of the track may sound like Basil Brush attempting his best Björk impression at the staff BBQ, it results in a bizarrely catchy tune that we'll all pretend isn't on our iPods for years to come."

=== Chart performance ===
In the chart week dated 1 September 2012, "Bom Bom" debuted at number-one on the UK Singles Chart with 107,461 copies sold. For that same charting week, the track also debuted at number-one on the UK Dance Chart. The song sold 372,000 copies by the end of 2012 making it the 42nd best-selling single of the year.

== Usage in media ==
In the United States, the song was used in the CBS television series Elementary where it was used in an opening scene from the episode "The Deductionist" in 2013. It also appears two times in the 2013 animated film Escape from Planet Earth. In addition, it is in the official soundtrack of the 2012 Xbox 360 game Forza Horizon, and was used in promotional material for the MTV series Geordie Shore. In 2013, it featured in TV commercials for Kmart Australia. In Canada, the song has been used in a series of TV commercials for the Joe Fresh line of clothing. From 2021, British online casino 32Red was using the song in an advertising campaign featuring comedian Leigh Francis. It is also featured in The Sims 3: Island Paradise and is sung in Simlish. It is also featured in the first trailer of Free Birds, and can be heard in the mystery buddy comedy film Holmes & Watson.

== Track listing ==
Digital download
No.	Title	Length
1.	"Bom Bom" (radio edit)	2:54
2.	"Bom Bom" (Wookie remix – radio edit)	2:53
3.	"Bom Bom" (Wookie remix)	4:42
4.	"Bom Bom" (Pirupa remix)	7:11
5.	"Bom Bom" (instrumental)	2:53

== Charts ==
=== Weekly charts ===
Chart (2012)	Peak position
Australia (ARIA)	4
Austria (Ö3 Austria Top 40)	19
Belgium (Ultratip Bubbling Under Flanders)	43
Canada (Canadian Hot 100)	51
Czech Republic Airplay (ČNS IFPI)	10
Finland (Suomen virallinen lista)	14
Germany (GfK)	38
Ireland (IRMA)	6
Israel International Airplay (Media Forest)	2
Netherlands (Single Top 100)	44
Romania (Romanian Top 100)	84
Scottish Singles Sales (Official Charts)	1
UK Singles (Official Charts)	1
UK Dance (Official Charts)	1
US Hot Dance/Electronic Songs (Billboard)	22

=== Year-end charts ===
Chart (2012)	Position
Australia (ARIA)	26
UK Singles (Official Charts Company)	42
Chart (2013)	Position
Australia (ARIA)	98

== Certifications ==
Region	Certification	Certified units/sales
Australia (ARIA)	4× Platinum	280,000^{^}
United Kingdom (BPI)	Platinum	600,000^{‡}
^{^} Shipments figures based on certification alone.^{‡} Sales+streaming figures based on certification alone.
