= MusicDNA (database) =

MusicDNA is a file system that consists of an ontology that describes the underlying structure of the events that make up musical history – "who did what, where, and when" together with a set of user interfaces that allow subscribers to view, add and edit entries. MusicDNA is implemented using a specially developed version of Topic Maps. MusicDNA uses "persistent subject identifiers" to refer to subjects or topics and an ontology or "conceptual reference model" to describe the relationships between those subjects.

== History ==
MusicDNA began life as a website supporting BBC Radio's 18-hour programme, The Unfinished Symphony, and was created by Antony Pitts. This charted the history of Western music during previous millennia. The programme was broadcast from 0600 31 December 1999 to 0005 1 January 2000. The accompanying site used a novel navigational tool which presented each item in the broadcast as an element in a timeline view. In subsequent research Antony Pitts combined the horizontal time dimension with a vertical aesthetic journey, moving from inspiration to reception, to enable a multi-dimensional browsing interface.

The site was picked by the Royal Academy of Music as the starting point for its RAMline music index. Funded by HEIF3 and the Centre for Distance Education the project sought to offer a way of consolidating existing resources, making them accessible to students, staff, and the general public. In 2008 research was presented at several international conferences including Topic Maps 2008, International Association of Music Libraries Annual Conference 2008, and XML Holland 2008, and reached the attention of music journalists.

The research team – including John Drinkwater and Hannah Riddell – then moved their research to a commercial environment working with development budget provided by Brussels-based Pensive SA. This quickly resulted in musicGPS, an application for the iPhone. released 30 September 2009, which records the details of what the user listened to, including time and place, and allows navigation and filtering of the resultant timeline. All data recorded is uploadable to the musicDNA database.
