= Joanna Forbes L'Estrange =

British composer and singer (born 1971)

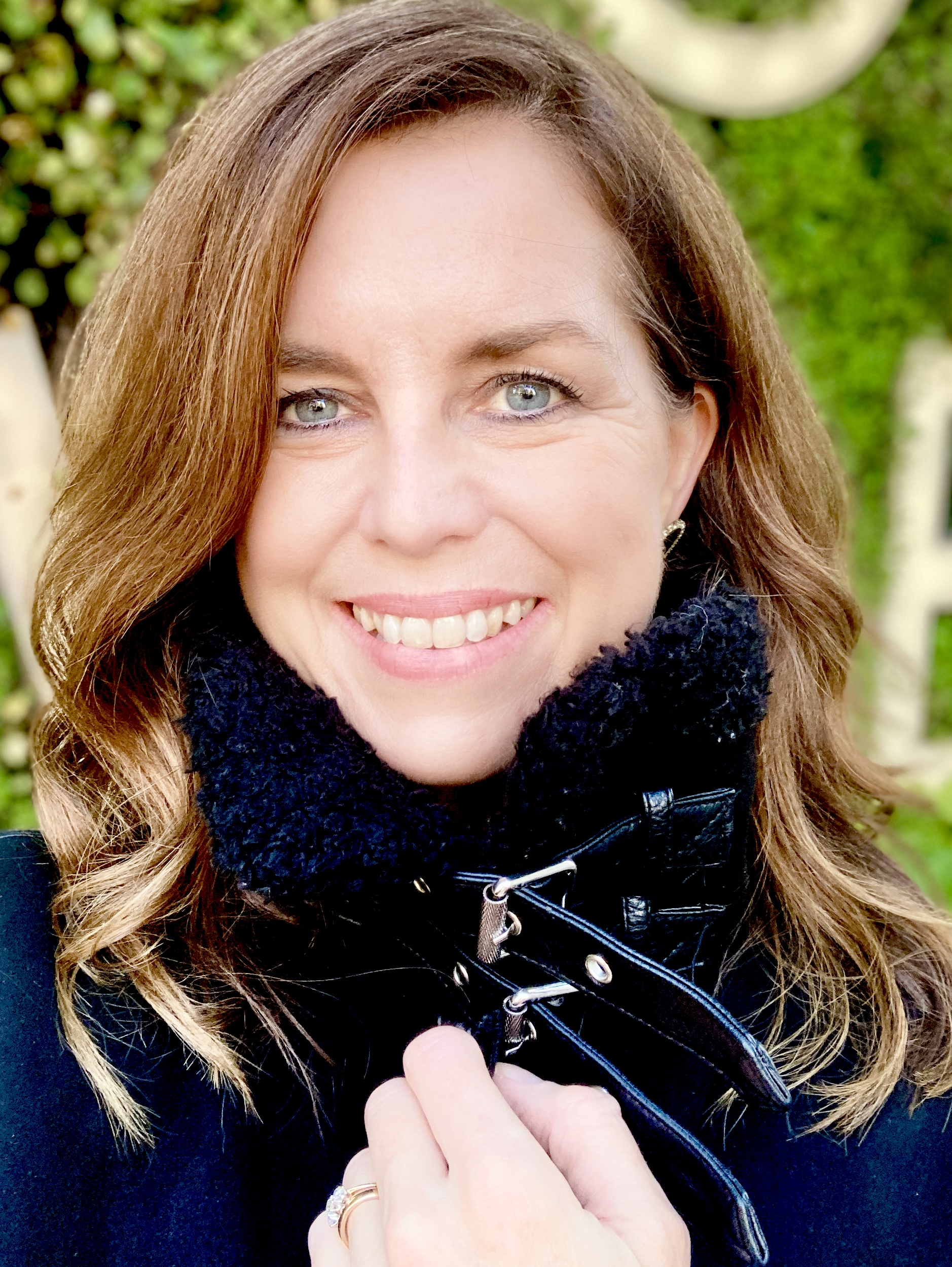
- Forbes L'Estrange in 2022
- Born: Joanna Lucy Forbes; 1971 (age 54–55)
- Occupations: Soprano; Composer; Conductor
- Spouse: Alexander L'Estrange
- Website: www.joannaforbeslestrange.com

Joanna Forbes L'Estrange (born 1971) is a British singer, composer and choir director, known for works including "Twenty-first century Woman", "The Mountains Shall Bring Peace" and A Season to Sing.

== Personal life ==
Forbes L'Estrange is the granddaughter of Scottish viola player and arranger Watson Forbes and daughter of composer and professor Sebastian Forbes. She is married to composer and arranger Alexander L'Estrange.

== Singing ==
Forbes L'Estrange began working with the a cappella group The Swingles as soprano and musical director. From 1998 until 2000, she led the group in concerts in North America, South America, Asia, Europe and Australasia. She appeared in three contemporary operas at Teatro alla Scala, Milan, and at Théâtre du Châtelet in Paris. Forbes L'Estrange worked with musicians including the late Ward Swingle and Luciano Berio, whose orchestral work Sinfonia she has performed with orchestras worldwide.

As a soloist, she specialises in contemporary crossover music including Mass in Blue by Will Todd (recorded in 2019 for Convivium Records) and Sacred Concert (Ellington). She sings jazz with "L’Estranges in the Night", the duo she co-founded with Alexander L'Estrange. As an ensemble singer, she sings with London-based, professional vocal ensembles including London Voices - directed by Ben Parry (musician), Tonus Peregrinus (vocal ensemble) - directed by Antony Pitts and Synergy Vocals - directed by Micaela Haslam, performing Minimal music by Steve Reich and John Adams (composer). She has recorded over twenty CDs with Tenebrae (choir), directed by Nigel Short (singer). She records film soundtrack at London's Abbey Road Studios. Her voice features on the soundtrack to the Wes Anderson 2021 film The French Dispatch in a duet with Jarvis Cocker.

== Composition ==
Forbes L'Estrange wrote the song "Twenty-first Century Woman" in 2018 for International Women's Day 2019. She conducted its recording at Abbey Road Studios with an all-female ensemble, and all proceeds from the song went to charities supporting girls' education.

Forbes L'Estrange is "one of the Royal School of Church Music’s best-selling composers". She was commissioned to compose an anthem to mark the coronation of King Charles III in May 2023. The mountains shall bring peace, a setting of Psalm 72 and Psalm 149, was performed by choirs throughout the world.

In 2025 she composed A Season to Sing, a choral "re-imagining" of Vivaldi's The Four Seasons, to celebrate the 300th anniversary of that work. It was commissioned by 55 choirs, under the auspices of the Royal School of Church Music. It was performed over 50 times in its first year.

== Conducting and directing ==
Forbes L'Estrange founded, and for five years directed, AQUILA, the all-female vocal group of St John’s College, Cambridge. She has been a guest conductor for the National Youth Girls Choir and Choir of the Earth. In 2018, she organised and conducted the first all-female recording session at Abbey Road Studios, recording her song "Twenty-first-century Woman". She was a judge on the Sky 1 series Sing: Ultimate A Cappella.
