= MusicDNA (company) =

Norwegian digital music technology company

- Type: Aksjeselskap
- Founded: 2007
- Headquarters: Bergen, Norway; Ilmenau, Thüringen, Germany and China
- Products: Digital music technology
- Website: corporate.musicdna.com/corporate/company/

MusicDNA, formerly Bach Technology, is a Norwegian company that develops and licenses digital music technology, notably MusicDNA to provide custom, Internet updated multi-media content - like videos, song lyrics, or social media - while audio is played. It has partnered with the company that invented MP3, Fraunhofer Institute for Digital Media Technology (IDMT), for technical expertise. Two of its key investors are former Chief Executive Officer (CEO) at Sony Music Entertainment, Shigeo Maruyama, and MP3's inventor, Karlheinz Brandenburg.

== History ==
Bach Technology A.S., founded by Dagfinn Bach and Karlheinz Brandenburg, is headquartered in Bergen, Norway. Bach was instrumental in the development of digital music technology and MP3 technology in 1993. (Note: Karlheinz Brandenburg is considered to be the MP3 inventor.) He is the company's president. Brandenburg's experience is in the media; He worked for Bertelsmann in Germany. The company has partnered with the company that invented MP3, Fraunhofer Institute for Digital Media Technology (IDMT) in Germany, for their technical expertise. Investors include the former Chief Executive Officer (CEO) at Sony Music Entertainment, Shigeo Maruyama, and MP3's inventor Karlheinz Brandenburg.

Bach Technology is a company that licenses an Internet-accessible database containing information about the contents of audiofiles, and other software related to music recognition. Bach Technology uses MPEG-7 technology to create custom selections based upon the customer's preferences for multi-media content. Dagfinn Bach and Sebastian Schmidt are named on the United States patent for the technology to manage the communication of multiple types of data. (Note: On 26 March 2013, United States Patent number 8,407,224 was issued for "Apparatus and method for generating a collection profile and for communicating based on the collection profile" and assigned to Bach Technology AS in Bergen Norway. The inventors are Sebastian Schmidt from Ilmenau, Germany and Dagfinn Bach from Bergen, Norway. The description is: "An apparatus for generating a collection profile of a collection of different media data items has a feature extractor for extracting at least two different features describing a content of a media data item for a plurality of media data items of the collection, and a profile creator for creating the collection profile by combining the extracted features or weighted extracted features so that the collection profile represents a quantitative fingerprint of a content of the media data collection. This collection profile or music DNA can be used for transmitting information, which is based on this collection profile, to the entity itself or to a remote entity.")

== MusicDNA ==
Bach Technology has developed MusicDNA technology, the next evolutionary step for playing music after MP3. Introduced at the January 2010 MIDEM music industry trade fair in Cannes, MusicDNA is an MP3 file format that produces data and video content while music plays on MP3 players or iPods. This could include social media, like Twitter, videos or information, including tour dates and song lyrics.

Bach intends to differentiate themselves from their competitor, Apple iTunes LP service, by offering the capability of access to real-time information when the player has an Internet connection, accessing more types of information, and ensuring music is legally purchased for download. MusicDNA software was available for free download from the company website starting in 2010. Rhodi Marsden of The Independent questions whether most users will want their music player to have MusicDNA's sophisticated functions.

For MusicDNA to be successful, major labels are required. In early 2010, primarily independent labels had signed up for the service. Additionally, some players may not have the functionality to provide the information that the file format is capable of managing, so its success is dependent upon the player's functionality.

In 2012 Bach Technology developed their new MusicDNA fingerprint solution with three different fingerprints, tailored for different usage scenarios. A fingerprint solution for radio monitoring was launched during the Reeperbahn Festival in 2014, and from 2016 MusicDNA covers 18,000 radio channels world-wide, providing close to real-time radio monitoring for rights holders, managements and agents, world-wide.

== See also ==
- List of online music databases
- Eivind Brydøy, Bach Technology board member
