= Stephen Power =

Australian rules footballer

Personal information
- Full name: Stephen P. Power
- Born: 7 October 1950 (age 76)
- Original team: St Kevin's College
- Height: 179 cm (5 ft 10 in)
- Weight: 80 kg (176 lb)

Playing career^{1}
Years	Club	Games (Goals)
1969–1979	Footscray	177 (25)
- ^{1} Playing statistics correct to the end of 1979.

Stephen Power (born 7 October 1950) is a former Australian rules footballer who played with Footscray in the Victorian Football League (VFL).

Power was a utility, seen mostly on the wing or half back flanks.

The St Kevin's College recruit could also play as a key defender and was a regular fixture in the Footscray team throughout the 1970s.

He finished second, behind Gary Dempsey, in Footscray's 1974 best and fairest awards.
