= Helen Parker-Jayne Isibor =

Nigerian-British opera singer and songwriter

Helen Epega
- Born: Helen Isibor; 1981 (age 44–45); Ibadan, Nigeria
- Other name: The Venus Bushfires
- Education: Brunel University London
- Occupations: Opera singer, songwriter, composer, performance artist
- Notable work: Song Queen: A Pidgin Opera (2015)
- Spouse(s): Baba Epega, m. 2015
- Website: thevenusbushfires.com/about

Helen Epega (née Isibor), also The Venus Bushfires (born 1981), is a Nigerian/British opera singer, songwriter, composer, visual and performance artist, who has written and composed the world's first opera in Pidgin English. Inspired after seeing Wagner's Parsifal, her Song Queen: A Pidgin Opera was presented in London in July 2015.

== Biography ==
Born in Ibadan in southwestern Nigeria into a family with five children, Epega is the daughter of a medical consultant and a storybook writer, both of whom were interested in music. She lived in Benin City until moving to London in the 1980s at the age of seven. After attending an all-girls convent school, she graduated in Communications and Media at Brunel University London.

She began her career as a rapper then found her voice after becoming interested in politically aware singers such as Fela Kuti and Miriam Makeba. When she was in Ibiza in 2007, she discovered the hang drum, which has since become her favourite instrument.

Thanks to funding from Arts Council England, Epega composed the world's first Pidgin English opera Song Queen: A Pidgin Opera along traditional opera lines but while she kept the strings, she introduced traditional African instruments such as the kora and included talking drums, djembes And the hang for percussion. The version premiered at The Place in London in 2015 was an hour long but Epega has since developed an extension to bring it to an hour and a half or two hours. It has also been performed at the Artscape Theatre Centre in Cape Town, South Africa, and was performed in Lagos between 2016 and 2019.

Epega is known as The Venus Bushfires, "a creative collective of one and many", and has explained the name by saying: "When I was in Benin City in 2008 visiting my grandmother, they'd burned the land. And I asked my mother why they did it and she said to clear the ground. Within weeks all the plants shot up really quickly and I realised when a bushfire occurs, it is a possibility for birth. I also used Venus because she's the goddess of love and I'm an amateur astronomer, I love the stars. Together the name is a celebration of balance, of love, the earth, the sacred, the profane and mother nature. It's a celebration of life."

Her most recent (2021) work is "Sounds of Us: A Sound Art Snapshot - Life, Love, Fear, Hope & Protest In The Time Of Pandemic Lockdown".

== Personal life ==
In May 2015, Isibor married the EMC3 chairman Baba Epega.
