= John Drinkwater (composer) =

- Born: c. 1650
- Died: 1711
- Occupations: Composer, Choirmaster, civil servant
- Employer(s): James II, William III
- Known for: Services to the Chapel Royal, Metrical psalter compositions

John Drinkwater (born 1957) is a British music writer and technologist, born in Suffolk. Working for the BBC, he wrote the theme tune and incidental music for the award-winning children's drama series Dodgem. He was musical director for The Bootleg Beatles from 1993–1995. He made a major contribution to the Facing the Radio project (awarded the Radio Academy BT Award in 1995) and to Settling the Score. His technological research includes musicDNA, an ontology and interface for mapping and navigating the musical universe, and the related iPhone app, musicGPS.
