= MusicDNA (file format) =

Music file format

MusicDNA is a music file format developed by some of the key figures involved in the development of the MP3 format.

== Design ==
The format is backwards-compatible with existing MP3 players, and offers the same sound quality. MusicDNA files can contain metadata, such as lyrics, artwork, blog posts and user-created content, which can be updated continually via the internet. MusicDNA is intended to be a competitor to Apple's iTunes LP, which also offers user-added content.

MusicDNA was created by Norwegian developer Dagfinn Bach, Chief Executive Officer of Bach Technology. German developer Karlheinz Brandenburg, credited with the invention of the .mp3 file, is one of the investors in this project.

As of January 2010, no major record labels have adopted the new format, although a number of independent labels have shown an interest. MusicDNA files are likely to be more expensive than current music downloads.
