= John Timperley (sound engineer) =

British sound engineer (1940–2006)

- Born: 11 January 1940
- Died: 20 September 2006 (aged 66)
- Occupation: British audio engineer

John Timperley (11 January 1940 – 20 September 2006), was a British audio engineer, who worked on recordings of a number of important musicians and groups from the 1960s to the 1990s.

Timperley was influential in the music recording industry in the United Kingdom and other countries. He gained his training at the IBC Studios in London in the late 1950s, working with his long time friend, Keith Grant, primarily on classical recordings and the early pop music. He then worked at Ryemuse Studios, where he recorded Cream's first LP and numerous hits in the 1960s.

He then briefly worked at Olympic Studios, before being asked to set up the new Chappell recording studios at Bond Street where he subsequently became manager and chief engineer. At this time Bing Crosby, Tony Bennett, Shirley Bassey Thelonious Monk, Count Bassie and Stephane Grappelli all recorded at Chappell under Timperly's control. During this time he was involved in the recordings for Magical Mystery Tour where he first met Paul McCartney, establishing a relationship which continued on and off throughout his career with works including the 1991 Liverpool Oratorio. In 1976 through 1977, Timperley was the sound engineer for Going for the One (1977) by Yes.

From 1980 to 1991, Timperley was senior recording engineer at Angel Recording Studios, Islington, working on projects including, Courtney Pine, Michael Crawford, Anne Dudley, Andy Sheppard, Karl Jenkins.

In 1991, Timperley produced the album A Tribute to Hollywood featuring Academy Award-winning songs from many decades from a cappella to Big Band accompaniment with Cantabile - the London Quartet

In the 1990s, Timperley started undertaking film soundtrack recording and mixing, including Lord of the Flies, Lost in Space and The Pianist. Timperley died on 20 September 2006 at the age of 65 of leukemia.
