= Raz Olsher =

English producer and songwriter

Raz Olsher is an English, London-based record producer, songwriter and composer. Olsher works out of Fossil Studios, which he founded in 2009 in Hackney Central, East London and has since worked with Gilles Peterson, Lemar, MJ Cole, Krust, Sam Lee for his 2012 Mercury Prize nominated album A Ground of Its Own, Ebe Oke for the album Valor (2011), Bishi, Nathaniel Rateliff, Zej, Lois Winstone and South Africa's Thandiswa Mazwai. In 2012, he topped the UK charts with "Bom Bom" by Sam and the Womp which he co-wrote and co-produced. The song exceeded one million sales worldwide.

More recently, Olsher has been producing and writing with artists such as Shannon Saunders, Tara McDonald, Ayanna Witter-Johnson for her latest EP Black Panther, Thabo and Lady Chann.

Alongside recording and producing artists, Olsher has scored the music for a range of shorts, documentaries and feature lengths such as Vertigo (2005), Encore (2007), Sophie (2008), The Last Ten (2011), Child (2011), Raw Muscle (2011), The Tempest (2011), Buoy and The Ninth Cloud. Most recently, he has written the score for Twelve (2013), a short starring Monica Dolan and has created the sound design for Not Ever starring Emilia Fox, featuring original music from Roger O'Donnell. Olsher has also worked with a number of premium brands producing original audio content for television and radio including Coca Cola, Budwesier, Sonos, Captain Morgan and L'Oriel.

In 2011, he won Ditto's Critic's Choice award for his interpretation of Rachmaninoff's "Prelude in C-sharp Minor", which later paved the formation of his experimental trio, Rubato.

Olsher is also known on the live dance music circuit, most recently through his live house music collective, named Bassically, who craft sophisticated electronic dance music originally programmed by machines using purely live instrumentation. Their first original release was "Know This Land" with a remix by Nice7 under Noir Music. Prior to this, Olsher lead another similar conceptual act named Zej; a live duo creating innovative performances through the use of technology and musical instruments, covering genres such as dubstep, jungle, house and electro. They were awarded the BBC Radio 1 New Talent Award for these performances.

Finally, branching out into the disco scene comes the last of Olsher's emerging projects. Aliased as Bubblegum, releases are set for release under the label ISM by artist Yam Who?, with remixes by Qwest Life.
