= Severnside Composers Alliance =

Severnside Composers Alliance is an organization founded in 2003 by composer Sulyen Caradon with a number of other composers based in the Bristol, Bath and Gloucestershire [Stroud, Gloucester, Cheltenham] area of Southwest England, with the aim of promoting performances of their own music, and stimulating a wider interest in the composition and performance of new music in the region. Performances in recent years have been given by high quality professional musicians such as The Bristol Ensemble, Lore Lixenberg [mezzo-soprano], Sarah Leonard [soprano] with Stephen Gutman [piano], Zarah Hible [mezzo-soprano], Mary Barrett [clarinet], Roger Huckle [violin and viola], Madeleine Mitchell [Violin] and Charlotte Newstead [soprano]. Some composer members also perform and accompany on the piano. The current chairman is Jolyon Laycock.

Concerts in recent times have included piano triettes [three people at one piano], a choral event, song recitals and specialist concerts focusing on a particular instrument. To this end, two of the concerts have been called 'Cello on the Edge' [Alison Gillies - cello soloist] and 'Clarinet on the Edge'. In 2017 the Alliance collaborated with violinist Madeleine Mitchell leading to the composition and performance of ten new works for violin and piano by Severnside composers. In 2018 the Alliance worked with Gemini Ensemble in the creation of "Space-Time-Sounds" featuring coloratura soprano Sarah Leonard. Concert venues have included Bristol Music Club, Colston Hall, Arnos Vale Anglican chapel, St Paul's Church in Clifton and the Christian Community in Stroud. Included in the programmes are classic examples of 20th century music by composers such as John Cage, George Crumb, Arnold Schoenberg and Vaughan Williams. Several composers have released their own CDs, with the Alliance having also having made some recordings.

Composer members come from varying professional fields and activities that include academia, performance, arts administration, school teaching, private teaching, workshop leadership and composition as their major activity. Some composers have been commissioned inside and beyond Severnside Composers Alliance, whilst others have not.

A Severnside Composers Alliance concert is an opportunity to experience and appreciate music by composers living in the West of England region. Musical styles are varied, with diatonic and free and experimental harmonies and melodic lines intermingling within each concert. Composer talks are also a feature of the alliance's activities, with opportunities to hear analysis of the composers' thought processes, structure, form and interests in composing their music.
