= Tonus Peregrinus =

British contemporary early-music group

Tonus Peregrinus is a British vocal ensemble specialising in early music and contemporary sacred music, especially that of founder and director, Antony Pitts. Established in 1990, the ensemble have recorded numerous CDs for Naxos, their first winning the Cannes Classical Award (Arvo Pärt's Passio), and two albums of Antony Pitts' music for Hyperion Records – Seven Letters and Alpha and Omega. Their latest album, Music from the Eton Choirbook (Naxos 8.572840), was recorded using a new microphone technique developed by NRK engineer Geoff Miles.

The ensemble sang at the memorial for Alexander Litvinenko.
