= Antony Pitts =

International composer, conductor, and producer (born 1969)

Antony Pitts (born 1969 in Farnborough, Kent) is an international composer, conductor, and producer.

His compositions have been published by Faber Music, with CDs of choral music on Hyperion Records and other recordings on Harmonia Mundi, Naxos, and Unknown Public. In 1996, he won the Radio Academy BT Award for Facing the Radio, 1995, an early interactive experiment on the internet. In 2004, he won the Prix Italia for A Pebble in the Pond. He was a Senior Producer at BBC Radio 3 until 2005, when he resigned in order to be able to speak to the media about what he regarded as "blasphemy" in the corporation's broadcast of Jerry Springer: The Opera. He was Senior Lecturer in Creative Technology at the Royal Academy of Music from 2006 to 2009. In 2011, he founded publishing foundation and record label 1equalmusic, taking inspiration from John Donne's prayer "Bring us, O Lord God”, which contains the line “no noise nor silence but one equal music”.

Pitts is the founder and director of vocal ensemble TONUS PEREGRINUS, which specializes in early and contemporary choral music, mostly sacred. His research interests include musicDNA. Compositions include the oratorio Jerusalem-Yerushalayim, the coda of which is recorded on the TONUS PEREGRINUS album Alpha and Omega, and Lux Aeterna / Kontakion of the Departed for Alexander Litvinenko.

In 2016, Antony Pitts succeeded Roland Peelman as Artistic Director of Australia's national vocal ensemble, The Song Company.

He is brother of composer and teacher John Pitts.
