= List of compositions by Arvo Pärt =

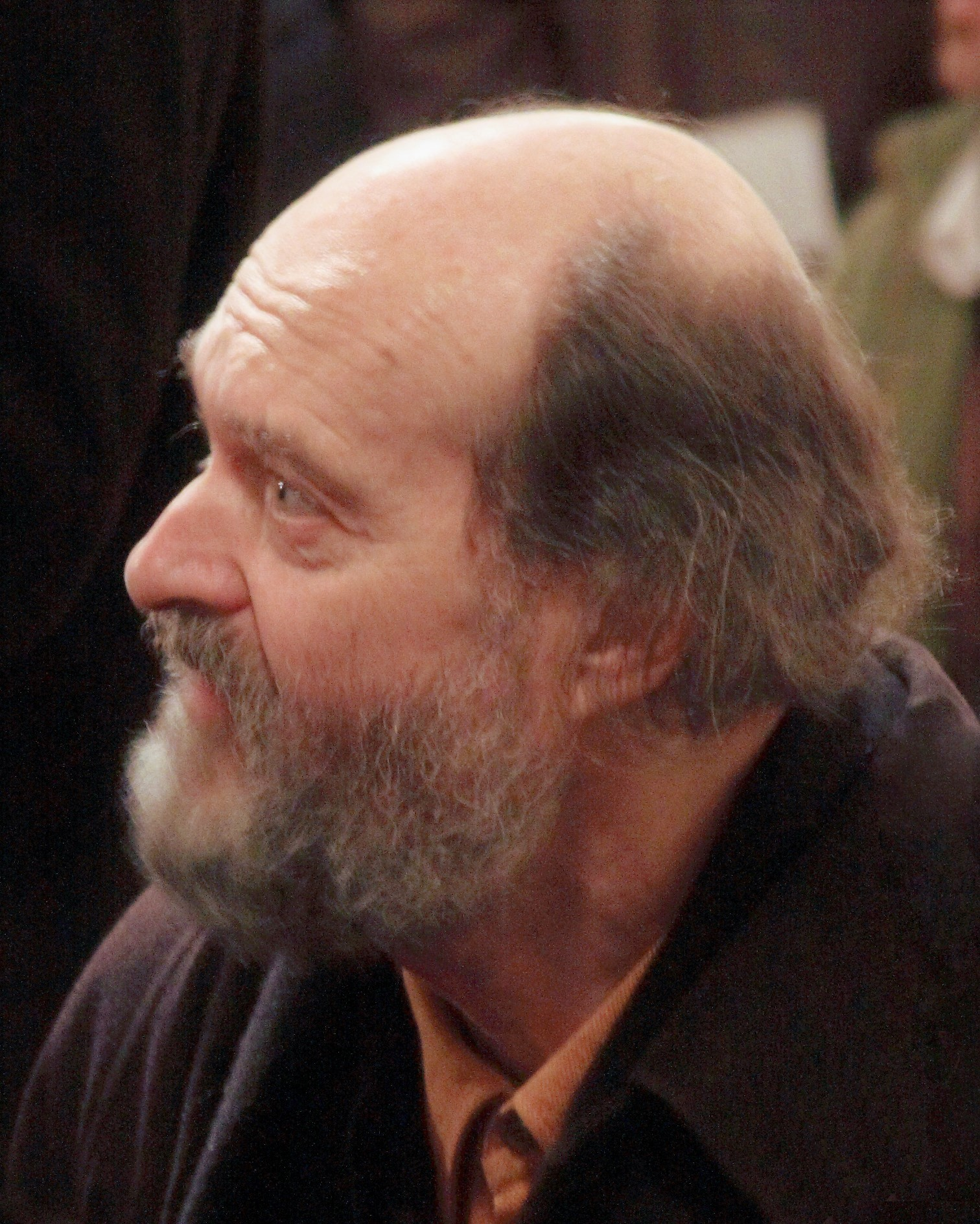
Arvo Pärt in Christ Church Cathedral, Dublin, 2008

This is an incomplete list of works by the Estonian composer Arvo Pärt.

== Compositions ==
=== Vocal and choral works ===
- Our Garden for children's chorus and orchestra (1959/2003)
- Solfeggio for chorus (1964/1996)
- Credo for chorus, orchestra, and piano solo (1968)
- An den Wassern zu Babel saßen wir und weinten for voices or choir and organ or ensemble (1976/1984)
- Missa syllabica for chorus and organ (1977/1996)
- Summa for chorus (1977)
- Sarah Was Ninety Years Old for three voices, percussion and organ (1977/1990)
- De profundis for men's voices, percussion (ad lib.) and organ (1980)
- Passio for soloists, vocal ensemble, choir and instrumental ensemble (1982)
- Es sang vor langen Jahren for alto, violin and viola (1984)
- Wallfahrtslied for tenor or baritone and string quartet or string orchestra (1984/2000)
- Te Deum for chorus, string orchestra and tape (1984–1985/1992)
- Stabat Mater for 3 voices and string trio (1985)
- Magnificat for chorus (1989)
- Miserere for soloists, choir, ensemble and organ (1989/1992)
- Bogoróditse Djévo (rus. Богородице Дево) for chorus (1990)
- The Beatitudes (1990)
- Berliner Messe for SATB soloists or chorus with organ or string orchestra (1990/1992)
- 7 Magnificat-Antiphonen for chorus (1991)
- And One of the Pharisees for three voices (1992)
- Litany for soloists, chorus and orchestra (1994)
- Cantate Domino canticum novum for chorus or soloists and organ (1996)
- Dopo la Vittoria for chorus (1996)
- I Am the True Vine for chorus (1996)
- The Woman with the Alabaster Box for chorus (1997)
- Tribute to Caesar for chorus (1997)
- Kanon Pokajanen for chorus (1997)
- 2 Slawische Psalmen for chorus or soloists (1997)
- Triodion for chorus (1998)
- Como cierva sedienta for soprano, chorus and orchestra (1998)
- Cantiques des degrés for chorus and orchestra (1999/2002)
- Cecilia, vergine romana for chorus and orchestra (1999/2002)
- My Heart's in the Highlands for countertenor and organ (2000)
- Which Was the Son of ... (2000)
- Littlemore Tractus for chorus and organ (2001)
- Nunc Dimittis for chorus (2001)
- Salve Regina for chorus and organ (2001)
- Zwei Wiegenlieder for two women's voices and piano (2002)
- Peace upon you, Jerusalem for female chorus (2002)
- Most Holy Mother of God for four voices (2003)
- In Principio for chorus and orchestra (2003)
- Da pacem Domine for four voices (2004)
- L'Abbé Agathon for soprano, four violas and four celli (2004/2005)
- Anthem of St John the Baptist written for St John's College, Oxford (2005)
- Von Angesicht zu Angesicht for soprano, baritone, clarinet, viola and double bass (2005)
- Estonian Lullaby for female choir or 2 female voices and string orchestra (2006)
- Rozhdestvenskaya kolybel'naya / Christmas Lullaby for female choir or voice and string orchestra (2006) for soprano, 4 violas and 4 violoncellos (2009)
- Veni creator for mixed choir or SATB soloists and organ (2006), for mixed choir and string orchestra (2009)
- Morning Star for mixed choir (2007)
- Sei gelobt, du Baum for baritone, violin, quinterne and double bass (2007)
- The Deer's Cry written for chorus for Louth Contemporary Music Society, Ireland (2008)
- Alleluia-Tropus for mixed vocal ensemble or chamber choir and 8 violoncellos ad lib. (2008), for mixed choir and string orchestra (2010)
- Adam's Lament for mixed choir and string orchestra (2009)
- Vater unser (Our Father) for boy soprano or countertenor or children's choir, version with piano (2011) version with string orchestra or string quintet (2013)
- Beatus Petronius for 2 mixed choirs, woodwind octet, tubular bells and string orchestra (2011)
- Statuit ei Dominus for 2 mixed choirs, woodwind octet and string orchestra (2011)
- Habitare fratres in unum for mixed choir or vocal ensemble (2012)
- Virgencita (Virgin of Guadalupe) (2012)
- My Heart's in the Highlands for countertenor or alto, violin, viola, cello and piano (2013)
- Drei Hirtenkinder aus Fátima for mixed choir (2014)
- Songs from Childhood for children's choir and ensemble or piano (2015): Firefly's Song, Frogs, I Am Already Big, Ladybird's Song, Let the Snow Swish, Road to School, Santa Claus, Sleeping Beauty, Summer Waltz, The Book, The Doll Has No Name, The Little Motor-Scooter, The Song of Atom-Boy, Where Are You, Father Christmas?
- Kleine Litanei for mixed choir (2015)
- And I heard a voice... for mixed choir a cappella (2018)
- Prayer from "Kanon pokajanen" for mixed choir and string orchestra (2018)
- Our Garden for children's choir and ensemble (2019)
- Für Jan van Eyck for choir and organ (2020)

=== Orchestral works ===
- Nekrolog for orchestra Op. 5 (1960)
- Symphony No. 1: Polyphonic Op. 9 (1963)
- Perpetuum mobile for orchestra Op. 10 (1963)
- Symphony No. 2 for orchestra (1966)
- Symphony No. 3 for orchestra (1971)
- Wenn Bach Bienen gezüchtet hätte ... for piano, wind quintet, string orchestra and percussion (1976)
- Fratres for chamber ensemble (1977 in original version)
- Arbos for eight brass instruments and percussion (1977/1986/2001)
- Cantus In Memoriam Benjamin Britten for string orchestra and bell (1977)
- Psalom for string orchestra (1985/1995/1997)
- Festina Lente for string orchestra and harp (1988)
- Summa for string orchestra (1991)
- Silouan's Song for string orchestra (1991)
- Trisagion for string orchestra (1992)
- Mein Weg for 14 string players and percussion (1999)
- Orient & Occident for string orchestra (2000)
- Lennartile / Für Lennart for string orchestra (2006)
- La Sindone for orchestra and percussion (2006)
- Symphony No. 4: Los Angeles (2008)
- These Words ... for string orchestra and percussion (2008)
- Silhouette (Hommage à Gustave Eiffel) for orchestra and percussion (2009)
- Swansong (2013)
- Greater Antiphons for string orchestra (2015)

=== Works for solo instruments and orchestra ===
- Collage sur B-A-C-H, for oboe, string orchestra, harpsichord, and piano (1964). The piece consists of three movements, named after and inspired by traditional Baroque forms:
- Pro et Contra, concerto for cello and orchestra (1966, for Mstislav Rostropovich)
- Tabula Rasa, double concerto for two violins, string orchestra, and prepared piano (1977)
- Fratres for violin, string orchestra and percussion (1992)
- Concerto piccolo über B-A-C-H for trumpet, string orchestra, harpsichord and piano (1994)
- Darf ich ... for violin, bells and string orchestra (1995/1999)
- Fratres for guitar and orchestra (2000)
- Lamentate for piano and orchestra (2002)
- Passacaglia for 1-2 violin, string orchestra and vibraphone ad lib. (2003/2007, for Gidon Kremer's 60th birthday)
- In spe for wind quintet and string orchestra (2010)
- Sequentia for violin, percussion and string orchestra (2014)
- La Sindone for violin and orchestra (2019)

=== Chamber works ===
- Four Easy Dances for piano, "Music for a Children's Theatre": Puss in Boots, Red-Riding-Hood and Wolf, Butterfly, Dance of the Ducklings, for piano (1956/1957)
- Partita, Op. 2 for piano (1958)
- 2 Sonatinen Op. 1, for piano (1958/1959)
- Quintettino Op. 13, for wind quintet (1964)
- Collage über B-A-C-H for oboe and strings (1964)
- Trivium for organ (1976)
- Für Alina for piano (1976)
- Pari intervallo in four parts without fixed instrumentation (1976)
  - Version for organ (1980)
  - Version for four recorders (1980)
  - Version for clarinet, trombone and string orchestra (1995)
  - Version for saxophone quartet (2002)
  - Version for two pianos or piano duet (2008)
  - Version for 8 or 4 celli (2010)
- Variationen zur Gesundung von Arinuschka for piano (1977)
- Fratres (1977–1992)
  - Fratres for string quintet or wind quintet (original version)
  - Fratres for violin and piano; or cello and piano; or viola and piano
  - Fratres for string orchestra and percussion
  - Fratres for violin, string orchestra and percussion
  - Fratres for cello/viola/guitar/trombone, string orchestra and percussion
  - Fratres for string quartet
  - Fratres for four percussionists
  - Fratres for 4, 8 or 12 cellos
  - Fratres for three recorder players, cello (or viola da gamba) and percussion
  - Fratres for wind octet and percussion
  - Fratres for chamber ensemble
- Spiegel im Spiegel (1978–2011)
  - for violin or viola or cello and piano (1978)
  - for clarinet or bass clarinet or horn and piano (2003)
  - for double bass and piano (2005)
  - for alto flute, oboe or cor anglais and piano (2007)
  - for bassoon and piano (2009)
  - for organ and piano (2010)
  - for baritone saxophone and piano (2011)
- Annum per annum for organ (1980)
- Hymn to a Great City for two pianos (1984/2000)
- Festina lente for string section and harp (1988)
- Mein Weg hat Gipfel und Wellentäler for organ (1989)
- Summa (1990–2010)
  - for string quartet (1990)
  - for recorder quartet (2005)
  - for trombone quartet (2008)
  - for saxophone quartet (2009)
  - for guitar quartet, cello quartet or cello octet (2010)
  - for 2 guitars (2011)
- Psalom for string quartet (1991/1993), for 8 celli (2010)
- Mozart-Adagio for violin, cello and piano (1992/1997), for clarinet, cello and piano (2017) from Mozart's Piano Sonata in F major, K. 280
- Passacaglia for violin and piano (2003)
- Für Anna Maria for piano (2006)
- Estländler for flute (2006) or violin (2009)
- Scala cromatica for violin, cello and piano (2007)
- O-Antiphonen for 8 celli (2008)
- Solfeggio for string quartet or saxophone quartet (2008), for 4 or 8 cellos (2010)
- Missa brevis for 12 cellos (2009) or 8 celli (2010)
- Ukuaru Waltz for piano (2010), for accordion (2016) from film score for Ukuaru (1973)
- Da pacem Domine for 4 or 8 celli (2010)
- Kyrie eleison for bells of the Rakvere Church of the Trinity (2010)
- Silouan's Song for 8 celli (2012)
- Nunc Dimittis for 9 saxophones (2016)
- Estonian Lullaby for violin and piano (2019)
- Vater unser for saxophone quartet (2019)

== Selected discography ==
- Tabula Rasa (ECM New Series, CD/LP 1984)
- Arbos (ECM New Series, CD/LP 1987)
- Passio (ECM New Series, CD/LP 1988)
- Miserere (ECM New Series, CD/LP 1991)
- Te Deum (ECM New Series, CD/LP 1993)
- Collage (Chandos Records, CD 1993)
- Litany (ECM New Series, CD/LP 1996)
- Beatus (Virgin Classics/EMI, CD 1997)
- De Profundis (Harmonia Mundi, CD)
- Kanon Pokajanen (ECM New Series, 2xCD 1998)
- Sanctuary (Virgin Classics/EMI, CD 1998)
- I Am The True Vine (Harmonia Mundi, CD 1999)
- Alina (ECM New Series, 1999)
- Orchestral Works (Naxos, CD 2000)
- Te Deum (Deutsche Grammophon/Universal Classics, CD 2000)
- Orient & Occident (ECM New Series, CD 2002)
- Summa (Virgin Classics/EMI, CD 2002)
- Passio (Naxos, CD 2003)
- Triodion (Hyperion, CD 2003)
- Pro & Contra (Virgin Classics/EMI, CD 2004)
- Summa (Naxos, CD 2004)
- Arvo Pärt: A Portrait (Naxos, Compilation CD 2005)
- Lamentate (ECM New Series, 2005)
- Da Pacem (Harmonia Mundi, CD 2006)
- Triodion • Ode VII • I Am The True Vine • Dopo La Vittoria (Naxos, CD 2006)
- Pilgrim's Song (Estonian Record Productions, CD 2009)
- In Principio (ECM New Series, CD 2009)
- Symphony No. 4 (ECM, New Series CD 2010)
- Cantique (Sony Classical Records, SACD 2010)
- Vater unser (Estonian Record Productions, CD 2011)
- Adam's Lament (ECM New Series 2012)
- The Symphonies (ECM New Series 2018)
- Tractus (ECM New Series 2023)
