= Concerto Grosso No. 1 (Schnittke) =

Composition by Alfred Schnittke

- by Alfred Schnittke
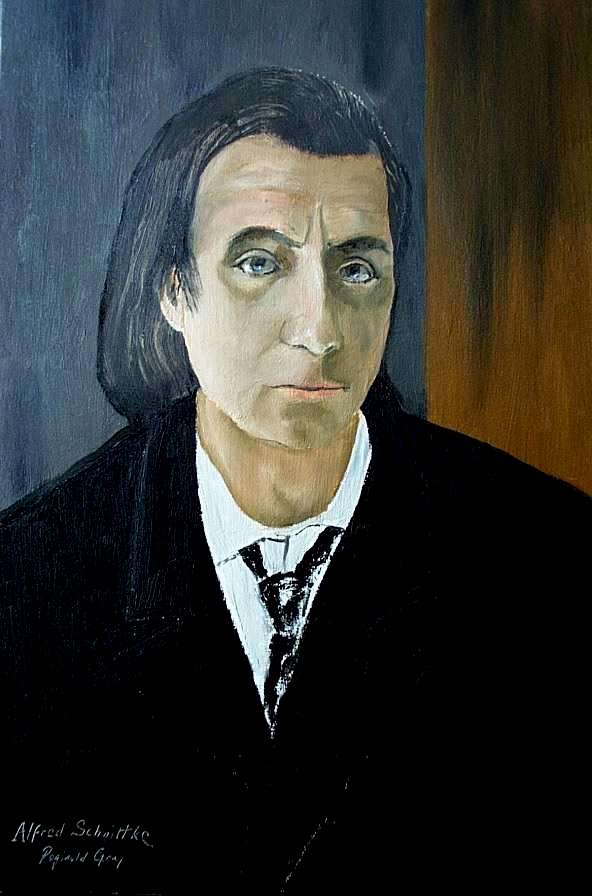
- Portrait of Alfred Schnittke by Reginald Gray (1972)
- Style: Polystylism
- Composed: 1976–1977
- Dedication: Gidon Kremer, Tatiana Grindenko, and Saulius Sondeckis
- Duration: about 28 minutes
- Movements: Six
- Scoring: two solo violins, string chamber orchestra, harpsichord, and prepared piano

Premiere
- Date: 21 March 1977
- Location: Leningrad
- Conductor: Eri Klas
- Performers: Gidon Kremer and Tatiana Grindenko (violins), Yuri Smirnov (keyboard instruments), and the Leningrad Chamber Orchestra

The Concerto Grosso No. 1 was the first of six concerti grossi by Soviet composer Alfred Schnittke. It was written in 1976–1977 at the request of Gidon Kremer and Tatiana Grindenko who were also the violin soloists at its premiere on 21 March 1977 in Leningrad together with Yuri Smirnov on keyboard instruments and the Leningrad Chamber Orchestra under Eri Klas. It is one of the best-known of Schnittke's polystylistic compositions and marked his break-through in the West.

== History ==
In May 1976, Gidon Kremer and Tatiana Grindenko asked Schnittke to compose a work for them and the Lithuanian Chamber Orchestra under the conductor Saulius Sondeckis to be performed several times in 1977 and recorded. It was Kremer who came up with the idea of a concerto grosso. The score was ready by the end of 1976, and the piece was premiered on 21 March 1977 under the baton of Estonian conductor Eri Klas, a mutual friend of both Kremer and Schnittke, together with the Leningrad Chamber Orchestra. After the premiere, Schnittke made several cuts in the score, and subsequent performances of the final version followed in Vilnius, Moscow, Riga, Tallinn and Budapest.

Schnittke was at the time not allowed to travel outside the Eastern Bloc. Kremer was therefore to invite Schnittke to serve as a harpsichordist in the Lithuanian Chamber Orchestra on its tour to Austria and Germany the same year. Schnittke was therefore able to attend the premiere of his piece in the West. During the Salzburg Festival in August 1977, Kremer and Grindenko recorded the piece for Eurodisc together with the London Symphony Orchestra under Gennady Rozhdestvensky. When the LP recording was released in 1978 the Concerto Grosso was coupled with Sibelius's Violin Concerto.

In 1988, at the request of the Russian oboist Viacheslav Lupachev, Schnittke made a new version of the Concerto Grosso, with flute and oboe (alternatively two flutes) replacing the two violins. The first recording of this version was made in 2008 by flutist Sharon Bezaly and oboist Christopher Cowie together with the Cape Town Philharmonic Orchestra under the baton of Owain Arwel Hughes for BIS.

== Structure ==
The work is scored for two solo violins, a string chamber orchestra consisting of 6 first violins, 6 second violins, 4 violas, 4 cellos and 2 double bass, a harpsichord and a prepared piano. The two keyboard instruments are meant to be played by one player. The piano is prepared by inserted coins between the strings in its upper register as well as being electrically amplified creating a ‘church bell’ sound.

The piece consists of six movements:

1. Preludio (Andante)
2. Toccata (Allegro)
3. Recitativo (Lento)
4. Cadenza
5. Rondo (Agitato)
6. Postludio (Andante)

A typical performance lasts for approximately 28 minutes.

The work is dedicated to Gidon Kremer, Tatiana Grindenko and Saulius Sondeckis. It is published by Sikorski.

== Music ==
Schnittke builds his Concerto Grosso No. 1 on the Baroque idea of intensive dialogue between the orchestra and soloists. The instrumentation featuring two solo violins against a relatively small string section and harpsichord compares well to the Baroque concerto grossos of Corelli and others. But according to some scholars it was never Schnittke's intention to write a ‘real’ concerto grosso or a pastiche, rather to make his commentary on the idea of a Baroque concerto grosso.

The piece is representative of polystylism and the use of quotations which Schnittke employed during this period. Schnittke addressed the issue of combining different styles in the program notes to the Viennese audience in 1977:

I dream of the Utopia of a united style, where fragments of ‘U’ (Unterhaltung) [entertaining] and ‘E’ (Ernst) [serious] are not used for comic effect but seriously represent multi-faceted musical reality. That’s why I’ve decided to put together some fragments from my cartoon film music: a joyful childeren’s chorus, a nostalgic atonal serenade, a piece of hundred-percent-guaranteed Correlli (Made in the USSR), and finally, my grandmother’s favourite tango played by my great-grandmother on a harpsichord. I am sure all these themes go together very well, and I use them absolutely seriously.

Schnittke's desire is first and foremost to combine apparently irreconcilable idioms, in his case 'popular' (or 'banal') styles like tangos with serious styles like atonal music and quasi-Baroque music. Because he does not think that a synthesis of popular and classical styles is possible, he calls it a ‘pure utopia’, yet that never prevented him from attempting.

There are numerous references to Schnittke's film music in the piece (Schnittke wrote music to more than 60 films). For instance, the monogram 'B–A–C–H' comes from his music for an animated film called The Glass Harmonica (1968). The tango melody in the rondo was first heard in the film The Agony (1974). The conclusion of the cadenza is taken from the animated film The Butterfly. The quasi-baroque tune at the opening of the rondo was originally a song (sung by the Russian actor-singer legend Vladimir Vysotsky) at the beginning of Schnittke's score for the film How Tsar Peter got the Black Man Married.

=== I. Preludio ===
The first movement Preludio, marked Andante, starts with a nursery rhyme-type melody on prepared piano:

The main theme is then introduced by the two solo violins, calling to each other with intervals of minor seconds, and usually staying close to each other by the same intervallic distance:

After a soloistic passage in the two violins followed by the violas slither down their strings to a bottom pedal, note the second idea begins. A violin solo explores a melody in the bottom of its register followed by the second solo violin:

The nursery rhyme melody is then reintroduced in the harpsichord. After a climax in tutti strings, the movement ends with the two solo violins in a variant of the main theme.

=== II. Toccata ===
The second movement Toccata, marked Allegro, is a diabolical parody of Vivaldi overstuffed with strict and stretto canons. The soloists starts the movement but are gradually joined by the rest of the strings until the movement reaches a state of frenzy.

A second Vivaldian theme is then introduced by solo violins and harpsichord. Then follows an intensive dialogue between soloists and orchestra. The tension builds up until the orchestra ends up on a tone cluster. The tone cluster is cut off and a waltz melody is being introduced by solo violins and harpsichord:

The waltz melody is based on all 12 notes in the scale starting with the B–A–C–H motif.

=== III. Recitativo ===
After a short rest for breath, the orchestra begins the third movement, a funeral Recitativo marked Lento. The intervals of minor and major seconds dominate the discourse, recalling the prelude. Everything is tightly controlled until the soloists begin to produce larger intervals and wild glissandi runs; an uncontrollable climax is reached and with feverish pitch the orchestra slowly creeps to their highest register until reaching a piercing shriek.

=== IV. Cadenza ===
The two violin soloists follow up with a passionate Cadenza movement that work up to a point of frenzy. The sudden appearance of a Purcellian motif leads directly into the next movement.

=== V. Rondo ===
The main theme of the fifth movement Rondo, marked Agitato, has a Vivaldian character while referring unmistakably to Johannes Brahms's Hungarian Dance No. 5 and is exchanged between the two violin soloists in quasi-canonic fashion with agitated accompaniment from the orchestra:

In the second episode, the harpsichord establishes a new theme in the form of a tango subsequently taken over by the orchestra:

After a struggle between the soloists and orchestra, the movement culminates in a passage of pathos, after which the tempo changes to Andante and the nursery rhyme melody in the piano is once more heard.

=== VI. Postludio ===
Without any pause, the Postludio is reached, completing a full cycle as the soloists play their minor seconds theme from the first movement.

== Discography ==
Tatiana Grindenko (violin), Gidon Kremer (violin) / London Symphony Orchestra / Gennady Rozhdestvensky (conductor; harpsichord and piano) (recorded 8/1977)

Eurodisc, Melodiya 25099 MK (LP, 1978) (+ Sibelius: Violin Concerto)
Eurodisc: 913224 (LP/Quad, 1978) (+ Sibelius: Violin Concerto)
Melodiya 33 С 10—13135-6 (LP, 1979) (+ Sibelius: Violin Concerto)
RCA VICTOR Gold Seal 09026-60957-2 (CD, 1992) (+ Sibelius: Violin Concerto)
Sonocord 35145 2 (SACD/Club/RM/Gol, 2004) (+ Sibelius: Violin Concerto)
Denon COCO-73298 (CD, 2012) (+ Sibelius: Violin Concerto)

Liana Isakadze (violin), Oleh Krysa (violin), Natalia Mandenova (harpsichord), Alfred Schnittke (piano)/ Georgian Chamber Orchestra / Saulius Sondeckis (conductor) (recorded 1983)

Melodiya C10 21225 004 (LP/RP, 1987) (+ Mendelssohn: String Symphony No. 9)
Melodiya B00QW43FJQ (Download, 2014) (+ Mendelssohn: String Symphony No. 9)

Christian Bergqvist (violin), Patrik Swedrup (violin), Roland Pöntinen (harpsichord/piano) / New Stockholm Chamber Orchestra / Lev Markiz (conductor) (recorded 20–22 August 1987)

BIS Records BIS-377 (CD, 1987) (+ Schnittke: Concerto for Oboe and Harp, Concerto for Piano and Strings)

Tatiana Grindenko (violin), Gidon Kremer (violin) / Moscow Philharmonic Soloists Ensemble / Yuri Bashmet (conductor) (live recording 5/1988)

Melodiya А10 00625 004 (LP, 1990) (+ Martynov: Come In!)
Melodiya SUCD 10-00067 (CD, 1990) (+ Schnittke: Concerto for Cello and Orchestra)
GRAMZAPIS B0049H5VR2 (CD, 1990) (+ Schnittke: Concerto for Cello and Orchestra)
Col Legno WWE 1CD 20510 (CD, 2000) (+ Schnittke: "Prelude in Memoriam Dmitri Shostakovich", Trio Sonata, Two Short Pieces for Organ)
Alto ALC1341 (CD, 2017) (+ Schnittke: Concerto Grosso No. 2)

Tatiana Grindenko (violin), Gidon Kremer (violin), Yuri Smirnov (harpsichord/piano) / Chamber Orchestra of Europe / Heinrich Schiff (conductor) (live recording 9/1988)

Deutsche Grammophon 429 413-2 (CD, 1990) (+ Schnittke: "Quasi una sonata", "Moz-Art à la Haydn")
Deutsche Grammophon 0289 471 6262 9 GH (CD, 1992) (+ Schnittke: Concerto Grosso No. 5, "Quasi una sonata")
Deutsche Grammophon 445 520-2 (CD, 1994) (+ Schnittke: "Quasi una sonata", "Moz-Art à la Haydn", "A Paganini")
Deutsche Grammophon 439 452-2 (CD, 1994) (+ Ligeti: Kammerkonzert, Lutosławski: "Chain 3", "Novelette")

Michael Dauth (violin), Pavel Bogacz (violin) / Orchestra Ensemble Kanazawa / Hiroyuki Iwaki (conductor) (recorded 4/1992)

Deutsche Grammophon POCG-1576 (CD, 1994) (+ Shchedrin: Carmen-Suite)

Eleonora Turovsky (violin), Natalya Turovsky (violin), Catherine Perrin (harpsichord/piano) / I Musici de Montreal / Yuli Turovsky (conductor) (recorded 8/1996)

Chandos Classics CHAN 9590 (CD, 1997) (+ Pärt: Tabula rasa; Górecki: Harpsichord Concerto)

Marco Serino (violin), Ludovico Tramma (violin) / Ensemble Il Terzo Suono / Flavio Emilio Scogna (conductor) (recorded 11/1995 and 06/1998)

Dynamic 2030 (CD, 2000) (+ Schnittke: Sonata for violin & chamber orchestra, "Monologue" for viola and chamber orchestra)

Victor Kuleshov (violin), Ilya Yoff (violin), Julia Lev (harpsichord/piano) / St. Petersburg Mozarteum Chamber Orchestra / Arcady Shteinlukht (conductor) (recorded 2004?)

Manchester Files CDMAN175 (CD, 2004) (+ Schnittke: Concerto for Piano and Strings)

Sharon Bezaly (flute), Christopher Cowie (oboe), Grant Brasler (harpsichord), Albert Combrink (piano) / Cape Town Philharmonic Orchestra / Owain Arwel Hughes (conductor) (recorded 12/2008)

BIS Records BIS-CD-1727 (CD, 2009) (+ Schnittke: Symphony No. 9)

Maria Alikhanova (flute), Dmitri Bulgakov (oboe) / Chamber Orchestra Kremlin / Misha Rachlevsky (conductor) (recorded 2011?)

Quartz Music QTZ2083 (CD, 2011) (+ J.S. Bach: Concerto for 2 Violins and Strings, arr. for flute, oboe and strings; Schnittke: "Moz-art à la Haydn" for 2 Violins and Strings, arr. for flute, oboe and strings)

== Notes and references ==
Notes

Citations

Sources

- Colon-Hernandez, Edgar (2007-07-02). "Alfred Harrievich Schnittke (1934-1998): Concerto Grosso No. 1".
- Ivashkin, Alexander (1996). Alfred Schnittke. London: Phaidon Press Limited. ISBN 0-7148-3169-7.
- Ivashkin, Alexander (2009). Schnittke – Concerto grosso No.1 & Symphony No.9 (PDF) (Booklet). Sharon Bezaly (fl), Christopher Cowie (ob), Cape Town Philharmonic Orchestra and Owain Arwel Hughes (cond.). Åkersberga: BIS records. BIS-CD-1727.
- Schnittke, Alfred (2002). "Chapter 3: On Concerto Grosso No. 1 (Late 1970s)". In Ivashkin, Alexander (ed.). A Schnittke Reader. Bloomington, Indiana: Indiana University Press. ISBN 0-253-33818-2.
- Tremblay, Jean-Benoît (2007). Polystylism and Narrative Potential in the Music of Alfred Schnittke (Ph.D.). University of British Columbia.
