= Tabula Rasa (Pärt) =

1977 musical composition by Arvo Pärt

- Concerto by Arvo Pärt
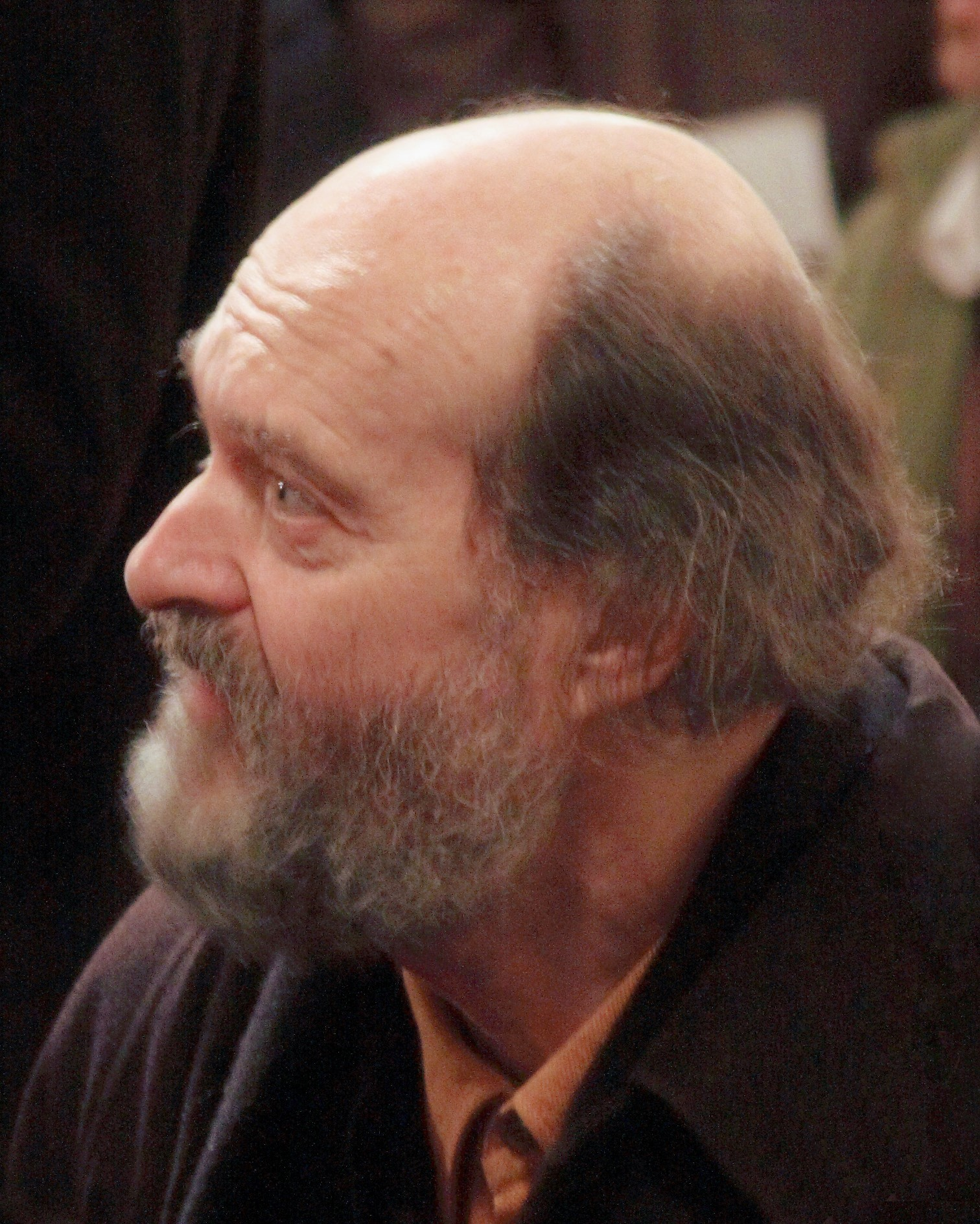
- The composer in 2008
- Composed: 1977
- Dedication: Gidon Kremer
- Movements: two
- Scoring: 2 solo violins (or violin and viola); prepared piano; chamber orchestra

Premiere
- Date: 30 September 1977
- Location: Tallinn
- Conductor: Eri Klas
- Performers: Gidon Kremer, Tatjana Grindenko, Alfred Schnittke, Tallinn Chamber Orchestra

Tabula Rasa is a musical composition written in 1977 by the Estonian composer Arvo Pärt. The piece contains two movements, "Ludus" and "Silentium," and is a double concerto for two solo violins, prepared piano, and chamber orchestra.

== History ==
In 1968, Arvo Pärt fell publicly silent and entered a period of “artistic reorientation.” During this period, he developed his tintinnabuli style of composition, which pairs two voices, one playing the notes of a scale (Melodic Voice), and the other playing notes of a triad (Tintinnabuli Voice). Pärt emerged from this period of innovation in 1976, and composed many of his most well known works, including Fratres, Cantus in Memory of Benjamin Britten, and Summa, all written in the tintinnabuli style. Tabula Rasa is one of these earliest tintinnabuli pieces, and holds the distinction of being one of the first compositions of Pärt's to reach Western listeners outside of Estonia and the Soviet States.

=== Composition and première ===
Tabula Rasa was composed at the request of Eri Klas, a friend and conductor, who asked Pärt to write a piece to accompany Alfred Schnittke’s Concerto Grosso No. 1, which was scored for two violins, prepared piano, harpsichord, and string chamber ensemble, for an upcoming concert. The piece is dedicated to violinist Gidon Kremer. Kremer premièred the piece in Tallinn, Estonia, on 30 September 1977, with Tatjana Grindenko, on solo second violin, Alfred Schnittke on the prepared piano, and the Tallinn Chamber Orchestra, conducted by Eri Klas.

=== Editions ===
Pärt released two versions of Tabula Rasa in 1977. The first is scored for two solo violins, prepared piano, and string chamber orchestra. The second is scored for solo violin and solo viola, prepared piano, and string chamber orchestra.

=== Recording ===
In 1984, ECM Records, under the direction of producer Manfred Eicher, released its first recording of Pärt's music, titled Tabula Rasa, which featured performers Gidon Kremer, Tatjana Grindenko, Keith Jarrett, Alfred Schnittke, with the Lithuanian Chamber Orchestra, conducted by Saulius Sondeckis. This recording was the first of Pärt's long collaboration with Eicher and ECM. Another recording is on the EMI Classics label, with Tasmin Little as the soloist, Martin Roscoe on piano, and the Bournemouth Sinfonietta, conducted by Richard Studt, who also plays the second violin.

== Instrumentation ==
Tabula Rasa is scored for two solo violins (or one solo violin and one viola), prepared piano, and string chamber orchestra (Violin I and II, Viola, Cello, Contrabass).

The score indicates the notes to be prepared on the piano, and states, "Das Klavier soll nach Möglichkeit elektrisch verstärkt werden," which translates to, "The piano should be amplified if possible."

== Form ==
=== Ludus ===
The first movement of Tabula Rasa is entitled "Ludus," which means "game" in Latin. The movement contains alternating moments of silence and expanding canon variations, a cadenza, and a final meno mosso. The movement begins with the two solo violins playing a ff octave "A," followed by an eight beat grand pause (G.P.). This octave highlights the large four-octave pitch range on the violin, with violin II playing A3, and violin I playing A7.

The string orchestra enters in pairs after the G.P. in the first "variation" on the pitch, "A." Pärt phases in each of the string instruments in pairs, violin I in two parts, violin II and viola, cello and contrabass. The pairs enter from highest to lowest pitch range every half measure, beginning with the first violins. Pärt divides each pair into a melodic and tintinnabuli voice. The melodic voice plays the notes of the A minor scale, and the tintinnabuli voice plays the notes of the A minor triad. When the cello and contrabass finish their melodic figure, the contrabass continues playing a pedal note "A," until in mm. 6, when the pattern reverses, and again the instrument sections are phased in, displaced by a half measure, but this time beginning with the lowest instrument pair (cello and contrabass). The string orchestra's phasing pattern is reflected in the solo violin parts. When the orchestra is phasing in each part from highest pitch range to lowest, the solo violin plays an eighth note melody, when the solo bass line is played, the solo parts switch and play triplets, and when the chamber orchestra reverses the pattern and phase in again from the lowest pitch range to highest, the solo violin line plays sixteenth notes. After the chamber orchestra finishes, one of the solo violins and the prepared piano play together, followed by a grand pause of seven beats.

Pärt takes this variation pattern and expands upon it eight times, each time lengthening the melodic figure in the string orchestra parts by two beats. The variations increase in length from 8 measures, to 13, 17, 22, 26, 31 and 35, before the final variation. While the variations increase in length, Pärt also adds a new pitch or pitches to each variation until all the pitches in the A minor scale are represented in the fourth variation. The variations become increasingly close together as Pärt decreases the length of the G.P. after each variation by one beat. In variation eight, Pärt does not leave any silence, and instead writes a cadenza for all of the instruments. In the cadenza, the solo violins and prepared piano play ff arppegiated chords, while the string orchestra sections play a three-octave descending scale, beginning on “E.” The cadenza lasts 22 measures, until the piano plays the first accidental of the movement, F♯, signaling the beginning of the final section, meno mosso.

The meno mosso is divided into two-bar phrases. The string orchestra plays a divided chord in steady quarter notes, while the solo violins arpeggiate notes of the chord in sixteenth notes above. Each time the key changes in the orchestra, the piano punctuates the texture with an A minor chord in both hands. The meno mosso works its way back to the key of A minor through several chords, beginning with a diminished F♯ minor chord. When the soloists and orchestra finally reach the A minor chord, the soloists play the opening ff “A” octave, followed by four measures of silence in which the chamber orchestra plays a triple forte A minor chord.

=== Silentium ===
The second movement of Tabula Rasa, “Silentium,” or silence, is composed in the key of D minor, giving the impression of a V-I cadence in relation to "Ludus" in A minor. The movement begins with an arpeggiated D minor second inversion chord, played by the prepared piano. “Silentium” expands as a mensuration canon. Pärt divides the instruments into three sections; solo violins, violin I and violin II, and viola and cello. Each pair, divided into melodic and tintinnabuli voices, begin on a central pitch, and move at a different rhythmic speeds. Pärt expands the music by adding one pitch above and below the central pitch of each pair in each successive section. Every time the solo violins reach their central pitch, “D,” the piano again plays a D minor chord and the contrabass plays an octave “D.” Once each of the sections reach their expanded octave range, they fade out of the texture. The solo violins, moving at the slowest rhythmic speed, reach their octave span in measure 130, and then begin a downward descent of a D minor four-octave scale. As the violins move down the scale, the lower voices return to the texture and assist in the downward motion, until the violins finish their scale, leaving solo viola, solo cello, and solo bass to continue the scale in their low register. The viola and the cello finish the scale, leaving only the contrabass, which continues to play until reaching “E,” or the second scale degree of the D minor scale. Pärt omits the final “D” of the scale, leaving the listener with four written bars of silence in which to resolve the piece.

== Reception and influence ==
=== Notable performances ===
The first performance of Tabula Rasa in Tallinn 1977 was considered to be a major success. The composer Erkki-Sven Tüür, said about the performance: "I was carried beyond. I had the feeling that eternity was touching me through this music...nobody wanted to start clapping."

=== Recording ===
In 1984, Arvo Pärt began his longtime collaboration with ECM and Manfred Eicher. “Tabula Rasa” was the title of the first ECM recording of Pärt's music released in 1984. The CD included Fratres (for violin and piano), Cantus in Memory of Benjamin Britten, Fratres (for twelve celli), and Tabula Rasa. The liner notes for “Tabula Rasa,” written by Wolfgang Sandler, set the tone for Pärt's marketing as a “holy minimalist.” The photographs of Pärt depict him as an icon-like figure, reflecting his Orthodox Christian beliefs and influences. The simplicity and minimal design of the packaging set the tone for all subsequent releases of Pärt's music with ECM.

=== Palliative care ===
In an article in The New Yorker in December 2002, music critic Alex Ross discussed the use of Tabula Rasa in palliative care for AIDS and cancer patients facing the end of their disease. One caretaker reported having been asked by a dying patient to play the "angel music," referring to the second movement of Tabula Rasa, "Silentium."
