= Symphony No. 3 (Pärt) =

1971 musical composition by Arvo Pärt

- by Arvo Pärt
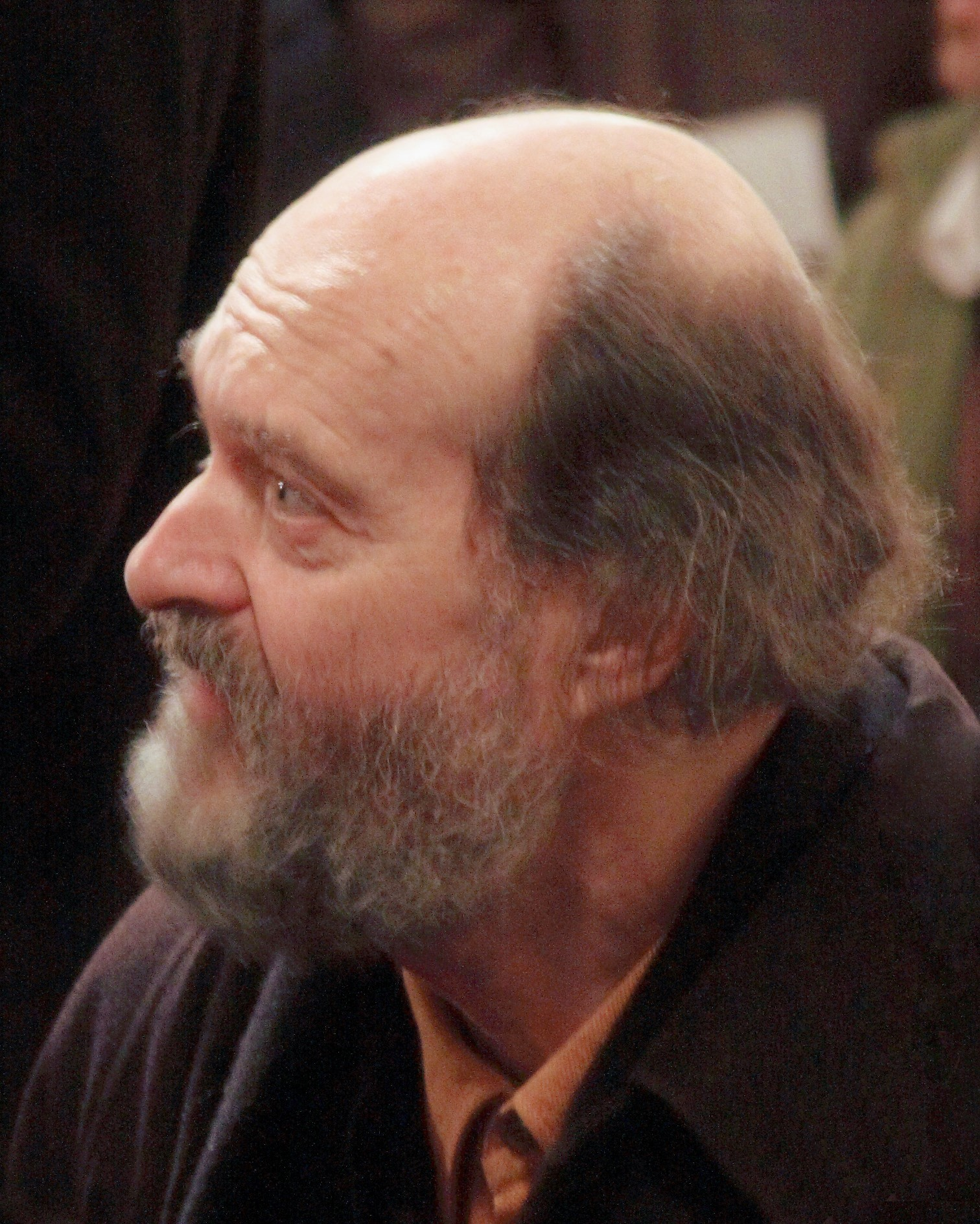
- Arvo Pärt
- Composed: 1971
- Performed: September 21, 1972 - Tallinn
- Published: Edition Peters
- Movements: 3
- Scoring: Symphony orchestra

Arvo Pärt composed his Third Symphony in 1971. It is scored for symphony orchestra and was dedicated to Neeme Järvi.

== Composition ==
After composing his Credo in 1968, he embarked on a transitional period where he stopped composing. The reason for this creative hiatus was Pärt's realization that his musical compositional method had been fully developed. The only major piece he decided to work on was the third symphony, which came about right before the creation of his unique tintinnabular style. During the years between 1968 and the creation of both Fratres and Tabula Rasa, Pärt delved into Gregorian chant, early polyphonic music and polyphony from the Renaissance period, from which he found much inspiration for this symphony. By doing this, he rejected the serialist musical style he pioneered and advocated in Estonia and turned to a much denser, minimalistic musical language. Pärt finally completed the symphony in 1971 and premiered it at the Estonia Concert Hall in Tallinn on 21 September 1972, with the dedicatee, Estonian conductor Neeme Järvi, conducting the Estonian National Symphony Orchestra.

Pärt described this symphony later as a "joyous work" and stated that it was not "the end of my despair and search".

== Structure ==
The symphony is divided into three untitled movements, played without pause. The total duration of the symphony is approximately 21 minutes. The movement list is as follows:

1. ( = 66)
2. ( = 54–56)
3. ( = 60)

The symphony is scored for a symphony orchestra consisting of two flutes, one piccolo, three oboes, three clarinets in B♭, one bass clarinet in B♭, two bassoons, one contrabassoon, four horns in F, four trumpets in B♭, four trombones, one tuba, timpani, one celesta, bells, one marimba, tam-tam and a full string section. This symphony clearly displays the composer's preoccupation with monody and early polyphony, which is characteristic of this transitional period, but was different from his earlier periods. He uses harmonic and melodic material that attempts to resemble choir music from the 14th and 15th century, even though no quotations are used anywhere in the piece.

The symphony starts with a slow melody played by both oboes and clarinets and swiftly modulates to G-sharp minor. The first movement, consisting of 142 bars, is the shortest in the symphony, which is meant to be played slowly and attacca. The second movement starts with a different melody played by a bassoon and the cellos and, after reaching a climax which is followed by a transitional section, has a solo section by the timpani which are supposed to speed up timpani beats to end with a tremolo, which leads to the third movement. The second movement has 147 bars in total. Finally, the alla breve third movement puts an end to the symphony. This is the longest movement in the symphony, consisting of 275 bars.

== Notable recordings ==
The following is a list of notable performances of this composition:

Conductor	Orchestra	Year of Recording	Format
Neeme Järvi	Bamberg Symphony Orchestra	1989	CD
Neeme Järvi	Gothenburg Symphony Orchestra	1999	CD
Takuo Yuasa	Ulster Orchestra	1999	CD
Paavo Järvi	Estonian National Symphony Orchestra	2000	CD
Kristjan Järvi	Berlin Radio Symphony Orchestra	2010	CD
Tõnu Kaljuste	NFM Wroclaw Philharmonic Orchestra	2015	CD
