= Oregon Repertory Singers =

Mixed vocal ensemble in Oregon, US

The Oregon Repertory Singers (ORS) is a mixed vocal ensemble in Portland, Oregon, founded in 1974. The choir performs a wide range of works from all time periods and languages, although over the years a special emphasis has been placed on contemporary music of the Americas.

== Recordings ==
Since 1980, ORS has commissioned and/or debuted 20 new works by American artists. In October 1988, ORS completed a four compact disc contract with Koch International Classics to record new American music. These recordings include

- Berliner Messe by Arvo Pärt and Mass to St. Anthony by Lou Harrison
- Missa Gaia by Libby Larsen and Echoes Between the Silent Peaks by Stephen Paulus
- A collection of holiday music called The Glory of Christmas
- Fern Hill by John Corigliano

Other ORS recordings include a compact disc of Rachmaninoff's Vespers with members of the Moscow State Chamber Choir under Vladimir Minin.

In 1995, ORS was included, along with Chanticleer and The King's Singers, in a compact disc Christmas Around the Country, which was distributed nationally by National Public Radio. An excerpt from the 1995 Glory of Christmas concert broadcast on NPR's Performance Today was so well-received that two hour-long specials on ORS followed.

In 2018, ORS released "Shadows on the Stars" with Gothic Records, an album featuring the music of Pacific Northwest composers, including among others Morten Lauridsen. The album earned the group the America Prize in Choral Performance for the community chorus division.

== Directors ==
Following the retirement of thirty-five year veteran artistic director Gil Seeley, the ensemble has been headed by Ethan Sperry, Director of Choral Activities at Portland State University, since 2011.

== See also ==
- Culture of Portland, Oregon
