= Pari intervallo =

1976 musical composition by Arvo Pärt

- by Arvo Pärt
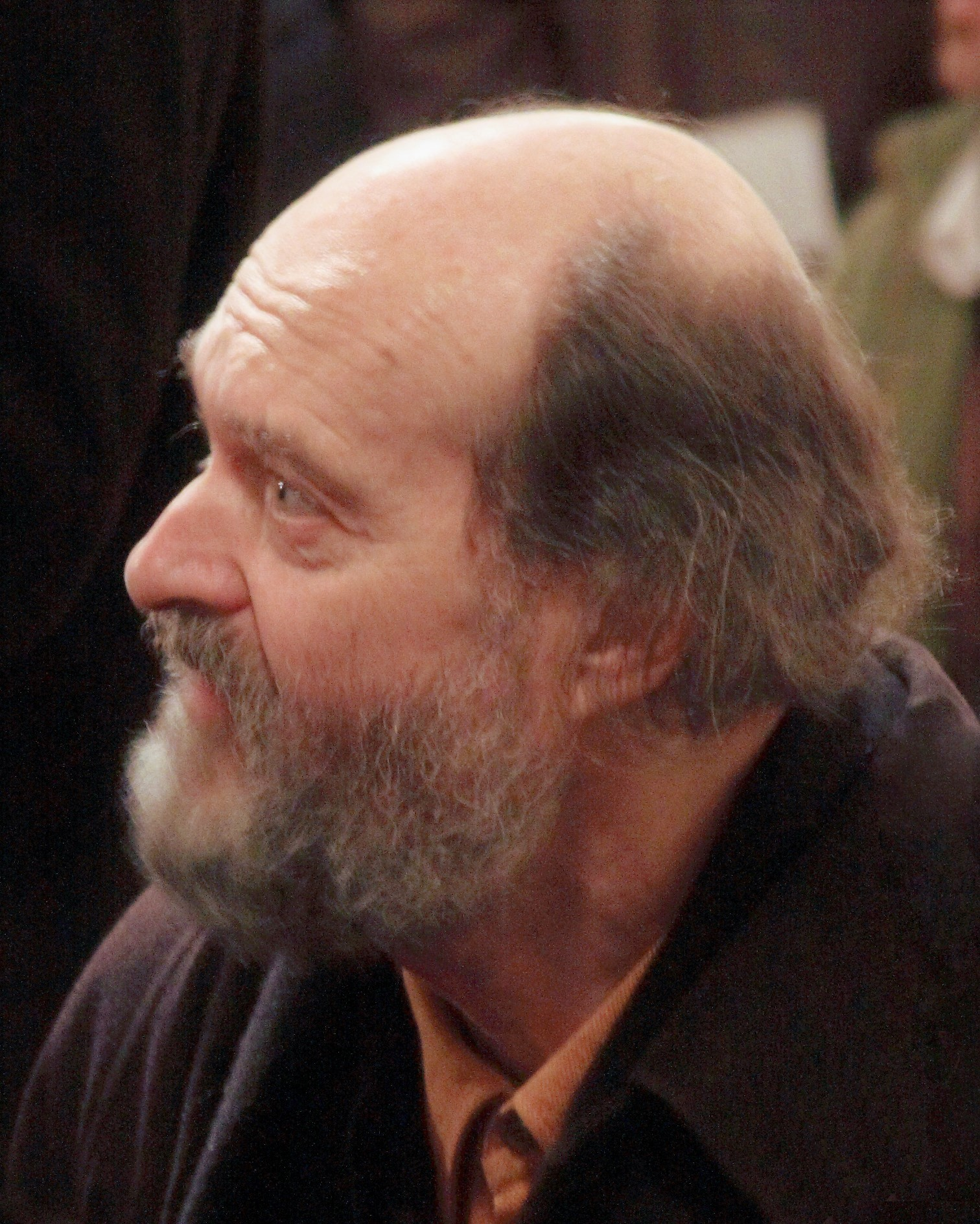
- The composer
- Style: Tintinnabuli
- Composed: 1976/1980

Pari intervallo is a composition by Estonian composer Arvo Pärt, written in 1976 in four parts without fixed instrumentation. The composer later made versions for organ (1980), four recorders (1980), clarinet, trombone and string orchestra (1995), saxophone quartet (2002), two pianos or piano duet (2008), and eight or four cellos (2010). Pari intervallo was one of seven works premiered in 1976 under the title tintinnabuli, the name of compositional style created by the composer.

== Structure ==
The work is in one movement and is approximately 6 minutes. It is in E♭ minor and consists of four voices; first and third playing only notes from E♭ minor chord and second and fourth (pedal bass) playing melody in parallel thirds (2 octaves apart).

== Organ stops ==
Notated organ stops in the score:

- Manual: zarter (soft) 8 ft (ev. Quintaton 8 ft, ev. + Trem.)
- Pedal: 16 ft (8 ft), Koppel (coupled)

== See also ==
- List of compositions by Arvo Pärt
