= The Beatitudes (Pärt) =

2001 musical composition by Arvo Pärt

- Sacred music for choir and organ by Arvo Pärt
- Text: Beatitudes
- Language: English
- Composed: 1990
- Performed: 2001: Edinburgh
- Scoring: SATB choir; organ

Arvo Pärt's The Beatitudes is a setting of Beatitudes from the Gospel of Matthew in English for mixed choir and organ, composed in 1990. It was published by Universal Edition.

== History ==
Arvo Pärt composed The Beatitudes' in 1990 on a commission of the broadcaster RIAS in Berlin and dedicated the setting to Hildegard Curth, a long-term music critic working for the station. The setting of the Beatitudes from the Sermon of the Mount as narrated in the Gospel of Matthew in the English of the King James Version of the Bible, with a concluding Amen. Pärt wrote it for mixed choir and organ. It was first performed on 25 May 1990 at the Nathanael-Church in Berlin by the Theatre of Voices conducted by Paul Hillier and the organist Christopher Bowers-Broadbent. It takes about seven minutes to perform. It was published by Universal Edition.

Pärt revised the work in 1991 and wrote a version in Latin in 2001, Beatitudines, which also included changes to the music. He dedicated this version to Giovanni Barzaghi and the Cappella Musicale of Monza Cathedral who premiered it with the organist Matteo Riboldi on 24 June 2002 at the church San Pietro Martire in Monza.

== Music ==
The Biblical text is recited in strict Homophony on a pedal point. The phrases are separated by general pauses. Each verse is rendered in a different key.
