= Symphony No. 1 (Pärt) =

Symphony by Arvo Pärt

- "Polyphonic"
- by Arvo Pärt
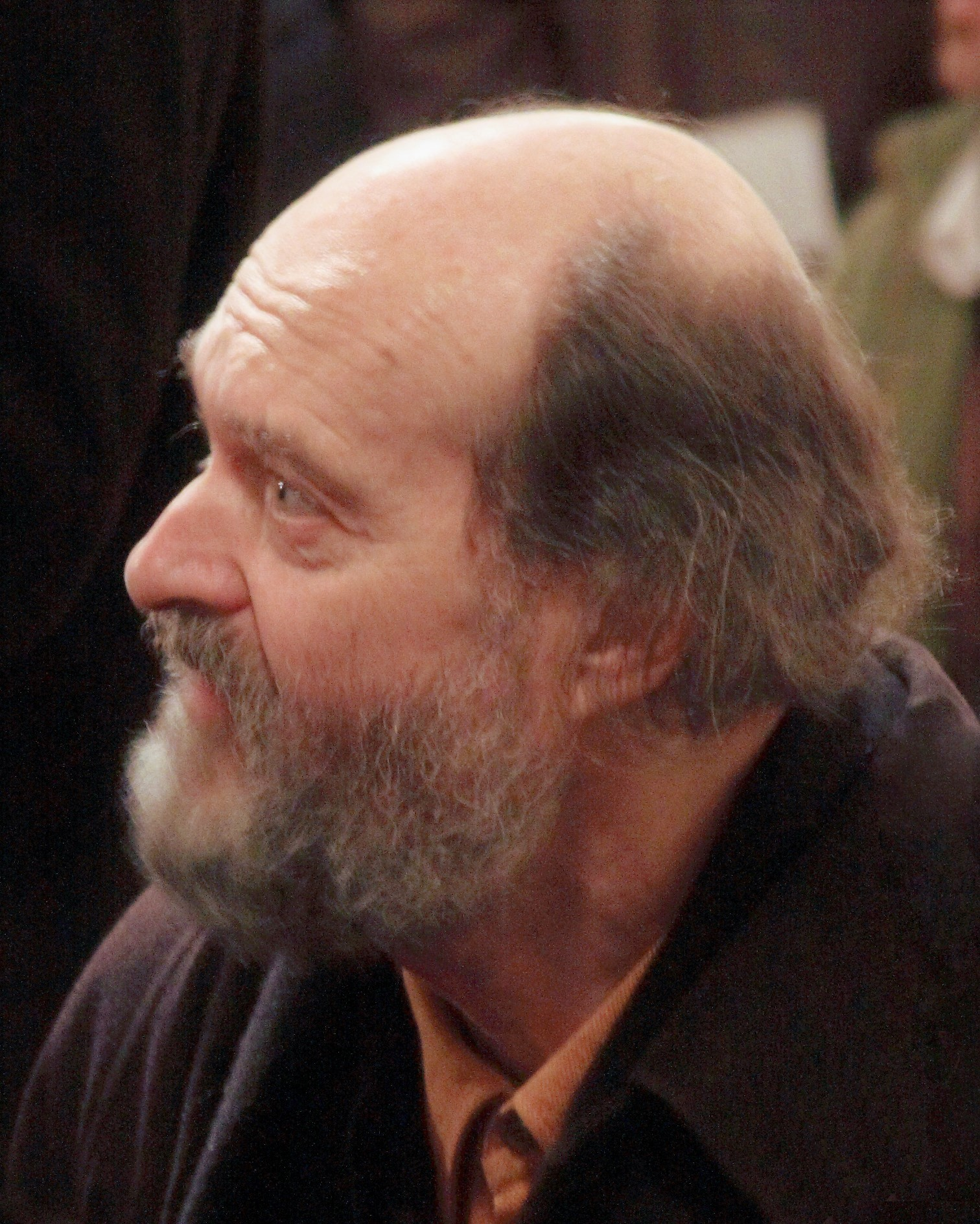
- Arvo Pärt
- Composed: 1963
- Performed: 7 February 1964, Tallinn
- Publisher: Hans Sikorski
- Duration: 16 min.
- Movements: 2

Symphony No. 1 "Polyphonic" is the first symphony by Estonian composer Arvo Pärt. The symphony was written in 1963. It is dedicated to Estonian composer Heino Eller.

The symphony has two main parts: canons and prelude plus fuga.

== Recordings ==
- Arvo Pärt, BIS (1989); Bamberg Symphony Orchestra, conductor Neeme Järvi
- Searching for roots, Virgin Classics (1997); Royal Stockholm Philharmonic Orchestra, conductor Paavo Järvi
- Pro & contra. Arvo Pärt, Virgin classics (2004); Estonian National Symphony Orchestra, conductor Paavo Järvi
- The Sound of Arvo Pärt, Parlophone, Warner (2015); Estonian National Symphony Orchestra, conductor Paavo Järvi
- Arvo Pärt. The Symphonies, ECM (2018); Wrocław NFM Philharmonic Orchestra, conductor Tõnu Kaljuste
