= Berliner Messe =

1990 musical composition by Arvo Pärt

- Mass by Arvo Pärt
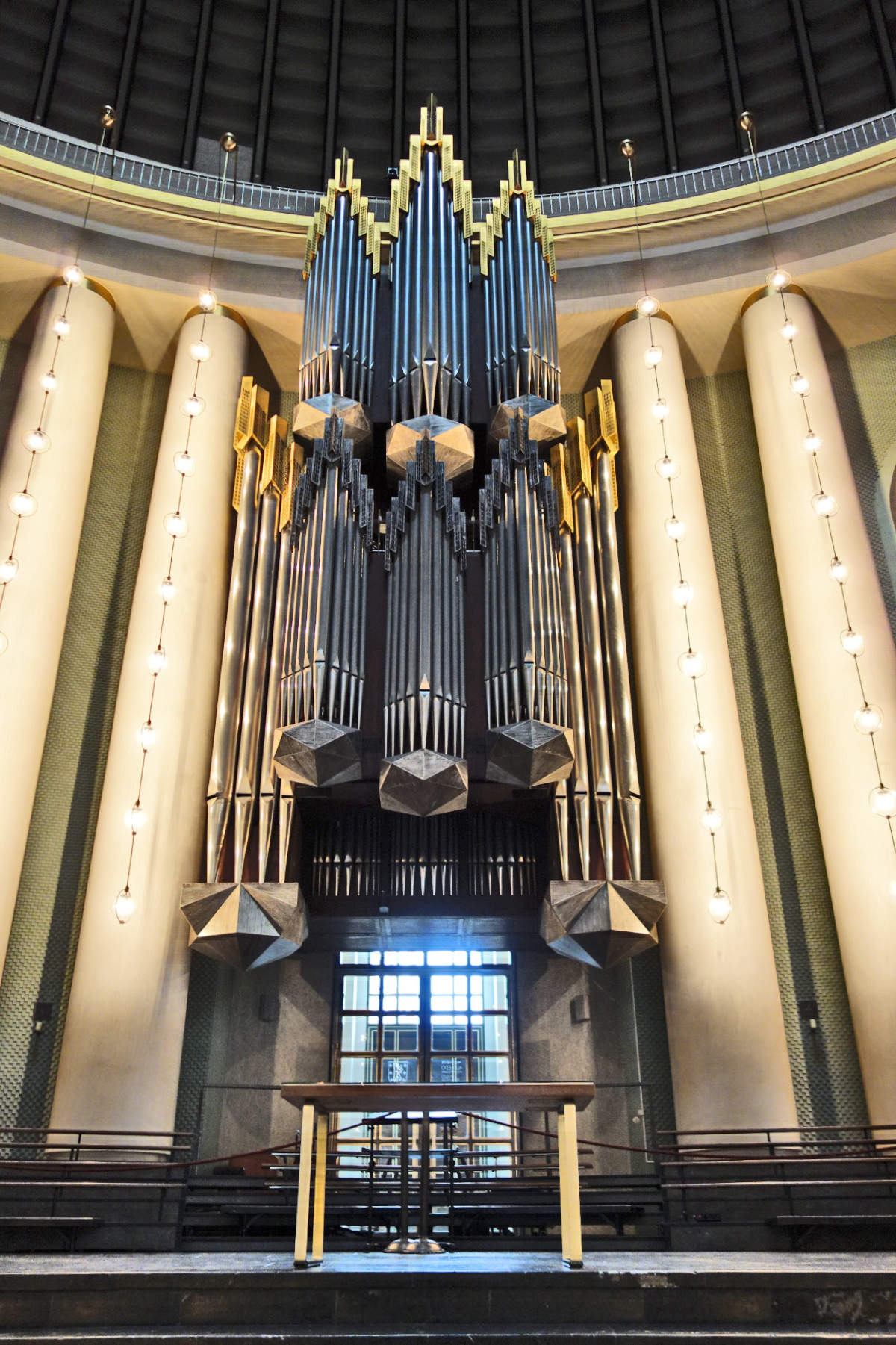
- The organ of St. Hedwig's Cathedral, where the mass was first performed
- Style: tintinnabuli
- Occasion: 90th Katholikentag in Berlin
- Text: Mass ordinary; Alleluja; Veni Sancte Spiritus
- Language: Latin
- Scoring: SATB choir and organ

Premiere
- Date: 24 May 1990
- Location: St. Hedwig's Cathedral, Berlin

Berliner Messe (or Berlin Mass) is a mass setting by Estonian composer Arvo Pärt. Commissioned for the 90th Katholikentag in Berlin in 1990, it was originally scored for SATB soloists and organ. It was first performed at St. Hedwig's Cathedral on 24 May 1990, the Feast of the Ascension, with Paul Hillier conducting the Theatre of Voices. Pärt later (1997) revised the piece for chorus and string orchestra. Pärt uses his tintinnabuli technique throughout, with movements taking many forms within that style—flowing from quietly reverent duets between parts to full chorus proclamations of faith.

== Structure ==
The work consists of five movements of the Mass ordinary and three movements intended for the celebration of Pentecost:

- Kyrie
- Gloria
- Erster Alleluiavers (First Alleluia)
- Zweiter Alleluiavers (Second Alleluia)
- Veni Sancte Spiritus
- Credo
- Sanctus
- Agnus Dei

The fact that the mass was originally written for Pentecost is evidenced by the presence of the two Alleluias and the Veni Sancte Spiritus. However, Pärt has also set two Alleluia verses to permit the work to be used at Christmas. All five of these movements are marked "ad lib." in the score.

== Recordings ==
- Estonian Philharmonic Chamber Choir, Tallinn Chamber Orchestra, dir. Tõnu Kaljuste (choir/string orchestra, 1993)
- Oregon Repertory Singers, dir. Gilbert Seeley (choir/organ, 1993)
- Polyphony, dir. Stephen Layton (choir/organ, 1998)
- Theatre of Voices, dir. Paul Hillier (soloists/organ, 2000)
- Elora Festival Singers, dir. Noel Edison (choir/string orchestra, 2004)
- Moscow Virtuosi, dir. Vladimir Spivakov (choir/string orchestra, 2004)
- Byrd Ensemble, dir. Markdavin Obenza (choir/organ, 2013)
- Choir of Leeds Cathedral, dir. Benjamin Saunders (choir/organ, 2015)

The Kyrie was featured in the film, Avengers: Age of Ultron.
