= Nunc dimittis (Pärt) =

2001 musical composition by Arvo Pärt

- Choral music by Arvo Pärt
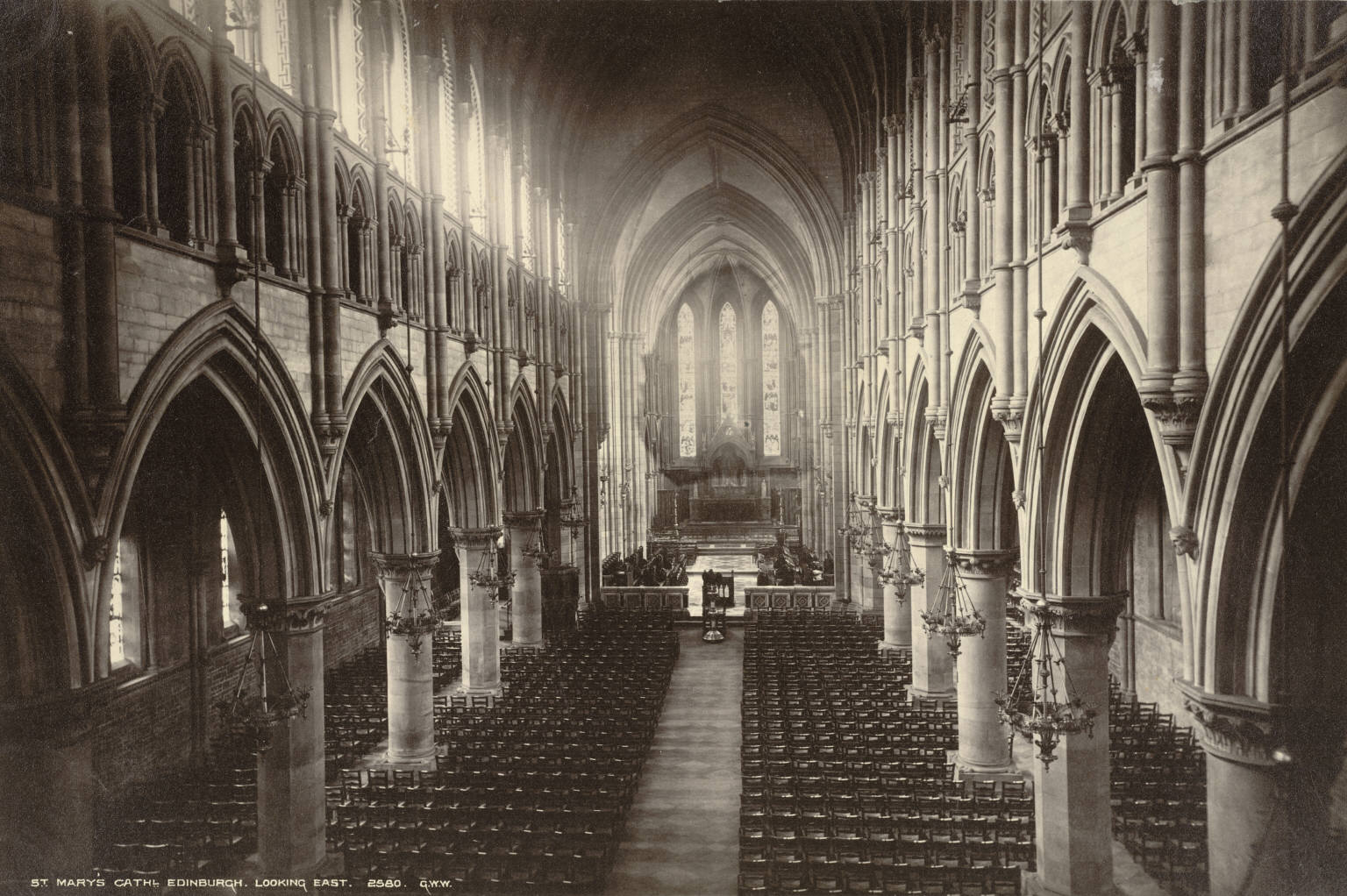
- Nave of St. Mary’s Cathedral in Edinburgh, for which the piece was composed
- Key: C-sharp minor
- Text: Nunc dimittis
- Language: Latin
- Composed: 2001
- Performed: 2001: Edinburgh
- Scoring: SATB choir

Arvo Pärt's Nunc dimittis is a setting of the Latin canticle Nunc dimittis for mixed choir a cappella, written in 2001. It was published by Universal Edition.

== History ==
The Latin canticle Nunc dimittis is based on the biblical narration of the Presentation of Jesus at the Temple according to the Gospel of Luke. It is one of only three canticles in the New Testament, along with the Magnificat and the Benedictus. It is part of the daily evening service compline and has often been set to music. In the English choral tradition, it is typically combined with a setting of the Magnificat for Vespers, colloquially called "Mag and Nunc".

Pärt had written a Magnificat in 1989 in Berlin, where the Estonian composer lived. Nunc dimittis was commissioned by the choir of St. Mary’s Cathedral in Edinburgh, conducted by Matthew Owens. They first performed it in an Evensong of the 2001 Edinburgh Festival. It was published by Universal Edition.

== Text and music ==
Pärt set the piece using the biblical text in the Vulgate version (Luke 2:29–32). He set it in C-sharp minor for a mixed choir a cappella. The climax, on the words "lumen ad revelationem" (a light to reveal), is prepared by a "measured procession of gradually expanding phrases" and happens shifting from C-sharp minor to C-sharp major. A reviewer noted that "gorgeous textures, harmonies and sonorities conjure a feeling of purity and emptiness."

== Recordings ==
The first recording of Nunc dimittis is part of Pärt: Triodion & other choral works, performed by Polyphony, conducted by Stephen Layton, and published by Hyperion. It was recorded in 2003 in the presence of the composer at London's Temple Church.

Nunc dimittis is part of a collection of music by Pärt titled Da Pacem, performed by the Estonian Philharmonic Chamber Choir, conducted by Paul Hillier, with organist Christopher Bowers-Broadbent.
