= Symphony No. 2 (Pärt) =

Symphony by Arvo Pärt

- by Arvo Pärt
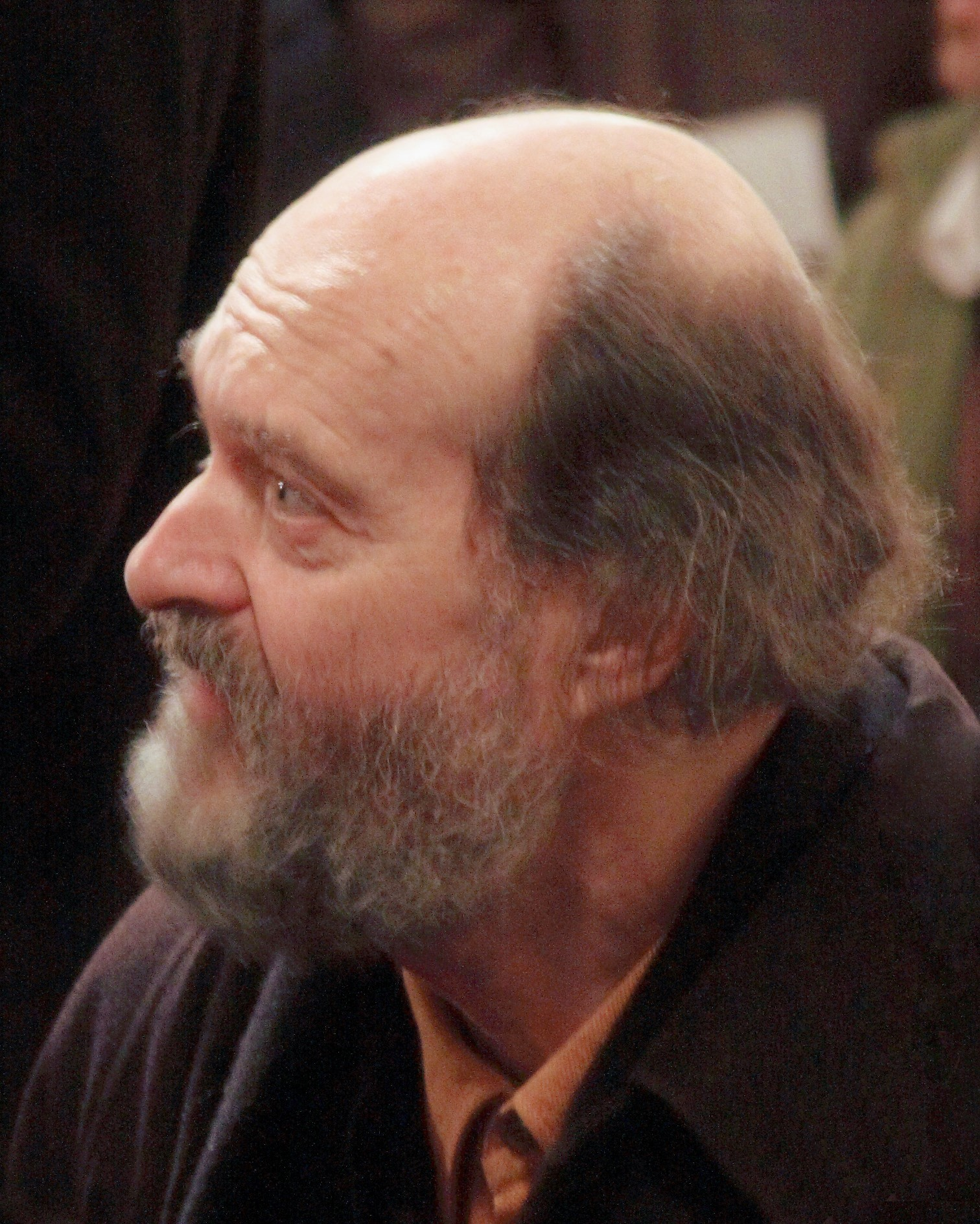
- Arvo Pärt
- Composed: 1966
- Performed: 13 October 1967, Tallinn
- Published: Hans Sikorski
- Duration: 14 min.

Symphony No. 2 is the second symphony by Estonian composer Arvo Pärt, written in 1966.

== Recordings ==
- Arvo Pärt, BIS (1989); Bamberg Symphony Orchestra, conductor Neeme Järvi
- Arvo Pärt. Collage, Chandos (1993); Philharmonia Orchestra, conductor Neeme Järvi
- Pro & contra. Arvo Pärt, Virgin classics (2004); Estonian National Symphony Orchestra, conductor Paavo Järvi
- The Sound of Arvo Pärt, Parlophone, Warner (2015); Estonian National Symphony Orchestra, conductor Paavo Järvi
- Arvo Pärt. The Symphonies, ECM (2018); Wrocław NFM Philharmonic Orchestra, conductor Tõnu Kaljuste
