= Cantus in Memoriam Benjamin Britten =

1977 musical composition by Arvo Pärt

- by Arvo Pärt
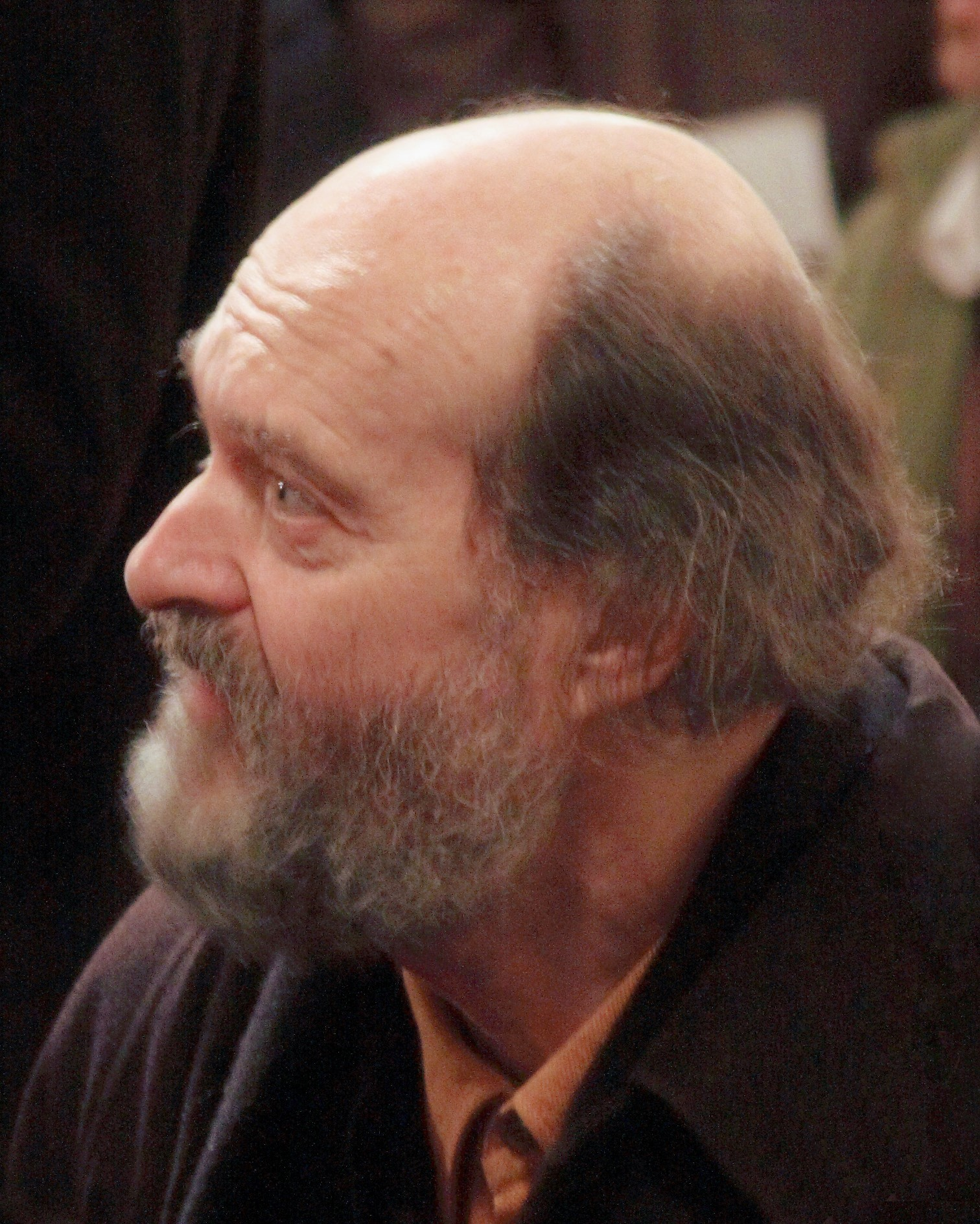
- The composer, photographed in Christ Church Cathedral, Dublin, 2008
- Key: A minor
- Form: canon
- Composed: 1977
- Dedication: memory of Benjamin Britten
- Scoring: string orchestra; bell

Cantus in Memoriam Benjamin Britten (sample) is a short canon in A minor, written in 1977 by the Estonian composer Arvo Pärt, for string orchestra and bell. The work is an early example of Pärt's tintinnabuli style, which he based on his reactions to early chant music. Its appeal is often ascribed to its relative simplicity; a single melodic motif dominates and it both begins and ends with scored silence. However, as the critic Ivan Hewett observes, while it "may be simple in concept...the concept produces a tangle of lines which is hard for the ear to unravel. And even where the music really is simple in its audible features, the expressive import of those features is anything but." A typical performance lasts about six and a half minutes.

The cantus was composed as an elegy to mourn the December 1976 death of the English composer Benjamin Britten. Pärt greatly admired Britten. Pärt described Britten as possessing the "unusual purity" that he himself sought as a composer. It is perhaps Pärt's most popular piece, and a 1997 recording by the Hungarian State Opera Orchestra conducted by Tamas Benedek has been widely distributed. Due to its evocative and cinematic feel, the piece has been used extensively as background accompaniment in both film and television documentaries.

== Composition ==
=== Overview ===
Scored for string orchestra and bell (only a single chime is used, on the pitch A, the tonal centre of the piece), Cantus exemplifies Pärt's tintinnabuli style, using only the pitches of a single A minor scale. The work is based on a simple idea, a descending A-minor scale, and is in the form of a prolation canon, an old technique which Pärt also uses in the work Festina Lente (Hurry slowly). It is in 6/4 meter and alternates long and short notes.

Pärt has said of "tintinnabulation": "The complex and many-faceted only confuses me, and I must search for unity. What is it, this one thing, and how do I find my way to it? Traces of this perfect thing appear in many guises – and everything that is unimportant falls away. Tintinnabulation is like this. Here I am alone with silence. I have discovered that it is enough when a single note is beautifully played. This one note, or a silent beat, or a moment of silence, comforts me."

Each part except the viola is split into two, with one playing notes from the A minor scale, and the other playing only notes from an A minor chord (i.e., A–C–E). These choices have a definite symbolism for Pärt. The former "always signifies the subjective world, the daily egoistic life of sin and suffering, [the latter] meanwhile, is the objective realm of forgiveness." For Pärt, there is only an apparent dualism here; he believes that "all is one."

The A natural minor scale has some historical connections. Before major and minor scales became prevalent in Western art music, music, especially the early liturgical music that has been so influential on Pärt, used a system of modes. The idea of musical modes was known to the ancient Greeks, and each was said to have a specific character which could strongly affect the mind. The church modes are formed by using the notes of the C major scale (i.e., the white keys on a piano) but starting at different notes in each mode. A scale of A with no black keys is in the Aeolian mode. Since all natural minor scales derive from the white keys on the piano played from A to A, in choosing the A minor scale Pärt is acknowledging his debt to early church music, or at least affirming his affinity with it.

=== Score ===
After the three beats of silence that open the score, a tubular bell is struck three times very quietly (pianissimo), with 12 beats between the strikes and gap of 18 beats between the groups of three. This bell tells of the death of Britten—it is the funeral bell. It continues to be struck in groups of three widely spaced intervals for most of the piece, fading out for a time in the last 21 bars, only to reappear at the last. After the bell has struck there is a brief pause for three beats of silence, and then the first violins begin setting the pattern which the rest of the ensemble will follow at slower speeds. Half of the first violins begin playing the descending A minor scale, playing first one note from the very top of their range, then returning to the beginning and playing two notes, and then three and four and so on. The other half of the violins play notes from an A minor chord. These notes start a fourth lower and drop in pitch only when it is overrun by the first. This creates a swirling effect of increasing tension which is relieved by dropping the note. They begin playing very quietly (pianississimo) but gradually over the piece build up until they are playing very loudly (fortississimo).

The second violins play exactly the same but an octave lower and at half the speed, which means they play 6 beats (one bar) of silence to begin, and appear to enter at the beginning of the second bar. Then the violas, which are the only voice not doubled, join in at quarter speed and another octave lower, the cellos at one eighth, and finally the contrabasses as one sixteenth. The basses are then playing each long note for 32 beats, and each short note for 16.

At bar 65 the first violins hit middle C, and when they do they cease playing the A minor scale and simply play C continuously until the end of the piece (i.e., for more than 250 beats). Eleven bars later the second violins hit a low A and play that continuously. Similarly the other voices gradually find the note that they have been seeking and once reached, they play it continuously until the end. The last to lock into place are the contrabasses which alight on a low A in bar 103. At this stage, the whole ensemble is playing an A minor chord very very loudly, and this continues for five bars, then on the second beat of the last bar they suddenly stop. At that moment, the bell is struck very quietly (pianissimo) so that the striking itself is not heard, but only the reverberations as it dies away. As the final bell toll reverberates, with all other instruments silent, the overtones of the bell become prominently audible.

== Subject matter ==
The piece is a meditation on death. Pärt's biographer, Paul Hillier, suggests that "how we live depends on our relationship with death: how we make music depends on our relationship to silence." It is significant that the piece begins and ends with silence—that the silence is written in the score. This silence creates a frame around the piece and has spiritual significance. It suggests that we come from silence, and return to silence; it reminds us that before we were born and after we die we are silent with respect to this world.

Speaking on his reaction to Britten's death, Pärt admitted,

Why did the date of Benjamin Britten's death – 4 December 1976 – touch such a chord in me? During this time I was obviously at the point where I could recognise the magnitude of such a loss. Inexplicable feelings of guilt, more than that even, arose in me. I had just discovered Britten for myself. Just before his death I began to appreciate the unusual purity of his music – I had had the impression of the same kind of purity in the ballads of Guillaume de Machaut. And besides, for a long time I had wanted to meet Britten personally – and now it would not come to that.

== Sources and bibliography ==
- Hillier, Paul. Arvo Pärt. Oxford: Oxford University Press, 1997. ISBN 0-19-816550-1
- Quinn, Peter. Arvo Pärt, Cantus in memory of Benjamin Britten. University of London, Goldsmiths' College, 1991
- Wallrabenstein, Wolfram. "Arvo Pärt: Cantus in memoriam Benjamin Britten". Zeitschrift für Musikpädagogik, 31 October 1985, 31. 13–31
