= Triodion (Pärt) =

1998 musical composition by Arvo Pärt

Triodion is a 15-minute choral work for mixed a cappella choir, composed in 1998 by the Estonian composer Arvo Pärt. It was a commission for the 150th anniversary of the foundation of Lancing College in West Sussex. It derives its lyrics from the Triodion, after which it is named. Its world premiere was on 30 April 1998 at Westminster Abbey by the choir of Lancing College Chapel, conducted by Neil Cox.
