= Festina lente (Pärt) =

1988 musical composition by Arvo Pärt

Festina lente (Latin for "make haste slowly") is a 1986 composition by Estonian composer Arvo Pärt. It is scored for string orchestra and harp. It uses layering to explore the musical ideas, by allowing the violas to take the melody, the violins to take it at double the speed and the basses to take the melody at half time.
