= Strong confinement limit =

In physics, the strong confinement limit, or "festina lente" limit, is a mode of an atom laser in which the frequency of emission of the Bose–Einstein condensate is less than the confinement frequency of the trap.
