= Vladimir Martynov =

Russian composer

Vladimir Ivanovich Martynov
- Владимир Иванович Мартынов
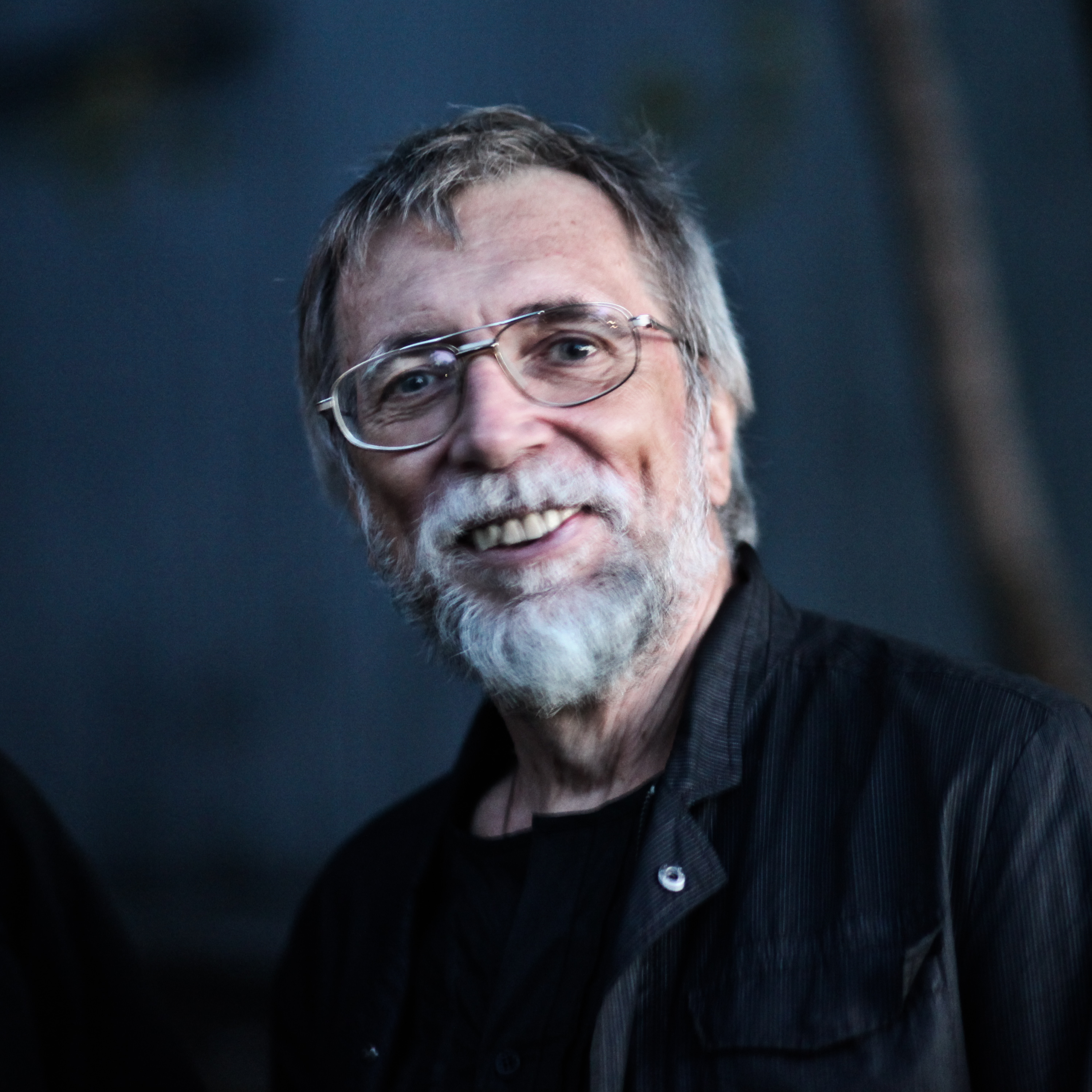
- Vladimir Martynov in 2014
- Born: February 20, 1946 (age 80); Moscow
- Education: Moscow Conservatory
- Occupation: Composer

Vladimir Ivanovich Martynov (Russian: Владимир Иванович Мартынов) (Moscow, 20 February 1946) is a Russian composer, known for his compositions in the concerto, orchestral music, chamber music, and choral music genres.

== Life ==
Vladimir Martynov studied piano as a child. Gaining an interest in composition, he enrolled in the Moscow Conservatory where he studied piano under Mikhail Mezhlumov and composition under Nikolai Sidelnikov, graduating in 1971.

In his early works, such as the String Quartet (1966), the Concerto for Oboe and Flute (1968), Hexagramme for Piano (1971), and Violin Sonata (1973), Vladimir Martynov used serial music (or twelve-tone) technique. In 1973 he got a job at the studio for electronic music of the Alexander Scriabin Museum. For Soviet composers of this era, this studio had much the same meaning as the RAI Electronic Music Studio in Milan, the West German Radio studio, and the ORTF Studio in Paris, providing a meeting ground for the avant-garde musicians. Sofia Gubaidulina, Sergei Nemtin, Alfred Schnittke, and Edison Denisov were among the composers regularly working and meeting there.

Martynov helped to form a rock group called Boomerang at the Scriabin Studio. For them he wrote a rock opera Seraphic Visions from St. Francis of Assisi (1978).

Vladimir Martynov is also known as a serious ethnomusicologist, specializing in the music of the Caucasian peoples, Tajikistan, and other ethnic groups in Russia. He also studied medieval Russian and European music, as well as religious musical history and musicology. While even in Soviet times this field of study was considered generally acceptable, it also allowed him to study theology, religious philosophy and history. Vladimir Martynov began studying early Russian religious chant in the late 1970s; he also studied the music of such composers as Machaut, Gabrieli, Isaac, Dufay, and Dunstable, publishing editions of their music. He became interested in the brand of minimalism developing in the Soviet Union in the late 1970s: a static, spiritually-inspired style without the shimmering pulse of American minimalism. The timeless quality of chants and the lack of a sense of bar lines in Renaissance polyphony entered into his version of minimalism.

At about this time, he began teaching at the Academy of Trinity Lavra of St. Sergius in Sergiyev Posad. There was a period of consolidation in the early 1980s where he wrote music specifically tailored for use in church services, then resuming writing original music in his minimalist style. Among his works from this period is Come in! for violin and ensemble of 1988 which was performed by Gidon Kremer and by the composer's partner, Tatiana Grindenko.

Since the fall of the Soviet Union, he has written works that take on large Christian themes, such as Apocalypse (1991), Lamentations of Jeremiah (1992), Magnificat (1993), Stabat Mater (1994), and Requiem (1998). One of his major compositions is a nearly hour-long piece called Opus Posthumum (1993), devoted to the idea that "a man touches the truth twice. The first time is the first cry from a new born baby's lips and the last is the death rattle. Everything between is untruth to a greater or lesser extent." He also composed a much shorter Opus Prenatum and a work called Twelve Victories of King Arthur for Seven Pianos (1990).

He has recordings on Le Chant du Monde's imprint "Les Saisons Russes" and on the Moscow-based independent label LongArms Records. In 2009 the London Philharmonic performed the world premiere of his opera Vita Nuova. The opera premiered in the U.S. on February 28, 2009 at the new Alice Tully Hall in New York City. Martynov's composition "The Beatitudes", as performed by the Kronos Quartet, was featured in La Grande Bellezza (The Great Beauty), the winner of the 2014 Academy Award for Best Foreign Language Film.

Vladimir Martynov has written several books and seminal articles on musical theory, history and philosophy of music.

== Works ==
- String Quartet (1966)
- Concerto for Oboe and Flute (1968)
- Hexagramme for Piano (1971)
- Violin Sonata (1973)
- Seraphic Visions From St. Francis of Assisi (rock opera) (1978)
- Come In! for 2 Violins and Orchestra (1988)
- Twelve Victories of King Arthur for 7 Pianos (1990)
- Apocalypse (1991)
- Lamentations of Jeremiah (1992)
- Magnificat (1993)
- Opus Posthumum (1993)
- Stabat Mater (1994)
- The Beatitudes (1998)
- Requiem (1998)
- Singapore: A Geopolitical Utopia (symphony) (2005)
- Vita Nuova (opera) (c. 2009)
- Opus Prenatum (2014)

== Selected recordings ==
- Music of Vladimir Martynov Kronos Quartet
- Lamentations (Плач пророка Иеремии) Andrei Kotov, Sirin Choir
- Night in Galicia – on the poem by Velimir Khlebnikov. Tatiana Grindenko, Ensemble Opus Posth
- Stabat Mater. Requiem. Tatiana Grindenko, Ensemble Opus Posth
- Passionslieder. Tatiana Grindenko, Ensemble Opus Posth
- Litania. Tatiana Grindenko, Ensemble Opus Posth
- come in! Tatiana Grindenko, Ensemble Opus Posth

== Family ==
Martynov's grandfather was Yakov Samuilovich (Semyonovich) Gembitsky (born 1876), doctor, graduate of the Imperial Moscow University (1900). His grandmother was Tatyana Iosifovna Gembitskaya (Volkova, born 1880).

Martynov's wife is violinist Tatyana Tikhonovna Grindenko.

== Sources ==
Wilson, Tara. "Russian Post-Minimalist Music: A Semiological Investigation into the Narrative Approaches employed by Alexander Knaifel between 1978 and 1994" (PhD thesis: Goldsmiths, University of London, 2015).
