= Rostock Motet Choir =

The Rostock Motet Choir (German: Rostocker Motettenchor) was founded in 1964 by Hartwig Eschenburg and gave concerts from the early days in famous churches and concert halls in East Germany. The Rostock Motet Choir is part of the church choir (St. Johannis-Kantorei) at St. John's Church in Rostock. The choir has performed inter alia at the Kreuzkirche, Dresden, St. Thomas' Church and the Neues Gewandhaus in Leipzig, as well as the Berlin Concert Hall. Many well-known soloists, such as Peter Schreier and Ludwig Güttler, have worked with the Rostock Motet Choir.

== Discography ==
- Bach motets on Bach Edition Leipzig 1980-1984, Capriccio 2000
- Bach motets on Bach Edition Leipzig 1980-1984, Delta 2006
- Abendstille Berlin 1988
- In Principio, Aliud 2006
- various CDs with concert recordings, own label
