= Misha Rachlevsky =

Russian conductor

Misha Rachlevsky (Russian: Михаил (Миша) Львович Рахлевский: born 13 November 1946, Moscow) is a Russian conductor.

Conductor Misha Rachlevsky was born in Moscow, he began his musical education at the early age of five with violin lessons, he studied at the Moscow Conservatory and the Gnessin Russian Academy of Music in Moscow. In 1973 he left the Soviet Union, working in Israel, South Africa and in Canada. In 1976 he settled in the United States. Later he founded the New American Chamber Orchestra (NACO). In 1989 Rachlevsky moved to Spain and later back to Moscow, where he created Chamber Orchestra Kremlin.
