= Miserere (Pärt) =

1989 musical composition by Arvo Pärt

Miserere is a choral work by Estonian composer Arvo Pärt, setting the words of two liturgical hymns: the Miserere and the Dies irae. The piece begins with repeated pleas for mercy, accompanied by dramatic pauses, leading to the arrival of the day of wrath, signaled by a powerful drum roll. The drum initiates each new verse as the choir sings the most terrifying words in the Christian liturgy. Having confronted catastrophe, the choir ascends to radiant heights over the deep-throated resonance of the organ, tam-tam, and bell. Performances of The Miserere typically last around 35 minutes. The composition was written between 1989 and 1992.
