= Festina lente =

Classical adage

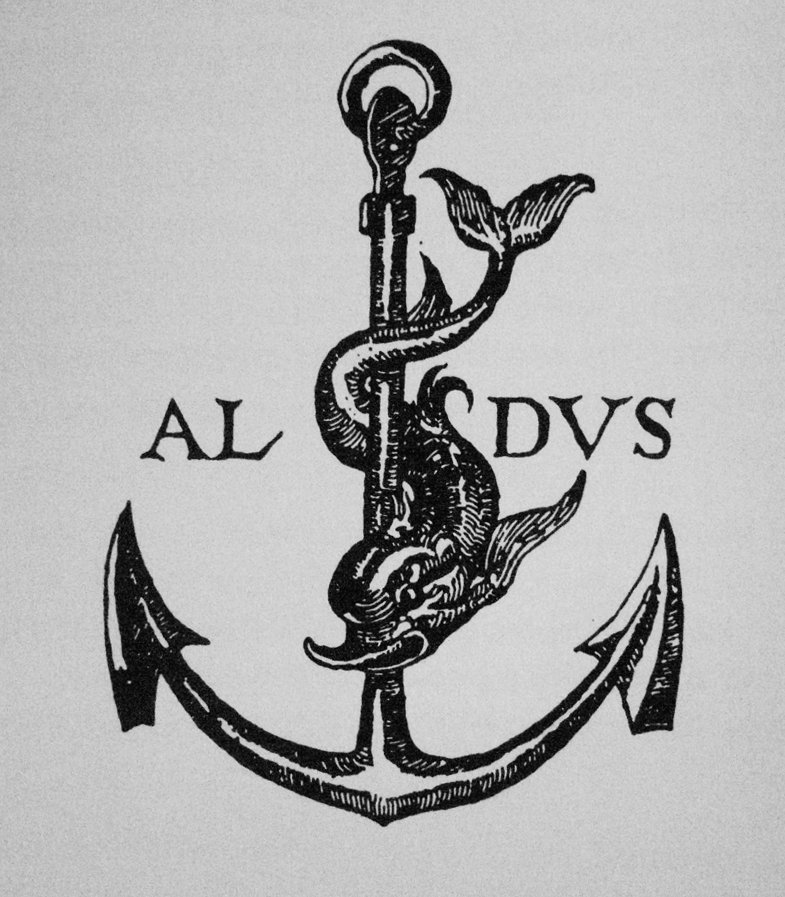
The emblem of the dolphin and anchor which has been used since Roman times to illustrate the adage. This example is the printer's mark of Aldus.

Festina lente (Classical Latin: [fɛsˈtiː.naː ˈlɛn.teː]) or speûde bradéōs (σπεῦδε βραδέως, pronounced [spêu̯.de bra.dé.ɔːs]) is a classical adage and oxymoron meaning "make haste slowly" (sometimes rendered in English as "more haste, less speed"). It has been adopted as a motto numerous times, particularly by the emperors Augustus and Titus, then later by the Medicis and the Onslows. During the 1960s the Cuban Revolution used this ancient phrase (apresúrate lentamente) in its message to the masses.

The original form of the saying, σπεῦδε βραδέως speũde bradéōs, is Classical Greek, of which festīnā lentē is the Latin translation. The words σπεῦδε and festina are second-person-singular present active imperatives, meaning "make haste", while βραδέως and lente are adverbs, meaning "slowly".

== History ==
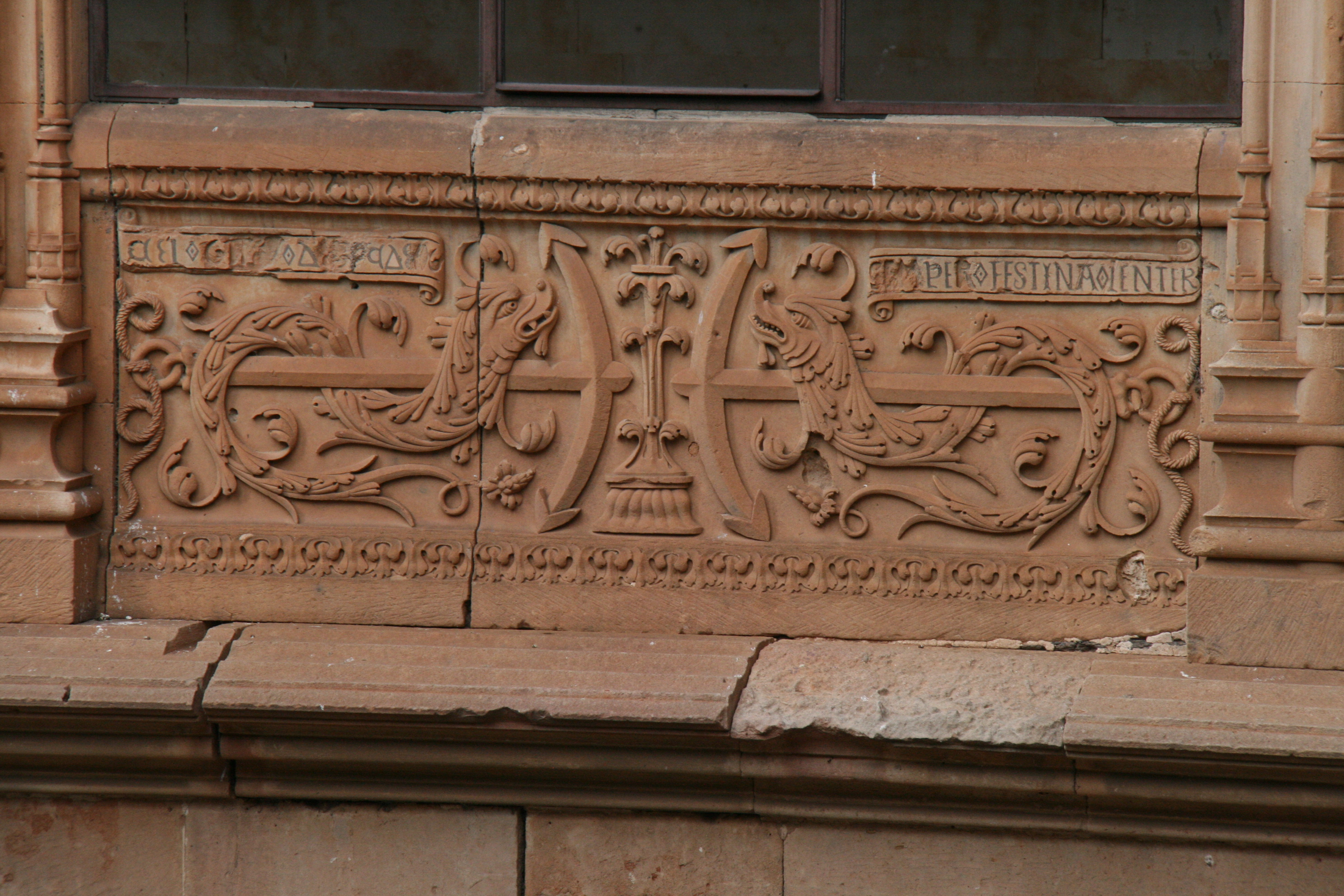
The adage, in Greek and Latin, with the anchor and the dolphin, among the seven emblems of the University of Salamanca.

The Roman historian Suetonius, in De vita Caesarum, tells that Augustus deplored rashness in a military commander, thus "σπεῦδε βραδέως" was one of his favourite sayings:

Nihil autem minus perfecto duci quam festinationem temeritatemque convenire arbitrabatur. Crebro itaque illa iactabat: σπεῦδε βραδέως; ἀσφαλὴς γάρ ἐστ᾽ ἀμείνων ἢ θρασὺς στρατηλάτης; et: "sat celeriter fieri quidquid fiat satis bene."
(He thought nothing less becoming in a well-trained leader than haste and rashness, and, accordingly, favourite sayings of his were: "Hasten slowly"; "Better a safe commander than a bold"; and "That which has been done well has been done quickly enough.")

Certain gold coins minted for Augustus bore images of a crab and a butterfly to attempt an emblem for the adage. Other such visualizations include a hare in a snail shell; a chameleon with a fish; a diamond ring entwined with foliage; and perhaps most recognizably, a dolphin entwined around an anchor.

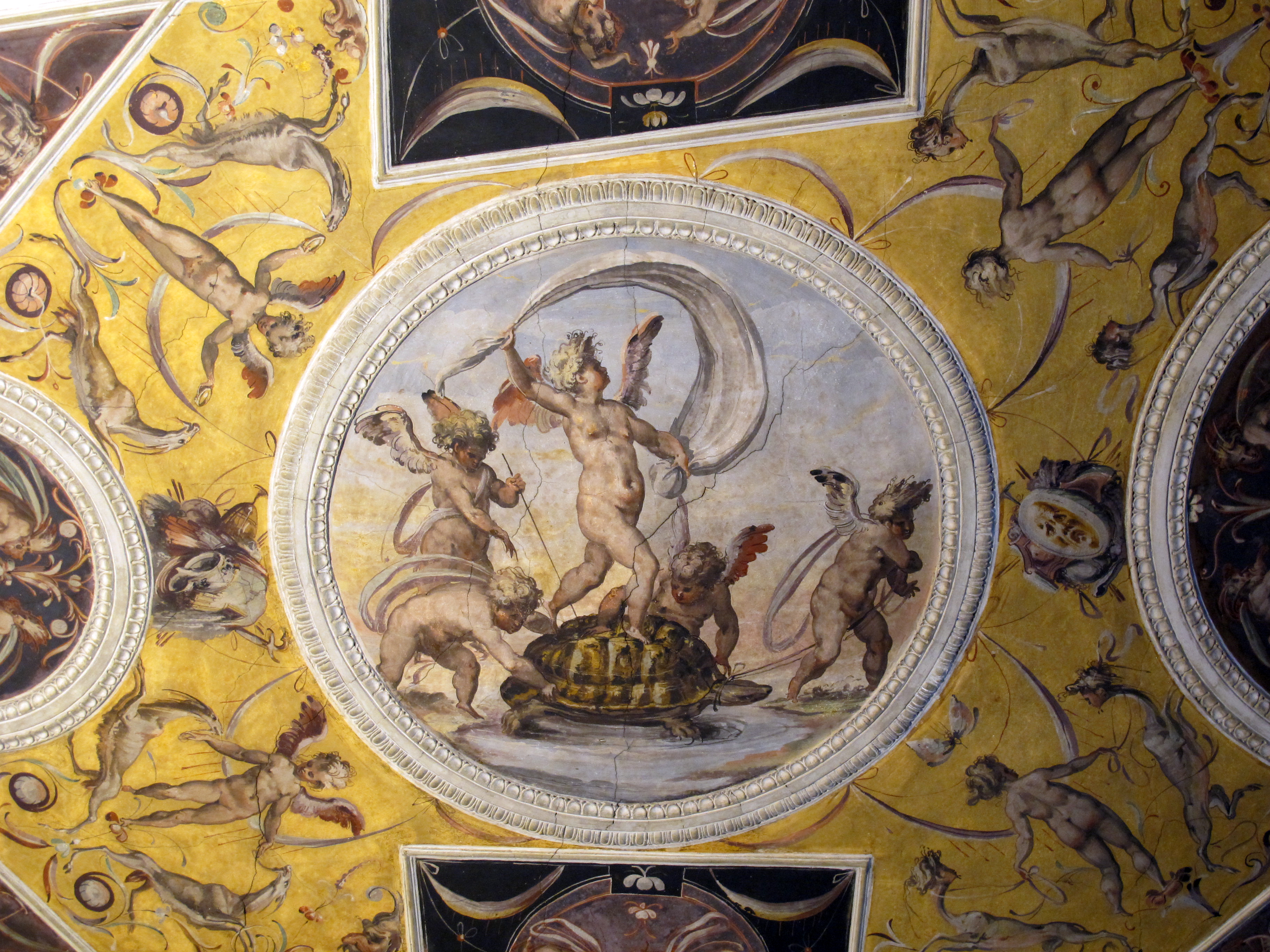
An example of the Medici impresa of the sailing tortoise in the Palazzo Vecchio

Cosimo I de' Medici, Grand Duke of Tuscany took festina lente as his motto and symbolised it with a sail-backed tortoise. This emblem appears repeatedly throughout his Palazzo Vecchio where it was painted by the artist Giorgio Vasari. There are about 100 instances in the palace decorations and frescos and there are now tours with the object of finding them all.

The Renaissance printer Aldus Manutius adopted the symbol of the dolphin and anchor as his printer's mark. Erasmus (whose books were published by Manutius) featured the phrase in his Adagia and used it to compliment his printer: "Aldus, making haste slowly, has acquired as much gold as he has reputation, and richly deserves both." Manutius showed Erasmus a Roman silver coin, given to him by Cardinal Bembo, which bore the dolphin-and-anchor symbol on the reverse side.

The adage was popular in the Renaissance era and Shakespeare alluded to it repeatedly. In Love's Labour's Lost, he copied the crab and butterfly imagery with the characters Moth and Armado.

The French poet and critic Nicolas Boileau, in his Art poétique (The Art of Poetry) (1674) applied the dictum specifically to the work of the writer, whom he advised in those words:

Hâtez-vous lentement, et sans perdre courage,
Vingt fois sur le métier remettez votre ouvrage,
Polissez-le sans cesse, et le repolissez,
Ajoutez quelquefois, et souvent effacez.

(Slowly make haste, and without losing courage;
Twenty times redo your work;
Polish and re-polish endlessly,
And sometimes add, but often take away)

Jean de la Fontaine alluded to the motto in his famous fable of "The Hare and the Tortoise" (Fables, 1668–94), writing that the tortoise "with a prudent wisdom hastens slowly".

The Onslow family of Shropshire has the adage as its motto, generating a pun upon the family name: "on-slow".

The adage was a favourite of the influential judge, Sir Matthew Hale,

Sir Matthew Hale was naturally a quick man; yet, by much practice on himself, he subdued that to such a degree, that he would never run suddenly into any conclusion concerning any matter of importance. Festina Lente was his beloved motto, which he ordered to be engraved on the head of his staff, and was often heard to say that he had observed many witty men run into great errors, because they did not give themselves time to think...

— Bishop Burnet, The Life and Death of Sir Matthew Hale

== Meaning ==
The meaning of the phrase is that activities should be performed with a proper balance of urgency and diligence. If tasks are rushed too quickly then mistakes are made and good long-term results are not achieved. Work is best done in a state of flow in which one is fully engaged by the task and there is no sense of time passing.

== Allusions ==
In physics, the name "Festina Lente Limit" has been applied to the Strong Confinement Limit, which is a mode of an atom laser in which the frequency of emission of the Bose–Einstein condensate is less than the confinement frequency of the trap.

Composer Arvo Pärt wrote Festina lente for strings and harp, in which some instruments play the melody at half-speed while others play it at double-speed, so the music is both fast and slow.

Goethe refers to both the proverb and Augustus' adoption of it in his poem Hermann und Dorothea (helpfully for poetry, the German rendition itself rhymes—"Eile mit Weile"):

Laßt uns auch diesmal doch nur die Mittelstraße betreten! Eile mit Weile! das war selbst Kaiser Augustus' Devise.
(Let us again take the middle course. Make haste slowly: that was even Emperor Augustus' motto.)

The Lord Chancellor uses the phrase in W S Gilbert's Iolanthe: "Recollect yourself I pray, and be careful what you say — as the ancient Romans said, festina lente."

In Bram Stoker's 1897 novel Dracula, Dr. Van Helsing says of Count Dracula,

He has all along, since his coming, been trying his power, slowly but surely; that big child-brain of his is working. Well for us, it is, as yet, a child brain; for had he dared, at the first, to attempt certain things he would long ago have been beyond our power. However, he means to succeed, and a man who has centuries before him can afford to wait and to go slow. Festina lente may well be his motto.

The novel Mr. Penumbra's 24-Hour Bookstore by Robin Sloan involves a secret society devoted to Aldus Manutius, whose members use "Festina lente" as a motto/greeting.

Basketball coach John Wooden used the adage throughout his writing on coaching, changing it to, "Be quick, but don't hurry."

"Festina lente" is the family motto of Lord Buntingdon in Compton Mackenzie's 1941 comedic novel "The Monarch of the Glen".

== See also ==
- The Tortoise and the Hare
- Festina lente (bridge), a pedestrian bridge in Sarajevo
