= RIAS =

RIAS or Rias may refer to:

== Organisations ==
- Recording Industry Association Singapore
- Research Institute for Advanced Studies, the former research facility created by the Glenn L. Martin Company
- Rundfunk im amerikanischen Sektor (Broadcasting in the American Sector), a radio and television station in West Berlin, Germany
  - Deutsches Symphonie-Orchester Berlin (formerly the RIAS Symphonie-Orchester), a broadcast orchestra based in Berlin
  - RIAS Kammerchor, a choir founded as a radio choir and based in Berlin
- Royal Incorporation of Architects in Scotland, a professional body

== Other uses ==
- Regulatory impact analysis statement, a description of the impact of new Canadian federal regulations
- Remote infrared audible signage, for the blind
- Reynolds Intellectual Assessment Scales, an intelligence test
- Rias Gremory, a fictional character in the High School DxD franchise
- Rias Line, a railway line in Japan

== See also ==
- RIA (disambiguation)
- Rías Altas, a section of A Costa do Marisco (the Seafood Coast) in Galicia, Spain
- Rías Baixas, a series of four estuarine inlets located on the southwestern coast of Galicia, Spain
