= Fratres =

1977 musical composition by Arvo Pärt

- Instrumental music by Arvo Pärt
- Form: Variations
- Composed: 1977
- Scoring: Variable

Fratres (meaning "brothers" in Latin) is a musical work by the Estonian composer Arvo Pärt exemplifying his tintinnabuli style of composition. It was composed in 1977. It is written for three parts without fixed instrumentation and has been described as a "mesmerizing set of variations on a six-bar theme combining frantic activity and sublime stillness."

== Structure ==
Structurally, Fratres consists of a set of nine chord sequences separated by a recurring percussion motif. The chord sequences themselves follow a pattern and were generated by means of a simple formula.

Fratres is driven by three main voices. The low and high voices are each restricted to playing notes from the D harmonic minor scale (D, E, F, G, A, Bb, C#); the middle voice is restricted to the notes of the A minor triad (A, C, E). The entire piece is accompanied by drones in A and E, which are primarily heard in the percussion "refuge" motif between each sequence.

The chords are created by the movement of the three voices: the low voice starts at C#; the high voice starts at E. Both the low and high voices are moved up or down the D harmonic minor scale at the same time, with the direction of the movement depending on the position within the sequence. The middle voice starts at A and plays a different pattern (A, E, E, C, C, C, C, A, A, E, E, C, C, A). The generated chords create harmonic ambiguity, since both C# and C are present for an A major or A minor chord.

== Versions ==
Although often performed by violin and piano, versions for larger ensembles, such as a string quartet or chamber orchestra, are also common. Performances by early music specialists have also been endorsed.

Versions for ensembles include:

- chamber orchestra (1977)
- cello ensemble (1982)
- string quartet (1989)
- winds and percussion octet (1990)
- string and percussion orchestra (1991)
- band of metal instruments (2004)
- three recorders, percussion, and cello or viola da gamba (2009)
- saxophone quartet (2010)

Versions for solo instrument and accompaniment:

- violin and piano (1980)
- cello and piano (1989)
- violin, string orchestra, and percussion (1992)
- trombone, string orchestra, and percussion (1993)
- cello, string orchestra, and percussion (1995)
- guitar, string orchestra, and percussion (2000)
- viola and piano (2003)
- four percussionists (2006)
- viola, string orchestra, and percussion (2008)
- piano (2025)

== In popular culture ==
The composition has been used for many films and documentaries. Notable usages include:

- 1987: Rachel River directed by Sandy Smolan
- 1996: Mother Night directed by Keith Gordon; Fratres is performed by Tasmin Little (violin) and Martin Roscoe (piano)
- 1997: Winter Sleepers directed by Tom Tykwer
- 1999: New York: A Documentary Film directed by Ric Burns
- 2001: A Knight's Tale directed by Brian Helgeland
- 2005: Auschwitz: The Nazis and 'The Final Solution' produced by Laurence Rees; uses a performance from 1997 by the Hungarian State Opera Orchestra conducted by Tamás Benedek
- 2006: La Morte Rouge directed by Victor Erice
- 2007: There Will Be Blood directed by Paul Thomas Anderson
- 2013: To the Wonder directed by Terrence Malick
- 2013: The Place Beyond the Pines directed by Derek Cianfrance
- 2013: Violette directed by Martin Provost
- 2015: El Club directed by Pablo Larraín
- 2017: Mountain directed by Jennifer Peedom
- 2017: Félicité directed by Alain Gomis

=== In other compositions ===
Jazz pianist Aaron Parks incorporated elements of Fratres into his composition "Harvesting Dance", heard on his album Invisible Cinema and on Terence Blanchard's album Flow.
