= Tatiana Grindenko =

Russian violinist (born 1946)

- Born: Tatiana Tikhonovna Grindenko; 29 March 1946 (age 79); Kharkov, Ukrainian SSR, USSR
- Occupations: violinist, teacher

Tatiana Tikhonovna Grindenko (Russian: Татьяна Тихоновна Гринденко; born 1946) is a Russian violinist and Meritorious Artist who graduated from the Moscow Conservatory and then became an assistant to Yuri Yankelevich. She is a founder of Grindenko Ensemble and currently works as a soloist there. She has appeared on stage along such conductors as Frans Brüggen, Kurt Masur, Kurt Sanderling, M. Rostropovich, Gidon Kremer, G. Rozhdestvensky, K. Kondrashin and Yuri Temirkanov as well as various pianists and violinists such as A. Lubimov and A. Kniazev. Her CDs were published under such labels as Melodiya, Ondine, Deutsche Grammophon, Long Arms Records, and many others. She has also managed productions and performances of operas such as The Magic Flute which was directed by Katya Pospelova, Mozart and Salieri, and Go and Stop Progress of Anatoly Vasiliev and Yuri Lyubimov, and llya Applebaum's Orpheus.
