= Tintinnabuli =

Compositional style created by the Estonian composer Arvo Pärt

Tintinnabuli (from Latin tintinnabulum, a kind of bell, plural tintinnabula^{(Wiktionary)}) is a compositional style created by the Estonian composer Arvo Pärt, introduced in his Für Alina (1976), and used again in Spiegel im Spiegel (1978). This simple style was influenced by the composer's mystical experiences with chant music. Musically, Pärt's tintinnabular music is characterized by two types of voice, the first of which (dubbed the "tintinnabular voice") arpeggiates the tonic triad, and the second of which moves diatonically in mostly stepwise motion. The works often have a slow and meditative tempo, and a minimalist approach to both notation and performance. Pärt's compositional approach has expanded somewhat in the years since 1970, but the overall effect remains largely the same. An early example can be heard in Cantus in Memoriam Benjamin Britten.

== Pärt's own comments on his style ==
- "Tintinnabulation is an area I sometimes wander into when I am searching for answers – in my life, my music, my work. In my dark hours, I have the certain feeling that everything outside this one thing has no meaning. The complex and many-faceted only confuses me, and I must search for unity. What is it, this one thing, and how do I find my way to it? Traces of this perfect thing appear in many guises – and everything that is unimportant falls away. Tintinnabulation is like this. . . . The three notes of a triad are like bells. And that is why I call it tintinnabulation."
- "I could compare my music to white light which contains all colours. Only a prism can divide the colours and make them appear; this prism could be the spirit of the listener." – from the essay White Light by Hermann Conen, as translated into English by Eileen Walliser-Schwarzbart (found in the liner notes of the ECM release of Alina).
- "Tintinnabuli is the mathematically exact connection from one line to another.....tintinnabuli is the rule where the melody and the accompaniment [accompanying voice]...is one. One and one, it is one – it is not two. This is the secret of this technique." – from a conversation between Arvo Pärt and Antony Pitts recorded for BBC Radio 3 at the Royal Academy of Music in London on 29 March 2000, as printed in the liner notes of the Naxos Records release of Passio.
