= 2008 in music =

This topic covers notable events and articles related to 2008 in music. This year was the peak of record sales in the United States, with sales declining year on year since then.

== Specific locations ==
- 2008 in American music
- 2008 in British music
- 2008 in Canadian music
- 2008 in European music (Continental Europe)
- 2008 in Irish music
- 2008 in Japanese music
- 2008 in New Zealand music
- 2008 in Norwegian music
- 2008 in Scandinavian music
- 2008 in Swedish music
- 2008 in South Korean music
- 2008 in West African music

== Specific genres ==
- 2008 in rock music
- 2008 in classical music
- 2008 in country music
- 2008 in electro pop music
- 2008 in heavy metal music
- 2008 in hip-hop
- 2008 in jazz
- 2008 in Latin music
- 2008 in opera
- 2008 in progressive rock

== Events ==
=== January ===
- January 1 – Julia Fischer makes her début as a concert pianist, performing Edvard Grieg's Piano Concerto in A minor with the Junge Deutsche Philharmonie at the Alte Oper, Frankfurt. The concert was conducted by Matthias Pintscher, who replaced Sir Neville Marriner. On the same occasion she also performed the Violin Concerto no. 3 in B minor by Camille Saint-Saëns.
- January 5 – The Salzburg Festival launches the "Herbert von Karajan Jubilee Year" with a concert in Salzburg's Grosses Festspielhaus.
- January 19–February 3 – Rage Against the Machine headline the Big Day Out festivals in Australia and New Zealand, their first shows outside the United States since reforming, and their first Australian shows in 12 years. They join co-headliners Björk, who pulled out of the Sydney festival under doctor's orders, and Arcade Fire.
- January 29 – Face to Face announce that they will reunite for select shows in the US and internationally.
- January 31 – Laura Attwood of the King Edward VI School in Morpeth wins the second Eileen Bowler Award.

=== February ===
- February 8 – Michael Jackson's Thriller album, the world's best-selling album of all time, is reissued as Thriller 25 to celebrate its 25th anniversary, with Jackson himself as executive producer.
- February 10 – The 50th Annual Grammy Awards ceremony takes place at the Staples Center in Los Angeles, US. Amy Winehouse wins five awards, including both Record of the Year and Song of the Year for "Rehab", along with Best New Artist. Herbie Hancock's River: The Joni Letters wins Album of the Year.
- February 11 – After pleading no contest to a felony weapons charge, The Game was sentenced to 60 days in jail, 150 hours of community service, and three years of probation in connection with an incident where he was alleged to have brandished a gun at a basketball game in South Los Angeles in February 2007.
- February 19 – System of a Down guitarist, Daron Malakian, tells MTV.com that the band is not likely to reform as he will be concentrating on his new project Scars on Broadway.
- February 20–25 – Viña del Mar International Song Festival is held in Chile.
- February 23 – March 3 – The second annual Soundwave festival is held in Australia.
- February 26 – The Return of the Spice Girls tour comes to a close in Toronto.

=== March ===
- March 6–9 – The 2008 Langerado Music Festival is held on the Big Cypress Indian Reservation in southern Florida.
- March 7 – The Jakarta International Java Jazz Festival 2008 takes place in Indonesia.
- March 7–16 – The 2008 South by Southwest Conference and Festival is held in Austin, Texas, US.
- March 11
  - Jazz musician and broadcaster Humphrey Lyttelton announces his retirement from presenting BBC Radio 2's jazz programme after forty years.
  - Rick Ross releases his second studio album, Trilla, to mixed reviews.
- March 25–29 – Miami Winter Music Conference.
- March 31 – theJazz radio station stops broadcasting.

=== April ===
- April 1 – Scott Weiland's departure from rock band Velvet Revolver becomes official. His reunion with his former band, Stone Temple Pilots, and tensions between him and the rest of Velvet Revolver, led to his departure.
- April 5
  - The reunited Face to Face perform together for the first time in four-and-a-half-years at The Bamboozle Left in Irvine, California, US.
  - Leona Lewis single "Bleeding Love" reached number 1 in 35 countries and became the first song to top the Billboard Hot 100 chart by a female British solo artist in 20 years since Kim Wilde did with "You Keep Me Hangin On" back in 1987. Her single was later proclaimed as the best selling single of 2008 worldwide and Lewis was named Top New Artist by Billboard.
- April 12 – "Touch My Body" becomes Mariah Carey's 18th number 1 single on the Billboard Hot 100, putting her into second place among artists with the most number 1 singles in the rock era, and first place as a solo artist, surpassing Elvis Presley.
- April 15 – Mayor Antonio Villaraigosa officially proclaims Mariah Carey Day in Los Angeles, California, US. On this day, Mariah Carey also releases E=MC², her eleventh studio album. It debuts at #1 on the Billboard 200 albums chart with the highest first-week sales of her career.
- April 20 – Garth Brooks inducted Steven Curtis Chapman on Music City Walk of Fame.
- April 22 – Andrey Baranov of Russia wins First Prize in the Second Benjamin Britten International Violin Competition in London.

=== May ===
- May 3 – The sixth annual The Bamboozle festival opens at the Meadowlands Sports Complex, East Rutherford, New Jersey, US.
- May 10–11 – Garth Brooks inducted Carrie Underwood on Grand Ole Opry.
  - The Give It A Name 2008 festival is held at Earls Court, London, UK.
- May 14 – The "Spirit of Change" Gospel Choir celebrates its tenth anniversary with the 20th Zündorfer Gospelnacht concert in the Catholic Parish Church of St. Mariae Geburt, in Zündorf.
- May 21 – David Cook defeats David Archuleta to win season 7 of American Idol, in a contest decided by 97.5 million votes, a record for the show.
- May 24 – 43 countries compete in the 2008 Eurovision Song Contest final in Belgrade, Serbia, including newcomers San Marino and Azerbaijan. The contest is won by Russia, with Believe by Dima Bilan.
- May 24–26 – The Sasquatch! Music Festival is held over Memorial Day weekend at The Gorge Amphitheatre in central Washington, US.
- May 25 – The Slovak preliminary round of the first Bluegrass competition (toward the annual Czech Festival Banjo Jamboree) is held in Hviezdoslavovo námestie, Bratislava.

=== June ===
- June 1
  - Westlife play their 10th anniversary concert at Europe's fourth biggest stadium, Croke Park, in Dublin, Republic of Ireland.
  - A fire at Universal Studios in Universal City, California, destroys as many as 175,000 master tapes containing as many as half a million songs by 20th and 21st century artists, some of which had never been released or digitized. The full extent of the damage was not made public until 2019.
- June 6-8 – The 2008 Wakarusa Music and Camping Festival is held at Clinton State Park near Lawrence, Kansas, US.
- June 10 – Lil Wayne's sixth album Tha Carter III sells 1 million copies in its first week of release.
- June 12–15 – The 2008 Bonnaroo Music Festival is held in Manchester, Tennessee, US.
- June 13–15
  - The seventh Isle of Wight Festival takes place in Seaclose Park, Newport, Isle of Wight, UK.
  - The annual Download Festival takes place at Donington Park in Leicestershire, England. The main stage was headlined by Kiss, The Offspring and Lostprophets, the Tuborg stage by Simple Plan, HIM and Cavalera Conspiracy, and the Gibson stage by The Dillinger Escape Plan, Testament and Jonathan Davis and the SFA.
- June 15 – E. Kallai from Hungary wins First Prize in the 11th Carl Fleisch International Violin Competition in Mosonmagyaróvár, Hungary.
- June 20 – My Bloody Valentine play their first reunion show at the Roundhouse, London, UK.
- June 27–29 – The Eidgenössiches Jodlerfest is held in Lucerne.
- June 29 – Release of Guitar Hero: Aerosmith, the first video game in the Guitar Hero series to be based around a single music group.

=== July ===
- July 3 – Opening of the O2 Wireless Festival in Hyde Park, London, UK.
- July 5 – Staatsminister Rainer Robra and Halberstadt Oberbürgermeister Andreas Henke preside as the notes A♭ and C are added in the sixth sound change of the performance of John Cage's Organ²/ASLSP (As SLow aS Possible) that began on 5 September 2001 and is to conclude on 5 September 2640, in Halberstadt, Germany.
- July 23–26 – The 2008 10,000 Lakes Festival is held.
- July 24–25 – The Splendour in the Grass music festival is held in Byron Bay, Australia, headlined by Devo and Wolfmother.
- July 24–28 – The Fifth International Symposium of throat-singing, "Khoomei—Cultural Phenomenon of the Peoples of Central Asia" is held in Tuva.

=== August ===
- August 8 – Chen Qigang is director of music for the 2008 Summer Olympics opening ceremony in Beijing. A minor scandal ensues when it is revealed that Lin Miaoke, the performer of "Ode to the Motherland", was miming to a recording by another girl, Yang Peiyi.
- August 12–18 – Sziget Festival 2008 takes place in Budapest, Hungary.
- August 13 – Jeff Singer quits Paradise Lost.
- August 16 - Madonna celebrates her 50th birthday.
- August 19 – LeRoi Moore, saxophonist and founding member of Dave Matthews Band, dies from complications from an ATV accident suffered earlier in the summer.
- August 30
  - Filipino rock band Eraserheads hold their one-night-only reunion concert in the Fort open field, their first concert since 2001. After the 20-minute break, vocalist Ely Buendia is rushed to the hospital because of chest pain due to emotional stress.
  - American Idol Season 7 runner-up David Archuleta's debut single "Crush" scores the highest debut of a song on the Billboard Hot 100 by an American Idol finalist not performed on the show. The track opened at No. 2 after selling 166,000 downloads in its first week of release.

=== September ===
- September 6 – Six members of The Specials re-unite at the Bestival as a 'Surprise Act'. They use the name "Terry Hall and Friends", because Jerry Dammers, who owns the band's name, did not participate.
- September 7 – The 2008 MTV Video Music Awards are presented at Paramount Studios, Hollywood. Britney Spears' wins Video of the Year, Best Pop Video, and Best Female Video for "Piece of Me". Christina Aguilera also made her return to music since giving birth to her first child with the debut of her single Keeps Gettin' Better.
- September 10 – The 22nd Annual ARIA Music Awards are held in Sydney, Australia, recognizing Australian music in 2008. Dance-punk group The Presets win Album of the Year.
- September 11 – Christian Älvestam leaves Scar Symmetry.
- September 18
  - Soilwork hires former member, Peter Wichers, to replace Daniel Antonsson, who is fired.
  - Ben Folds Five play a sold out reunion show in Chapel Hill, North Carolina, performing the entirety of their 1999 album The Unauthorized Biography of Reinhold Messner, that was filmed for DVD and web release by MySpace in benefit for Operation Smile
  - Crystal Castles play their biggest headline show to date, at Electric Ballroom in Camden, London.
- September 19 – "Only by the Night" the fourth studio album by American alternative rock band Kings of Leon, released worldwide in September 2008. – Travis Barker and Adam Goldstein (DJ AM) survive a plane crash that claims four lives.
- September 20 – P!nk scores her first solo number-one hit in her native US, with "So What".
- September 21
  - At the Gates play their final show.
  - The Eric Burdon show in Oklahoma is cancelled due to his health problems.
- September 24 – Within Temptation release the Black Symphony DVD, featuring the Metropole Orchestra and guest musicians.
- September 25 – Paul McCartney performs at Tel Aviv park, his first performance in Israel since The Beatles were banned from the country in 1965.

=== October ===
- October 1 – Tina Turner leaves semi-retirement to embark on her Tina!: 50th Anniversary Tour, which grosses over US $130 million.
- October 5 – Stephanie Jeong wins the Second Prize (no First Prize is awarded) in the Premio Paganini international violin competition in Genoa.
- October 7 – Spotify on-demand music streaming service launches in Sweden.
- October 10 – The Fourth Waakirchener Zither Festival takes place in Waakirchen, Bavaria.
- October 12 – Opening of the VII Festival Internazionale di Musica e Arte Sacra, in Rome and the Vatican City (until November 30).
- October 16 – Britney Spears sets a new record for the biggest jump to number one on the Billboard Hot 100, rising from number 96 to number one in just one week, with her single "Womanizer". It is Spears' first American number one since her debut single "...Baby One More Time". (The record is subsequently broken by Kelly Clarkson). It also garners first-week download sales of 286,000, the biggest opening-week tally by a female artist.
- October 18 – Rihanna scores her fifth number one song on the Billboard Hot 100 (as a featured artist on T.I.'s "Live Your Life", which follows "SOS", "Umbrella", "Take a Bow", and "Disturbia"), becoming the leading solo female artist with the most number ones to have charted in this decade until Beyoncé Knowles breaks her record (as a solo artist).
- Justin Bieber signed with L.A. Reid Island Records

=== November ===
- November 1–9 – The Southbank Centre in London, UK presents "Klang: A Tribute to Stockhausen", a festival curated by Oliver Knussen, with a series of concerts focusing on works from the composer's last decade, including the world premieres of Urantia and Zodiac for Orchestra, as well as late-night performances, lectures, and master classes.
- November 2 – The Fauxharmonic Orchestra loses in its debut confrontation with the Baltimore Chamber Orchestra in a Bargemusic concert.
- November 4 – Bhimsen Joshi is selected to receive the Bharat Ratna, India's highest civilian honour.
- November 6 – Michael Tilson Thomas makes his Philadelphia Orchestra subscription-concert conducting debut.
- November 17 – Korean violinist Hyun-Su Shin wins First Prize in the Jacques Thibaud International Violin Competition in Paris
- November 23 – 13 years after his disappearance, Manic Street Preachers guitarist Richey Edwards is declared dead in absentia.
  - Wes Carr is crowned the winner of the sixth season of Australian Idol, defeating Luke Dickens.
- November 24 – The Royal Philharmonic Orchestra announces the appointment of Pinchas Zukerman as principal guest conductor, to begin in January 2009.

=== December ===
- December 9 – Damon Albarn and Graham Coxon say that Blur will reunite for a concert at Hyde Park on July 3, 2009. Tickets for the concert sell out within two minutes of release, and Blur announce another date on July 2, 2009.
- December 11 – Elliott Carter celebrates his 100th birthday.
- December 13 – Beyoncé Knowles scores her fifth number one song on the Billboard Hot 100 with "Single Ladies (Put a Ring on It)", which followed "Crazy in Love", "Baby Boy", "Check on It", and "Irreplaceable", tying with Rihanna as the leading solo female artist with the most number ones to have charted in this decade.
  - Alexandra Burke is named winner of the fifth series of The X Factor UK. JLS are named runner-ups, while Eoghan Quigg and Diana Vickers finish in third and fourth place respectively.
- December 22 – Live Nation announce that Madonna's Sticky & Sweet Tour is the highest-grossing tour for a solo artist, with US$280 million in ticket sales and 2,350,282 fans attending the 58 shows during the three-leg tour across Europe and the Americas.

== Bands formed ==
- See Category:Musical groups established in 2008

== Bands reformed ==
See Category:Musical groups reestablished in 2008

== Returning performers ==
- AC/DC (first album since 2000)
- Vanessa Amorosi (debut international album and first Australian album since 1999)
- Anastacia (last studio album released in 2004)
- As Friends Rust (reformed after breaking up in 2002)
- Ashanti (last studio album released in 2004)
- Ashlee Simpson (last studio album released in 2005)
- Billy Bragg (first studio album since 2002, first under his own name since 1996)
- Bomb the Bass (first full-length album since 1995)
- Boyzone (first studio album released in 1999)
- Brandy (last studio album released in 2004)
- David Byrne & Brian Eno (first album since 1981)
- Cherry Poppin' Daddies (first album since 2000)
- Counting Crows (first studio album since 2002)
- The Cure (first studio album since 2004)
- Dido (last studio album released in 2003)
- Donna Summer (first studio album since 1991)
- Erykah Badu (first album since 2003)
- Extreme (first studio album since 1995)
- Grace Jones (first studio album since 1989)
- Guns N' Roses (first album of original material since 1991)
- Jason Donovan (first studio album since 1993)
- Lenny Kravitz (first album since 2004)
- Metallica (first album since 2003)
- Mötley Crüe (first album with all members since 1997)
- New Kids on the Block (first album since 1994)
- The Offspring (first album since 2003)
- Paramore (first album since 2007)
- Polvo (first tour since 1998)
- Portishead (First record since 1997)
- Queen (first studio album since 1995, and first with Paul Rodgers on lead vocals)
- The Screaming Jets (first studio album since 2000)
- Sixpence None the Richer (first studio album since 2002)
- The Specials (as "Terry Hall and Friends")
- Third Eye Blind (first single/release since 2003)
- Toadies (first album since 2001)
- The Verve (first album since 1997)

== Bands disbanded ==
See Musical groups disestablished in 2008

== Bands on hiatus ==
- ¡Forward, Russia! (indefinite hiatus)
- Big & Rich (until 2009, due to a neck injury suffered by Big Kenny)
- The Dresden Dolls
- From Autumn to Ashes
- Hell Is for Heroes
- Incubus (on break from touring and recording)
- Monkey Swallows the Universe (indefinite hiatus)
- My Chemical Romance (on an extended break after a US tour)
- Kaddisfly (on hiatus after bassist Kile Brewer left; remaining members now called Waters & Bodies)
- Phantom Planet
- Red Hot Chili Peppers (two-year hiatus)
- Rilo Kiley (due to the success of lead singer Jenny Lewis' solo career)
- Social Distortion (due to their lead singer undertaking a solo tour)
- The Starting Line (indefinite break)
- Velvet Revolver (while looking for a new lead singer)
- Westlife (a one year break)
- Wolfmother (whilst looking for new musicians)
- Yellowcard (indefinitely)

== Albums released ==
Best-selling albums globally & United States

The best-selling records in 2008 according to IFPI:

Position	Album title	Artist
1	Viva la Vida or Death and All His Friends	Coldplay
2	Black Ice	AC/DC
3	Thriller 25	Michael Jackson
4	Rockferry	Duffy
5	Death Magnetic	Metallica
6	Spirit	Leona Lewis
7	Back to Black	Amy Winehouse
8	High School Musical 3: Senior Year	Various Artists
9	Tha Carter III	Lil Wayne
10	Good Girl Gone Bad	Rihanna

The best-selling albums in the United States:

Position	Album title	Artist
1	Tha Carter III	Lil' Wayne
2	Viva la Vida or Death and All His Friends	Coldplay
3	Fearless	Taylor Swift
4	Rock N Roll Jesus	Kid Rock
5	Black Ice	AC/DC
6	Taylor Swift	Taylor Swift
7	Death Magnetic	Metallica
8	Paper Trail	T.I.
9	Sleep Through the Static	Jack Johnson
10	I Am... Sasha Fierce	Beyoncé

== Songs released in 2008 ==
Date	Song	Artist
January 1	Smog	Bomb the Bass
January 15	Pocketful of Sunshine	Natasha Bedingfield
January 25	Bust It Baby (Part 1)	Plies featuring Ne-Yo
January 29	Funplex	The B-52s
January 29	Nine in the Afternoon	Panic at the Disco
February 5	Day 'n' Nite	Kid Cudi vs. Crookers
February 5	Run the Show	Kat DeLuna featuring Busta Rhymes
February 11	Paper Planes	M.I.A.
February 12	Elevator	Flo Rida featuring Timbaland
February 19	It's Not My Time	3 Doors Down
February 23	Bust It Baby (Part 2)	Plies featuring Ne-Yo
February 26	The Way That I Love You	Ashanti
February 28	A-Punk	Vampire Weekend
March 4	Break the Ice	Britney Spears
March 11	Little Miss Obsessive	Ashlee Simpson
March 17	4 Minutes	Madonna featuring Justin Timberlake and Timbaland
March 17	I Keep Faith	Billy Bragg
March 24	No Stress	Laurent Wolf
March 25	Mad as Rabbits	Panic at the Disco
March 31	American Boy	Estelle featuring Kanye West
April 8	Just Dance	Lady Gaga featuring Colby O'Donis
April 15	Closer	Ne-Yo
April 15	I'm Yours	Jason Mraz
April 15	Take a Bow	Rihanna
April 28	I Kissed a Girl	Katy Perry
April 29	Forever	Chris Brown
May 2	If I Never See Your Face Again	Maroon 5 featuring Rihanna
May 2	That Green Gentleman (Things Have Changed)	Panic at the Disco
May 9	Violet Hill	Coldplay
May 13	The Greatest Man That Ever Lived (Variations on a Shaker Hymn)	Weezer
May 19	Train	3 Doors Down
May 20	In the Ayer	Flo Rida featuring will.i.am
May 25	Viva la Vida	Coldplay
May 26	Oxford Comma	Vampire Weekend
May 27	Dreamin'	Weezer
May 27	When I Grow Up	The Pussycat Dolls
June 10	One Step at a Time	Jordin Sparks
June 10	Body on Me	Nelly featuring Akon and Ashanti
June 16	Pork and Beans	Weezer
June 17	Disturbia	Rihanna
June 17	7 Things	Miley Cyrus
June 19	Burnin' Up	Jonas Brothers featuring Big Rob
July 15	The Champion in Me	3 Doors Down
July 16	Good Good	Ashanti
July 26	Troublemaker	Weezer
July 29	Let it Rock	Kevin Rudolf featuring Lil Wayne
August 8	Make It Mine	Jason Mraz
August 11	So What	Pink
August 18	Cape Cod Kwassa Kwassa	Vampire Weekend
August 21	The Day That Never Comes	Metallica
August 28	Rock N' Roll Train	AC/DC
September 4	Sex on Fire	Kings of Leon
September 4	You're Gonna Go Far, Kid	The Offspring
September 9	Hot n Cold	Katy Perry
September 9	Whatcha Think About That	The Pussycat Dolls featuring Missy Elliott
September 19	Running Back	Jessica Mauboy featuring Flo Rida
September 23	Live Your Life	T.I. featuring Rihanna
September 23	Right Now (Na Na Na)	Akon
September 26	Poker Face	Lady Gaga
September 29	Gotta Be Somebody	Nickelback
September 29	Pieces	Chase & Status ft. Plan B
September 30	Gives You Hell	The All-American Rejects
October 3	Womanizer	Britney Spears
October 6	Rehab	Rihanna featuring Justin Timberlake
October 8	If I Were a Boy	Beyoncé
October 10	I Can Feel You	Anastacia
October 12	Out of this Club	The Pussycat Dolls featuring R. Kelly and Polow da Don
October 13	Single Ladies (Put a Ring on It)	Beyoncé
October 14	I Hate This Part	The Pussycat Dolls
October 21	Decode	Paramore
November 3	Crying Blood	V V Brown
November 3	Lovers in Japan	Coldplay
November 3	Sober	Pink
November 10	Lost!	Coldplay
November 14	Northern Downpour	Panic at the Disco
November 24	Breakeven	The Script
December 1	Lhuna	Coldplay featuring Kylie Minogue
December 2	Circus	Britney Spears
December 2	Let Me Be Myself	3 Doors Down
December 9	Use Somebody	Kings of Leon
December 17	Hallelujah	Alexandra Burke
December 18	Big Jack	AC/DC

== Hit records ==
=== United States ===
Singles which have ranked within Top 10 within the Billboard Hot 100 Hits (excludes those that were #1 in the UK)

- "4 Minutes" – Madonna featuring Justin Timberlake and Timbaland (#3)
- "7 Things" – Miley Cyrus (#9)
- "American Boy" – Estelle featuring Kanye West (#9)
- "Burnin' Up" – Jonas Brothers (#5)
- "Bust It Baby Part 2" – Plies featuring Ne-Yo (#7)
- "Can't Believe It" – T-Pain featuring Lil Wayne (#7)
- "Change" – Taylor Swift (#10)
- "Circus" – Britney Spears (#3)
- "Closer" – Ne-Yo (#7)
- "Crank That (Soulja Boy)" – Soulja Boy Tell'em (#5 – Hit No. 1 in 2007)
- "Crush" – David Archuleta (#2)
- "Damaged" – Danity Kane featuring Diddy (#10)
- "Dangerous" – Kardinal Offishall featuring Akon (#5)
- "Dangerouz" – Sarah Burgess (#8)
- "Day 'n' Nite" – Kid Cudi (#3)
- "Disturbia" – Rihanna (#1)
- "Fearless" – Taylor Swift (#9)
- "Forever" – Chris Brown (#2)
- "Gotta Be Somebody" – Nickelback (#10)
- "Got Money" – Lil Wayne featuring T-Pain (#10)
- "Hate That I Love You" – Rihanna featuring Ne-Yo (#10 – Hit No. 7 in 2007)
- "Heartless" – Kanye West (#4)
- "Hot n Cold" – Katy Perry (#3)
- "I Kissed a Girl" – Katy Perry (#1)
- "If I Were a Boy" – Beyoncé (#3)
- "I'm Yours" – Jason Mraz (#6)
- "In the Ayer" – Flo Rida featuring will.i.am (#9)
- "Independent" – Webbie featuring Lil Boosie and Lil Phat (#9)
- "Just Dance" – Lady Gaga featuring Colby O'Donis (#3 — Hit No. 1 in 2009)
- "Keeps Gettin' Better" – Christina Aguilera (#7)
- "Kiss Kiss" – Chris Brown featuring T-Pain (#4 – Hit No. 1 in 2007)
- "Leavin'" – Jesse McCartney (#10)
- "Let It Rock" – Kevin Rudolf featuring Lil Wayne (#5)
- "Live Your Life" – T.I. featuring Rihanna (#1)
- "Lollipop" – Lil Wayne featuring Static Major (#1)
- "Love Lockdown" – Kanye West (#3)
- "Love in This Club" – Usher featuring Jeezy (#1)
- "Love Song" – Sara Bareilles (#4)
- "Love Story" – Taylor Swift (#5)
- "Low" – Flo Rida featuring T-Pain (#1)
- "A Milli" – Lil Wayne (#6)
- "Miss Independent" – Ne-Yo (#7)
- "New Soul" – Yael Naïm" (#7)
- "No Air" – Jordin Sparks featuring Chris Brown (#3)
- "Paper Planes" – M.I.A. (#4)
- "Pocketful of Sunshine" – Natasha Bedingfield (#5)
- "Right Now (Na Na Na)" – Akon (#8)
- "See You Again" – Miley Cyrus (#10)
- "Sensual Seduction" – Snoop Dogg (#7)
- "Sexy Can I" – Ray J featuring Yung Berg (#3)
- "Shake It" – Metro Station (#10)
- "Shawty Get Loose" – Lil Mama featuring Chris Brown and T-Pain (#10)
- "Single Ladies (Put a Ring on It)" – Beyoncé (#1)
- "So What" – Pink (#1)
- "Sorry" – Buckcherry (#9)
- "Superstar" – Lupe Fiasco featuring Matthew Santos (#10)
- "Swagga Like Us" – T.I. featuring Kanye West, Jay-Z, and Lil Wayne (#5)
- "Take a Bow" – Rihanna (#1)
- "Take You There" – Sean Kingston (#7)
- "Tattoo" – Jordin Sparks (#8)
- "This Is Me" – Demi Lovato featuring Joe Jonas (#9)
- "The Time of My Life" – David Cook (#3)
- "Tonight" – Jonas Brothers (#8)
- "Touch My Body" – Mariah Carey (#1)
- "Viva la Vida – Coldplay (#1)
- "Whatever You Like – T.I. (#1)
- "When I Grow Up" – The Pussycat Dolls (#9)
- "With You" – Chris Brown (#2)
- "Womanizer" – Britney Spears (#1)

Billboard Year-End Hot 100 singles of 2008

=== United Kingdom ===
UK Official Top 75 No. 1 Hits

- "4 Minutes" – Madonna featuring Justin Timberlake and Timbaland (4 weeks)
- "All Summer Long" – Kid Rock (1 week)
- "American Boy" – Estelle featuring Kanye West (4 weeks)
- "Closer" – Ne-Yo (1 week)
- "Dance wiv Me" – Dizzee Rascal featuring Calvin Harris and Chrome (4 weeks)
- "Greatest Day" – Take That (1 week)
- "Hallelujah" – Alexandra Burke (2 weeks)
- "Hero" – The X Factor Finalists 2008 (3 weeks)
- "I Kissed a Girl" – Katy Perry (5 weeks)
- "If I Were a Boy" – Beyoncé (1 week)
- "Mercy" – Duffy (5 weeks)
- "Now You're Gone" – Basshunter (5 weeks)
- "The Promise" – Girls Aloud (1 week)
- "Run" – Leona Lewis (2 weeks)
- "Sex on Fire" – Kings of Leon (3 weeks)
- "Singin' in the Rain" – Mint Royale (2 weeks)
- "So What" – Pink (3 weeks)
- "Take a Bow" – Rihanna (2 weeks)
- "That's Not My Name" – The Ting Tings (1 week)
- "Viva la Vida" – Coldplay (1 week)
- "When You Believe" – Leon Jackson (1 week in 2007/2 weeks in 2008)

=== Australia ===
Australia Official Top 50 No. 1 Hits

Australia Official Top 50 Hits – Singles which have ranked within Top 20

=== Other international hits ===
- "About You Now" – The Saw Doctors
- "Algún día" – Julieta Venegas
- "Appelle mon numéro" – Mylène Farmer
- "Dégénération" – Mylène Farmer
- "Déjame Entrar (Makano song)" – Makano
- "Dos Mou Logo Na Sotho" – Mando
- "Ein Stern (...der deinen Namen trägt)" – DJ Ötzi and Nik P
- "Everything – P-Money
- "The Galway Girl" – Sharon Shannon and Mundy
- "Gansi" – Edo Maajka
- "Hakanaku mo Towa no Kanashi" – Uverworld
- "Hot Summer Night (Oh La La La)" – David Tavaré
- "Il avait les mots" – Sheryfa Luna
- "Jennie Let Me Love You" – E.M.D.
- "Kallai Mattum" – Hariharan
- "Me Estás Tentando" – Wisin & Yandel
- "Nekade Daleku" – Elena Risteska
- "Non ti scordar mai di me" – Giusy Ferreri
- "Pehli Nazar Mein" – Atif Aslam
- "Quédate" – Pee Wee
- "Rayon de soleil" – William Baldé
- "Scheiss Liebe" – LaFee
- "Tired of Being Sorry (Laisse le destin l'emporter)" – Enrique Iglesias & Nâdiya
- "Traicionera" – Américo

== Classical music ==
=== New works ===
- Birke J. Bertelsmeier – Quartettstück for string quartet
- Martin Bresnick – Joaquin is Dreaming
- Elliott Carter
  - Concerto for flute and orchestra
  - Duetto for violin and cello (first of the Due Duetti)
  - Tinntinabulation, for percussion sextet
  - Wind Rose, for wind ensemble
  - On Conversing with Paradise, for baritone and chamber orchestra
  - Poems of Louis Zukofsky, for mezzo-soprano and clarinet
- Joël-François Durand – Le Tombeau de Rameau, for flute, viola and harp
- Lorenzo Ferrero
  - Freedom Variations, for trumpet and chamber ensemble
  - 2 Agosto. Prima variazione (from Quatro variazioni su un tema di Banchieri), for organ and orchestra
- Jennifer Higdon – Violin Concerto
- Mehdi Hosseini – Concerto for String Quartet and Chamber Orchestra
- Karl Jenkins
  - Stabat Mater
  - Te Deum
- Wojciech Kilar
  - Paschalis Hymn for mixed choir a cappella
  - Te Deum, for 4 solo voices, choir and orchestra
  - Veni Creator, for mixed choir and string orchestra
- Arvo Pärt – Symphony No. 4
- Anno Schreier – Berceuse for violin, clarinet, alto saxophone and piano
- Tan Dun – Piano Concerto The Fire

=== New operas ===
- Harrison Birtwistle – The Minotaur
- Howard Shore – The Fly

== Musical films ==
- Annan Thambi
- Cadillac Records
- Dasavathaaram
- High School Musical 3: Senior Year
- Hannah Montana & Miley Cyrus: Best of Both Worlds Concert

== Musical television ==
- Beethoven Virus

== Births ==
- January 17 – Notti Osama, American rapper (d. 2022)
- February 22 - Emme Maribel Muñiz, son of Jennifer Lopez and Marc Anthony
- March 8 - Sugarhill Ddot, American rapper
- March 12 - Emma Kok, Dutch singer
- March 31 – Star Bandz, American rapper
- June 10 - Sara James, Polish singer and songwriter, represented Poland in the Junior Eurovision Song Contest in 2021
- July 22 – BabyChiefDoit, American rapper
- October 3 - Karolina Protsenko, Ukrainian-American pop violinist and youTube sensation
- October 24 – Liamani Segura, American singer and actress

== Deaths ==
=== January ===
- January 3 – Henri Chopin, 85, French sound poet
- January 10 – Dave Day, 66 (heart attack), American guitarist (The Monks)
- January 11 – Pete Candoli, 84 (prostate cancer), American jazz trumpeter
- January 13 – Sergejus Larinas, 51, Russian tenor
- January 17 – Madeleine Michaud, 105, French librettist
- January 19
  - Andy Palacio, 47, Belizean Punta musician
  - Trevor Taylor, 50 (heart attack), German singer (Bad Boys Blue)
  - John Stewart, 68, American singer-songwriter (The Kingston Trio)
- January 20 – Tommy McQuater, 93, British jazz trumpeter
- January 25 – Evelyn Barbirolli, 97, British oboist
- January 30 – Miles Kington, 66, British bassist

=== February ===
- February 3 – Jackie Orszaczky, 59, Hungarian jazz bass-guitarist and composer
- February 4 – Tata Güines, 77, Cuban percussionist and composer
- February 9 – Scot Halpin, 54, American drummer
- February 10
  - Freddie Bell, 76, American musician
  - Inga Nielsen, 61 (cancer), Danish soprano
- February 13 – Henri Salvador, 90 (ruptured aneurysm), French singer
- February 15 – Willie P. Bennett, 56 (heart attack), Canadian folk singer-songwriter
- February 19
  - Yegor Letov, 43 (heart stopped), Russian punk singer
  - Teo Macero, 82, American jazz saxophonist, record producer and composer
- February 21
  - Joe Gibbs, 65 (heart attack), Jamaican record producer
  - Neil Chotem, 87, Canadian conductor and composer
- February 24 – Larry Norman, 60, American musician
- February 25 – Stephen "Static Major" Garrett, 33, American rapper
- February 26 – Buddy Miles, 60, American drummer (Jimi Hendrix's Band of Gypsys)
- February 27
  - Ray Kane, 82, American slack-key guitarist
  - Ivan Rebroff, 76, German singer of traditional Russian music
- February 28
  - Mike Conley, 48, American punk singer (M.I.A.)
  - Mike Smith, 64 (pneumonia), British singer and producer (The Dave Clark Five)

=== March ===
- March 2 – Jeff Healey, 41 (cancer), Canadian blues guitarist
- March 3
  - Giuseppe Di Stefano, 86, Italian tenor
  - Norman Smith, 85, British record producer and musician
- March 4 – Leonard Rosenman, 83 (heart attack), American composer
- March 10 – Dennis Irwin, 56, American double-bass player
- March 12 – Alun Hoddinott, 78, British composer
- March 13 – Bill Bolick, 90, country musician (The Blue Sky Boys)
- March 15 – Mikey Dread, 53 (brain tumor), Jamaican reggae musician and broadcaster
- March 16
  - Ola Brunkert, 61 (injuries from fall), Swedish session drummer
  - Daniel MacMaster, 39 (Group A streptococcal infection), Canadian vocalist (Bonham)
- March 21
  - Klaus Dinger, 61, German drummer (Neu!)
  - Shusha Guppy, 72, Iranian folk-singer and composer
- March 22 – Cachao López, 89 (kidney failure), Cuban bassist
- March 23 – Neil Aspinall, 66 (lung cancer), British music industry executive
- March 29 – Allan Ganley, 77, British jazz drummer
- March 30 – Sean LeVert, 39, American vocalist (LeVert)

=== April ===
- April 6 – Larry Brown, 63 (respiratory condition), American vocalist (Harold Melvin & The Blue Notes)
- April 15
  - Sean Costello, 28 (drug overdose), American blues musician
  - Brian Davison, 65, British drummer (The Nice)
- April 17 – Danny Federici, 58 (melanoma), American rock multi-instrumentalist (E Street Band)
- April 20
  - Bebe Barron, 82, American electronic music pioneer
  - VL Mike, 30 (shot), American rap artist
- April 21 – Al Wilson, 68, American singer
- April 22 – Paul Davis, American singer-songwriter
- April 24
  - Tristram Cary, 82, British composer
  - Jimmy Giuffre, 86 (pneumonia), American jazz musician
- April 25 – Humphrey Lyttelton, 86, British jazz musician
- April 26 – Henry Brant, 94, American composer
- April 27 – Frances Yeend, 95, American soprano
- April 29 – Micky Waller, 66, British drummer

=== May ===
- May 4 – Kishan Maharaj, 84, Indian tabla player
- May 5 – Jerry Wallace, 79 (congestive heart failure), American country music singer
- May 6 – Franz Jackson, 95, American jazz saxophonist
- May 8
  - Eddy Arnold, 89, American country music singer
  - Larry Levine, 80, American audio engineer
- May 10 – Leyla Gencer, 79, Turkish soprano
- May 11
  - Dottie Rambo, 74 (bus accident), American gospel singer
  - John Rutsey, 54 or 55 (heart attack), Canadian drummer (Rush)
- May 15
  - Alexander Courage, 88, American composer
  - Bob Florence, 75, American jazz pianist
- May 17 – Wilfrid Mellers, 94, British musicologist and composer
- May 21 – Siegmund Nissel, 86, Austrian violinist
- May 23 – Utah Phillips, 73 (heart disease), American folk singer-songwriter
- May 24 – Jimmy McGriff, 72 (multiple sclerosis), American jazz organist
- May 25 – Camu Tao, 30 (lung cancer), rapper
- May 26 – Earle Hagen, 88, American composer
- May 28 – Danny Moss, 80, British jazz saxophonist
- May 30
  - Campbell Burnap, 68 (cancer), British jazz trombonist and broadcaster
  - Nat Temple, 94, British big band leader

=== June ===
- June 1 – Al Jones, 62, British folk musician
- June 2 – Bo Diddley, 79 (heart failure), American rock and roll and blues singer, songwriter and guitarist
- June 4 – Bill Finegan, 91, American jazz pianist and arranger
- June 8 – Šaban Bajramović, 72 (heart attack), Serbian Romani musician
- June 12 – Danny Davis, 83 (heart attack), American band leader
- June 14
  - Jamelão, 95 (multiple organ failure), Brazilian samba singer
  - Esbjörn Svensson, 44, Swedish jazz pianist (Scuba diving accident)
- June 16 – Margaret Kitchin, 94, Swiss pianist
- June 17 – Cyd Charisse, 86 (heart attack), American dancer and actress
- June 24 – Ira Tucker, 83 (cardiovascular disease), American gospel singer (The Dixie Hummingbirds)
- June 27
  - Raymond Lefèvre, 78, French easy listening musician
  - Daihachi Oguchi, 84 (car accident), Japanese drummer
  - Leonard Pennario, 83 (Parkinson's disease), American pianist
- June 30 – Ángel Tavira, 83 (kidney complications), Mexican violinist and composer

=== July ===
- July 1 – Mel Galley, 60 (esophagus cancer), British guitarist (Whitesnake, Trapeze, Finders Keepers and Phenomena)
- July 2 – Natasha Shneider, 52 (cancer), Russian keyboardist and vocalist
- July 3
  - Harald Heide-Steen Jr., 68 (lung cancer), Norwegian actor, comedian and jazz singer
  - Oliver Schroer, 52 (leukemia), Canadian fiddler and composer
- July 6 – Bobby Durham, 71, American jazz drummer
- July 7 – Hugh Mendl, 88, British record producer
- July 13 – Gerald Wiggins, 86, American jazz pianist
- July 16 – Jo Stafford, 90 (congestive heart failure), American singer
- July 18
  - Tauno Marttinen, 95, Finnish composer
  - Dennis Townhill, 83, British organist and composer
- July 20 – Artie Traum, 65, American folk musician and composer
- July 22 – Joe Beck, 62 (lung cancer), American jazz guitarist
- July 24 – Norman Dello Joio, 95, American composer
- July 25
  - Hiram Bullock, 52 (throat cancer), American jazz fusion guitarist
  - Johnny Griffin, 80 (heart attack), American jazz saxophonist
- July 27 – Horst Stein, 80, German conductor
- July 28 – Wendo Kolosoy, 83, Congolese rumba musician
- July 31 – Lee Young, 94, American jazz drummer and singer

=== August ===
- August 3
  - Erik Darling, 74, American folk musician
  - Louis Teicher, 83, American pianist
- August 4 – Nicola Rescigno, 92, Italian American conductor
- August 5
  - Robert Hazard, 59, American songwriter
  - Reg Lindsay, 79, Australian country music singer
- August 10
  - Isaac Hayes, 65, American rhythm and blues musician
  - Alexander Slobodyanik, 66, Ukrainian pianist
- August 11 – Don Helms, 81, American steel guitarist
- August 12 – Donald Erb, 81, American composer
- August 14 – Lita Roza, 82, British singer
- August 15 – Jerry Wexler, 91, American producer
- August 16
  - Dorival Caymmi, 94, Brazilian singer-songwriter
  - Ronnie Drew, 73, Irish folk musician (The Dubliners)
  - Johnny Moore, 70, Jamaican trumpeter (The Skatalites)
- August 18 – Pervis Jackson, 70, American R&B singer (The Spinners)
- August 19 – LeRoi Moore, 46, American saxophonist (Dave Matthews Band)
- August 20 – Phil Guy, 68, American blues guitarist
- August 21
  - Jerry Finn, 39, American record producer
  - Buddy Harman, 79, American session drummer
- August 25 – Pehr Henrik Nordgren, 64, Finnish composer
- August 31 – Jerry Reed, 71, American country musician

=== September ===
- September 2 – Arne Domnérus, 83, Swedish jazz saxophonist
- September 6 – Nicole Lai, 34 (skin cancer), Singaporean singer
- September 7
  - Christian Dudek, 42, German drummer (Sodom)
  - Dino Dvornik, 44, Croatian singer, songwriter and music producer
  - Peter Glossop, 80, British opera singer
- September 8
  - Bheki Mseleku, 53 (diabetes-related), jazz musician
  - Jason Stuart, 39, British keyboardist (Hawkwind)
  - Kunnakudi Vaidyanathan, 73, Indian violinist
  - Hector Zazou, 60, French composer and producer
- September 10 – Vernon Handley, 77, British conductor
- September 12
  - Marjorie Thomas, 85, British contralto
  - Charlie Walker, 81, American country musician
- September 15 – Richard Wright, 65, British keyboardist (Pink Floyd)
- September 16
  - Norman Whitfield, 68, American songwriter and producer
  - Andrei Volkonsky, 75, Russian (émigré/defector) composer, conductor and harpsichordist
- September 18
  - Opal Courtney Jr, 71, American R&B/doo-wop singer (The Spaniels)
  - Mauricio Kagel, 76, Argentine composer
- September 19
  - Earl Palmer, 84, American drummer, member of the Rock and Roll Hall of Fame
  - Dick Sudhalter, 70, American jazz trumpeter and critic
- September 20 – Nappy Brown, 78, American blues singer
- September 22 – Connie Haines, 87, American singer
- September 24 – Vice Vukov, 72, Croatian singer
- September 25 – Horațiu Rădulescu, 66, Romanian composer
- September 26
  - Bernadette Greevy, 68, Irish mezzo-soprano
  - Yonty Solomon, 71, South African pianist

=== October ===
- October 1 – Nick Reynolds, 75, American folk musician
- October 3 – Johnny "J", 39, American songwriter, music producer and rapper
- October 4
  - Levi Kereama, 27, Australian musician
  - Alfred Gallodoro, 95, American jazz musician
- October 9 – Gidget Gein, 39, American bassist (Marilyn Manson)
- October 10
  - Alton Ellis, 70, Jamaican rocksteady musician
  - Dave Wright, 64 (The Troggs)
- October 11
  - Russ Hamilton, 78, British singer
  - Neal Hefti, 85, American jazz trumpeter and composer
- October 13 – Gus Chambers, 52, British vocalist
- October 15 – Frankie Venom, 51, Canadian vocalist (Teenage Head)
- October 17 – Levi Stubbs, 72, American vocalist (The Four Tops)
- October 18
  - Peter Gordeno, 69, Burmese singer
  - Dave McKenna, 78, American jazz pianist
  - Dee Dee Warwick, 63, American soul singer
- October 24 – Merl Saunders, 74, American musician
- October 27 – Ray Ellis, 85, American musician
- October 29 – Mike Baker, 45, American singer (Shadow Gallery)
- October 31 – Frank Navetta, 46, American punk rock guitarist (Descendents)

=== November ===
- November 1
  - Jack Reno, 72, American country singer
  - Jimmy Carl Black, 70, American drummer (The Mothers of Invention)
  - Nathaniel Mayer, 64, American R&B singer
- November 4
  - Alan Hazeldine, 60, Scottish conductor and pianist
  - Byron Lee, 73, Jamaican musician
- November 7 – Jody Reynolds, 75, American singer
- November 10
  - Miriam Makeba, 76, South African singer
  - Wannes Van de Velde, 71, Belgian folk singer.
- November 12 – Mitch Mitchell, 61, British drummer (The Jimi Hendrix Experience)
- November 22 – MC Breed, 37, American rapper
- November 23 – Richard Hickox, 60, British conductor
- November 24
  - Michael Lee, 39, British drummer (The Cult)
  - Kenny MacLean, 52, Canadian bassist (Platinum Blonde)
- November 26 – Pekka Pohjola, 56, Finnish composer
- November 30 – Munetaka Higuchi, 49, Japanese drummer (Loudness)

=== December ===
- December 2 – Odetta, 77, American folk musician
- December 9
  - Steve Isham, 56, American keyboardist (Autograph)
  - Dennis Yost, 65, American vocalist (Classics IV)
- December 14 – Jay E. Welch, American music teacher and chorus director
- December 15
  - Davey Graham, 68, British guitarist
  - Sandeé, 46, American freestyle singer (Exposé) (Seizure)
- December 17
  - John Sean Byrne, 61, Irish guitarist (Count Five)
  - Feliciano Vierra Tavares, 88, American musician
- December 25
  - Eartha Kitt, 81, American singer and actress
  - Robert Ward, 70, American blues musician
- December 27 – Roque Cordero, 91, Panamanian composer
- December 28 – Vincent Ford, 68, Jamaican reggae songwriter
- December 29 – Freddie Hubbard, 70, American jazz trumpeter

== See also ==
- List of 2008 albums
- Timeline of musical events
