= 2008 in classical music =

== Events ==
- January 1 – Julia Fischer makes her début as a concert pianist, performing Edvard Grieg's Piano Concerto in A minor with the Junge Deutsche Philharmonie at the Alte Oper, Frankfurt. The concert was conducted by Matthias Pintscher, who replaced Sir Neville Marriner. On the same occasion she also performed the Violin Concerto no. 3 in B minor by Camille Saint-Saëns.
- January 5 – The Salzburg Festival launches the "Herbert von Karajan Jubilee Year" with a concert in Salzburg's Grosses Festspielhaus.
- April 22 – Andrey Baranov of Russia wins First Prize in the Second Benjamin Britten International Violin Competition in London.
- November 1–9 – The Southbank Centre in London, UK, presents "Klang: A Tribute to Stockhausen", a festival curated by Oliver Knussen, with a series of concerts focusing on works from the composer's last decade, including the world premieres of Urantia and Zodiac for Orchestra, as well as late-night performances, lectures, and master classes.
- November 6 – Michael Tilson Thomas makes his Philadelphia Orchestra subscription-concert conducting debut.
- November 17 – Korean violinist Hyun-Su Shin wins First Prize in the Jacques Thibaud International Violin Competition in Paris
- November 24 – The Royal Philharmonic Orchestra announces the appointment of Pinchas Zukerman as principal guest conductor, to begin in January 2009.
- December 4 – Elliott Carter's Interventions for Piano and Orchestra receives its premiere at Symphony Hall, Boston, United States, with Daniel Barenboim as the soloist.
- unknown date – The Annex String Quartet is formed in Toronto, Canada.

== New works ==
The following composers' works were composed, premiered, or published this year, as noted in the citation.

=== B ===
- Birke J. Bertelsmeier – Quartettstück for string quartet
- Martin Bresnick – Joaquin is Dreaming (for guitar)

=== C ===
- Elliott Carter
  - Flute Concerto
  - Duetto for violin and cello (first of the Due Duetti)
  - On Conversing with Paradise, for baritone and chamber orchestra
  - Poems of Louis Zukofsky, for mezzo-soprano and clarinet
  - Tinntinabulation, for percussion sextet
  - Wind Rose, for wind ensemble

=== D ===
- Joël-François Durand – Le Tombeau de Rameau, for flute, viola and harp

=== F ===
- Lorenzo Ferrero
  - Freedom Variations, for trumpet and chamber ensemble
  - 2 Agosto. Prima variazione (from Quatro variazioni su un tema di Banchieri), for organ and orchestra

=== H ===
- Jennifer Higdon – Violin Concerto (premiered 2009)
- Mehdi Hosseini – Concerto for String Quartet and Chamber Orchestra

=== J ===
- Karl Jenkins
  - Stabat Mater
  - Te Deum

=== K ===
- Wojciech Kilar
  - Paschalis Hymn for mixed choir a cappella
  - Te Deum, for 4 solo voices, choir and orchestra
  - Veni Creator, for mixed choir and string orchestra

=== P ===
- Arvo Pärt – Symphony No. 4 (premiered 2009)

=== S ===
- Anno Schreier – Berceuse (to words by Paul Verlaine) for violin, clarinet, alto-saxophone and piano

=== T ===
- Tan Dun – Piano Concerto The Fire

== Opera premieres ==
Operas which premiered in 2008 include:

- Louis Andriessen – La Commedia
- Harrison Birtwistle – The Minotaur
- Willem Jeths – Hôtel de Pékin
- Howard Shore – The Fly

== Albums ==
- Alpha and Omega (February) – Tonus Peregrinus
- Pagina de Buenos Aires – Fernando Otero
- Songs of Joy & Peace (October 14) – Yo-Yo Ma
- Stabat Mater (10 March) – Karl Jenkins
- Tarik O'Regan: Threshold of Night (9 September) – Conspirare

== Musical films ==
- Life. Support. Music.
- Yandé Codou, la griotte de Senghor

== Deaths ==
- January 13 – Sergejus Larinas, 51, Russian tenor
- January 25 – Evelyn Barbirolli, 97, British oboist
- February 10 – Inga Nielsen, 61 (cancer), Danish soprano
- February 21 – Neil Chotem, 87, Canadian conductor and composer
- February 27 – Ivan Rebroff, 76, German singer of traditional Russian music
- March 3 – Giuseppe Di Stefano, 86, Italian tenor
- March 4 – Leonard Rosenman, 83 (heart attack), American composer
- March 10 – Dennis Irwin, 56, American double-bass player
- March 12 – Alun Hoddinott, 78, Welsh composer
- April 24 – Tristram Cary, 82, British composer
- April 26 – Henry Brant, 94, American composer
- April 27 – Frances Yeend, 95, American soprano
- May 15 – Alexander Courage, 88, American composer
- May 17 – Wilfrid Mellers, 94, British musicologist and composer
- May 21 – Siegmund Nissel, 86, Austrian violinist
- June 16 – Margaret Kitchin, 94, Swiss pianist
- June 19 – Antonio Bibalo, 86. Italian-born pianist and composer
- June 27 – Leonard Pennario, 83, American pianist (Parkinson's disease)
- July 18
  - Tauno Marttinen, 95, Finnish composer
  - Dennis Townhill, 83, British organist and composer
- July 24 – Norman Dello Joio, 95, American composer
- July 27 – Horst Stein, 80, German conductor
- August 3 – Louis Teicher, 83, American pianist
- August 4 – Nicola Rescigno, 92, Italian American conductor
- August 10 – Alexander Slobodyanik, 66, Ukrainian pianist
- August 12 – Donald Erb, 81, American composer
- August 25 – Pehr Henrik Nordgren, 64, Finnish composer
- September 7 – Peter Glossop, 80, British opera singer
- September 10 – Vernon Handley, 77, British conductor
- September 16 – Andrei Volkonsky, 75, Russian (émigré/defector) composer, conductor and harpsichordist
- September 25 – Horațiu Rădulescu, 66, Romanian composer
- September 26
  - Bernadette Greevy, 68, Irish mezzo-soprano
  - Yonty Solomon, 71, South African pianist
- November 4 – Alan Hazeldine, 60, Scottish conductor and pianist
- November 23 – Richard Hickox, 60, British conductor
- November 26 – Pekka Pohjola, 56, Finnish composer
- December 27 – Roque Cordero, 91, Panamanian composer

== Major awards ==
=== Classical Brits ===
- Male of the Year — Sir Colin Davis
- Female of the Year — Anna Netrebko
- Young British Classical Performer — Nicola Benedetti
- Album of the Year — Blake – Blake
- Soundtrack of the Year — Blood Diamond – James Newton Howard
- Critics' Award — Steven Isserlis – Bach: Cello Suites
- Lifetime Achievement In Music — Andrew Lloyd Webber

=== Grammy Awards ===
- See 51st Grammy Awards

== See also ==
- 2008 in music
