= Jorge Guillén =

Spanish poet

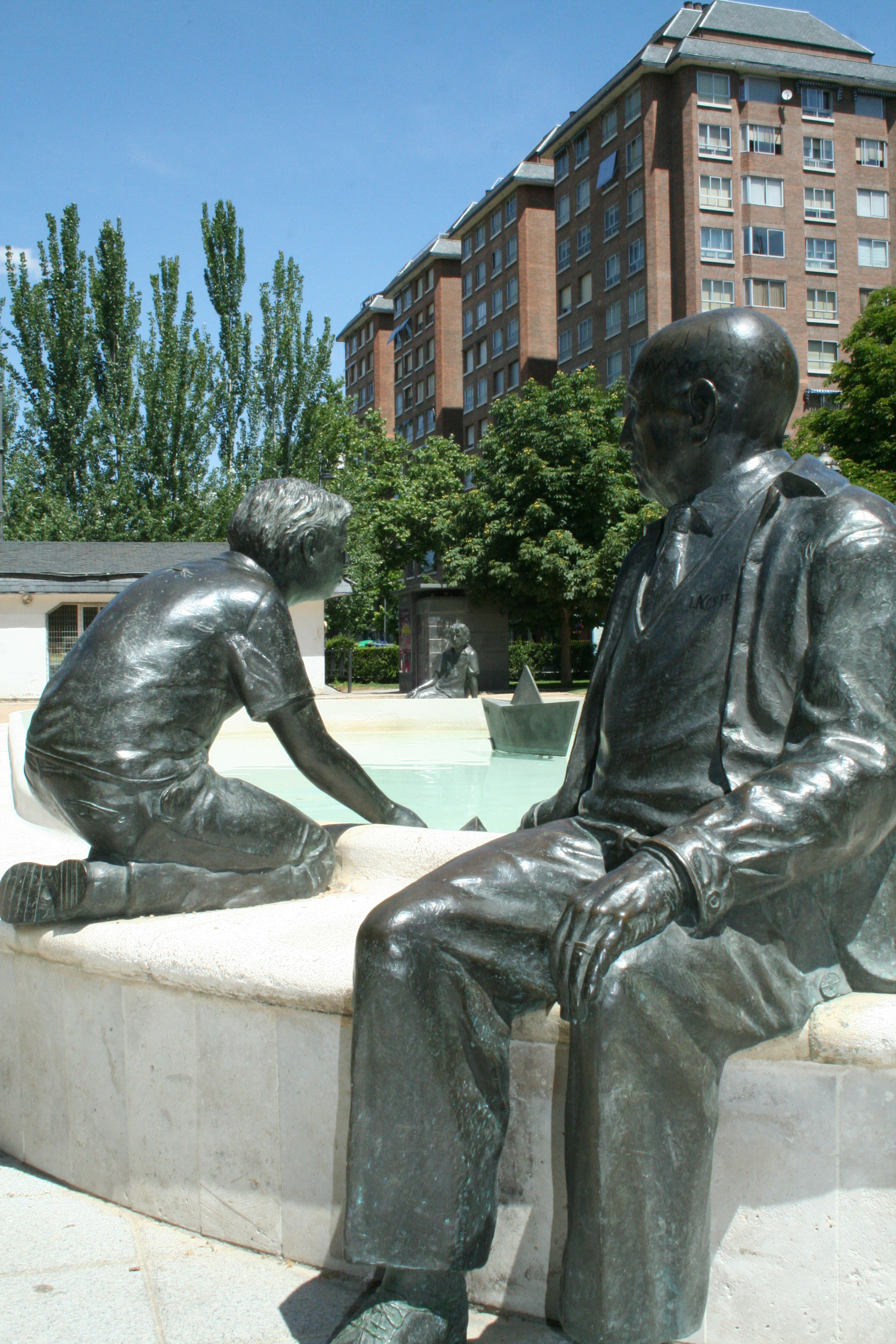
- Sculpture of Jorge Guillén in los Jardines del Poniente de Valladolid
- Born: Jorge Guillén Álvarez; 18 January 1893; Valladolid, Spain
- Died: 6 February 1984 (aged 91); Málaga, Spain
- Spouses: Germaine Cahen (m. 1924; died 1947) Irene Mochi-Sismondi (m. 1958) – d. 1984
- Children: Claudio Guillén, Teresa Gilman née Guillén
- Awards: Premio Cervantes, Premio Internacional Alfonso Reyes, Hijo Predilecto de Andalucía, Ollin Yoliztli Prize

Jorge Guillén Álvarez (Spanish pronunciation: [ˈxoɾxe ɣiˈʎen]; 18 January 1893 – 6 February 1984) was a Spanish poet, a member of the Generation of '27, a university teacher, a scholar and a literary critic.

In 1957–1958, he delivered the Charles Eliot Norton lectures at Harvard University, which were published in 1961 under the title Language and Poetry: Some Poets of Spain. The final lecture was a tribute to his colleagues in the Generation of '27. In 1983, he was named Hijo Predilecto de Andalucía. He was nominated for the Nobel Prize in Literature four times.

== Biography ==
Jorge Guillén was born in Valladolid where he spent his childhood and adolescence. From 1909 to 1911 he lived in Switzerland. He studied at the universities of Madrid – lodging in the Residencia de Estudiantes – and Granada, where he took his licenciatura in philosophy in 1913. His life paralleled that of his friend Pedro Salinas, whom he succeeded as a Spanish lector at the Collège de Sorbonne in the University of Paris from 1917 to 1923. While in Paris, he met and, in 1921, married Germaine Cahen. They had two children, a son Claudio born in 1924 who became a noted critic and scholar of comparative literature, and a daughter Teresa who married the Harvard professor Stephen Gilman.

He took his doctorate at the University of Madrid in 1924 with a dissertation on Góngora's notoriously difficult and, at that time, neglected long poem Polifemo. This was also the period when his first poems were starting to be published in España and La pluma. He was appointed to the chair of Spanish Literature at the University of Murcia from 1925 to 1929, where, with Juan Guerrero Ruiz and José Ballester Nicolás, he founded and edited a literary magazine called Verso y Prosa.

He continued to visit the Residencia de Estudiantes although his academic responsibilities limited his attendance to vacations. This allowed him to make the acquaintance of the younger members of the Generation – such as Rafael Alberti and Federico García Lorca. He became a regular correspondent of the latter and, on the occasion of a visit by Lorca to the Arts Club of Valladolid in April 1926, Guillén delivered an introduction to a poetry reading which was a considered and sympathetic appraisal of a man whom he considered to be already a poetic genius, although he had only published one collection.

He also participated in the Tercentenary celebrations in honour of Góngora. The volume of Octavas that he was supposed to edit, however, was never completed but he did give a reading of some of his own poems at an event in Seville with great success.

He became the lector at Oxford University from 1929 to 1931, and was appointed to a professorship at the University of Seville in 1932. On 8 March 1933, he was present at the premiere in Madrid of García Lorca's play Bodas de sangre. In August 1933, he was able to attend performances at the Magdalena Palace in Santander by the travelling theatre company La Barraca that Lorca led. On 12 July 1936 he was present at a party in Madrid that took place just before García Lorca departed to Granada for the last time before his murder. It was there that Lorca read his new play La Casa de Bernarda Alba for the last time.

On the outbreak of the Spanish Civil War in July 1936 he was back in Valladolid and was briefly imprisoned in Pamplona by Francoists for political reasons. He returned to his post in Seville and continued there until July 1938, when he decided to go into exile in the USA together with his wife and two teenage children. Apart from the turmoil in Spain itself, the fact that his wife was Jewish might have caused him concern.

He joined Salinas at Wellesley College and stayed there as the Professor of Spanish from 1941 to his retirement in 1957. He retired to Italy. In 1958 in Florence he married Irene Mochi-Sismondi, his first wife having died in 1947. He continued to give lectures at Harvard, Princeton and Puerto Rico, and for a spell was Mellon Professor of Spanish at the University of Pittsburgh, until he broke his hip in a fall in 1970. In 1976 he moved to the city of Málaga.

In 1976, he was awarded the Miguel de Cervantes Prize, the most prestigious prize for Spanish-language writers, and in 1977 the Premio Internacional Alfonso Reyes. He died in Málaga in 1984, aged 91 and was buried there in the Anglican Cemetery of Saint George.

== Analysis of his work ==
=== Cántico ===
==== 1928 edition ====
Although a glimpse at the collected poems of Guillén suggests that he was a prolific poet, he was slow to get started. He only seems to have started writing poems when he was in Paris in 1919 when he was already 25. Over the next 10 years he published quite frequently in the small magazines of the day and began to build a name for himself amongst the members of his generation, including Dámaso Alonso and Federico García Lorca. As early as 1923 Pedro Salinas urged him to publish a collection but he would not be hurried. Two of his key character traits are revealed by this long gestation period: his quest for perfection and an innate reserve. He was in fact the last of the major figures of the generation to gather together a collection, the first instalment of Cántico- at this stage a collection of 75 poems – which was published by the Revista de Occidente (a journal edited by Ortega y Gasset) in 1928. He was by this time 35.

Correspondence with García Lorca shows just how painstaking he was, spending months polishing, revising and correcting poems that he had already written and published, to a point where they were practically unrecognisable from the way they had first appeared in public. Clarity and coherence were his major objectives but he also seemed to wish to avoid obvious self-revelation and any hint of sentimentality. Lorca's reaction in a postcard to Guillén written on 27 December 1928 captures the elements that dominate most critical responses to the latter's poetry: an opposition between the jubilant, physical celebration of reality that his poems try to capture and, on the other hand, its extreme technical purity, which can seem cold and overly intellectual.

During his time in Paris, Guillén had come under the influence of Paul Valéry. Valéry was closely associated with the ideal of pure poetry and Guillén later recalled him saying that "Pure poetry is what is left after the elimination of everything that is not poetry." He was also inspired by Valéry's belief that a poet should only write one book – Un, qui est le bon et le seul de son être - a remark that makes sense of Guillén's career, both of the accretive process that led ultimately to the finished Cántico, and also of the impulse that led him to combine all his published poetry into one collection Aire nuestro in 1968. He also translated four of Valéry's poems, including the celebrated "Le Cimetière marin," into Spanish. However, in Language and Poetry, he also recorded a debt to the poetic rigour of Góngora, showing that he could trace this concern for stylistic purity back much further than Valéry.

Even in his earliest poems, such as "Gran silencio", the language is impersonal; the poet does not make any appearance in the poem. His poems offer an ecstatic reaction to the geometrical forms or the objects they describe but this is a generic reaction not Guillén's personal response. He is like an aesthetician or philosopher presenting things for the reader's edification. In "La salida", the only verbs that occur are infinitives. This means that what is described has no specific agent or time, again helping Guillén to become anonymous and guard against sentimentality. Like Valéry, he also writes poems that reflect upon poetry itself, for example "El ruiseñor" and "La rosa", both written in Guillén's favourite form, the décima, typically a stanza of 10 octosyllabic lines rhyming ABBAACCDDC, although he used many variations, such as a rhyme scheme borrowed from the French dizain, ABABCCDEED.

However, although Valéry,

read and reread with great devotion by the Castilian poet, was a model of exemplary elevation of subject matter and of exemplary rigor of style,

Guillén concludes by saying that Cántico

can be defined negatively as the antithesis of Valéry's Charmes.

Guillén stresses a determination to treat poetry as creation, a poem as a world in quintessence. For Valéry, poetry is a process of self-discovery, an exercise in consciousness, working out what it means to be an individual poet exploring reality. Guillén accepts reality for what it is and he wants to show what he has in common with other humans in the timeless experience of being. It is a phenomenology that derives from Ortega y Gasset as exemplified in his work Meditaciones del Quijote.

==== 1936 edition ====
The next edition of Cántico contained 125 poems. It was published by Cruz y Raya – a journal edited by José Bergamín – in 1936. While many members of his generation had suffered some form of crisis towards the end of the 1920s – amongst them Alberti, Garcia Lorca, Aleixandre, Cernuda – there were no signs of personal upheaval or radical change in Guillén's approach to poetry. Instead there is a deepening of the approach to reality contained in the first edition. Reality is potentially perfect. All it requires is the active participation of an onlooker to raise it to its full potency as explained by Ortega in the Meditaciones.

There is stylistic development as well in that some of the new poems are lengthy; "Salvación de la primavera" amounts to 55 quatrains (220 lines) and "Más allá", which eventually became the very first book in the collection, consists of 50 quatrains. There are also more medium-length poems of around 40-50 lines, such as "Viento saltado" and "El desterrado", most of which were written or started during Guillén's period of residence at Oxford. The collection is grouped into 5 sections, frequently book-ended by these longer poems, so that it has a more formally pleasing shape. The versification is also more varied; there are many more romances (octosyllabic lines with assonance in the even-numbered lines); Guillén starts to write sonnets; he introduces longer lines and also the assonantal quatrains of the longer poems.

The longer poems are inevitably less abstract and impersonal but they do not show any real break with his approach to poetry. In place of the concentrated focus on one object or small group of objects, the longer poems have scope for a more comprehensive assessment of exterior reality. Instead of flashes of ecstasy, the pursuit of plenitude and essence is an ongoing quest. The poetry continues to avoid anecdotal narrative but the greater circumstantial and temporal definition of the longer poems gives this edition an enhanced awareness of human contact with the real world. There is in addition a far more detailed examination of big themes such as love – "Salvación de la primavera" – and death – "Muerte a lo lejos" – although the poet takes a very detached view of death. It will happen one day and until then, he can enjoy life in the present.

Some of the new poems have epigraphs from Walt Whitman, such as "El desterrado". He might have come across Whitman during his time in France but his interest seems to have been consolidated during his Oxford period. There are overlaps between Whitman's poetry and the thinking of Ortega as enshrined in his famous formula Yo soy yo y mi circunstancia from the Meditaciones, in other words I am the sum of my individual self and the things that surround me/that I perceive. This is perhaps explained most fully in "Viento saltado", which he began in Oxford in 1931. It is a clear example of one of Guillén's stylistic characteristics, the use of exclamations. Everything in the poem is an exclamation as he displays an almost childlike delight at being buffeted by a blustery wind.

==== 1945 edition ====
A lot happened in Guillén's life before he published the next edition of Cántico in Mexico in 1945. By now the book had more than doubled in size, to 270 poems. A reader would expect events such as the mysterious death of his friend García Lorca, the Spanish Civil War, exile to the US and the Second World War to have an effect on Guillén's poetry. Exile in particular seems to have hit him hard because he did not speak very good English and he remained very attached to his Spanish background. But biographical references in his poems remain elusive. There is in this edition an increase in the number of poems that deal with pain and death. He also oscillates between extremes in a new and different way; some poems are stridently affirmative of his values while others are far more meditative and tranquil than hitherto. There are poems that deal with simple domestic pleasures, such as the home, family life, friendship and parenthood, which do not have any counterpart in the earlier editions.

There are stylistic innovations. In Language and Poetry, one of the lectures is about the prosaic language of the mediaeval poet Gonzalo de Berceo, whom Guillén admired for his humility and faith. In the poem "Equilibrio", there is a plainness of syntax, compared with earlier poems, that seems to suggest that he is trying to emulate this. There are poems which suggest that Guillén feels that he is now living in an alien environment, such as "Vida urbana".

There is also the emergence of the theme of pain and suffering. Sometimes pain prevents the realization of plenitude, as in "Muchas gracias, adiós"; sometimes awareness of pain and death can help to remind the poet of the importance of fighting for life. Although there are very few autobiographical references in Cántico, in this edition it is tempting to see references to the protracted illness and frequent hospital visits of his wife before her death in 1947, as well as the poet's own bouts of ill health. In "Su persona", he argues that loneliness is not to be defeated by turning to memories of shared joys, because they are merely phantasms. Instead, you have to face reality and find the good that exists there. In this edition, Guillén acknowledges that reality has a dark side but affirms that it can be resisted and must be resisted.

==== 1950 the final edition ====
The completed version contained 334 poems and was published in Buenos Aires. Amongst the new poems are ten very long ones that exemplify Guillén's search for clarity and cohesion. "A vista de hombre", for example, was begun in a New York hotel and deals with a view of an unnamed metropolis from a skyscraper. It develops the poet's thoughts on his relationship with the mass of people living and working in this city until it closes with the poet retiring to his bed. Unlike García Lorca in Poeta en Nueva York or countless other poets, the city is not inhuman, cold, abstract. The emphasis is on the mass of humanity it holds. The city is a mix of good and evil, man's heroic endeavours and barbarity – a reality that has to be embraced in totality even when you cannot understand it. The poet is both an isolated individual in a hotel room and a member of this society.

Others of the new poems also echo this theme, showing that Guillén does not want to reject modern urban life but instead to find a way of incorporating it into his affirmative scheme.

Although various poems evoke Murcia, Oxford and Manhattan, "Luz natal" contains the only place name in the whole of Cántico, el cerro de San Cristóbal, a hill outside Valladolid which he visited in 1949 to see his sick father. It is a meditation on the significance of this place, from which he began his journey towards reality and from which he still takes his bearings. It adds a new dimension to Guillén's poetry – history. The protagonist is also a product of history and he has to come to terms with the good and the bad sides of his culture's history, just as he has to accept the good and bad of the reality that faces him.

In this final edition, Guillén completes his task of showing that human life is charged with structure and meaning which we need to explore in all its fullness. A passage from Language and Poetry seems to sum up his poetics in this collection:

Reality is depicted in the poem, but not described in its external likeness. Reality, not realism. And feeling, without which there is no poetry, has no need of gesticulation. …..This restraint in the displaying of emotions retains their vehemence, and indeed doubles their intensity. But for ears that hear not, harmonies such as these are almost confused with silence. That is why some of these poets were tried and found wanting for their coldness, even though they were dedicated to declaring their enthusiasm for the world, their fervour for life, their love for love.

=== Clamor ===
It was seven years before Guillén published another collection of poems, Maremágnum in 1957. This was the start of his second portmanteau collection, Clamor. The other two constituent parts were Que van a dar en la mar (a quotation from Jorge Manrique's Coplas por la muerte de su padre) in 1960 and A la altura de las circunstancias in 1963. It is not clear when he started work on these collections. The long gap between the final edition of Cántico and the first volume of Clamor suggest that the bulk of the work was done in the 1950s especially in view of the number of poems that were added to the two later editions of Cántico.

This collection is almost the antithesis of Cántico. The continued optimism and delight in life that the poet had shown despite the upheavals in his personal life and the turmoil of world events must have begun to seem an inadequate response. So there are poems such as "Los intranquilos" which use much simpler, less distanced language and convey a sense of unease, dissatisfaction, uncertainty. In this poem, the only escape from all this is into the oblivion offered by drink or the television. In Cántico, there were many poems about awakening and how wonderful it is to return into consciousness. In Clamor, dawn brings a desire to sink back into sleep and find oblivion. "Del trascurso" compares with "Muerte a lo lejos" from Cántico and not just because both poems are sonnets. In the earlier poem, death was somewhere in the future and life was to be enjoyed. In the later poem, the poet looks back to his past where the good memories are. He then clings to the present but cannot avoid the sense of a future that is shrinking every day.

In "Viviendo", the poet is in the city, walking in the twilight surrounded by the hum of traffic. The poet feels part of a machine that is slowly ticking away time. He reaches the realization that the individual can die without the machine either slowing or stopping, regardless of whether the individual has completed his part of the work of that machine. As time goes by, the sight of tables on a café terrace remind him that there is after all a human component to this machine. The conclusion that emerges is again resignation to the inevitability of death but there is no sense of consolation, merely an unconvincing stoicism of a man journeying from nothingness to nothingness. It is a very different feel to "A vista de hombre".

In "Modo paterno", lacking any definite faith in God or an afterlife, the poet tells himself that something of his will be saved and projected into the future by his children. This belief acts as a counterbalance to the sadness and pessimism of most of the collection.

=== Homenaje ===
It seems that this collection, although published in 1967, gathers together poems written between 1949 and 1966, so it overlaps with the final stages of the writing of Cántico as well as with Clamor. It contains much occasional poetry, recording Guillén's readings, his friends, places visited, favourite painters etc. It also contains translations of French, Italian, German, English and Portuguese poetry. However, there are also more personal reflections. "Al márgen de un Cántico", for example, shows his response to critics who had accused him of writing in abstractions – such as Juan Ramón Jiménez among others. "Historia inconclusa" recalls some of the writers who have meant most to him, including a subtle tribute to García Lorca. And there are also poems which show a new-found resignation or acceptance of life, free from the ambiguities and uncertainties of "Viviendo".

Guillén gave the title Aire nuestro to the compilation of his three great poetry books prior to 1968. He would later publish Y otros poemas (1973) and Final (1982).

== Guillén and Salinas ==
These two poets have often been compared to each other. To some extent this is because they were good friends and slightly older than most of the other leading members of their generation, as well as sharing similar career-paths, but they also seemed to share a similar approach to poetry. Their poems often have a rarefied quality and tend not to deal with "particulars", readily identifiable people and places. However, they did differ in many respects as exemplified by the titles they gave to their published lectures on Spanish poetry. At Johns Hopkins, Salinas published a collection called Reality and the Poet in Spanish Poetry, whereas Guillén's Norton lectures were called Language and Poetry. Both devoted single lectures to Góngora and San Juan de la Cruz and the comparisons between them are instructive. Salinas seems to want to show us the poetic reality behind or beyond appearances, to educate us into how to see whereas Guillén gives us an account of the thoughts and sense-impressions going through his own mind: the reader is a viewer of this process not a participant in it. Vicente Aleixandre recalled visiting Salinas and finding him at his desk with his daughter on one knee and his son on the other and stretching out a hand clutching a pen to shake hands with his visitor. Although he was also devoted to his family, Guillén probably worked in a secluded study.

== Poetic work ==
- Cántico (75 poems), M., Revista de Occidente, 1928
- Cántico (125 poems), M., Cruz y Raya, 1936
- Cántico (270 poems), México, Litoral, 1945
- Cántico (334 poems), Bs. As., Sudamericana, 1950
- Huerto de Melibea, M., Ínsula, 1954
- Del amanecer y el despertar, Valladolid, 1956
- Clamor. Maremagnun, Bs. As., Sudamericana, 1957
- Lugar de Lázaro, Málaga, Col. A quien conmigo va, 1957
- Clamor... Que van a dar en la mar, Bs. As., Sudamericana, 1960
- Historia Natural, Palma de Mallorca, Papeles de Sons Armadans, 1960
- Las tentaciones de Antonio, Florencia/Santander, Graf. Hermanos Bedia, 1962
- Según las horas, Puerto Rico, Editorial Universitaria, 1962
- Clamor. A la altura de las circunstancias, Bs. As., Sudamericana, 1963
- Homenaje. Reunión de vidas, Milán, All'Insegna del Pesce d'oro, 1967
- Aire nuestro: Cántico, Clamor, Homenaje, Milán, All'Insegna del Pesce d'oro, 1968
- Guirnalda civil, Cambridge, Halty Eferguson, 1970
- Al margen, M., Visor, 1972
- Y otros poemas, Bs. As., Muchnik, 1973
- Convivencia, M., Turner, 1975
- Final, B., Barral, 1981
- La expresión, Ferrol, Sociedad de Cultura Valle-Inclán, 1981
- Horses in the Air and Other Poems, 1999

== Critic ==
- Lenguaje y poesía (1962)
- El argumento de la obra (1969)
- En torno a Gabriel Miró: breve epistolario (1973)
- «Prólogo» a Obras de Federico García Lorca (1898–1936).

== Translation ==
- Le Cimetière marin by Paul Valéry (1930).
- A los mártires españoles by Paul Claudel (1937).

== Popular culture ==
- Giannina Braschi's Spanglish novel Yo-Yo Boing! (1998) features a debate about the creators versus the masters of Spanish and Latin American poetry. The debate discusses Jorge Guillén along with Vicente Aleixandre, Vicente Huidobro, Luis Cernuda, Alberti, Pedro Salinas, as the great masters.
- Eduardo Chillida created the monument entitled Homage to Jorge Guillén, which stands outside National Sculpture Museum in Valladolid, Spain.
- Luis Santiago Pardo created a monument called Jorge Guillén and Childhood in Poniente Gardens in 1998.
- The Spanish government has issued postage stamps featuring his portraits in 1993.

== See also ==
- Miguel de Cervantes Prize
- Pedro Salinas
- Juan Ramón Jiménez
- Spanish poetry

== Bibliography ==
- Danièle Küss, Jorge Guillen, L'Harmattan, Paris, 1994.
