= Peshtpa =

Peshtpa is a musical composition by the Iranian composer Mehdi Hosseini completed in 2009. It is based on Kurdish Music. The work is scored for an oboe, bass clarinet, and violoncello. The Trio presented at the International Conference A REVERSE PERSPECTIVE which was included on a program that is dedicated to the anniversaries of the births of Pushkin (210 years), Gogol (200 years), and Futurism (100 years) and displayed music of the St. Petersburg school of composition.

The Peshtpa is a dance tune from Kurdistan. Cyclic dances and chain dances are the two most important categories to which Kurdish dances are classified. In both of them maghams are played in sequence in a defined order, usually from slow movements to rapid ones. The major center of these dances is Sanandaj and its peripheries. Pehstpa as a cyclic dance begins after Garyan and has slightly faster movements. In this type of dance the feet hit to the back of leg, hence the term Peshtpa which means “behind the leg”.
