= Ollin Yoliztli Prize =

- Awarded for: Lifetime achievement of Spanish language authors and poets
- Sponsored by: Government of Mexico
- Location: Festival Internacional Cervantino, Guanajuato, Mexico
- Presented by: President of Mexico
- Reward: 6 million pesos
- First award: 1980
- Final award: 1983
- Currently held by: Octavio Paz; Jorge Luis Borges; Jorge Guillen

The Ollin Yoliztli Prize (Spanish: Premio Ollin Yoliztli) was a prestigious but short-lived international prize that was bestowed by the President of Mexico for three consecutive years — 1980, 1981, and 1982 — to living Spanish-language poets, novelists, essayists, and playwrights.

== History ==
=== Eligibility and criteria ===
The Ollin Yoliztli Prize was open to all Spanish language writers of literature. The recognition was for collective works rather than any single work and was structured to be presented in any of the four literary genres: poetry, novels, essays, and drama.

Ollín yoliztli, means "life movement" or "life force" in Nahuatl. The prize each year was presented by the President of Mexico, José López Portillo. His sister, Margarita López Portillo (1914–2006), was a prolific novelist and his wife, Carmen Romano, was an exponent of fine arts and humanities.

=== Founding sponsor ===
The president's wife established the prize to promote Spanish literature and its important authors — and to strengthen cultural links among Spanish-speaking countries. She was instrumental in launching several large-scale cultural programs, which led to the founding of The National Fund for Social Activities (Spanish: Fondo Nacional para Actividades Sociales), commonly known by its acronym, FONAPAS. She prevailed in initiatives to make fine arts more accessible, particularly for low-income and young people. Her initiatives included erecting new fine arts venues and establishing professional orchestras. One such venue in Mexico City, which opened in 1979, bears the name Centro Cultural Ollin Yoliztli and is home to several cultural organizations, including the Mexico City Philharmonic Orchestra, founded in 1978.

While many cultural initiatives of López Portillo and his wife endure today, the economic, diplomatic, and cultural wisdom of their efforts was not without criticism. In particular, critics viewed their cultural initiatives as wasteful and part of a larger scheme of building personal projects with public money. Control of a wide range of projects was assigned to family members and close associates. López Portillo's presidency ended in November 1982. But criticism was amplified toward the end of his term, starting in February 1982, after a sharp devaluation of the peso and ensuing economic crisis. The continuity of the Ollin Yolilztli Prize ended when López Portillo's presidential term ended.

=== Juries and award ceremonies ===
The juries for the Ollin Yoliztli Prize were formed under the auspices of the Festival Internacional Cervantino in Guanajuato. (Note: The festival dates back seventy-three years, to 1953, but was formalized in 1972. The festival is one of the most important artistic and cultural events in Mexico and Latin America. Its host city, Guanajuato, is 400 kilometres (249 mi) west of Mexico City.) When the prize's creation was announced on November 10, 1979, by Héctor Vasconcelos, Director of the Cervantes Festival, the jury had been selected. Their appointments were for life. The jury was composed of six major critics and writers.

1. José Luis Martínez Rodríguez, from Mexico, was a journalist from Mexico City and director of the Fondo de Cultura Económica publishing house
2. Ramón Xirau, from Mexico, was a poet and a member of National College of Mexico
3. Juan Marichal, from Spain, was a professor of Spanish literature at Harvard
4. Dámaso Alonso, from Spain, was president of the Royal Spanish Academy in Madrid
5. Emir Rodríguez Monegal, from Uruguay, was a professor of Spanish literature at Yale
6. Enrique Anderson Imbert, from Argentina, was Professor Emeritus of Spanish literature at Harvard
- The inaugural winner in 1980 was Mexican poet Octavio Paz.
- In 1981, the jury, according to Vasconcelos, reached its decision unanimously in favor of Jorge Luis Borges during the first meeting of the jurists on May 11, 1981.
- The 1982 award ceremony took place in early June. López Portillo presented the award at his official residence, Los Pinos. Attendees included Emilio Casinello, Ambassador of Spain in Mexico from 1982 to 1985. The award to Jorge Guillén and the presence of the ambassador had diplomatic overtones because five years earlier, in 1977, Mexico had reestablished diplomatic relations with Spain following the end of Francoist Spain in 1975. The lower prize amount was mostly the result of a sharp devaluation of the peso in February 1982 and subsequent economic crisis.

== Prize winners ==
- 1980: Octavio Paz, from Mexico, then 66 years old, won the inaugural Ollin Yoliztli Prize, worth approximately US$73,000
- 1981: Jorge Luis Borges, from Argentina, a poet and short-story author, then 81 years old and blind. The award, presented by López Portillo, was worth 6 million pesos (US$70,000)
- 1982: Jorge Guillén, from Spain, then 89 years old; the award carried a purse of some US$37,500.

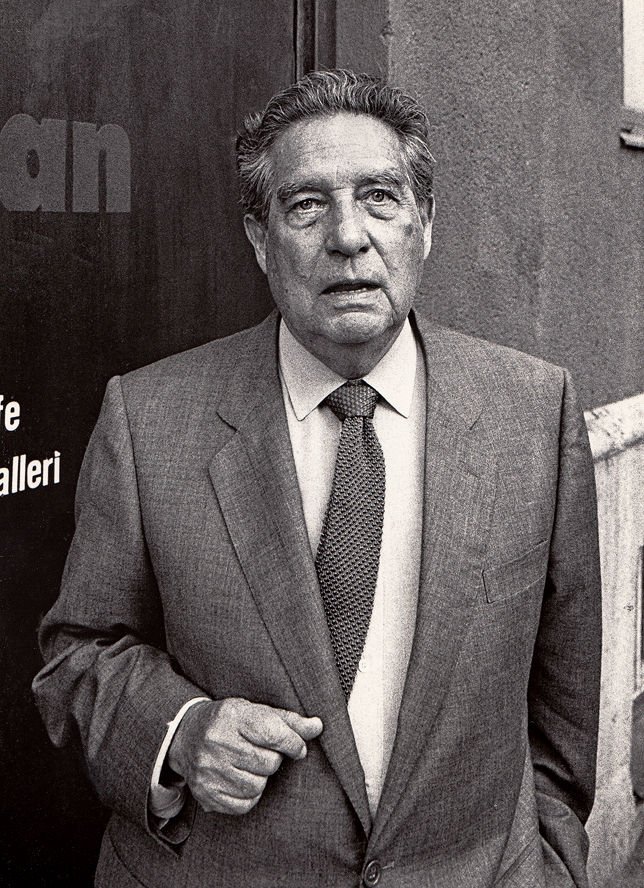
Paz at the International Poetry Festival in Malmö, 1988

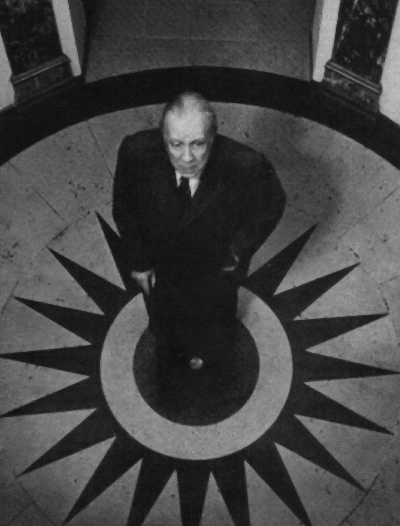
Borges at L'Hôtel, Paris, 1969

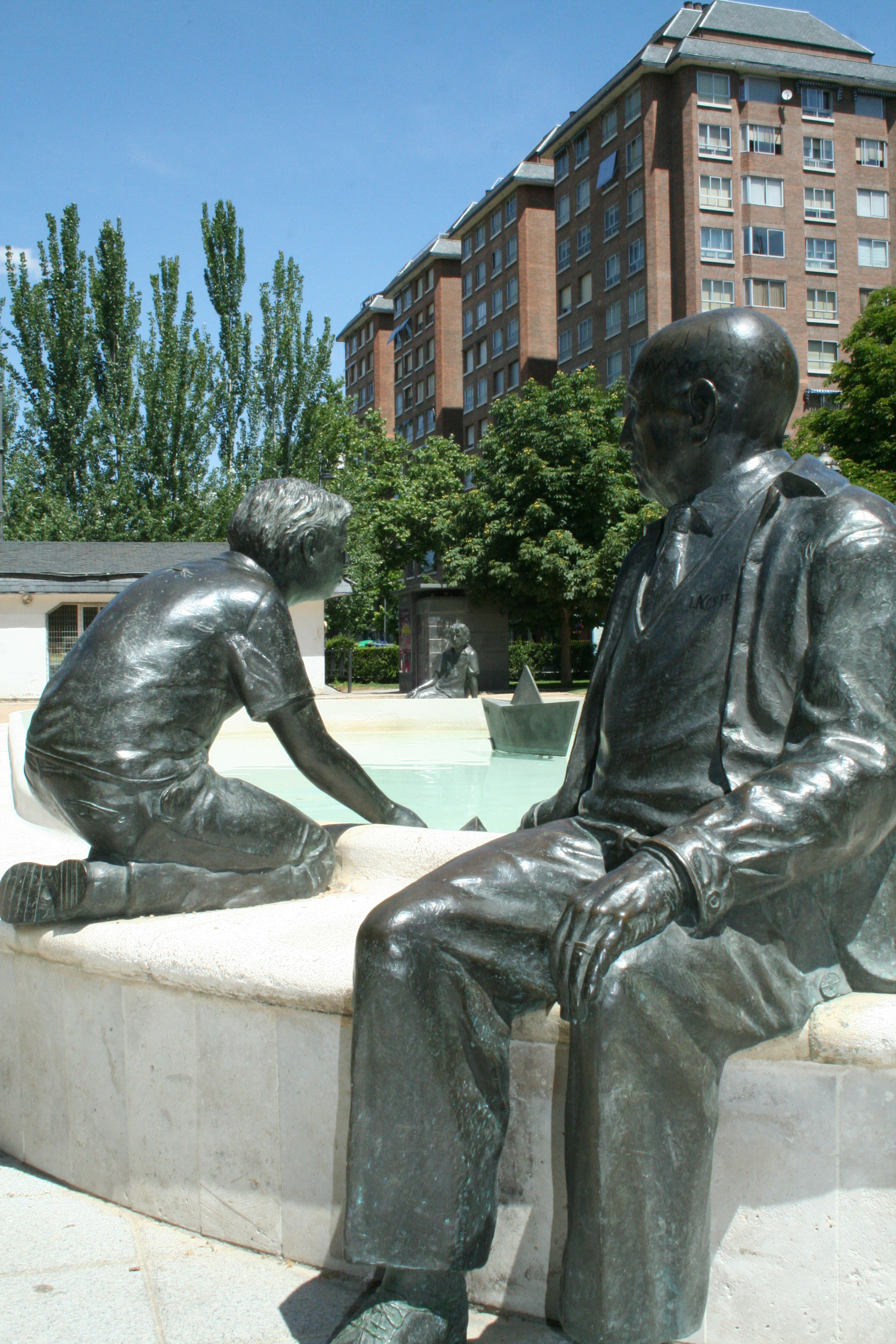
Sculpture of Guillén in the Gardens West of Valladolid
