= Symphony of Monody =

The Symphony of Monody is a 2005 composition by the Persian composer Mehdi Hosseini, performed and recorded in Saint Petersburg on 3 June 2007 by the Saint Petersburg Academic Symphony Orchestra conducted by Daniel Black. The work is based on folk music material of Lorestan.
