= Monodies (Mehdi Hosseini) =

Composition by Mehdi Hosseini

The Monodies by Iranian composer Mehdi Hosseini was completed in 2011. The work is scored for flute, clarinet, piano, violin and violoncello. The world premiere of Hosseini's composition "Monodies" was on 21 November 2011 as part of the opening day of the 23rd Annual International New Music Festival "Sound Ways", in the Glinka Hall of the St. Petersburg Philharmonic Orchestra. The work was performed by the Sound Ways New Music Ensemble under the direction of conductor Brad Cawyer. Hosseini's "Monodies" is dedicated to Italian 20th-century composer Luciano Berio. The name "Monodies" has been used quite often in the composer's works, he is devoting a significant amount of attention to the embodiment of his musical ideas into a single-voiced style, using the sounds of the traditional music of Persia and mixing them with western trends.

Hosseini often uses the word monodies not only as of the title of his composition but also as a musical term; by which he means the characteristics of single voice structures, adapting themselves to any musical texture.
