= Le Cimetière marin =

1920 poem written by Paul Valéry

Le Cimitière Marin
- by Paul Valéry
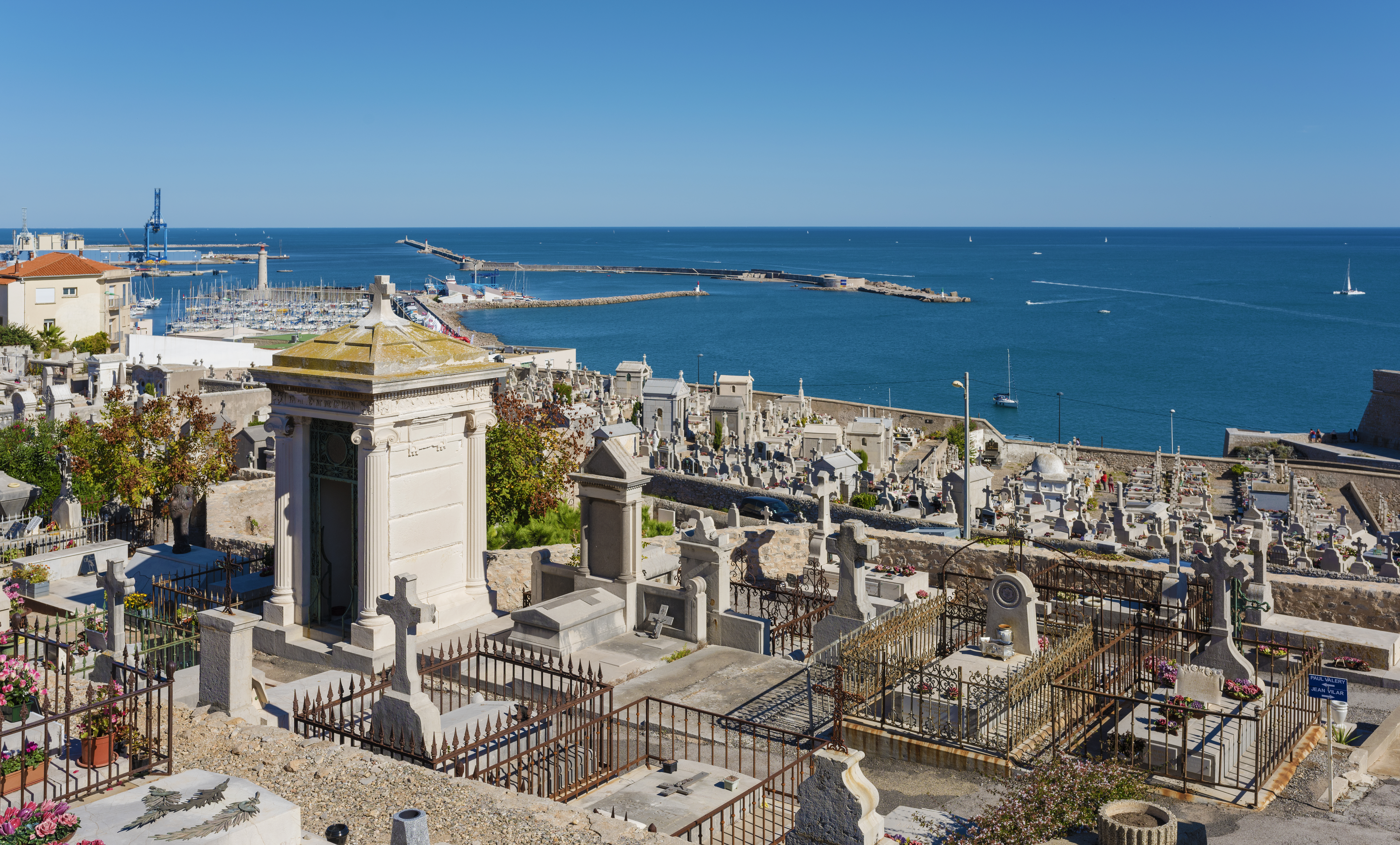
- The Cemetery at Sète
- Language: French
- Publication date: 1920

Le Cimetière marin (English: The Graveyard by the Sea) is a poem by the French poet Paul Valéry, published in 1920.

== Summary and Analysis ==
This poem, Valéry's most famous, was published in 1920 by Émile-Paul Frères, and afterwards appeared in the collection Charmes (1922). Valéry started writing it as he was working on La Jeune Parque (1917). Shared points can be found between the two works: preoccupation with the ties between mind and body, the presence of the sea.

The poem presents, in 24 sestets, a metaphysical meditation, presented in a dramatic form of four acts. The initial four strophes present the sea as an object similar to a nothingness (Hegel's "thing"), immutable and unconscious. Stanzas 5 through 9 oppose to this object the mobility of consciousness, which exists in time and which is fascinated by the desire to be pure thought. The confrontation of these two characters then gives rise, in stanzas 9 through 19, which involve the intervention of the body, to a meditation on death: the refusal of the illusion of the soul's immortality accompanies the temptation to die and to put an end to the opposition between consciousness and existence. This temptation has been overcome in the final five stanzas: renouncing the paradoxes of pure thought, the subject chooses life, the movement of the body, poetic creation, action: "The wind rises!... We must try to live!" The poem is thus a reflection on time, on the contradiction between consciousness and object, consciousness and the body. The final choice transcends this contradiction but does not resolve it. However, it should not be forgotten that the work was born, according to the author, from the obsession with a certain rhythm, the decasyllable, and not of a thought.

Paul Valéry has even underscored, perhaps with willful paradox, that this was the only one of his poems based on a memory of something seen: the cemetery at Sète. (Upon Valéry's death, the cimitière Saint-Charles was rechristened the Cimetière marin and Valéry himself was buried there).

This abstract meditation has a sensible, sometimes sensual character. As the poem says, it is not pure thought but rather a "fruit" that "melts in joy."

As the poem's epigraph, Valéry appends two verses taken from Pindar's third Pythian:

Μή, φίλα ψυχά, βίον ἀθάνατον
σπεῦδε, τὰν δ᾽ ἔμπρακτον ἄντλει μαχανάν.

Valéry cites these two verses without translating them. A possible translation would be: "O my soul, do not aspire to eternal life, but exhaust what is possible." However, Alain Frontier faults this translating with not taking full account of the word μαχανάν (the "machine," the "tool," the means which can be used to act). He therefore proposes a slightly different interpretation.

Renowned for its hermeticism, Le Cimetière marin has been the object of numerous exegeses, the best known being those by Alain and by Gustave Cohen, and later that of Michel Guérin.

== Legacy ==
Le Cimetière marin inspired the piece by the same name composed in 2008 by Đuro Živković.

== In popular culture ==
- The poem is evoked by Georges Brassens in his song Supplique pour être enterré à la plage de Sète (1966). Brassens also pays tribute to it through a line of his song Mourir pour des idées: "Et c'est la mort, la mort, toujours recommencée."
- The novel The Wind Has Risen (1936), by Tatsuo Hori, and the animated film by Hayao Miyazaki adapted from the novel, The Wind Rises (2013), both take their title from a line from Valéry's poem.
- A line in Les Bâtisseurs d'empire (1959) by Boris Vian: "le vent se lève il faut tenter de vivre."

== Studies of the text ==
- Paul Valéry, Deux études conducted by the poet and professor Daniel Lefèvre
