= Flute Concerto (Carter) =

2008 Concerto by Elliott Carter

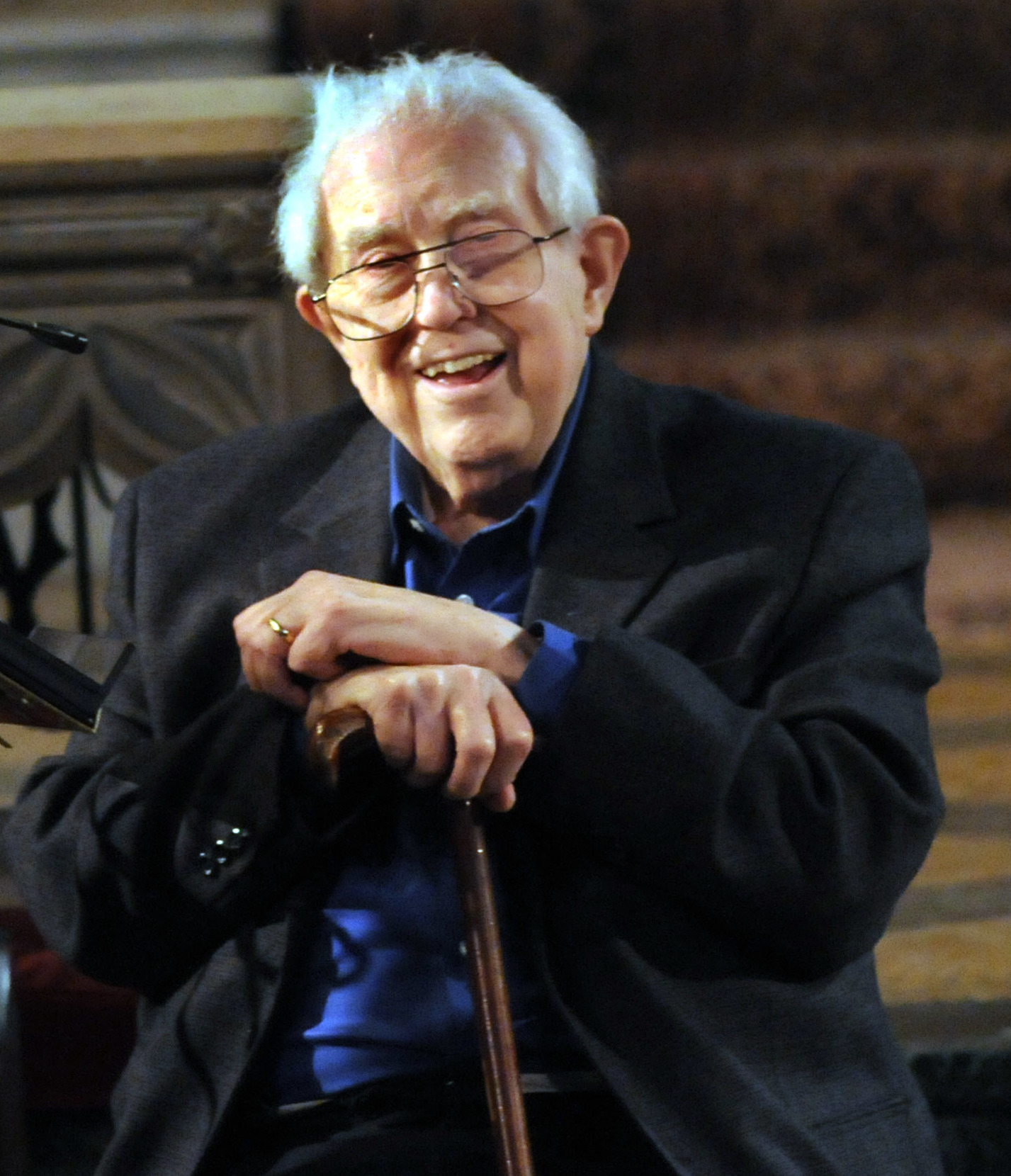
Elliott Carter in 2007

The Flute Concerto is a composition for solo flute and orchestra by the American composer Elliott Carter. The work was commissioned by Elena Bashkirova for the Jerusalem International Chamber Music Festival. Carter began the composition in September 2007 and completed it in March 2008 at the age of 99. The piece was first performed at the Jerusalem International YMCA on September 9, 2008 by the flutist Emmanuel Pahud and the Jerusalem International Chamber Music Ensemble under the conductor Daniel Barenboim.

== Composition ==
The Flute Concerto has a duration of roughly 13 minutes. Carter described the origins of the piece in the score program note, writing:

For many years flutists have been asking for a flute concerto, yet I kept putting it off because I felt that the flute could not produce the sharp attacks that I use so frequently. But the idea of the beautiful qualities of the different registers of the instrument and the extraordinary agility attracted me more and more, so when Elena Bashkirova asked me write something for her and the Jerusalem International Chamber Music Festival, I decided it would be a flute concerto. From mid-September, 2007 to March, 2008 ideas and notes for it fascinated me without relief.

=== Instrumentation ===
The work is scored for a solo flute and reduced orchestra comprising another flute (doubling piccolo), oboe (doubling cor anglais), two clarinets (second doubling bass clarinet), bassoon (doubling contrabassoon), two horns, trumpet, trombone, percussion, harp, piano, and strings.

== Reception ==
The Flute Concerto has been praised by music critics. Reviewing the North American premiere of the piece, Jeremy Eichler of The Boston Globe wrote:

Many hallmark Carter gestures can still be heard in the pointy and mercurial orchestral writing, the taut and rapid interplay between soloist and ensemble, and the kind of sharp-edged virtuosity demanded of the soloist at certain points. But the work's heart, its central section, is dominated by a striking ruminative songfulness, with long solo melodies that meander and drift through different registers while the orchestra offers only modest commentary, or later, icy chords slowly drawn to arresting effect. The work ends with a burst of pure adrenaline. Carter has written what amounts to, within his high-modernist oeuvre, a real crowd pleaser.

Anthony Tommasini of The New York Times similarly lauded the work as "rhapsodic and brilliant" and wrote, "It opens with startling, crisp orchestral chords that prod the flute into scurrying figures, quickly taken up by other instruments. The flute's skittish riffs and winding lyrical lines sometimes ignite agitated orchestral responses; at other times they are cushioned by subdued, sustained harmonies. Even when the music breaks into a jumpy back-and-forth, the mood is industrious, not aggressive." He continued, "Mr. Carter's language has lost none of its piercing, atonal bite. Yet like most of his works from his 90s and later, this score is less densely complex and layered than those from earlier decades. The enhanced clarity is a welcome turn, making it easier to hear Mr. Carter’s scintillating sonorities, myriad instrumental colors and complex rhythmic interplay." Lisa Hirsch of the San Francisco Classical Voice wrote, "About 15 minutes long and for a smallish orchestra that nonetheless includes a colorful percussion section, a harp, and a piano, it’s a lovely and challenging showpiece for the flutist."
