= Karolina Protsenko =

Ukrainian-born violinist, pianist, guitarist and singer (born 2008)

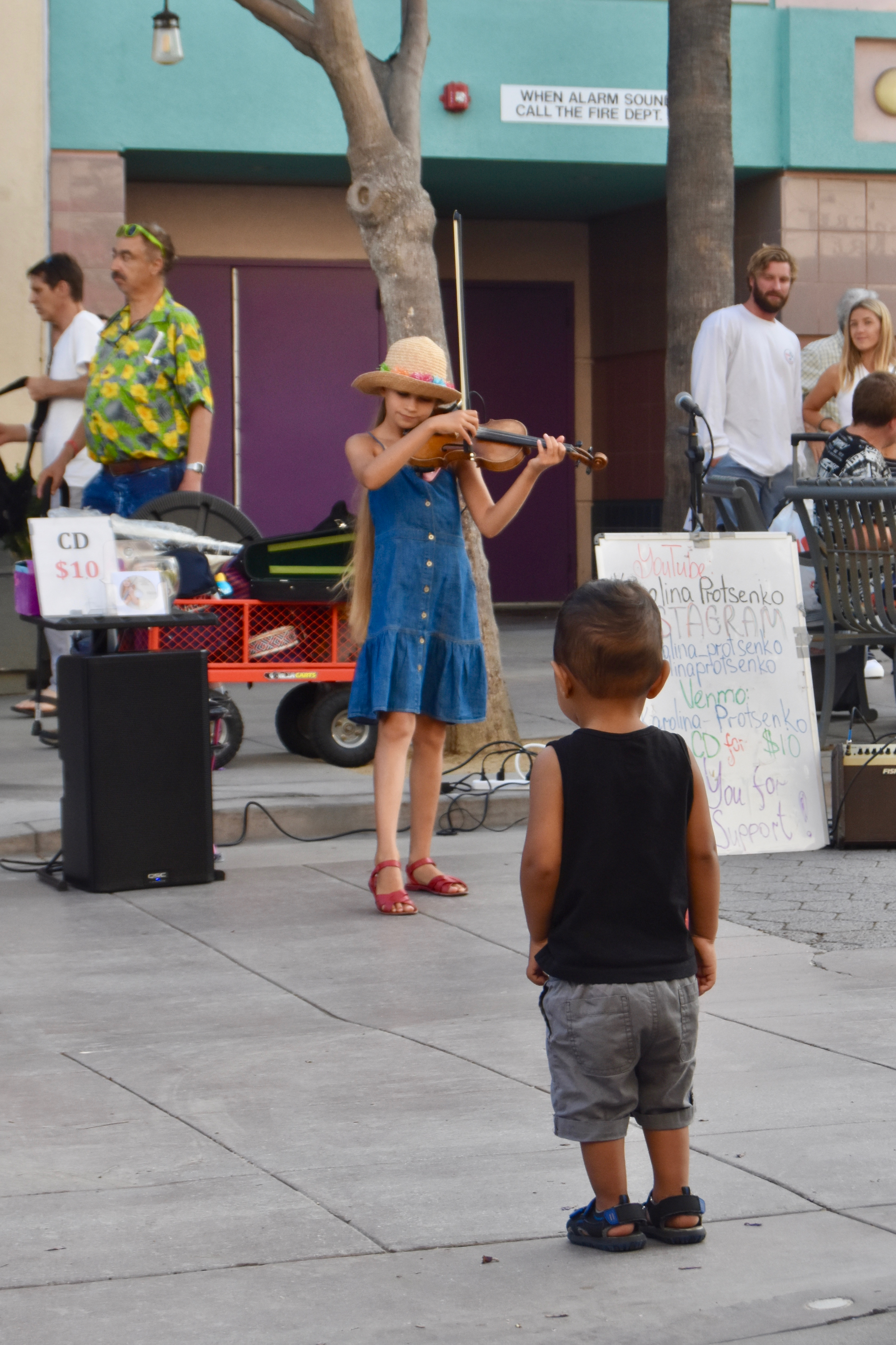
- Protsenko in 2018

Background information
- Born: October 3, 2008 (age 18); Kyiv, Ukraine
- Genre: Pop music
- Occupations: Violinist, singer, songwriter, musician, youtuber, vlogger
- Instruments: Violin, guitar, piano, vocals
- Website: karolina-protsenko.com

Instagram information
- Page: Karolina Rose
- Followers: 2.2 million

YouTube information
- Channels: Karolina Protsenko Violin; Karolina Protsenko
- Years active: 2016‒
- Genre: Music
- Subscribers: 8.77 million
- Views: 2.35 billion
- Last updated: 2026-04-29

Karolina Mykolayivna Protsenko (Ukrainian: Кароліна Миколаївна Проценко; born October 3, 2008), known since July 2025 as Karolina Rose, is a Ukrainian violinist and pianist performing contemporary pop music in the United States. She is an internet celebrity, and records street performance of music, primarily at Third Street Promenade in Santa Monica, California.

== Biography ==
Karolina Protsenko was born in Ukraine. Her parents, Mr and Mrs Protsenko, play the guitar and piano, respectively. She has two brothers, Leo (born 2018) and Nicholas (born 2021). In 2015, when Karolina was six years old, her family moved to California.

Protsenko began playing the violin in 2014, at the age of 6, having received lessons, and mainly performs violin versions of contemporary pop songs.

In 2017, the family started doing live performances on the streets of Santa Monica, California, primarily within Third Street Promenade. In 2021 Classic FM noted a video of Protsenko and her pianist mother performing an arrangement of Ludovico Einaudi's "Experience," and reported that "Her spirited string-filled renditions of classical favourites and pop songs have earned her upwards of 800 million views."

In 2019, Protsenko appeared on The Ellen DeGeneres Show.

Protsenko has collaborated with other artists and YouTubers: Angelica Hale, Allie Sherlock, Daniele Vitale, Albert Stanaj, Dang Matt Smith, Døvydas, and Barvina, playing violin, singing, and vlogging.

On March 4, 2022, Protsenko appeared on The Kelly Clarkson Show, performing a duet of "Guardian" with Lindsey Stirling.

In November 2023, Protsenko made her orchestral debut with Orchestra Nova LA.

In January 2024, Protsenko, accompanied by pianist Hsin-I Huang, performed Mendelssohn's Violin Concerto to open a Los Angeles Chamber Orchestra masterclass held at Colburn School, followed by an interview with Jennifer Koh.

In November 2024, the Christian website Crosswalk.com reposted an article from Godtube which described a video of Protsenko playing with Swedish teenager Oscar Stembridge as "a beautiful cover" of "Stand by Me," and called her "a wunderkind on the violin."

In July 2025 Protsenko announced she would use the stage name Karolina Rose for her original music releases.

Rose is actually my middle name, and I'm so excited to finally use it for my original music.

— July 2024

== Discography ==
=== Albums ===
- My Dream (2018)
- FLY (2018)
- Sunflower (2019)
- Sky (2019)
- Finally Together (2022)

=== Singles ===
- "Advice" (2025)
- "Good Girl" (2025)
- "Shiny Webs" (2025)
- "I Wanna Be Your Girl This Christmas" (2025)
- "His Crime" (2026)
- "Upside" (2026)
- "Sixteen" (2026)
- "Make You Stay" (2026)
