= Piano Concerto (Tan Dun) =

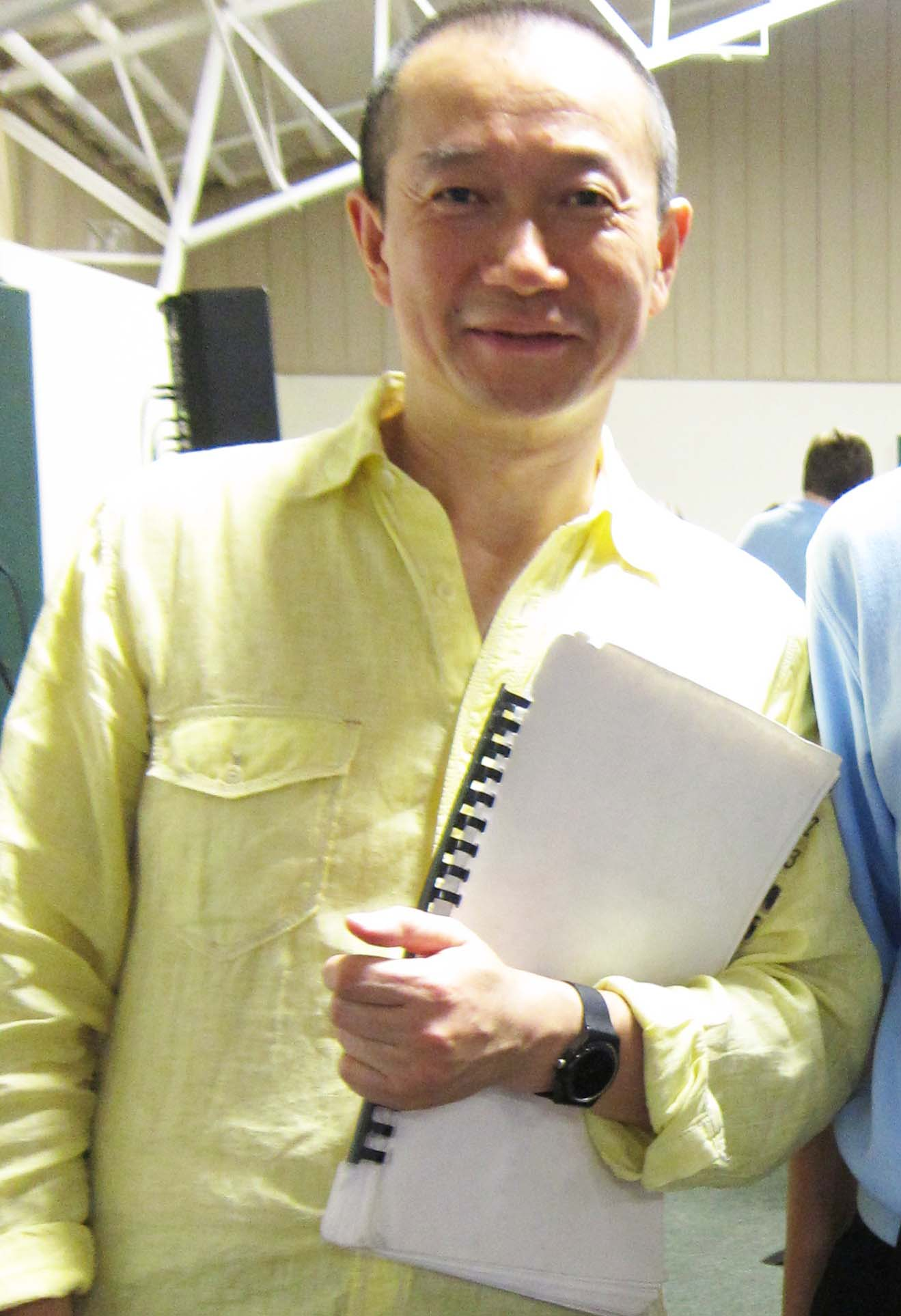
Tan Dun in 2011

Piano Concerto "The Fire" is the first piano concerto by the Chinese composer Tan Dun. It was commissioned by the New York Philharmonic under the direction of Lorin Maazel. Its premiere was given on 9 April 2008, by the Chinese pianist Lang Lang and the New York Philharmonic Orchestra conducted by Leonard Slatkin in Avery Fisher Hall, New York City.

The piano concerto has an approximate duration of 30 minutes. and is written in three movements:

1. Lento
2. Adagio melancholia
3. Allegretto

The score is published by G. Schirmer. It is scored for two flutes, piccolo, two oboes, two clarinets, two bassoons, four horns, three trumpets, three trombones, one tuba, timpani, four percussion, harp, and strings.

It was described by Lang Lang as "very melodic, very rhythmic, and very dramatic." It requires that the pianist uses their fingers, palms, fists, and forearms to play the piece, therefore the pianist was described as a "martial artist of the keyboard".

It was well received by critics and described as a "mishmash of genres".
