= Alexander Slobodyanik =

Ukrainian pianist (1941–2008)

Alexander Slobodyanik Олександр Слободяник
- Born: Oleksandr Oleksandrovych Slobodianyk; 5 September 1941; Kyiv, Ukrainian SSR, Soviet Union
- Died: 10 August 2008 (aged 66) Morristown, New Jersey, U.S.
- Genres: Classical
- Occupation: Pianist
- Instrument: Piano

Alexander Alexandrovich Slobodyanik (Note: Ukrainian: Олександр Олександрович Слободяник, romanized: Oleksandr Oleksandrovych Slobodianyk, anglicized: Alexander Alexandrovich; Russian: Александр Артемьевич Слободяник, romanized: Aleksandr Artemyevich Slobodyanik) (5 September 1941 – 10 August 2008) was a classical pianist from Ukraine. He enjoyed a prodigious international career spanning over five decades. He made his debut tour to the United States in 1968 which included a recital at Carnegie Hall, which was highly praised by critics, recognizing him as a leader of his generation. Following his American debut, Slobodyanik returned regularly for tours of the United States and Canada until 1979, when the cultural agreement between the United States and the Soviet Union was broken. After a nine-year absence from the American concert stage, his 1988 concert tour of the United States was hailed by the Chicago Tribune a “triumphant return.” Slobodyanik appeared at the world's major music centers and performed with such renowned orchestras as the Chicago Symphony, Cleveland Orchestra, Kirov Orchestra, Leipzig Gewandhaus Orchestra, Los Angeles Philharmonic, Philadelphia Orchestra, London Symphony Orchestra, Montreal Symphony Orchestra, National Symphony Orchestra, New York Philharmonic, Orchestre National de France, Pittsburgh Symphony, Royal Philharmonic, San Francisco Symphony, St. Petersburg Philharmonic and the Moscow Soloists. Slobodyanik lived the last part of his life in Morristown, New Jersey. Slobodyanik, with his energy and enthusiasm, and the help of volunteers, helped transform the Community Theater - an old, dilapidated cinema - into a first-rate performance center.

Slobodyanik died on 10 August 2008 from meningitis.
