= Concerto for String Quartet and Chamber Orchestra (Hosseini) =

2008 composition by Mehdi Hosseini

Concerto for String Quartet and Chamber Orchestra (2008) is a composition by Persian composer Mehdi Hosseini. It was premiered in Saint-Petersburg on 23 May 2010 by the Saint-Petersburg State Philharmonic Symphony Orchestra conducted by Brad Cawyer. The piece is dedicated to Nigel Osborne, and is based on Iranian regional folk music from Torbat-e Jam.
