= Symphony No. 4 (Pärt) =

2008 musical composition by Arvo Pärt

- Los Angeles
- by Arvo Pärt
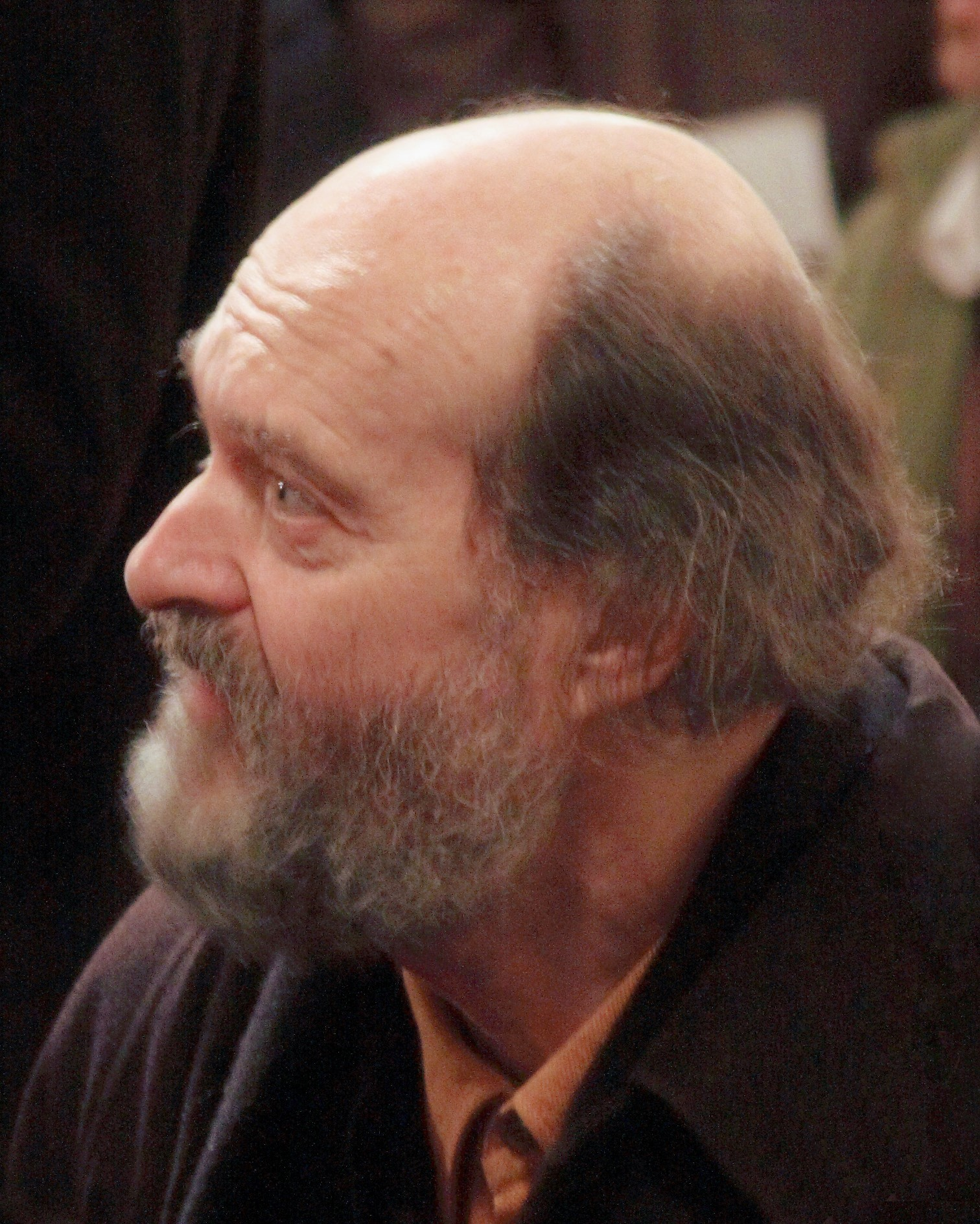
- The composer in 2008
- Composed: 2008
- Dedication: Mikhail Khodorkovsky
- Movements: three
- Scoring: string orchestra; harp; timpani; percussion

Premiere
- Date: 10 January 2009
- Location: Walt Disney Concert Hall
- Conductor: Esa-Pekka Salonen
- Performers: Los Angeles Philharmonic Association

Symphony No. 4 Los Angeles is the fourth symphony by Estonian composer Arvo Pärt. It is the first of his symphonies to be written post-1976 and is in his signature tintinnabuli style. It is the first of his pieces that focuses on larger scale, instrumental tintinnabulation. Previous pieces, such as Summa and Für Alina, were typically written for SATB choir or a smaller number of instruments. Composed in 2008, and premiered 10 January 2009, Symphony No. 4 was nominated for a 2010 Grammy Award for Best Classical Contemporary Composition, although he did not receive the award.

The work was a joint commission from the Los Angeles Philharmonic Association, its conductor Esa-Pekka Salonen, the Canberra International Music Festival, and the Sydney Conservatorium of Music.

== History ==
=== Development ===
Symphony No. 4 was written 37 years after Pärt's third symphony. In the previous decade, he had written mostly mystical works for chorus and small vocal ensembles. The piece earns its nickname, Los Angeles, from its commission. Salonen and the Los Angeles Philharmonic Association had long desired to commission a new work by Pärt, and the commission came at an opportune moment. At the time, Pärt was working on Kanon Pokajanen, a choral piece based on an ancient Russian Orthodox canon containing a prayer to a guardian angel. He decided to make "The Canon of the Guardian Angel" the foundation for this piece, as it was to be written for the flagship orchestra of a city whose name literally means "The Angels".

A note in the score indicates: "Pӓrt was further inspired to take the commission by the idea of seeing this work performed by the Los Angeles Philharmonic, one of the best orchestras in the world, under its music director Esa-Pekka Salonen, and in Walt Disney Concert Hall, one of the most exciting concert buildings of our time."

=== Premieres ===
Symphony No. 4 was premiered 10 January 2009 at the Walt Disney Concert Hall in Los Angeles, by the Los Angeles Philharmonic, under Esa-Pekka Salonen. It was the second piece of the program, placed in between the Mozart Serenade No. 12 for Winds and the Brahms Piano Concerto No. 1, performed by Emanuel Ax. The performance is reprised on disc, released by ECM Records. The album also contains fragments of Arvo Pärt's Kanon Pokajanen as a supplement to the fourth symphony.

The Los Angeles Philharmonic also played its East Coast premiere on 8 May 2010 at the Society for Ethical Culture Concert Hall in New York City. The UK premiere on 20 August 2010, at the BBC Proms at the Royal Albert Hall, was given by the Philharmonia Orchestra under Esa-Pekka Salonen.

=== Dedication ===
A distinguishing feature of Pӓrt's music is the way he has used it throughout his career in protest against different Russian governments. He composed serialist works when it was an aesthetic criticized by soviets, and composed religious music when the Soviet Union suppressed and persecuted Christianity.

The symphony is dedicated to Mikhail Khodorkovsky, a Russian oil executive and Russia's most politically active oligarch who was accused of and imprisoned for fraud. The piece is a protest against Vladimir Putin in its dedication. It is debated that Khodorkovsky's arrest is politically motivated, as he had ambitions to become prime minister and president. This angered Putin, who struck an implicit deal with the oligarchs of Russia to stay clear of politics. Convinced that Russia would be a better country with Khodorkovsky as its leader, Pärt explained in a program insert, "The tragic tone of the symphony is not a lament for Khodorkovsky, but a bow to the great power of the human spirit and human dignity." He also says, "With my composition, I would like to reach out my hand, extending it to the prisoner, and in his person to all those imprisoned without rights in Russia."

=== Reception ===
As the Grammy nomination would suggest, Symphony No. 4 met great success with the public audience. Critics and bloggers have described Pärt's work as "hauntingly beautiful", "other-worldly", and "a rare achievement". Pärt's remarkable comeback as the mystical, ecclesiastical composer seems to have made this symphony highly anticipated, after a period of musical repose and nearly four decades in between his last symphony and this new one. Some would describe this work as Pärt coming full circle in his composition, tying the loose ends created through serialism in his last symphony.

Negative reviews are few, but not nonexistent. In some reviews, Pärt is critiqued for not deviating enough from his usual quiet style, resulting in predictability. Critics also believe that in adhering to this style, Symphony No. 4 is quite subdued and unable to demonstrate Pärt's full creative potential as a composer. 5:4 blog remarks, "it's a peculiar & frustrating work, burning with earnest desires but seemingly incapable (unwilling?) to act on them." Julian Day from Limelight Magazine compares the symphony to Pärt's previous symphonies, tintinnabuli works, and pre-1976 works. Underwhelmed by the piece's effectiveness, Day writes "By its nature Pärt's music is sparse; however, this piece seems in search of a core. It has all of his trademarks...Yet its greater purpose eludes me."

== Instrumentation ==
Pärt's previous symphonies are scored for full orchestra, but this one is only scored for string orchestra, harp, timpani, and percussion, with the following percussion instruments:

- Marimba
- Crotales
- Tubular bells
- Triangle
- Suspended cymbal
- Sizzle cymbal
- Tamtam
- Bass drum

== Form ==
The symphony is in three slow movements. A performance of the work typically lasts 37 minutes. In general, it is slow-moving and solemn, keeping to the mystical mood of his works from recent decades, and has been described as "a mournful, introspective lament".

The piece blends tolling bells, sustained chords, and lengthy pauses as an observance of silence and the resonance created by bell-like sounds. Strings often play in high registers, a technique Pärt often uses to evoke the sound and sonority of bells. Although the key of the piece is A minor, tonal centers are present, but often blurred. Also notable about the piece is the repetition of intervals, particularly 3rds, 6ths, and 4ths, which are used like motifs and frequently come up throughout the piece during lyrical, melodic sections.

=== First Movement: Con sublimità (With Sublimity) ===
This movement moves through three different sections, each in a different character. The first section begins with an E Major chord, the dominant of the key of the piece.

The high pitched tremolo in the strings evoke a shimmering haze, introducing the M-voice. This is later juxtaposed by harp and percussion-the T-voice, which serves to outline the changes in harmony of the strings as the M-voice, while also serving as breaks and a release of tension in the seemingly eternal lines.

At only 76 BPM per quarter note, the duration of each bar is long and the voices are slow moving. A different voice moves approximately every two and a half bars, setting an ethereal mood and a feeling of eternity. A gradual addition of voices appear above and below the ranges of the M voice. First, crotales are added to the T-voice, above the harp. The crotales then always enter 2 bars before each harp entrance in this entire section. Bass pizzicato is then added to the T voice below, so that the T voices frame the M voices.

The section consists of a series of suspensions, where the T voices provide the resolutions, and as a whole, is a gradual descent of five octaves, beginning on an E Major chord that seems almost too high for the human ear, and ending on one that's almost too low to be audible. The second section is where the piece really seems to begin, while the first section acts more as an introduction. Although it has strong a strong rhythm, the sense of a downbeat is indistinct due to the mix of 3, 4, and 5 beats per measure.

The melody of this section is played out in quarter notes, and from quarter notes, the melody becomes eighth notes, then triplets, then sixteenth notes, implying urgency, and finally giving the music direction.

The final section returns to a more meditative state, but keeps both the urgency of the second section and the etherealness of the first section. It once again uses the T-voices to punctuate phrases and harmonies, and give the music a sense of rhythm.

=== Second Movement: Affannoso (Breathless, labored) ===
The second movement is a more vigorous movement, which briefly shatters the ethereal mood. It mainly consists of two alternating ideas: sections made up of triplets that are heavily rhythmic and percussive, and sections that are slow, rich, and lyrical. There is notable homophony throughout the first half of the movement, which creates and observes silence and space. Each instance of silence is different depending on the ring of the last notes played. Movement II begins in the tonic this time, but key areas and tonality are more difficult to distinguish due to added dissonances. The music is mostly composed of standard seventh chords and the dissonances are created by adding intervals of major and minor seconds to the chords.

The climax point of the movement resolves to what sounds like a recapitulation, an altered version of the main melody in the first movement, during which Pӓrt's "motifs" are heard throughout, where the melody is outlined by ascending and descending intervals of sixths, fifths, and tri-tones. The second movement also includes quotations from Pӓrt's own work, These Words, a piece also for strings and percussion. There is very little information available to the public regarding the piece, except that it was composed between 2007 and 2008 for a commission by Léonie Sonnings Musikfond, Denmark. It was premiered on 22 May 2008 in Copenhagen, by the Danmarks RSO, under the direction of Tõnu Kaljuste.

=== Third Movement: Deciso (Decided) ===
The final movement begins in G sharp minor, with a motif of a root position minor chord that resolves to the vi_{6}, which sets up the melancholy, melodic introduction. The introduction contains a delicate texture and a melody made up of sequences. The accompanying T voice is rhythmic and delicate as well, making the music dance-like. The movement does not begin until the coda, which officially takes the designated marking the movement was named after, Deciso.

Deciso begins with a swift, but grave march, and it is where the music is in a literal canon style. With the addition of each voice, the mood quickly transitions. Some enter in A minor and some in A major, so that the piece ends with the orchestra playing simultaneously in both keys. The low registered, somber and grounded march turns twisted and desperate as it climbs higher in pitch. Each round of the cannon adds one additional bar to the melody of the canon for every voice of the M voice that enters (begins 9 bars, ends with 12 bars by the time the first violins have joined). The voices enter in order from lowest instrument to highest. This is also where tonal centers become the most strategically blurred in the music. Each instrument group always begin on a minor, then switches to A major during their second round, then back to a minor, and so on. By the time all voices have entered into the canon, the orchestra is simultaneously playing in A major and A minor. The number of bars for each round of the melody then decreases by increments of two, and settles on a four bar ending. Like a traditional canon, the instruments in the M voice also finish in the order they started, leaving the first violins to end the canon.

The piece ends with a very decided bell toll in A minor, as if to remind us of the sound that inspired the entire work.

== Influences ==
Aside from drawing inspiration from These Words, Symphony No. 4 is a musical setting of Church Slavonic poetry. The elements of the prayer—number of syllables, inflection, and punctuation—are used to shape the structure of the piece, just as they were used for his piece Kanon Pokajanen. The symphony can be seen as Pӓrt's way of taking the textual structure of Kanon Pokajanen and setting it to word-less music, rather than setting the text directly to melody and accompaniment. Of this, Pӓrt explains, "To my mind, the two works form a stylistic unity and they belong together in a way...I wanted to give the words an opportunity to choose their own sound. The result, which even caught me by surprise was a piece wholly pervaded by this special Slavonic diction found only in church texts. It was the canon that clearly showed me how strongly choice of language preordains a work's character." The symphony is filled with the characteristics of chant, in its modality, phrasing, repetitions and alternations, the responses of voices to one another, and the use of percussion as the sounds of bells and clangs, which are associated with the ritual signals of the Orthodox Church.
