= Sergej Larin =

Russian opera singer

Sergej Larin

Sergej Alekseyevich Larin (Lithuanian: Sergejus Larinas; Russian: Сергей Алексеевич Ларин; March 9, 1956 – January 13, 2008) was one of a number of operatic tenors from the former Soviet Union to achieve success in the West. His vocal talent was acknowledged by some of the world's leading conductors including Riccardo Muti, Claudio Abbado, James Levine and Zubin Mehta. Larin was also a recitalist, with several programs of songs preserved on disc.

Larin was born in Daugavpils, Latvia. After completing a degree in French philology in Gorky and undergoing voice training in Lithuania under the Lithuanian tenor Virgilijus Noreika, he made his debut at the Lithuanian Opera and Ballet Theatre in 1981, singing Alfredo in La Traviata. After nearly a decade of performances at various Soviet venues, Larin made his debut in the West. Larin's international career started after he signed a contract with the Slovak National Theatre and moved to Slovakia, following which he made a debut at the Vienna State Opera. His Covent Garden debut took place in 1991, where he sang Don José in Bizet's Carmen, while Cavaradossi in Puccini's Tosca served for his debuts at both Paris and the Metropolitan Opera. His later roles at the Met included Don Jose in "Carmen", Pinkerton in "Madama Butterfly", Dmitri in "Boris Godunov" and Don Alvaro in "La forza del destino".

The prevailingly lyric impact of his strong tenor made him the choice for important Russian roles at several theatres. His experience with Boris Godunov began with the Fool, took him next to the role of the wily Shuisky, and finally to the False Dmitri I. The Metropolitan Opera heard his first performances of the Pretender when the Kirov visited in 1992. In 1994, Larin sang Dmitri with Claudio Abbado at the Salzburg Festival (the performance was recorded). Salzburg audiences heard Larin's rendition of Don Carlos in 1998. Larin also performed as Calaf in a production of Puccini's Turandot mounted in China and recorded, video-taped, and distributed globally.

His Andrei in Neeme Järvi's recording of Tchaikovsky's Mazeppa placed him in the company of Sergei Leiferkus, Galina Gorchakova, Anatoly Kotcherga, and Larissa Diadkova, the top post-Soviet singers in the 1990s. He also performed as Sergei in Shostakovich's Lady Macbeth of the Mtsensk District.

Larin recorded several discs of Russian songs for the Chandos label, exploring Rachmaninov and Tchaikovsky in discs entirely devoted to their works and offering another recital devoted to songs of "The Mighty Handful" (Rimsky-Korsakov, Cui, Balakirev, Borodin, and Mussorgsky) as well as two discs of miscellany, including Medtner, Gretchaninov, Rubinstein, and Kalinnikov. His accompanist in the project was Eleonora Bekova.

He died in Bratislava, Slovakia from illness, aged 51.

== Sources ==
- Erik Eriksson, Allmusic,
