= Mehdi Hosseini =

Persian composer

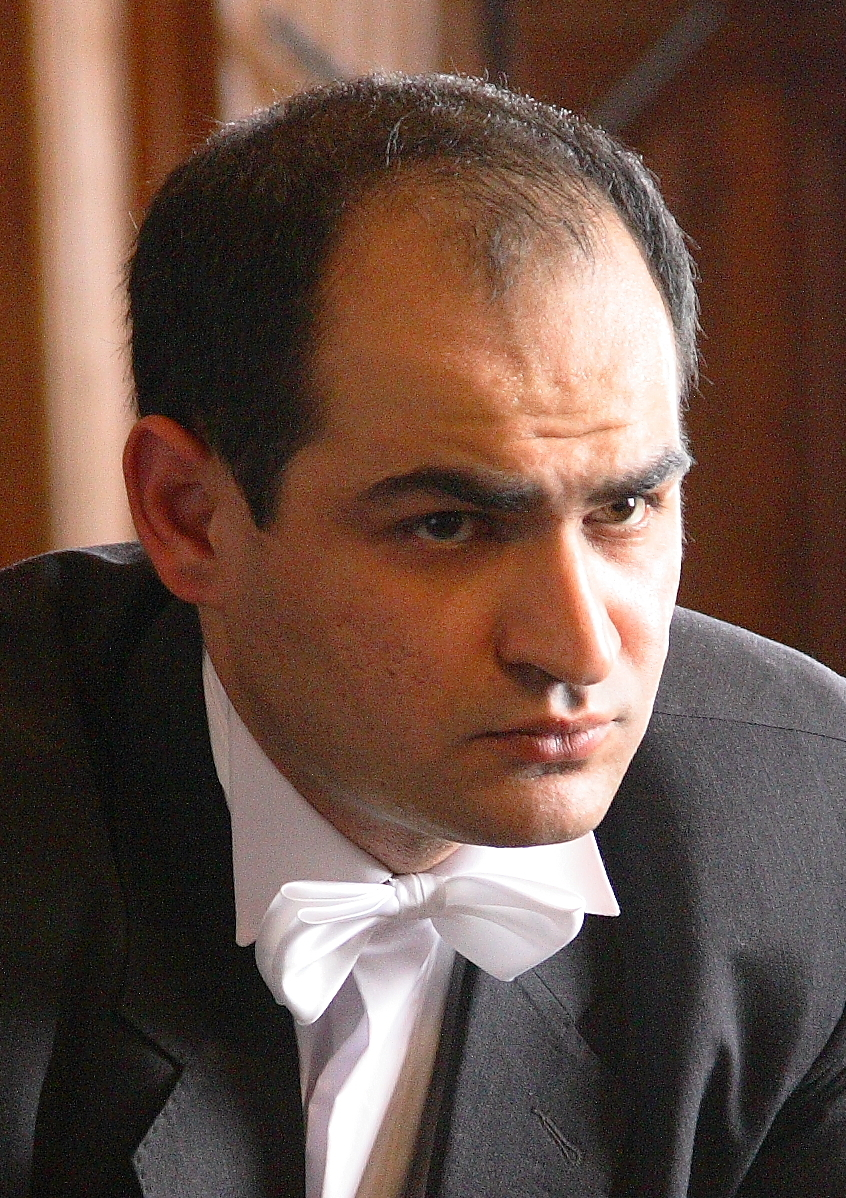

Background information
- Born: 10 July 1979 (age 47)
- Origin: Tehran, Iran
- Genres: 21st-century classical music, Contemporary classical music, Persian symphonic music, Experimental music, Electroacoustic music
- Occupation: composer
- Website: www.monodies.com

Seyedmehdi Hosseini Bami (born July 10, 1979; Persian: سید مهدی حسینی بمی) is a Persian composer of contemporary classical music.

== Biography ==
Hosseini was born in Tehran, Iran, and received his master's degree and Doctor of Music degree (DMA) in Composition from Saint Petersburg State Conservatory, named after N. A. Rimsky-Korsakov. His major teachers include Farhad Fakhreddini, Prof. Alexander Minatsakanian, Prof. Nigel Osborne and Prof. Sergei Slonimsky in composition, and Professor Tatiana Bershadskaya in Musicology. His early musical experiences included from 1998–2001, where he studying music theory, Persian music and composition with Farhad Fakhreddini in Tehran. Hosseini then entered the Saint Petersburg State Conservatory in 2001 where he under the guidance of Prof. Tatiana Bershadskaya studied musicology and composition with Prof. Mnatsakanian and continued postgraduate course with the composer Sergei Slonimsky. Mehdi Hosseini completed a composition course from the University of Music and Performing Arts, Vienna in 2007 during the summer courses at Mürzzuschlag, Austria where he studied with Nigel Osborne.

Hosseini’s compositions include works for large orchestra, chamber orchestra, and various ensembles and has been performed and recorded by orchestras and ensembles such as the St. Petersburg State Philharmonic Symphony Orchestra, the Saint Petersburg Academic Symphony Orchestra, Symphony Orchestra of the Opera and Ballet Theatre of the St. Petersburg State Conservatory, North-Ossetian State Symphony Orchestra, Ensemble intercontemporain, Namascae, Lemanic Modern Ensemble, PluralEnsemble, Ensemble Proton Bern, Studio for New Music Ensemble, Moscow Contemporary Music Ensemble, GAMEnsemble and more. His works have been published by the Compozitor Publishing House (Russia), and Donemus (Netherlands).

In the last few years, He was the focus of attention in Russia as a composer. and his works are performed during such festivals as St. Petersburg Musical Spring, Contemporary East and West, Contemporary Past, A Reverse Perspective, Trajectories of Petersburg Avant-Garde, Sound Ways, Moscow Autumn, Moscow Actual Music Festival “Another Space” and others. His music is played in Mariinsky Theatre, Saint Petersburg and Moscow Conservatories, Saint Petersburg and Moscow Philharmonics.

Mehdi Hosseini has made a substantial contribution to the cultural landscape of St. Petersburg and to the development of contemporary music in Russia. He founded the St. Petersburg Contemporary Music Center reMusik.org in 2011, which subsequently launched the St. Petersburg International New Music Festival (2013) along with its educational programs and online academy. In 2023, he established the contemporary music ensemble Répons, further supporting new music performance and artistic innovation in the region.

In 2025, Hosseini expanded his international initiatives by creating the International eLearning Institute for New Music (ILINM), launched in Switzerland. As the initiator and creator of ILINM, he serves as its CEO and Artistic Director, providing an online environment for advanced study in contemporary music and creative exchange

== Compositions ==
Hosseini's music and aesthetic style combine his work as a composer with his research background as an ethnomusicologist and music theorist. He has composed symphonic, ensemble, and chamber music works across a wide range of performance mediums, with a catalog that exhibits a monodic orientation integrated into a personal musical language.

He utilizes "Monodies" both as a title for individual compositions and as a conceptual framework that extends historical monody into a contemporary compositional and analytical system. Within this system, single-voice structures function as self-organizing principles adaptable to diverse musical textures and multidimensional sound worlds. His creative practice involves a structural inquiry into non-Western art music traditions, integrating the structural architectures of the Persian dastgāh, the Arabic maqam, and the Indian raga, alongside regional folk music traditions of Asia.

While these theoretical models inform his conceptual approach, his compositions are primarily rooted in Iranian regional folk music (musiqi-ye nawahi) and the Iranian musical system. In recent works, such as Hesar for symphony orchestra and Ctesiphon for cello, his musical textures and conceptual frameworks are structurally influenced by historical Iranian architecture.

== List of works ==
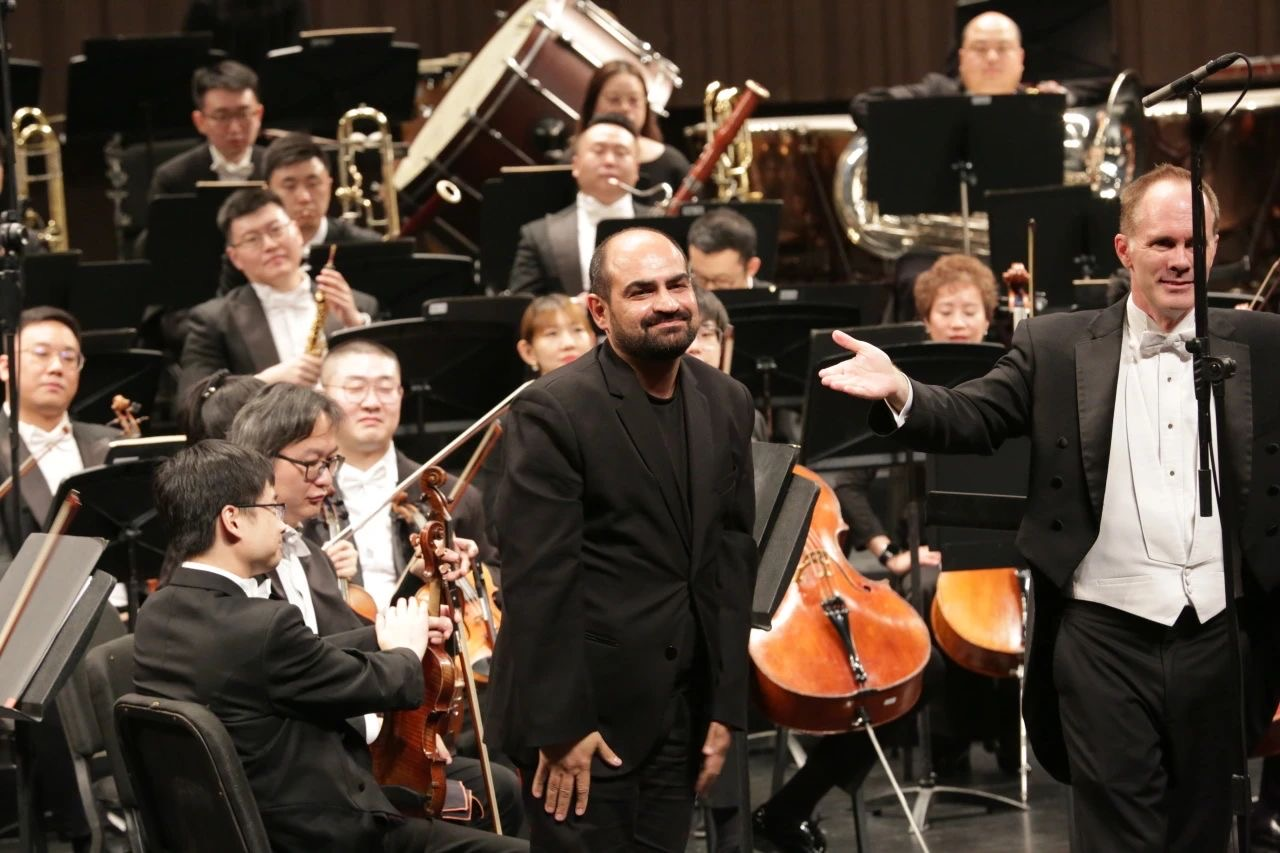
Mehdi Hosseini at the 4th Hangzhou Contemporary Music Festival

Mehdi Hosseini's Concerto for String Quartet and Chamber Orchestra

Inertia is a 2014 chamber music composition by Iranian composer Mehdi Hosseini, scored for clarinet/bass clarinet, piano, violin, and cello. Recorded by Ensemble proton bern (Switzerland)

- Symphony of Monody (2005);
- Concerto for String Quartet and Chamber Orchestra (2008)
- The Baluch (2009), for alto flute, contrabassoon, horn, xylophone, violin and cello
- Peshtpa (2009), for oboe, Bass clarinet and violoncello
- Taleshi Hava (2010), for solo violin and bassoon
- An Unfinished Draft (2010), for flute, clarinet, piano, violin, violoncello and baritone
- Pause (2010), for flute, clarinet, piano, violin, violoncello and tubular bells
- Monodies (2011), for flute, clarinet, piano, violin and violoncello
- Hesar (2013), for symphony orchestra
- Abkenari (2013), for flute, clarinet, violin and cello
- Sarbang (2014), for flute, oboe, clarinet (Bb), trombone, piano, percussions, violin, viola and cello
- Marsiehâ-ye Khâk (2014), for Symphony Orchestra
- Inertia (2014), for clarinet/bass clarinet, piano, violin and cello
- Sârukhâni (2016), for ensemble
- Ctesiphon (2024), for cello

== Awards ==
- Best Classical Album of the Year (2013), From Iranian House of Music

== See also ==
- Category:Compositions by Mehdi Hosseini
- Music of Iran
- Persian symphonic music
