= Meremõisa =

Village in Estonia

Coordinates: 59°24′N 24°16′E

- Village
- Interactive map of Meremõisa
- Country: Estonia
- County: Harju County
- Parish: Lääne-Harju Parish

Population (31 December 2021)
  - Total: 163
- Time zone: UTC+2 (EET)
  - Summer (DST): UTC+3 (EEST)

Meremõisa is a village in Lääne-Harju Parish, Harju County in northern Estonia.

Meremõisa is about 27 km (17 mi) west of the capital Tallinn, west of Keila-Joa, and next to Lohusalu Bay, which is part of the Gulf of Finland. It borders with Laulasmaa, Käesalu, Keila-Joa, and Merenuka. Keila River is the natural border of Meremõisa with Merenuka and Keila-Joa.

According to the 2011 Estonia Census, the population was 176 people, 163 (92.6%) of these being Estonians. By the end of 2021, the population had decreased to 163 people in total.

Meremõisa is known for its sandy beach, easily accessible by foot as well as by car, with a camping area managed by the State Forest Management Centre. The area has three covered and four open campfire sites, five dry toilets, places for 50 tents, and parking spots for 60 cars.

A large part of the settled area in Meremõisa, the former government resort, is a gated community.

== Meremõisa manor ruins ==
Meremõisa manor (in German Merremois) was established in the 1580s. Over the centuries, it belonged to several noble families, including the Wartmanns, Pilar von Pilchaus, Klugens, and Koskulls. In 1837, the manor was bought by the owner of the neighbouring Keila-Joa Manor, count Alexander von Benckendorff. At the time of the purchase, the new Meremõisa manor house was not yet completed. As Benckendorff had recently finished building his Keila-Joa Manor just 500 m (1,640 ft) to the east, on the other bank of Keila River, he saw no reason for erecting another manor house nearby. Instead, he conserved the unfinished walls and turned them into stylised ruins overlooking the river. Although the ruins have been further damaged over time, the remaining fragments were conserved again in 2020, and can be visited for free.

== Meremõisa cemetery and chapel ==
The private cemetery near the Meremõisa manor ruins, about 900 m (2,953 ft) west of Keila-Joa Manor, was also established by the Benckendorff family. The first person to be buried there in 1844 was count Alexander von Benckendorff, followed in 1857 by his wife Elizaveta. Altogether, 10 people have been buried at the cemetery, including several members of the Russian princely family of Volkonsky, related to Alexander von Benckendorff through his daughter Maria's marriage to prince Grigory Volkonsky. The graves were heavily damaged, the metal crosses and other decorative elements removed by soldiers stationed in a nearby garrison during the Soviet occupation of Estonia. The same fate befell the small chapel in Historicist style, erected at the cemetery sometime in the mid-19th century.

== Meremõisa resort ==
In the 1930s, Meremõisa was designated as the location for a government resort. The construction of summer houses for the government ministers began in 1934 and the first four were completed by summer 1935. The resort was a gated community, and in 1936 public access to the beach and mouth of Keila River was blocked off on security reasons. The resort was also used by the first President of Estonia Konstantin Päts and the commander‑in‑chief of the armed forces Johan Laidoner.

Under the Soviet occupation, the resort belonged to the Council of Ministers of the Estonian Soviet Socialist Republic. Many new summer houses were constructed, the most notable of which are two villas erected between 1987 and 1989 for the First Secretary of the Communist Party of Estonia Karl Vaino. By the end of the Soviet rule in 1991 there were 47 summer houses in total that were transferred to the Government Office that continued renting them out as holiday homes to government ministers and officials, as well as to members of Riigikogu. In 2002, the decision was taken to sell the resort, and in 2003 the summer houses were bought for 52.7 million Estonian kroons by Kalev Real Estate Company. The company further sold them to well-known Estonian businessmen and politicians (including Edgar Savisaar, Jaan Toots, Oliver Kruuda, and Aleksei Morozov), some of whom still own the property. In addition, 76 new estates were established and sold. The former resort operates as a gated community and maintains a private boat harbour on Keila River.
