= Keila (disambiguation) =

Keila may refer to:

Places in Estonia

- Keila, town and urban municipality in Harju County
  - Keila JK, football club based in Keila
- Keila Parish, former rural municipality in Harju County
- Keila-Joa, small borough in Lääne-Harju Parish, Harju County
- Keila (river), river in Estonia
  - Keila Falls

Other places

- Keila, Germany, municipality in Saale-Orla-Kreis, Thuringia, Germany
- Keilah, ancient city in Israel

Other

- Keila Costa (born 1983), Brazilian long jumper and triple jumper
- Keila Jedrik, fictional character from the Frank Herbert's 1977 novel The Dosadi Experiment
- Cyclone Keila of the 2011 North Indian Ocean cyclone season
- Khemara Keila FC, Cambodian football club based in Phnom Penh
