= Arvo Pärt Centre =

Music centre in Estonia

- Abbreviation: APC (Estonian: APK)
- Formation: 2010; 16 years ago
- Founders: Arvo Pärt; Nora Pärt; Michael Pärt; Immanuel Pärt
- Type: Private foundation
- Headquarters: Laulasmaa, Estonia
- Region served: International
- Method: Government funding, donations, earned revenue
- Key people: Michael Pärt (chairman of the board); Anu Kivilo (managing director)
- Employees: 18 (2026)
- Website: arvopart.ee
- Formerly called: International Arvo Pärt Centre

Arvo Pärt Centre (Estonian: Arvo Pärdi Keskus) is a foundation responsible for maintaining the personal archive of classical composer Arvo Pärt and operating as an information centre on the composer and his works. The centre is located in the coastal village of Laulasmaa in Lääne-Harju Parish, Estonia, about 35 kilometres (22 mi) to the west from Tallinn. It was established in 2010 by the Pärt family. In October 2018 the new building of the centre, designed by Spanish architects Fuensanta Nieto and Enrique Sobejano from the architecture and design firm Nieto Sobejano Arquitectos, was opened to the public.

== History ==
=== Founding and early years ===
The idea to create a separate institution for the personal archive of Arvo Pärt arose from the need to ensure the composer permanent access to his collections and at the same time to prepare these collections for long-term preservation and for public research. The centre was established by Arvo Pärt and his family in 2010 when the composer had returned to Estonia after living in Germany since 1981. It was originally named the International Arvo Pärt Centre (Estonian: Rahvusvaheline Arvo Pärdi Keskus), with 'international' dropped from the name in 2014.

The Arvo Pärt Centre was founded in the village of Laulasmaa because at his return to Estonia Arvo Pärt had chosen this coastal location as his permanent place of residence. In 2009 a residential building was bought to house the archive and to serve as a future location of the centre. The house was later named Aliina after Arvo Pärt's first piece in tintinnabuli-technique, Für Alina (1976). For the first eight years the main tasks of the centre were organising the archive, creating metadata and a digital information retrieval system. Due to the preparatory stages of work and general lack of space the centre was in most part closed to the public until late 2018.

=== New building ===
To create facilities for research and educational programmes and to develop the centre into a meeting place for music lovers with a proper concert hall, an international two-stage architectural competition was announced in 2013. Altogether 71 designs from 24 countries were submitted. A Spanish architecture and design firm Nieto Sobejano Arquitectos (led by Fuensanta Nieto and Enrique Sobejano) was declared the winner of the competition on 20 June 2014 by the President of Estonia Toomas Hendrik Ilves.

The preparations for the construction of the new building started in March 2017. The cost of the construction works, funded by the Estonian government, was 6.7 million Euros. The work was carried out by construction company Ehitustrust. The cornerstone was laid on 19 June 2017 at a festive ceremony attended among others by Arvo Pärt, Prime Minister Jüri Ratas and Minister of Culture Indrek Saar. The construction was finished in mid-2018.

The inauguration ceremony took place on 13 October 2018 in the form of three concerts by invitation. The guests were greeted by Arvo Pärt, Chairman of the Board Michael Pärt, Managing Director Anu Kivilo, and architects Fuensanta Nieto and Enrique Sobejano. The main guests speaking at the event were President of Estonia Kersti Kaljulaid, Vice-President of the European Commission Andrus Ansip and Minister of Culture Indrek Saar. Arvo Pärt's new choral work And I Heard a Voice... had its Estonian premiere. Some parts of the inauguration ceremony were broadcast live by public broadcasting channels Eesti Televisioon and Klassikaraadio. The first public concert in the centre took place the following day, 14 October 2018, with American violinist Anne Akiko Meyers accompanied on a piano by Akira Eguchi.

=== Access ===
The Arvo Pärt Centre opened its doors to the public on 17 October 2018. The aim has been that the Centre should be open to anyone interested in Arvo Pärt's music and world of ideas.

The Arvo Pärt Centre provides guided tours introducing the life and work of Arvo Pärt. There are also educational programmes available both for children and adults. The centre also organises lectures and seminars on various topics related to Arvo Pärt's music and worldview. Various research activities and conferences are organised in collaboration with other institutions of research and higher education.

In 2020 the centre closed to the public in response to the COVID-19 pandemic. In April 2020, after receiving an award from the BBVA Foundation, Pärt gave an interview to the Spanish newspaper ABC concerning the coronavirus crisis. He was quoted as saying that nobody knows how we will emerge from this, but we feel that nothing will be the same ("Nadie sabe cómo saldremos de esto, pero todos sentimos que nada permanecerá como estaba"). The centre reopened in May 2020.

== Functions ==
=== Archive, library, information centre ===
At the core of the Arvo Pärt Centre are the personal archive and the personal library of the composer. The majority of the archival materials are original documents from the composer's family – handwritten documents related to his creative work date back to 1970s. Many earlier documents from 1950s to 1970s are currently located at other memory institutions of Estonia or in private hands but the Arvo Pärt Centre has either paper or digital copies of most of them. The most valuable items in the archive are Arvo Pärt's handwritten scores, sketches, schemes, and music diaries. Researchers can view lists of the archive content on the centre's web site but even digital materials are accessible only on location.

The library contains more than 2,000 books from the personal collection of Arvo Pärt and his wife Nora. The composer's personal collection has two focuses – music and theology. The majority of books in the collection are on Orthodox theology and spirituality, which has been an important source of inspiration for Arvo Pärt. The library also collects and stores CDs with Arvo Pärt's music, printed scores of his works, and books about his life and music.

Based on the personal collections in the centre and on close collaboration with the composer and his family the centre also operates as an international information centre on Arvo Pärt, making available the most authoritative and up-to-date information on his life and works.

The first research conference organised in cooperation of the Arvo Pärt Centre and the Estonian Academy of Music and Theatre was planned for Arvo Pärt's 85th birthday in autumn 2020. Due to the COVID-19 pandemic it was postponed for a year. The conference took place on 15–16 October 2021 under the title Arvo Pärt – Texts and Contexts with presentations by several internationally known Pärt scholars like Peter J. Schmelz, Kevin Karnes, Jeffers Engelhardt, Toomas Siitan, etc.

=== Music and films ===
The new building of the Arvo Pärt Centre houses also a concert hall with 150 seats, ideal for chamber music concerts. The centre organises its own concerts as well as offers performing space for musicians not invited by the centre. The focus of the concert programme is on introducing musicians from Estonia and abroad who have had a close collaboration with Arvo Pärt over the years. In the first two seasons there have been concerts by violinist Anne Akiko Meyers, countertenor David James from the Hilliard Ensemble, the Estonian Philharmonic Chamber Choir, the Tallinn Chamber Orchestra, early music ensemble Hortus Musicus, vocal ensemble Vox Clamantis, and many others.

Every August since 2011 the Arvo Pärt Centre has organised film evenings with a selection of films featuring Arvo Pärt's music. The activity has been conducted in collaboration with cinema Sõprus in Tallinn, however, after the opening of the new building in 2018 some screenings have been also organised at the premises of the centre.

=== Publishing ===
Since 2014 the Arvo Pärt Centre has also published a number of books, most of them about Arvo Pärt's life and music, as well as an edition of his songs for children:

- 2014 – In Principio : The Word in Arvo Pärt's Music. ISBN 9789949380534.
- 2015 – Lapsepõlve lood. Songs from Childhood. (CD and sheet music).
- 2017 – Leopold Brauneiss. Arvo Pärdi tintinnabuli-stiil: arhetüübid ja geomeetria. ISBN 9789949816057.
- 2018 – Joonas Sildre. Kahe heli vahel: graafiline romaan Arvo Pärdist. ISBN 9789949887057. (German translation published by Voland & Quist in 2021 as Zwischen zwei Tönen: aus dem Leben des Arvo Pärt: eine graphic Novel)
- 2020 – Fr Raphael Noica. Vestlused kloostris. ISBN 9789949747016.
- 2021 – Peter Bouteneff. Arvo Pärt: vaikusest sündinud. ISBN 9789949747023 (English original Arvo Pärt: Out of Silence).

== Architecture ==
The Arvo Pärt Centre is also known for its modern building, completed in 2018. The architects themselves have described their design as "searching a balance between the intimacy of the Estonian artist’s compositions and the serene beauty of the landscape".

The design responds to the natural setting in a pine forest with a structure which is lower than the tree canopy apart from an observation tower. The helical tower provides a view of the Baltic Sea. The building makes use of various geometrical (mostly pentagonal) structures and shapes, and largely due to the sinuous curved walls forms a continuity without a clear beginning or end. The extensive use of glass walls brings together the oak-panelled interior and the exterior dominated by its forest setting. The centre has another unusual architectural element apart from the tower, a small Orthodox chapel in one of the patios.

=== Nominations and awards ===
- Construction Project of the Year 2018 (by the Estonian Association of Architectural and Consulting Engineering Companies and the Estonian Association of Civil Engineers)
- Shortlisted for the Mies van der Rohe Award 2019
- Architecture Endowment 2019 (by the Cultural Endowment of Estonia)
- Nominated to the 2019 Annual Award of the Estonian Association of Architects
- Nominated to the 2019 Annual Award of the Estonian Association of Interior Architects
