= Laulasmaa =

Village in Estonia

- Village
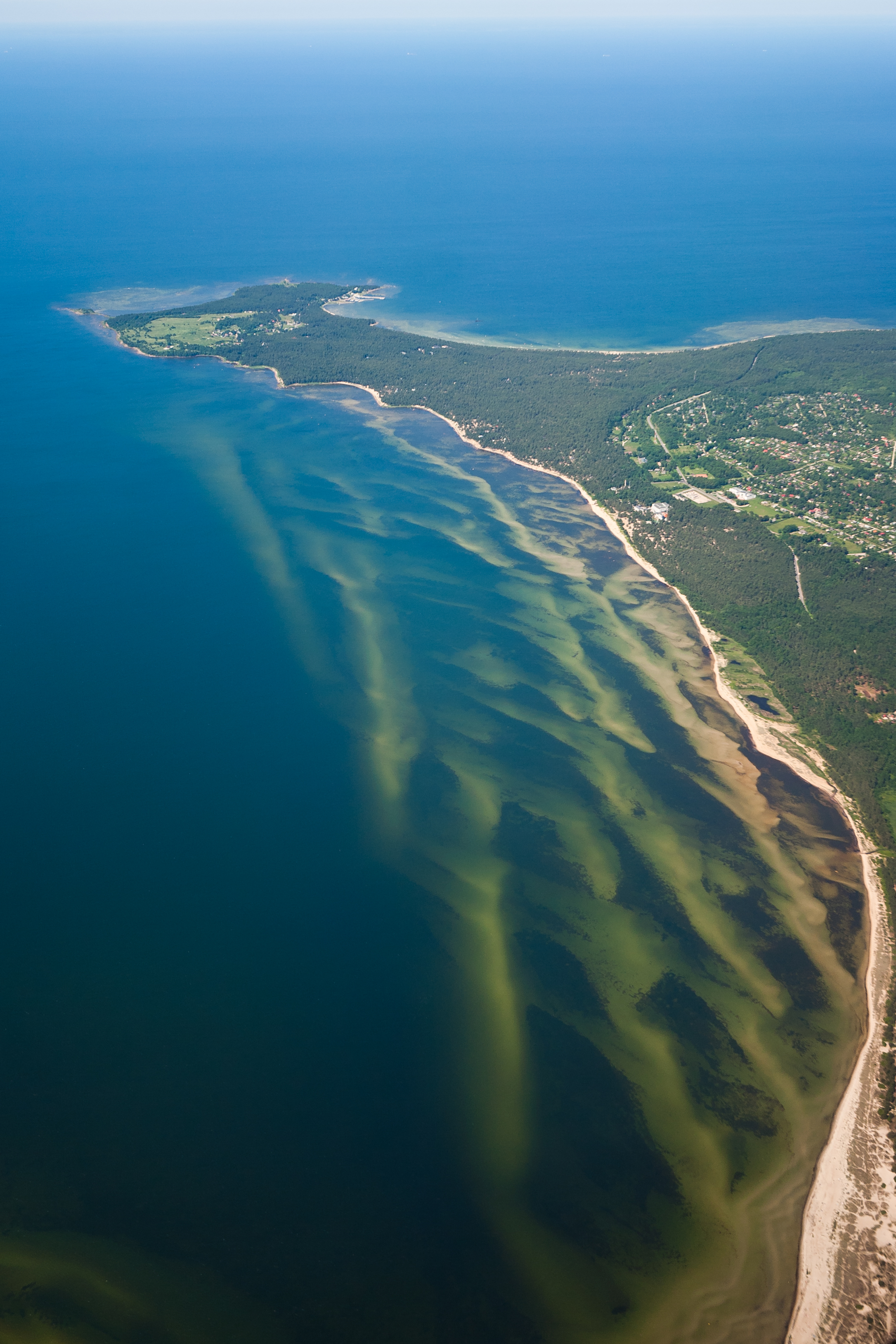

- Location in Estonia
- Coordinates: 59°22′51″N 24°14′42″E
- Country: Estonia
- County: Harju County
- Municipality: Lääne-Harju Parish

Population (31 December 2021)
  - Total: 789

Laulasmaa (German: Laulasma) is a village in Lääne-Harju Parish, Harju County, in northwestern Estonia.

== Location ==
Laulasmaa is about 29 km (18 mi) west of the capital Tallinn, west of Keila-Joa, north of Kloogaranna, and next to Lahepere Bay and Lohusalu Bay, both of which are part of the Gulf of Finland. It borders Lohusalu, Kloogaranna, Käesalu, and Meremõisa.

== Name ==
Laulasmaa was attested in historical sources as Laolaskme in 1583–1589, Laulasken in 1591, and Laulasmeh in the 17th century. During the Swedish era, there was a small village called Laurlaskammaby (attested in 1615), where an estate was established in the second half of the 18th century. Based on the name attested in 1615, Laulasmaa is a compound name. The first part is laid (realized as the genitive lao) 'small island', and the second part is the element laskama, with an unknown meaning, possibly related to laasmaa 'meadow cleared from a forest'. Folk belief explains the name as meaning 'singing sands'.

== History ==
In January 2005, the village had a population of 309. In the next 15 years, the population of the village increased more than twofold, reaching 789 by the end of 2021.

The village was first mentioned when under Swedish control (Laulasmeh). People started to spend their summers in Laulasmaa from the 1930s and the first summer cottages were built in the early 20th century.

Laulasmaa is the home of the composer Arvo Pärt, and it is the location of the Arvo Pärt Centre.

== Gallery ==
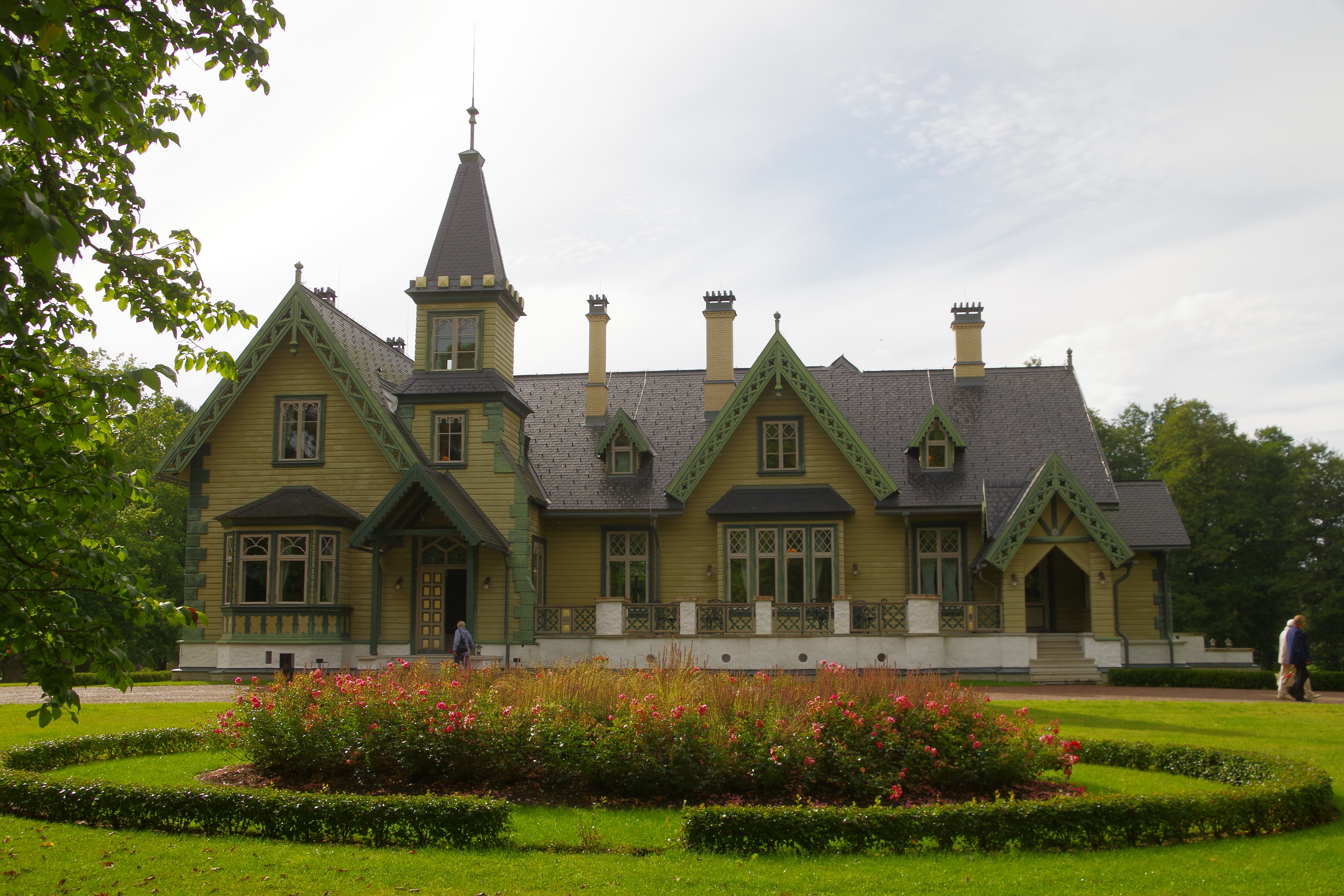
Kõltsu manor

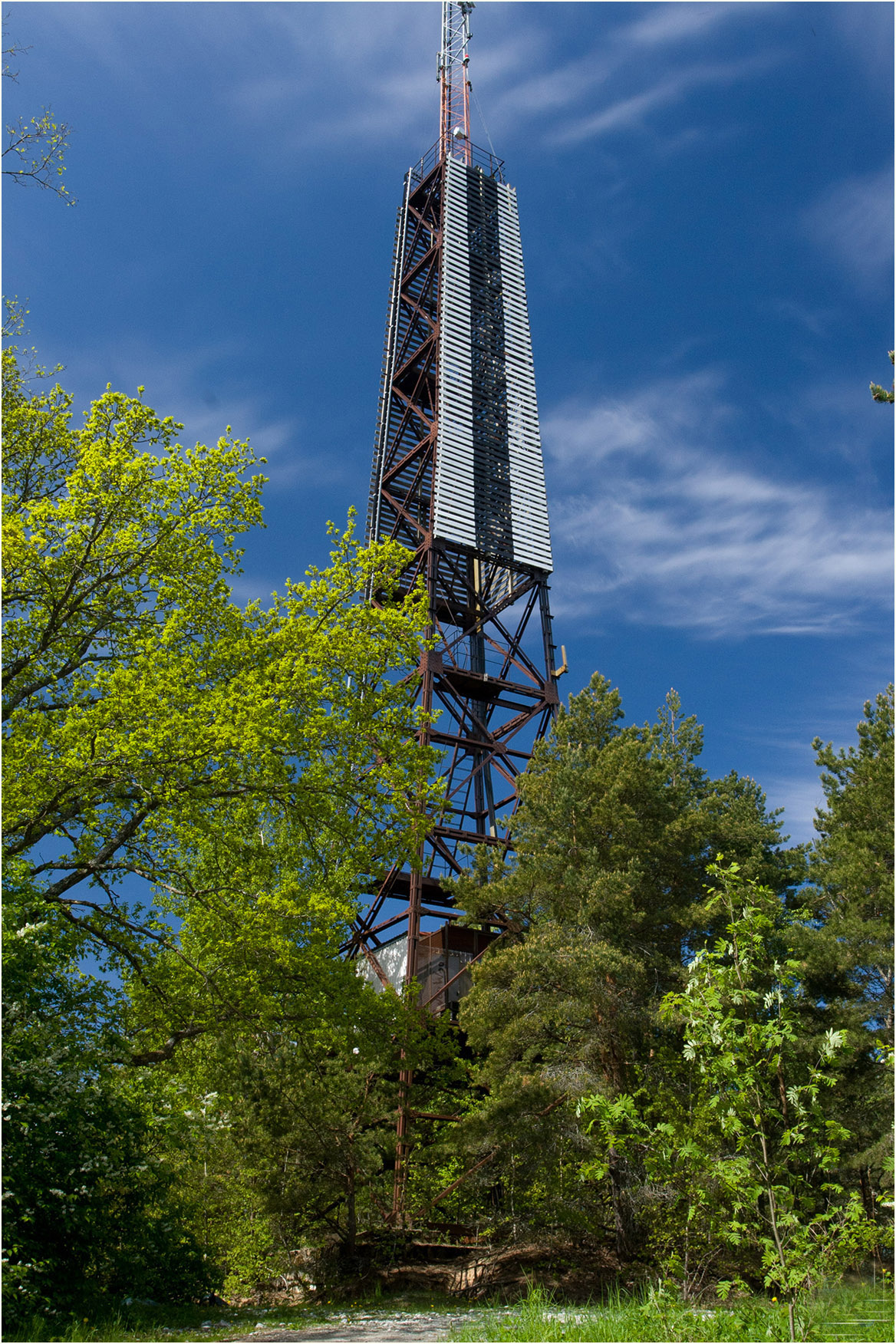
Laulasmaa daymark
