= Laulasmaa Landscape Conservation Area =

Protected area in Estonia

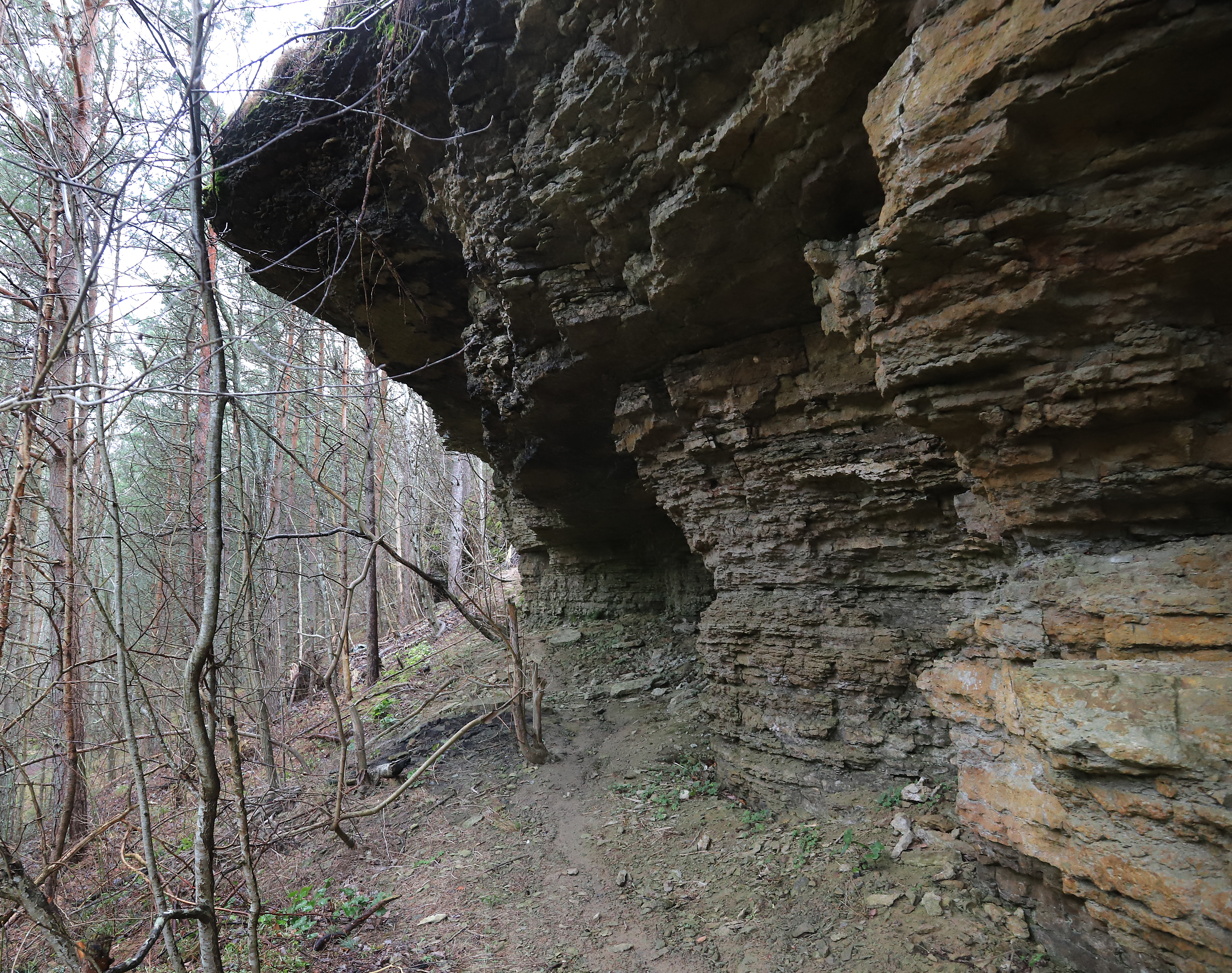

- Location within Estonia
- Location: Estonia
- Coordinates: 59°23′30″N 24°14′10″E
- Area: 131 ha (320 acres)
- Established: 2005

Laulasmaa Landscape Conservation Area is a nature park is located in Harju County, Estonia.

Its area is 131 ha.

The protected area was founded in 2005 to protect coastal landscapes of Laulasmaa with its biodiversity.
