= Salinõmme Peninsula =

Peninsula in Estonia

Coordinates: 58°50′30″N 22°56′10″E

Salinõmme peninsula is a peninsula in southeastern Hiiumaa, 5 km to south of Suuremõisa, an Estonian territory in the Baltic Sea. It lies in east of Salinõmme Bay and in west of Soonlepa Bay. Village of Salinõmme comprises all of the peninsula. In 1870 the peninsula was still an island.
