= Vandkunsten (disambiguation) =

Vandkunsten may refer to:

- Vandkunsten, a square in Copenhagen, Denmark
- Tegnestuen Vandkunsten, an architectural firm named after it
- Forlaget Vandkunsten, a publishing house also named after it
