= Suuremõisa Bay Nature Reserve =

Protected area in Estonia

- Location within Estonia
- Location: Estonia
- Coordinates: 58°33′N 23°14′E
- Area: 416 ha (1,030 acres)
- Established: 1965 (2017)

Suuremõisa Bay Nature Reserve is a nature reserve which is located in Saare County, Estonia.

The area of the nature reserve is 416 ha.

The protected area was founded in 1965 on the basis of Suuremõisa Bay Ornithological Prohibited Area (Estonian: Suuremõisa lahe ornitoloogiline keeluala). In 2017 the protected area was designated to the nature reserve.
