= Salinõmme =

Village in Estonia

- Village
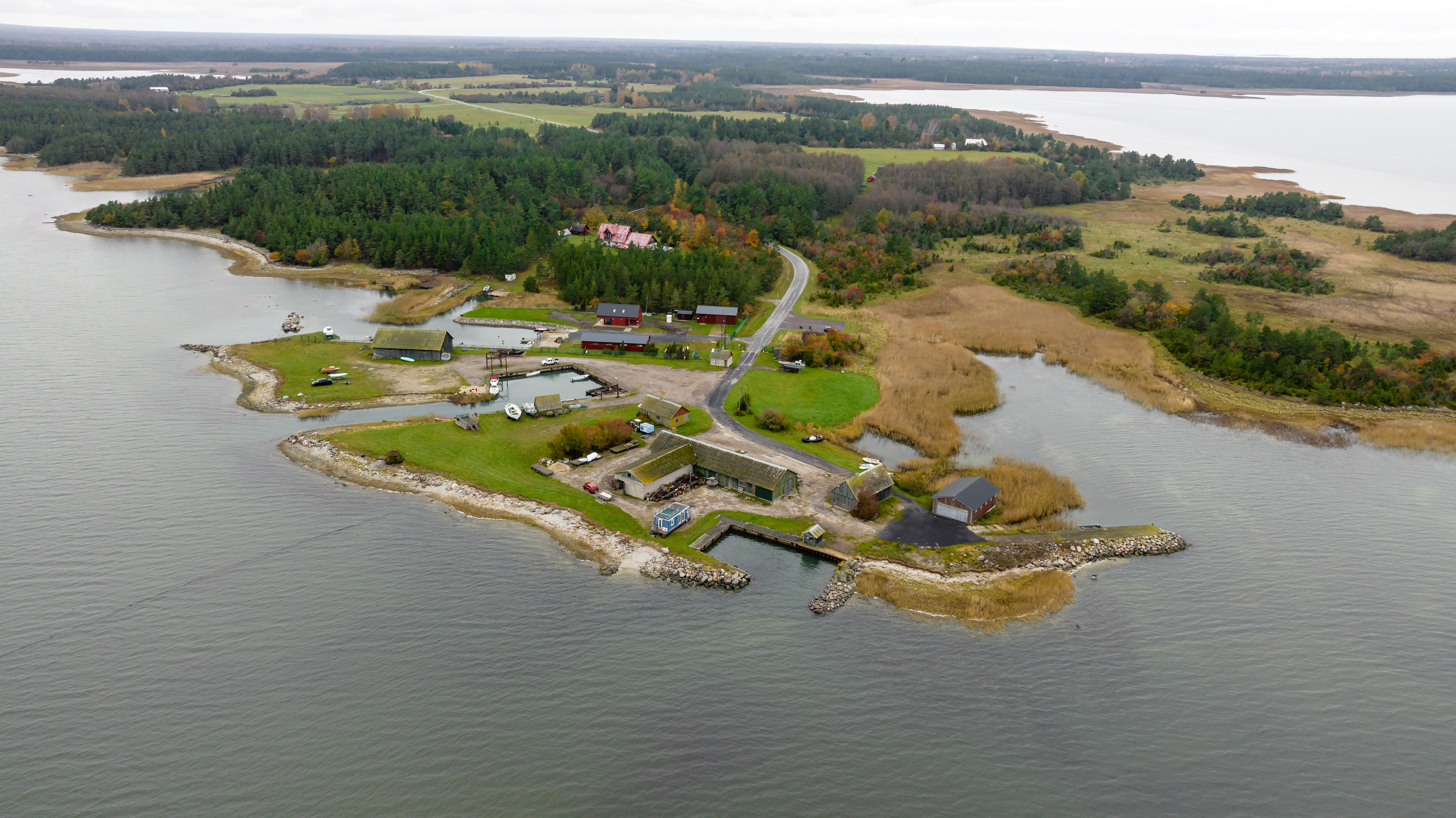
- Salinõmme harbour

- Location within Estonia
- Coordinates: 58°50′N 22°57′E
- Country: Estonia
- County: Hiiu County
- Parish: Hiiumaa Parish
- Time zone: UTC+2 (EET)
  - Summer (DST): UTC+3 (EEST)

Salinõmme is a village in Hiiumaa Parish, Hiiu County in northwestern Estonia.

== Geography ==
Salinõmme is located on a peninsula of the same name, with Salinõmme Bay to the west and Soonlepa Bay to the east. The peninsula was still a separate island on a 1844 map.
