= Fuensanta Nieto =

Spanish architect (born 1957)

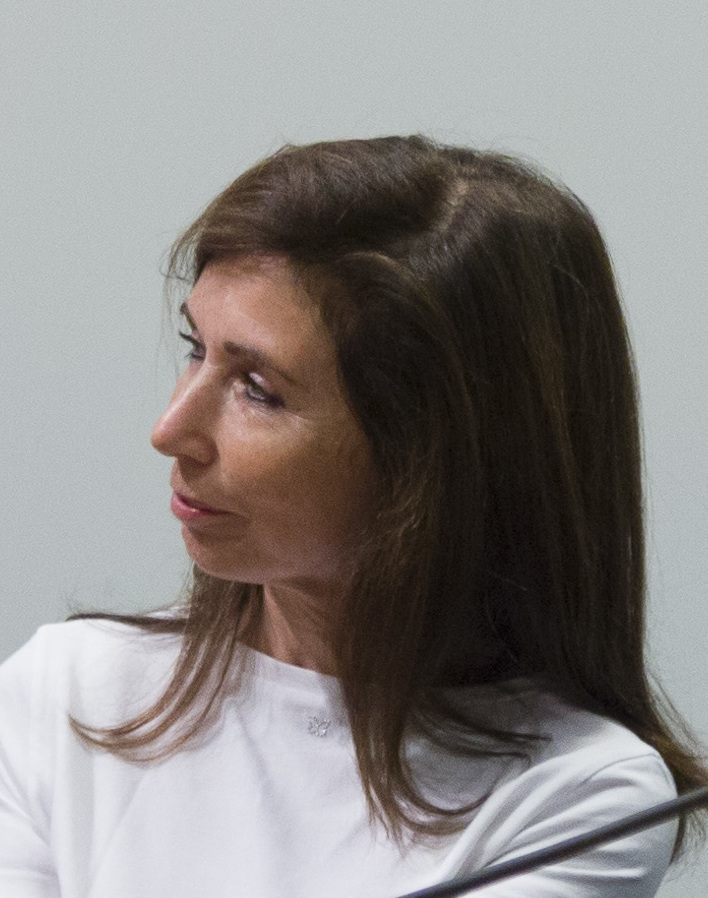
- Born: 18 April 1957; Madrid
- Occupation: Architect
- Awards: Alvar Aalto Medal (2015); Gold Medal of Merit in the Fine Arts (2017)

Fuensanta Nieto de la Cierva (born 18 April 1957) is a Spanish architect. She is known for her work as a partner of Nieto Sobejano Arquitectos, a firm which she co-founded in 1984.

Fuensanta Nieto studied at the Higher Technical School of Architecture of Madrid. From 1986 to 1991 she was co-director of the architectural journal ARQUITECTURA, published by the Colegio Oficial de Arquitectos de Madrid.

She is a recipient of the Alvar Aalto Medal, the firm Nieto Sobejano having been given this award in 2015.

== Works ==
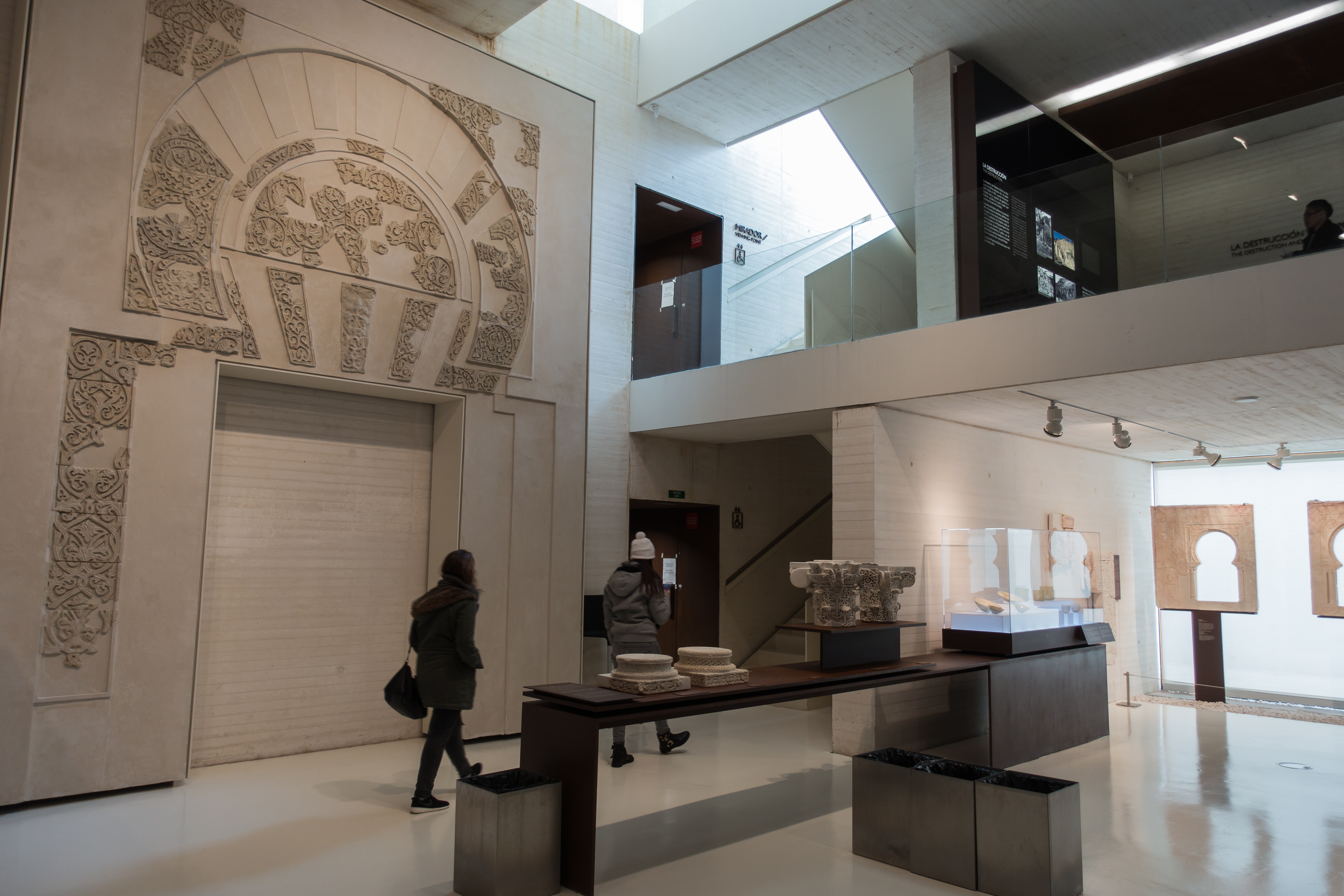
Museum of Medina Azahara

Nieto has been involved in a number of museum and exhibition projects in Spain and other countries. These include a museum constructed in 2005-8 for Medina Azahara, an archaeological site near Córdoba. The building was designed so as not to impose itself on the landscape of Medina Azahara (which has since been declared a World Heritage Site). A project in Estonia, the Arvo Pärt Centre, is also integrated into the landscape. This building, an archive for the composer Arvo Pärt, was shortlisted for the Mies van der Rohe Award 2019.
