= Micro Yuan'er Children's Library and Art Centre =

Building in Beijing, China

The Micro Yuan'er Children's Library and Art Centre is located in the heart of Beijing, China. Located in the hundreds-year-old Cha'er hutong, a Chinese courtyard, surrounded by family homes, the award-winning structure is recognized for its blend of old and new architecture.

Funded by the municipal government, the building is part of an urban development program to enhance the lives of residents while preserving hutong history.

== Micro Hutong Renewal ==
Zhang Ke of ZAO/standard architecture in Beijing designed the children's library and art centre as part of a hutong renewal project. Ke has a Master of Architecture from Harvard and is credited with bringing Ivy League design to the hutongs. The architect believes it is good for the municipality to use small-scale construction as part of urban development.

Located about one kilometre from Tiananmen Square and near a major mosque, the Cha'er hutong measures 350 square metres. It was a typical Da-Za-Yuan, which means big, messy courtyard, where up to a dozen families had lived for about 400 years. The hutong contained a temple that was turned into residences in the 1950s. The municipal government's Dashilar Investment requested proposals for how to use the space, choosing a children's library. The project's construction took place between 2012 and 2014.

Since the 1950s, most families living there had added on a small kitchen in the courtyard. Although most recent renovations eliminate add-on structures like these, the architects redesigned, renovated, and reused the remaining structures to create the library and art spaces, preserving this oft-neglected layer of Beijing's contemporary civil history.

The builders constructed the 9 metre square library beneath the pitched roof of another building in the courtyard. It is made of plywood and concrete mixed with Chinese ink to blend with its grey urban surroundings. Steps inside the building create an elevated reading area in front of a wide window, encouraging children to climb up and read a book. Builders also transformed a former kitchen beneath a large Chinese scholar tree into a six-metre square micro art space using recycled bricks.

In 2016, the Hutong Children's Library and Art Centre project received the Aga Khan Award for Architecture, one of six winners worldwide. The award jury praised the project for its modification and re-use of a historic building and its embodiment of life in traditional courtyard residences. The hutong renewal project appeared at Beijing Design Week 2014 and the Venice Architecture Biennale 2016. CNN called the architect a "game changer in Chinese design" for his various courtyard projects.

== Facilities ==
The building contains a children's library and an elevated reading nook where children can read in front of a picture window. There is a miniature art space nearby. In one room, an artist may show children how to create paper cut art while a multifunction space is suitable for showing movies. A large, hundreds-year-old scholar tree at the site provides a place for children to play.

== Social Impact ==
Local residents see the hutong renewal project as good for the community as the area was transformed from piles of rubbish to a place where children come to play and learn. Hutong life revived through this project and enriched community bonds. The project helped preserve historic buildings instead of leveling the area for large-scale construction, bridging the gap between modern development and tradition. Hutong renewal helps keep families in the community where they have lived possibly for hundreds of years instead of relocating to distant apartment towers, preserving their community bonds.
