= Nieto Sobejano Arquitectos =

Spanish architecture firm

- Type: Private (S.L.P / GmbH)
- Founded: 1984
- Founders: Fuensanta Nieto, Enrique Sobejano
- Headquarters: Madrid, Spain, and Berlin, Germany
- Number of employees: Approx. 40
- Website: www.nietosobejano.com

Nieto Sobejano Arquitectos is an architecture firm, founded in 1984 by Fuensanta Nieto and Enrique Sobejano with offices in Madrid and, since 2007, in Berlin.

== Partners ==
Fuensanta Nieto (Madrid, Spain, 1957) has worked as an architect since graduating from the Universidad Politécnica de Madrid and the Graduate School of Architecture and Planning at Columbia University in New York in 1981. She is a founding partner of Nieto Sobejano Arquitectos and a professor at the Universidad Europea de Madrid. Fuensanta Nieto lectures on architecture and participates in juries and symposia at various institutions around the world. From 1986 to 1991 she was co-director of the architectural journal Arquitectura, published by the Colegio Oficial de Arquitectos de Madrid.

Enrique Sobejano (Madrid, Spain, 1957) has worked as an architect since graduating from the Universidad Politécnica de Madrid and the Graduate School of Architecture and Planning at Columbia University in New York in 1981. He is professor at the Universität der Künste Berlin (UdK), where he holds the chair of Principles of Design. He has been a visiting critic and lecturer at various international universities worldwide. From 1986 to 1991 he was co-director of the architectural journal Arquitectura, published by the Colegio Oficial de Arquitectos de Madrid. He chairs and participates in international conferences and juries and is a founding partner of Nieto Sobejano Arquitectos.

== Studio ==
As well as being widely published in international magazines and books, the firm's work was exhibited at the Biennale di Venezia in 2000, 2002, 2006 and 2012, at the Museum of Modern Art (MoMA) in New York, in 2006, at the Kunsthaus in Graz in 2008 and at the MAST Foundation in Bologna in 2014. It is the recipient of the 2007 National Prize for Restoration from the Spanish Ministry of Culture and the 2010 Nike Prize issued by the Bund Deutscher Architekten (BDA), as well as the Aga Khan Award for Architecture (2010), the Piranesi Prix de Rome (2011), the European Museum of the Year Award (2012), the Hannes Meyer Prize (2012), AIA Honorary Fellowship (2015) and the Alvar Aalto Medal in 2015. Major works include two projects at Córdoba (the Madinat al-Zahra Museum and the Contemporary Art Centre), the Kunstmuseum Moritzburg Halle (Saale) and extensions to the San Telmo Museum in San Sebastian, and the Joanneum in Graz. Nieto Sobejano Arquitectos currently has projects in Germany, Spain, Austria, Estonia and Morocco. Two monographs have been published about their work: "Nieto Sobejano. Memory and Invention" (Hatje Cantz Verlag, Ostfildern, Germany, 2013) and "Fuensanta Nieto, Enrique Sobejano. Architetture" (Mondadori Electa Spa, Milano, Italy, 2014).

== Awards ==
- Aga Khan Award for Architecture 2010
- Award for Excellence in Architecture of the State of Saxonia 2010, Germany
- Via Arquitectura’s Award for excellence in national and international architecture 2010, Spain
- de:Nike (Architekturpreis) BDA 2010, Germany
- Piranesi Prix de Rome 2011, Italy
- WAN Awards 2011, 21 for 21, Great Britain
- Hannes-Meyer Award 2012, Germany
- Award of the VIII BIENAL Iberoamericana de Arquitectura y Urbanismo 2012, Spain
- European Museum of the Year Award, Museum es:Museo de Medina Azahara, 2012
- Alvar Aalto Medal 2015

== Exhibitions ==
- 2006: On Site: New Architecture in Spain, MoMA, New York City, USA
- 2008: Nieto Sobejano: arquitectura concreta, de:Architekturforum Aedes, Berlin, Germany and Kunsthaus Graz, Graz, Austria
- 2013: Nieto Sobejano: Memory and Invention, Architekturgalerie München e.V., Munich, Germany
- 2014: Nieto Sobejano Arquitectos, MAST Foundation: Galleria dell’architettura, Bologna, Italy

== Publications ==
- Oscar Rueda: Sobejano Nieto: 1996–2001 Displacements. Rueda, Madrid 2002, ISBN 978-84-7207-131-5
- de:Jürgen Tietz: Nieto Sobejano - Das neue Kunstmuseum in Halle: de:Stiftung Moritzburg. Hirmer, München 2008, ISBN 978-3-7774-5075-9
- Fuensanta Nieto, Enrique Sobejano (Hrsg.): Nieto Sobejano: Memory and Invention. Hatje Cantz, Ostfildern 2013, ISBN 978-3-7757-3619-0
- Fuensanta Nieto, Enrique Sobejano (Hrsg.): Monograph N.S. 2014. Electa Architecttura, Mailand 2014, ISBN 978-88-9180-228-6
