= Zhang Ke (architect) =

Chinese architect

Zhang Ke 张轲
- Born: 1970 (age 55–56)
- Occupation: Architect
- Awards: 2016 Aga Khan Award for Architecture; 2017 Alvar Aalto Medal
- Buildings: Novartis Campus Building, Shanghai
- Projects: Transformation of hutongs in Beijing

Zhang Ke (Chinese: 张轲; pinyin: Zhāng Kē; born 1970) is a Chinese architect. Zhang Ke is a graduate of Tsinghua University in Beijing and the Harvard Graduate School of Design at Harvard University in Cambridge, Massachusetts, USA. In 2001, he founded his studio ZAO/standardarchitecture (标准营造).

Zhang Ke is a recipient of the 2016 Aga Khan Award for Architecture and the 2017 Alvar Aalto Medal. In 2016, he represented China at the Venice Biennale of Architecture.

== Selected works ==
- Micro Yuan'er Children's Library and Art Centre, 2012-14
- Novartis Campus Building, 2016, in Shanghai in China
- Transformation of Beijings old hutongs
- Museum for China Academy of Art (CAA) in Hangzhou.
- Longji Primary School in Guangxi, a donation from Zhang Ke's firm to an underdeveloped rural community, which will be crowd-funded.

== Bibliography ==
- Caterina Padoa Schioppa, Roberto Ragione, L’infinita profondità dello spazio interiore, in «Industria Italiana del Cemento» (n. 864, 2026), Pubblicemento, Roma 2026, pp. 98-103. [ISSN: 0019-7637]
