= Michael Pärt =

Estonian music producer and editor (born 1977)

- Michael Pärt at 2013 MPSE Golden Reel Awards

Background information
- Born: 17 August 1977 (age 49)
- Origin: Tallinn, Estonia
- Genre: Soundtrack
- Occupation: Music producer
- Website: paert.com

Michael Pärt (Estonian pronunciation: [ˈpær̺t], born 17 August 1977) is an Estonian music producer and music editor.

Since 2010 he has been chairman of the board of the Arvo Pärt Centre. He also owns the music editing company Michael Pärt Musik.

== Biography ==
Michael Pärt was born as the younger son of classical composer Arvo Pärt and his wife Nora. In 1980 the family left the Soviet Union for political reasons. Michael Pärt spent his childhood and youth in Austria, Germany, and the United Kingdom before returning to Estonia in 2008.

He holds a Master's degree in Music for Composing for Film and TV with distinction from Kingston University in London.

=== Film and music ===
He has worked with several notable people within the music and film industries, including Icelandic singer Björk; composers Danny Elfman, Alexandre Desplat, and Howard Shore; and directors Peter Jackson, Francis Ford Coppola, and Tom Hooper.

His most recent film projects working as a music editor were Tom Hooper's The Danish Girl (2015) and Justin Chadwick's Tulip Fever (2017).

Additionally, he contributed to award-winning projects such as the BAFTA-winning LazyTown and the Grammy-nominated albums Volta and Vulnicura by Björk and Neon Bible by Arcade Fire.

=== Arvo Pärt Centre ===
In 2008 Michael Pärt returned to Estonia to establish the Arvo Pärt Centre which he chairs. The foundation preserves Arvo Pärt's creative contribution to the arts for future generations.
