= Merenuka =

Village in Estonia

- Village
- Location within Estonia
- Coordinates: 59.404°N 24.282°E
- Country: Estonia
- County: Harju County
- Parish: Lääne-Harju Parish
- Time zone: UTC+2 (EET)
  - Summer (DST): UTC+3 (EEST)

Merenuka is a village in Lääne-Harju Parish, Harju County in Estonia. With an area of 6 ha (15 acres) it is the smallest village in Estonia. Merenuka village was established 15 April 2019 on the former territory of Keila-Joa small borough.
