= Undu Bay =

Bay in Estonia

- Undu laht (Estonian)
- Location within Estonia
- Coordinates: 58.4642°N 23.1954°E
- Basin countries: Estonia

Undu Bay (Estonian: Undu laht) is a bay in Estonia. It in the northern Gulf of Riga and is highly isolated. It is characterized by having muddy deposits, dense bottom vegetation, and low salinity. In 2005, an exotic species of crustacean, Gammarus lacustris, was identified in the bay.
