= Suur Katel =

Bay in Estonia

Coordinates: 58°10′05″N 22°24′25″E

Suur Katel (Estonian: Suur katel) is bay in Saare County Estonia; part of Baltic Sea.

It is located between Sõrve peninsula and Abruka island.

Its area is about 158 km^{2}. The deepest point is 13 m, but mostly the depth is under 10 m.
