= Tegnestuen Vandkunsten =

Danish architecture firm

vandkunsten
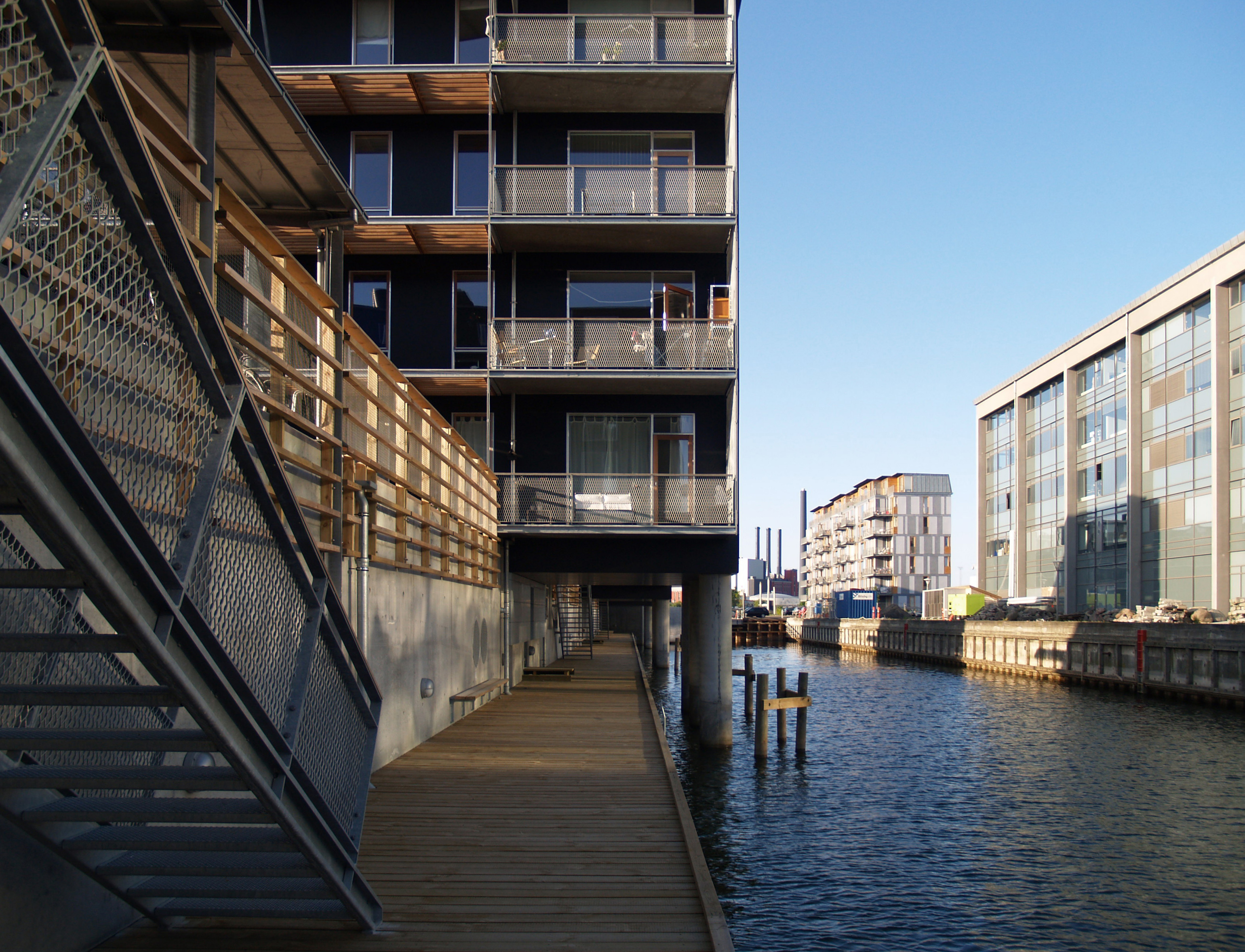
- Teglværkshavnen housing, Copenhagen, 2003-08

Practice information
- Key architects: Svend Algren, Jens Thomas Arnfred, Michael Sten Johnsen, Steffen Kragh, Jan Albrechtsen, Ole Halfdan Andersen, Flemming Ibsen, Pernille Schyum Poulsen, Søren Nielsen, Thomas Nybo Rasmussen
- Founded: 1970
- Location: Copenhagen

Significant works and honors
- Awards: C. F. Hansen Medal (1986, 1998); Nykredit Architecture Prize (1990); Alvar Aalto Medal (2009)

Tegnestuen Vandkunsten a/s, often referred to simply as Vandkunsten, is a Danish architectural firm founded in 1970. Vandkunsten were awarded the Alvar Aalto Medal in 2009 for being a "modern interpretor [sic] and elaborator of Alvar Aalto's ideological heritage". This was the first time that the Alvar Aalto Medal was awarded to a team of architects instead of an individual. Their pioneering and influential work in residential architecture and housing developments has been described as characterized by convertibility, communality, residential involvement, dense-low rise, and sustainable development. The office comprising around 30 designers, is located in Copenhagen, while having completed projects in Scandinavia and other parts of Europe as well.

== History ==
Tegnestuen Vandkunsten was established in 1970 by the architects Svend Algren, Jens Thomas Arnfred, Michael Sten Johnsen and Steffen Kragh. The partner group has been joined in 2000 by the architects Jan Albrechtsen and Ole Halfdan Andersen and in 2008 by the architects Flemming Ibsen, Pernille Schyum Poulsen, Søren Nielsen and landscape architect Thomas Nybo Rasmussen.

== Works ==
One of the office's early works which later became influential was Tinggården, a residential district in Herfølge, a suburb just south of Køge in Denmark (1971–78), notable for the spatial solutions aimed to promote social coherence, the minimization of construction costs through the use of advanced technology and simple materials, and the "relaxed yet modern" expression of the Danish traditions. The social housing complex comprises 78 houses with an average area of 87m².

Another early work, the Blue Corner, (Danish: et Blå Hjørne) (1983–89) in Copenhagen's Christianshavn district is characterized by the creative use of the composition of the landscape.

Dianas Have at Hørsholm, Denmark (1991–92), and Hestra Parkstad in Sweden (1991–92), became models for the 1990s row house districts in which narrow 'fingers' of buildings emerged into the surrounding landscape. The details of the interiors and exterior and innovative use of materials were meant to enhance the daily life of the people in an exemplary manner.

The conversion of the Torpedo Boat Shipyard at Holmen, Copenhagen into a block of flats at the turn of the millennium (2001–03), became exemplary in the way the designers created a unique place for living. The steel and concrete Torpedo Hall, constructed in 1954, served as a maintenance hall for torpedo boats. In the conversion the architects left the structural elements intact to emphasize the architecture of this 155 meter long building. Instead, a new independent concrete structure has been built, which has the same five meter grid as the columns in the old hall but, shifted by 40 centimeters. The 67 apartments located in the building range from 83 m^{2} to 275 m^{2}.

Their more recent works, such as the Sømærk at Teglholmen (2003–08) and some residential blocks in Ørestaden (2003–08), both in Copenhagen, are remarkable for introducing earthbound social, spatial and functional elements to multi-storey residential constructions.

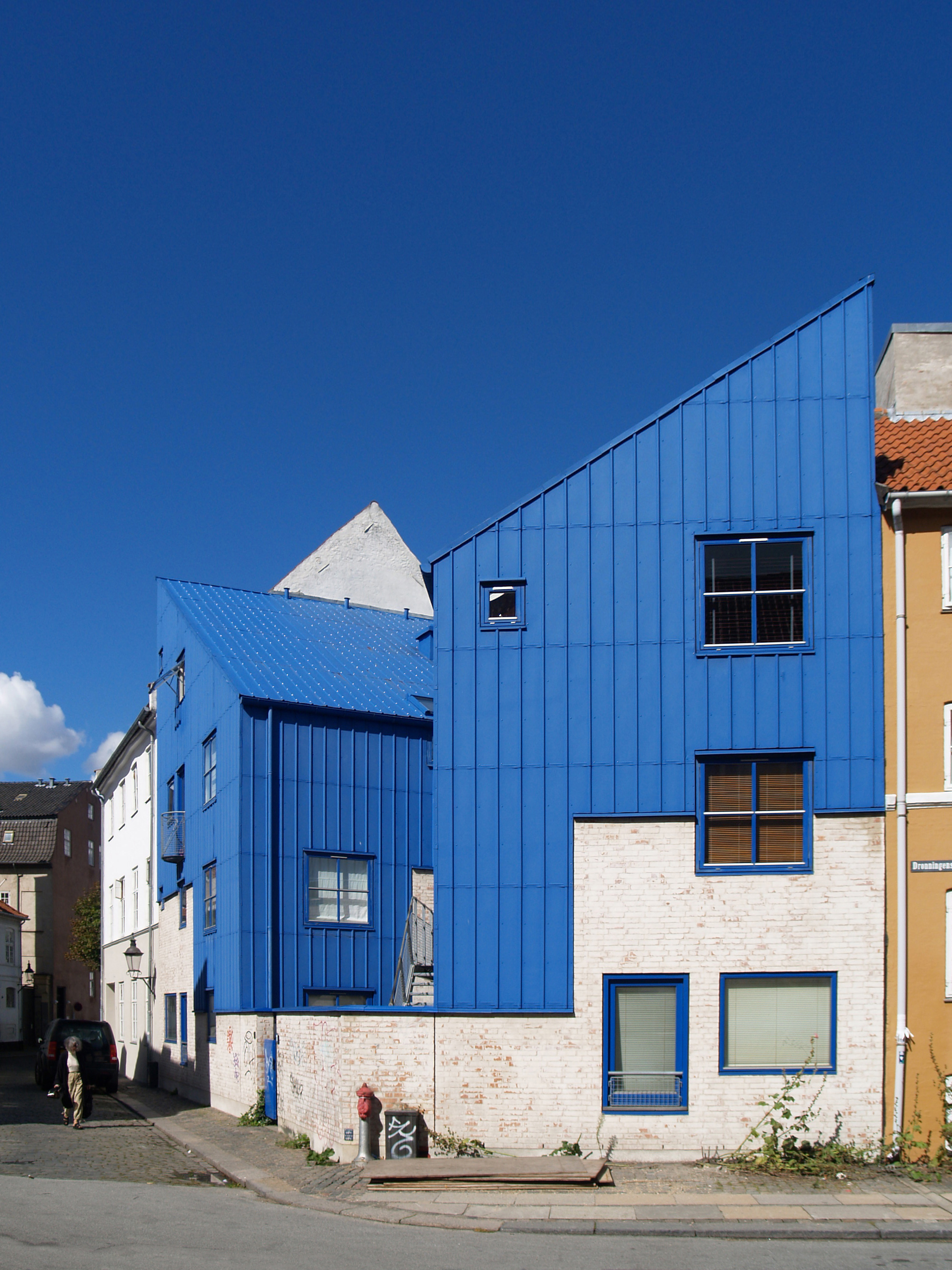
Blue Corner Housing, Christianshavn

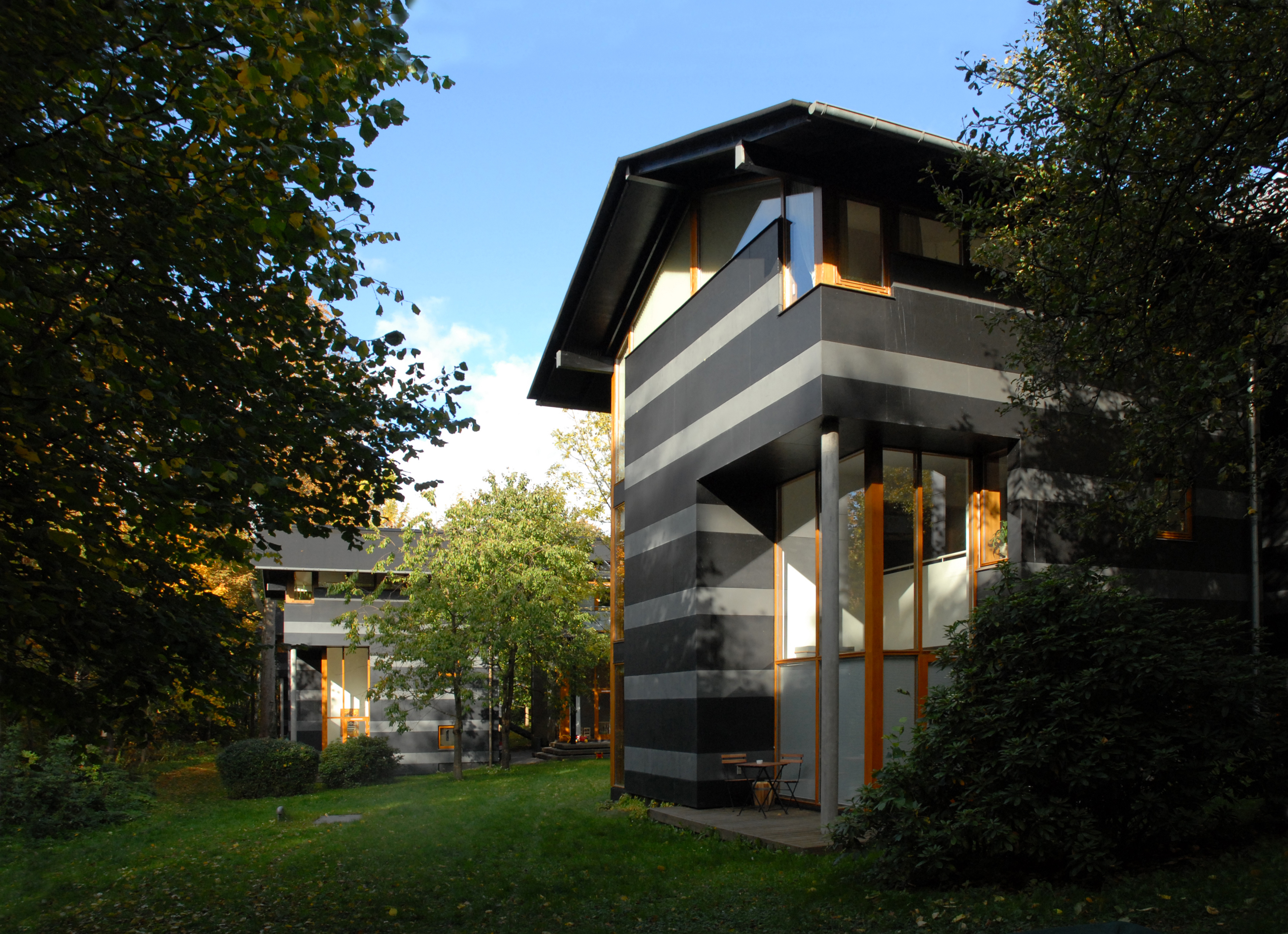
Dianas Have, Hørsholm

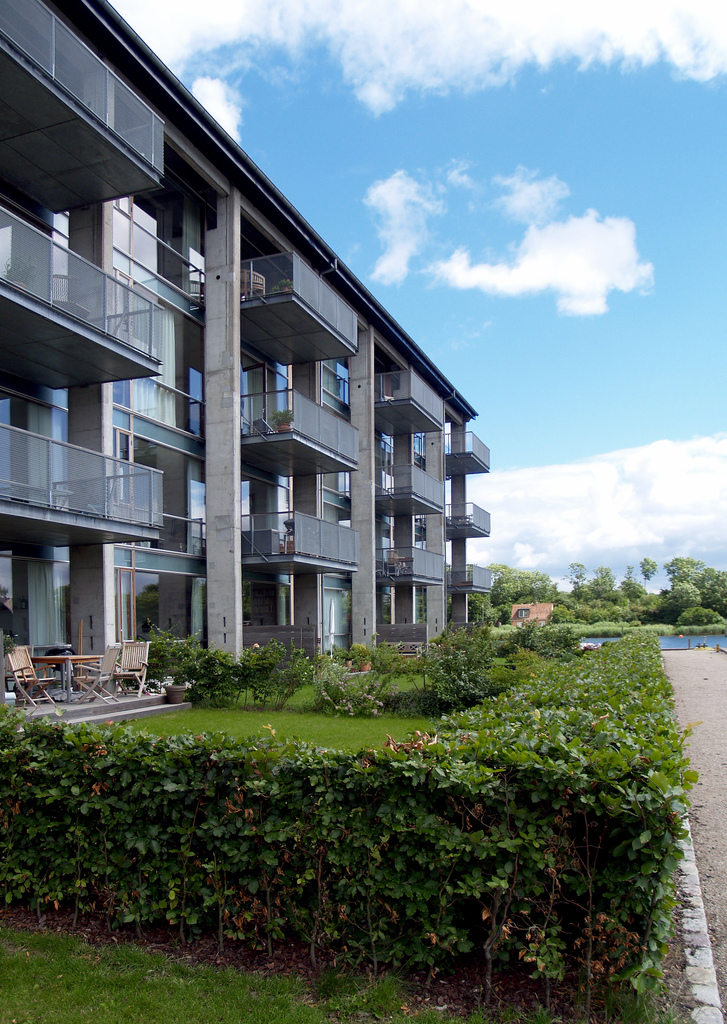
Torpedo Boat Shipyard flats, Holmen

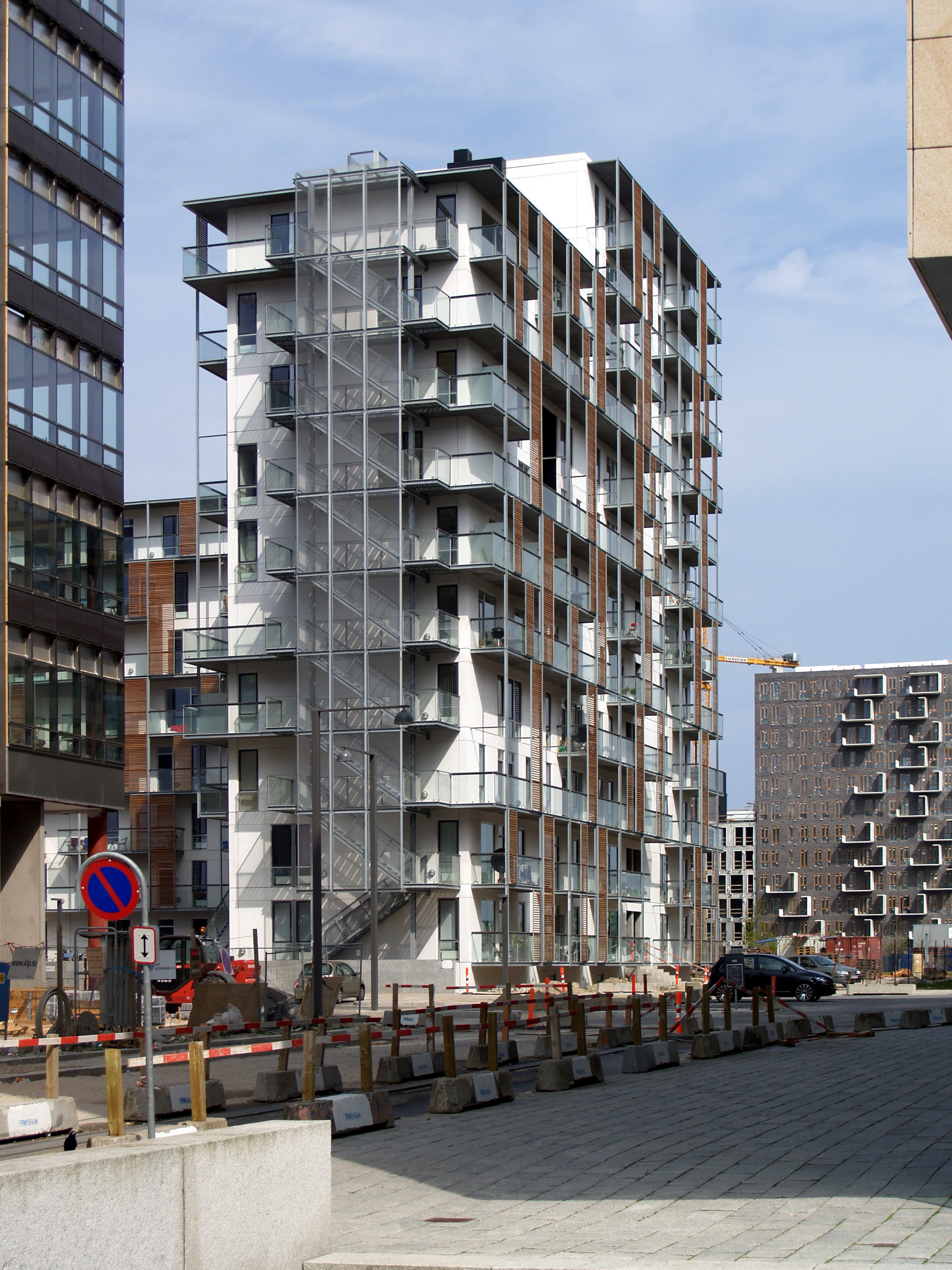
Ørestaden City housing

== See also ==
- Architecture of Denmark
