= Alvar Aalto Medal =

- Description: Given to an individual or group in recognition of a significant contribution to creative architecture.
- Country: Finland
- Presented by: Alvar Aalto Foundation, SAFA, City of Helsinki, Museum of Finnish Architecture, Architecture Information Finland, and The Finnish Society of Architecture
- First award: 1967
- Final award: 2024
- Current recipient: Marie-José Van Hee
- Website: www.alvaraalto.fi

The Alvar Aalto Medal was established in 1967 by the Museum of Finnish Architecture, the Finnish Association of Architects (SAFA), and the Finnish Architectural Society. The Medal has been awarded intermittently since 1967, when the medal was created in honour of Alvar Aalto. The award is given in recognition of a significant contribution to creative architecture. The award was given earlier at the Alvar Aalto Symposium, held every three years in Jyväskylä, Aalto's hometown. Recently the ceremony has been organized on Aalto's birthday, February 3rd, today the Finnish national Day of Architecture.

The Alvar Aalto medal is typically awarded every 3 years in association with 5 organisations: the Alvar Aalto Foundation, The Finnish Association of Architects (SAFA), the City of Helsinki, Foundation for the Museum of Finnish Architecture and Architecture Information Finland, and The Finnish Society of Architecture. The medal, said to be awarded to future star architects; avoiding both currently vogue and the most radical avant-garde work. The medal was last awarded in 2024 to Marie-José Van Hee.

The physical medal awarded to recipients was designed by Finnish architect Heikki Hyytiäinen in collaboration with Alvar Aalto. Its shape resembles a classical amphitheatre, a motif frequently used by Aalto in many of his designs. The medal is cast in bronze.

== Recipients of the Alvar Aalto Medal ==
Year	Recipient	Country
1967	Alvar Aalto	Finland
1973	Hakon Ahlberg	Sweden
1977	James Stirling	United Kingdom
1982	Jørn Utzon	Denmark
1985	Tadao Ando	Japan
1988	Alvaro Siza	Portugal
1992	Glenn Murcutt	Australia
1998	Steven Holl	United States
2003	Rogelio Salmona	Colombia
2009	Tegnestuen Vandkunsten	Denmark
2012	Paulo David	Portugal
2015	Fuensanta Nieto and Enrique Sobejano	Spain
2017	Zhang Ke	China
2020	Bijoy Jain	India
2024	Marie-José Van Hee	Belgium

== See also ==
- List of architecture prizes
