= Joonas Sildre =

Estonian comic artist, illustrator, and graphic designer

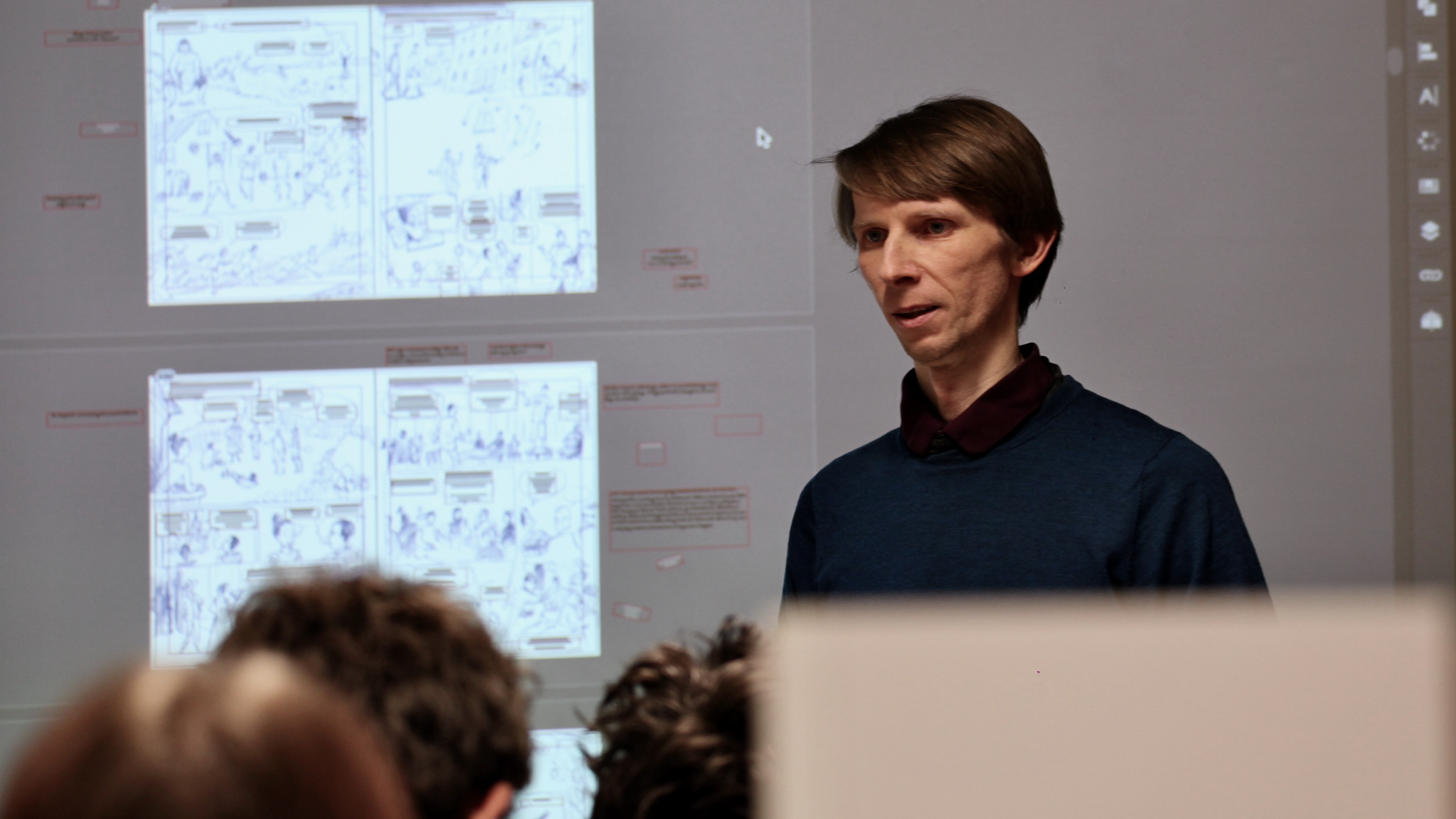
Estonian illustrator and comic artist Joonas Sildre at his book presentation (Tartu, Estonia, January 2024)

Joonas Sildre (born 24 January 1980) is an Estonian comic artist, illustrator, and graphic designer.

== Life and career ==
Sildre was born in Tallinn. He graduated from Estonian Academy of Arts in graphic design.

In total, he has illustrated about 30 children's books. In 2018 he published the graphic novel Kahe heli vahel ("Between Two Sounds") which talks about composer Arvo Pärt. In 2023 he published a graphic novel Värviline mägi ("Colourful Mountain") about Estonian painter Konrad Mägi.

He is the co-founder of the Estonian Comics Society (established in 2013).
