= Leopold Brauneiss =

Austrian composer, musicologist and teacher

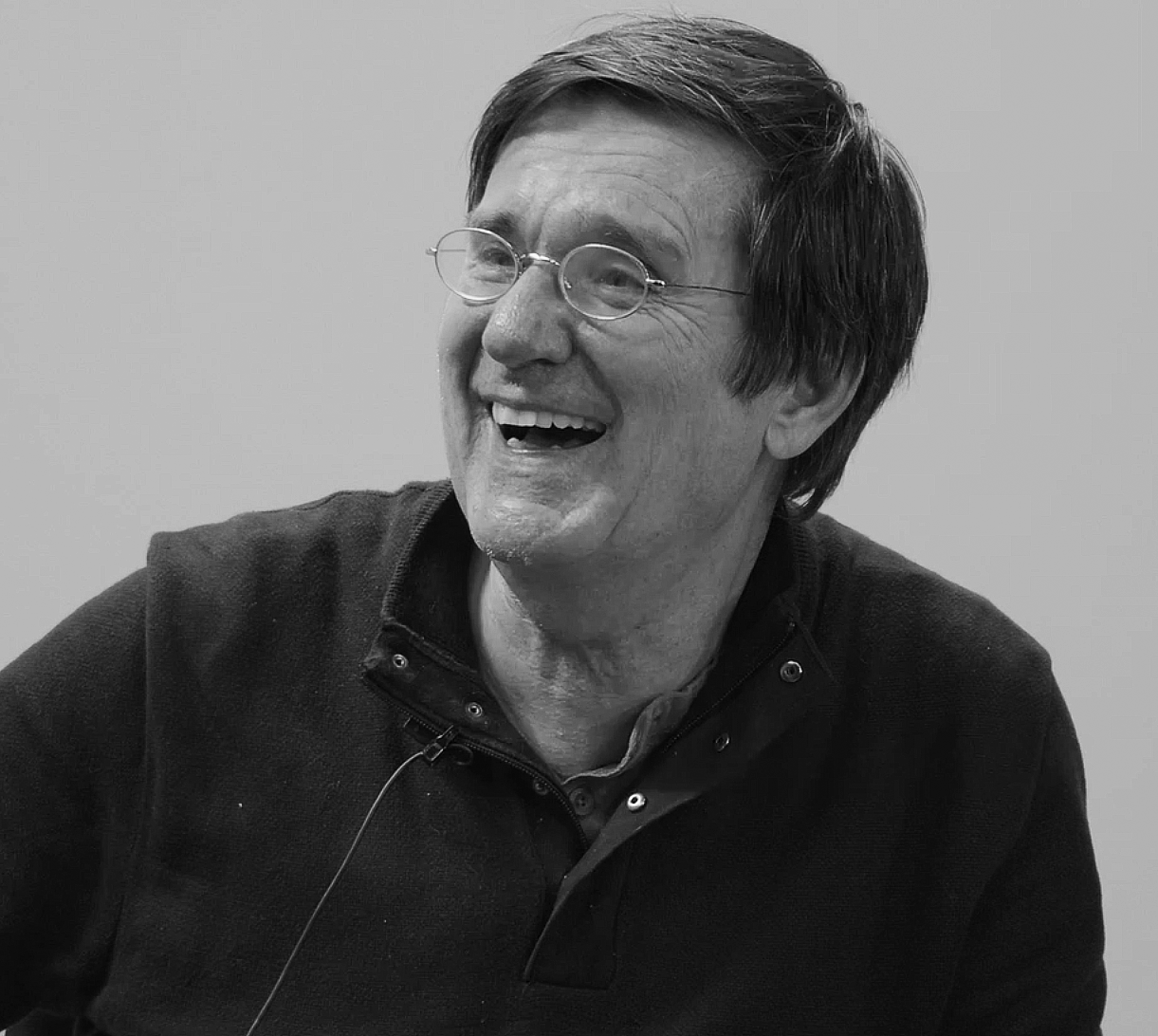
Composer Leopold Brauneiss

Leopold Brauneiss, (b. 1961) is an Austrian composer, musicologist and teacher, based in Vienna. He studied at the University of Vienna (musicology) and the University of Music and Performing Arts (music education, piano, composition with Heinz Kratochwil) and received his doctorate in music in 1988. From 1990 to 2010, he taught music theory at the J.M.-Hauer conservatory Wiener Neustadt. Since 2004, he has been a lecturer for harmony and counterpoint at the University of Vienna, and since 2006 he has held a lectureship in harmony, counterpoint and instrumentation at the Hochschule für Musik und Theater "Felix Mendelssohn Bartholdy" Leipzig. "The main field of his musicological research is the so called Tintinnabuli Style of Arvo Pärt, whom he has known personally for over 20 years. The style's characteristic aesthetics of reduction as well as the simple yet strict structural of its composition techniques has influenced his music to a great extent. He tries, however, to enrich it by adding chromatic or even dodecaphonic elements within the tonal frame." His works have been performed by artists such as Gidon Kremer, ensembles like Kremerata baltica and orchestras like Tonkuenstlerorchester Niederoesterreich and have been presented at prestiguos festivals like Wien modern. He received commissions from Österreichische Kammerysmphoniker and Orgelfestival Lockenhaus.

== Publications ==
- Tintinnabuli: An Introduction, in: Enzo Restagno / Leopold Brauneiss / Saale Kareda / Arvo Pärt, Arvo Pärt in Conversation (transl. by Robert Crow): Dalkey Archive Press 2012, pp. 109-162.
- Musical archetypes: the basic elements of the tintinnabuli style, in: The Cambridge companion to Arvo Pärt, ed. by Andrew Shenton: Cambridge University Press 2012, pp. 49-75.
- Arvo Pärdi tintinnabuli-stiil: arhetüübid ja geomeetria (in Estonian, transl. by Saale Kareda), Arvo Pärdi Keskus 2017.
- Arvo Pärt's Tintinnabuli Style: Contemporary Music Toward a New Middle Ages, in: Studies in medievalism 13: Boydell & Brewer 2005, pp.27-34.
- Characteristics of the Compositional Process in Arvo Pärt's Tintinnabuli Technique, in: Res musica 14 (2022): Eesti Muusika-ja Teatriakadeemia / Arvo Pärdi Keskus / Eesti Muusikateaduse Selts 2022, pp. 62-75.
- The Unification of Opposites: the Tintinnabuli Style in the Light of the Philosophy of Nicolaus Cusanus, transl. by Robert Crow, in: Music & Literature, an arts magazine, Issue One (Fall 2012), pp. 53-60.

== Compositions (selection) ==
- Bucolica für Flöte und Kammerorchester (1991)
- Eirene für Violine und Violoncello (1997/2002/2017)
- Kykloi für Streichquartett (1998/2022)
- Kykloi für Streichorchester (1998/2002)
- Novum Organum für Orgel. Orchester und Kirchenglocken (2003)
- Three Irish Blessings for mixed choir (2004/2018)
- Scottish Psalm for orchestra (2013)
- Chant fuyant für Violoncello solo (2014)
- Nocturne für Violine, Sprecher(in) und Streichorchester (2017/2023)
- Irish Prayer für fünfstimmiges Vokalensemble (2018)
- 12 Preludes für Klavier (2019)
- Farewell für Streichorchester (2019/2020)
- 5 Miniaturen mit 7-12 Tönen für Violine und Tuba (2020)
- Five Bagatelles for string quartet (2020)
- 3 Songs of Departure for mixed choir (2020)
- Callanish für 2 Klaviere (2020/2021)
- Richard an Judith 5 Paraphrasen in Wort und Ton (2021)
- Ave Maria for mixed choir (2022)
- Introduzione, Cavatina e Cabaletta for flute and piano (2022)
- 10 Limericks for mixed choir (2022)
- Metamorphoses nocturnes pour Violon, Violoncelle e Piano (2023)
- Parabolae Salomonis. 6 Biblical Miniatures for Soprano, Choir and Orchestra (2023)
- 6 Seste nello spazio per 9 esecutori (2022/2023)
