= Keila Falls =

Waterfall in Estonia

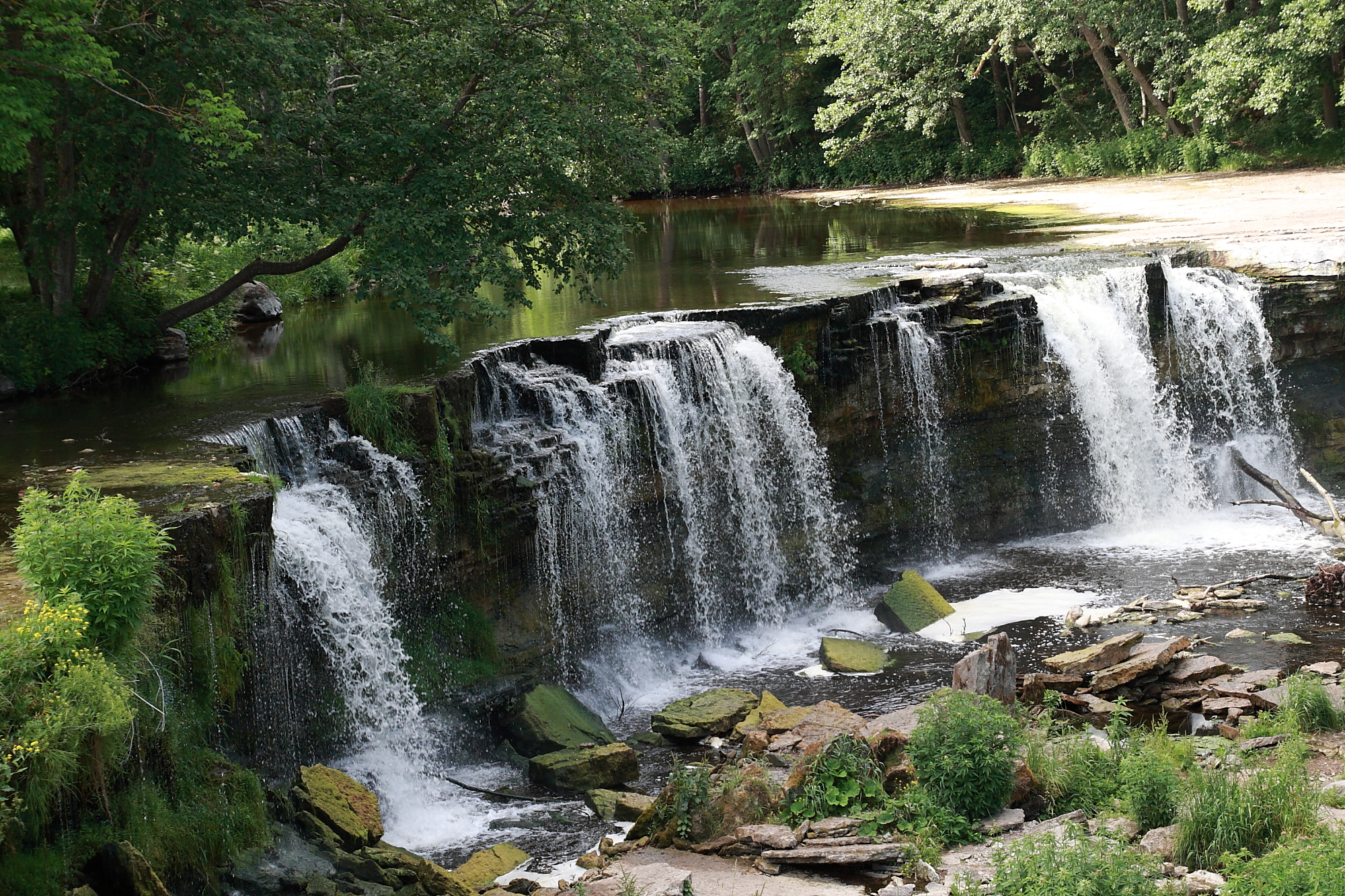
- Interactive map of Keila Falls
- Location: Keila-Joa, Keila Parish, Harju County, Estonia
- Coordinates: 59.396004°N 24.294725°E
- Total height: 6 m (20 ft)
- Total width: 60–70 m (200–230 ft)

Drone video of Keila Falls, Keila-Joa manor, and hydroelectric power station (June 2022)

Keila Falls (Estonian: Keila juga) is a waterfall in northern Estonia on the Keila River. It is the third most powerful waterfall in Estonia after Narva Falls and Jägala Waterfall. It is 6 metres (20 feet) high and 60–70 metres (200–230 feet) wide.

== See also ==
- List of waterfalls
