= Keila-Joa =

Borough in Estonia

- Small borough
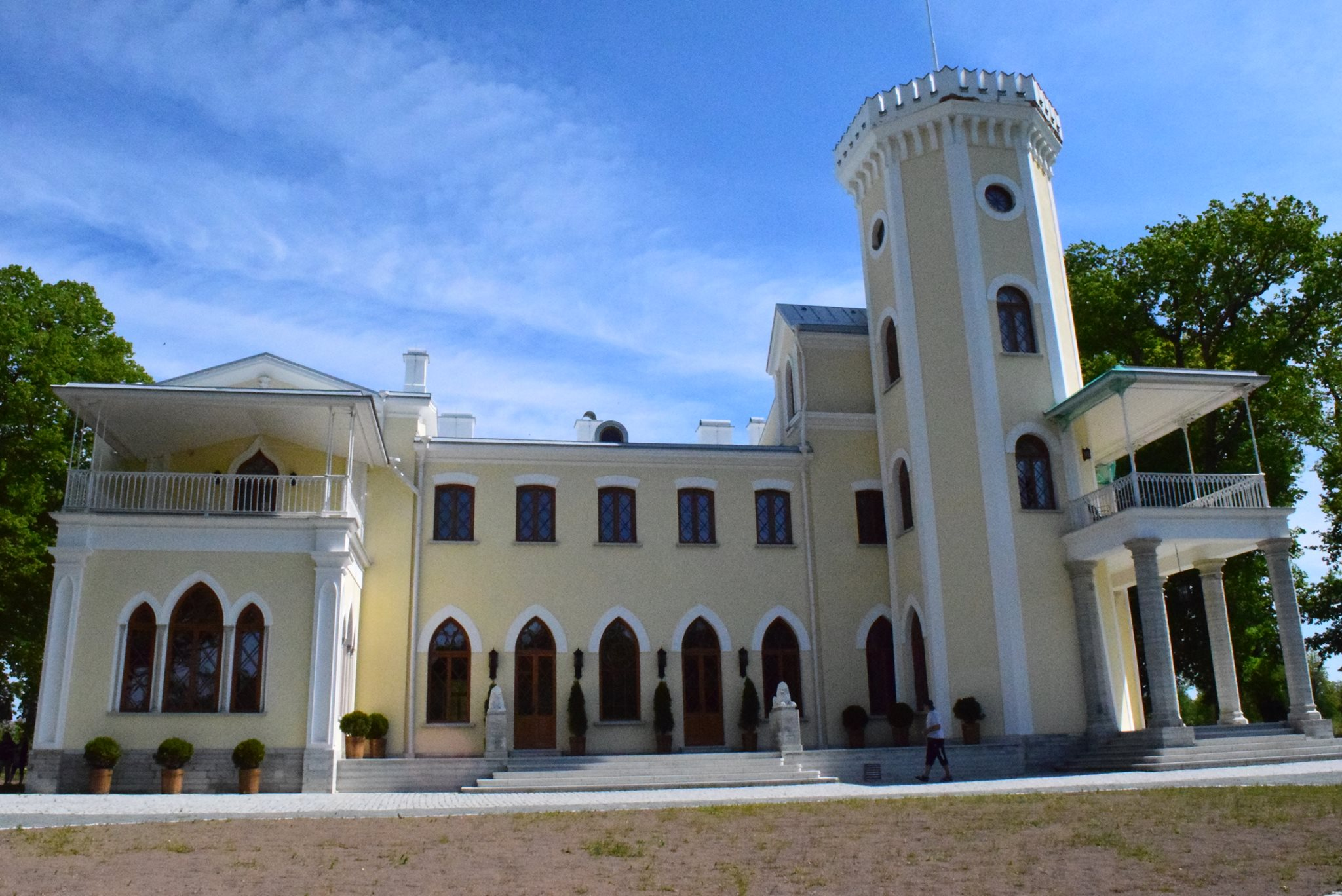
- Keila-Joa Manor

- Location in Estonia
- Coordinates: 59°23′55″N 24°17′55″E
- Country: Estonia
- County: Harju County
- Municipality: Lääne-Harju Parish

Population (01.01.2019)
  - Total: 373

Drone video of Keila Falls, Keila-Joa manor and hydroelectric power station (June 2022)

Keila-Joa is a small borough (Estonian: alevik) in Lääne-Harju Parish, Harju County, northern Estonia. It has a population of 373 (as of 1 January 2019). The Estonian name Keila-Joa literally means "Keila Falls", named after the river, distinguishing it from the town of Keila.

The borough is home to the third most powerful waterfall in Estonia, Keila Falls. In Keila-Joa there is also a small hydroelectric power plant with a capacity of 365 kW.

== Keila-Joa Manor ==
There has been a manor house on the site of Keila-Joa manor (German: Schloss Fall) since the 17th century. The present manor house was built in 1831–1833 and designed by St. Petersburg architect Andrei Stackenschneider. The manor represents one of the earliest examples of neo-Gothic architecture in Estonia. It was built for the family of count Alexander von Benckendorff (whose graves can be found in the park on the opposite bank of Keila River, in Meremõisa) and the building saw many prominent guests during the Imperial years, among others the Russian royal family, famous soprano Henriette Sontag and composer Alexei Lvov.

From 1927 to 1940 it was used by the Estonian Ministry of Foreign Affairs. During the Soviet occupation it was used by the Red Army.

== See also ==
- Keila Falls
- Keila River
