= Keila (river) =

River in Estonia

Coordinates: 59°24′12.97″N 24°16′48.73″E

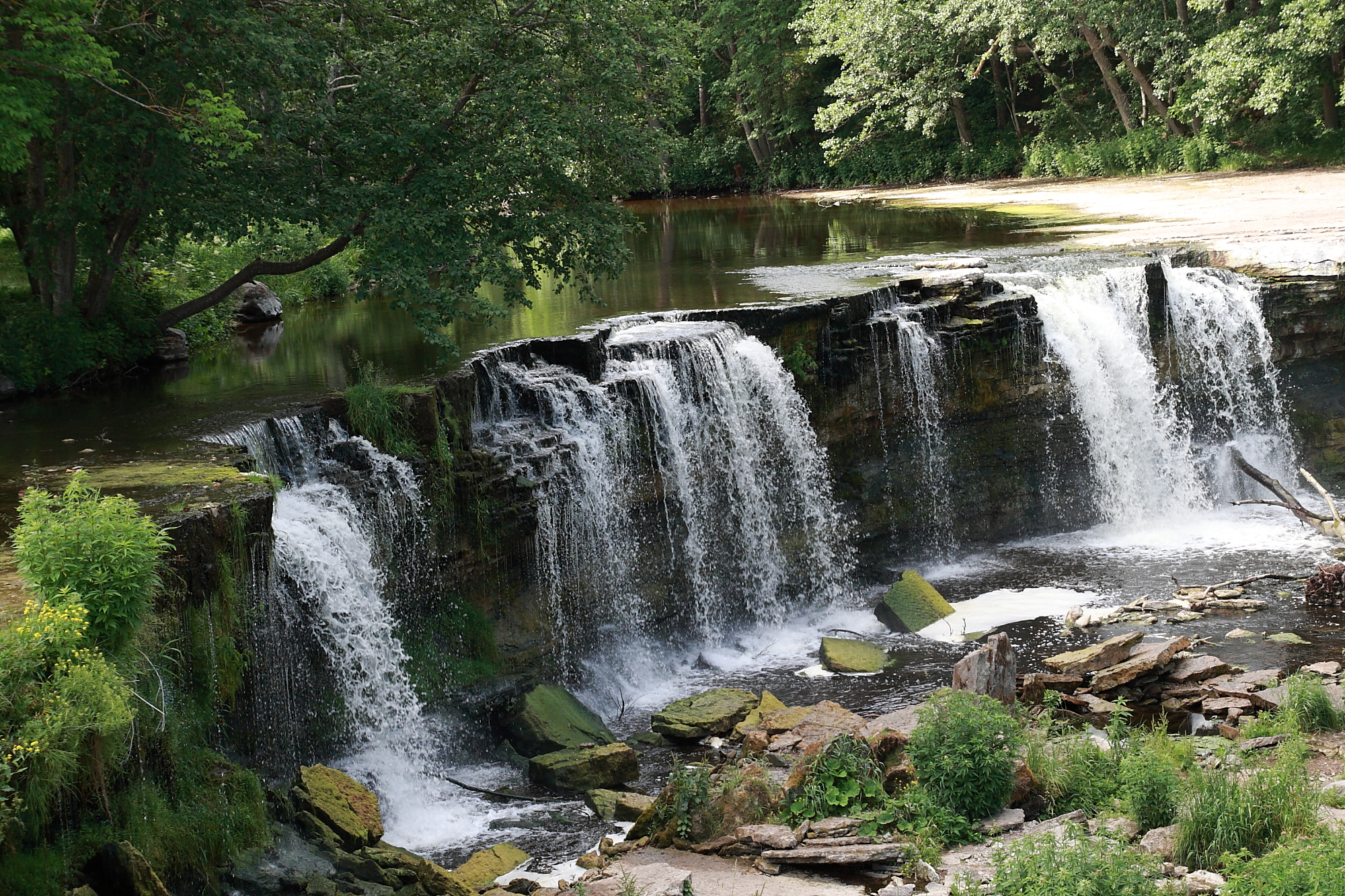
- Keila Falls

Location
- Country: Estonia

Physical characteristics
- Source
  - location: Loosalu Bog near Juuru
- Mouth
  - location: Lohusalu Bay, Gulf of Finland
- Length: 107 km (66 mi)
- Basin size: 682 km^{2} (263 sq mi)
- Discharge
  - average: 6.4 m^{3}/s (230 cu ft/s)

Drone video of the Keila River, Keila Falls, manor, and hydroelectric power station (June 2022)

The Keila is a river in northern Estonia. One attraction along the river is Keila Falls (Estonian: Keila juga).

== Keila River Park ==
Located on the grounds of the former Keila Manor and along the Keila River, Keila River Park (Estonian: Keila Jõepark) dates back to the 17th century. The ruins of a prehistoric sacrificial stone and a small castle can be seen while strolling around the park.

Several bat species also inhabit the vicinity and can be seen soaring through the park on summer nights.

== Gallery ==
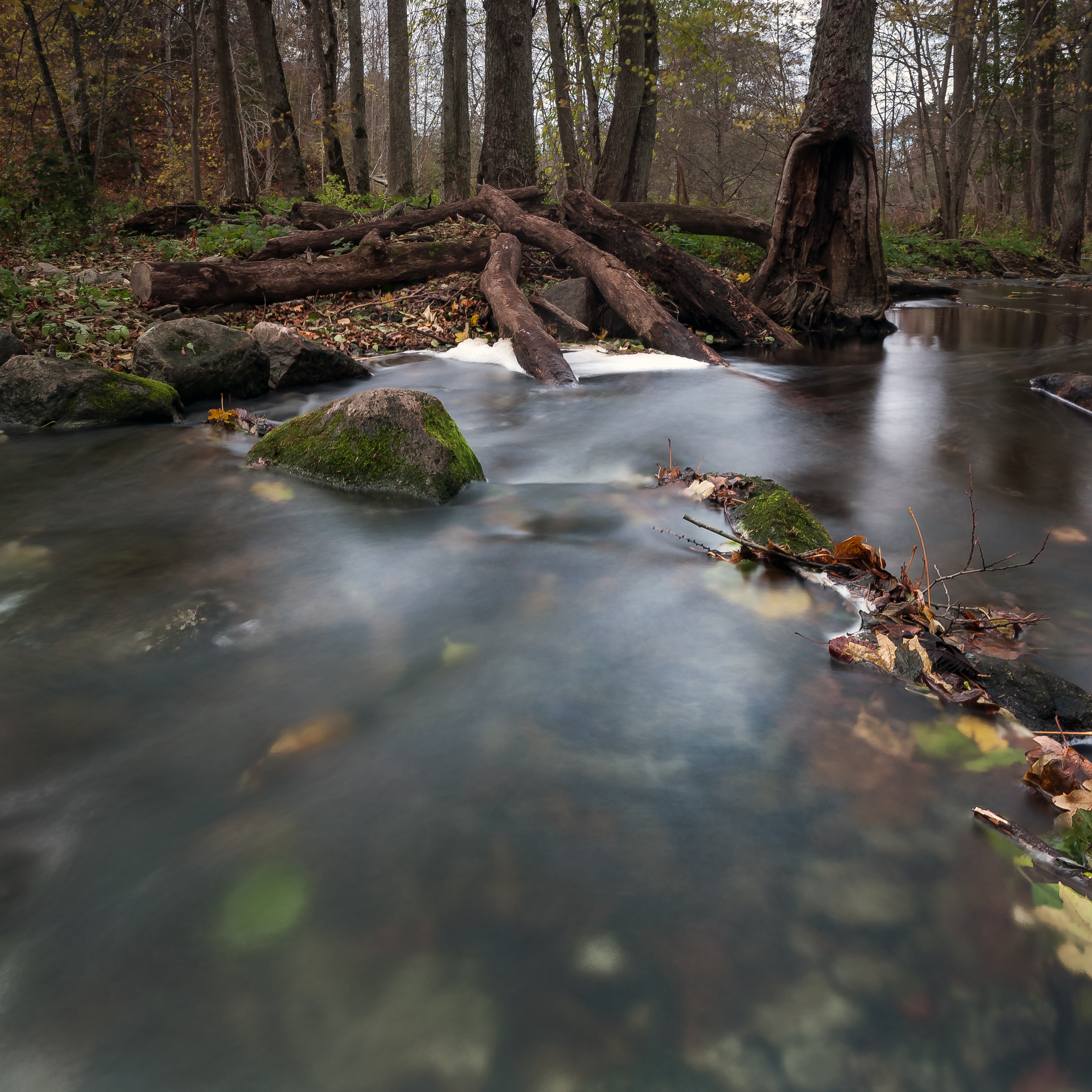

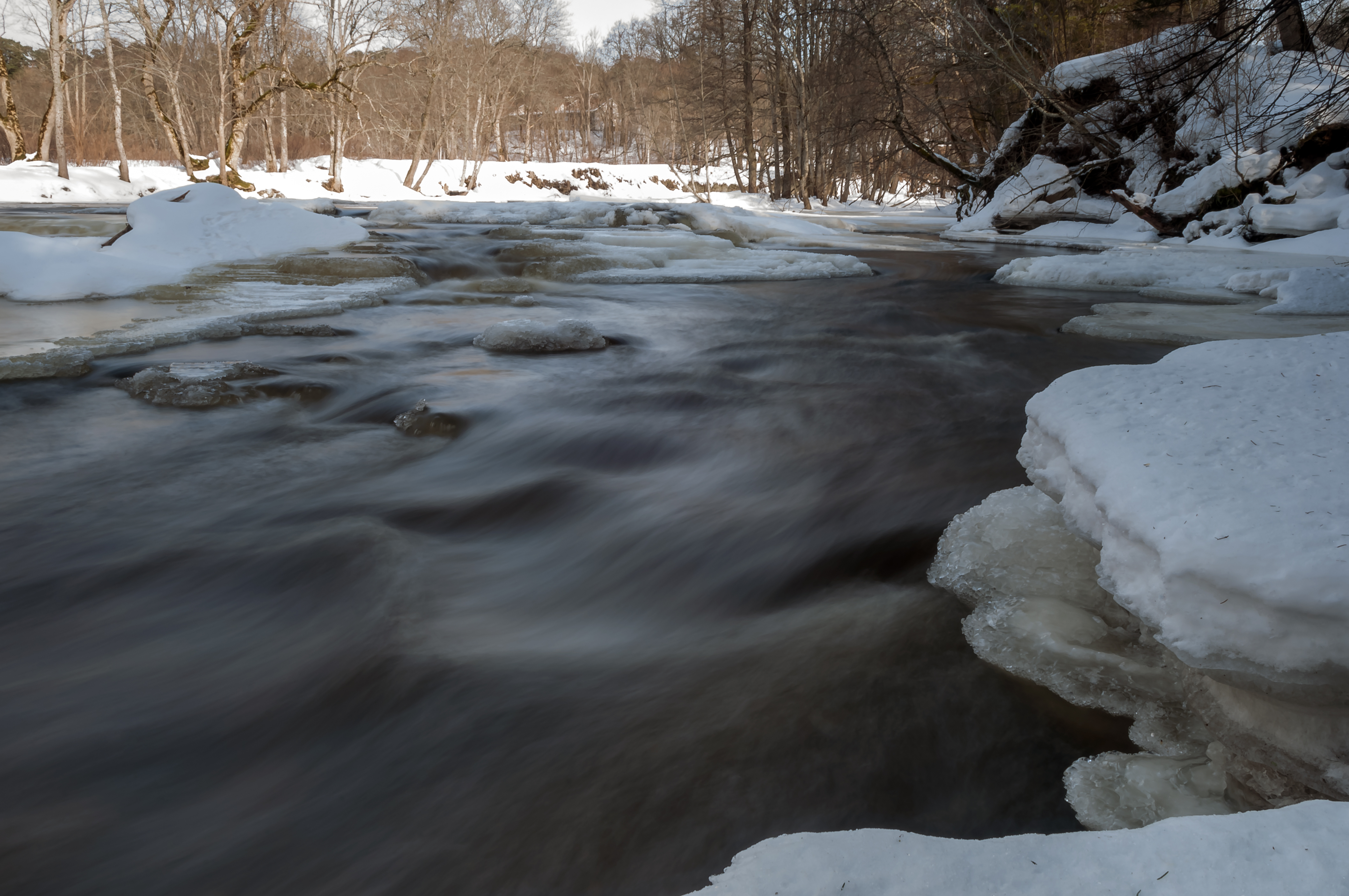

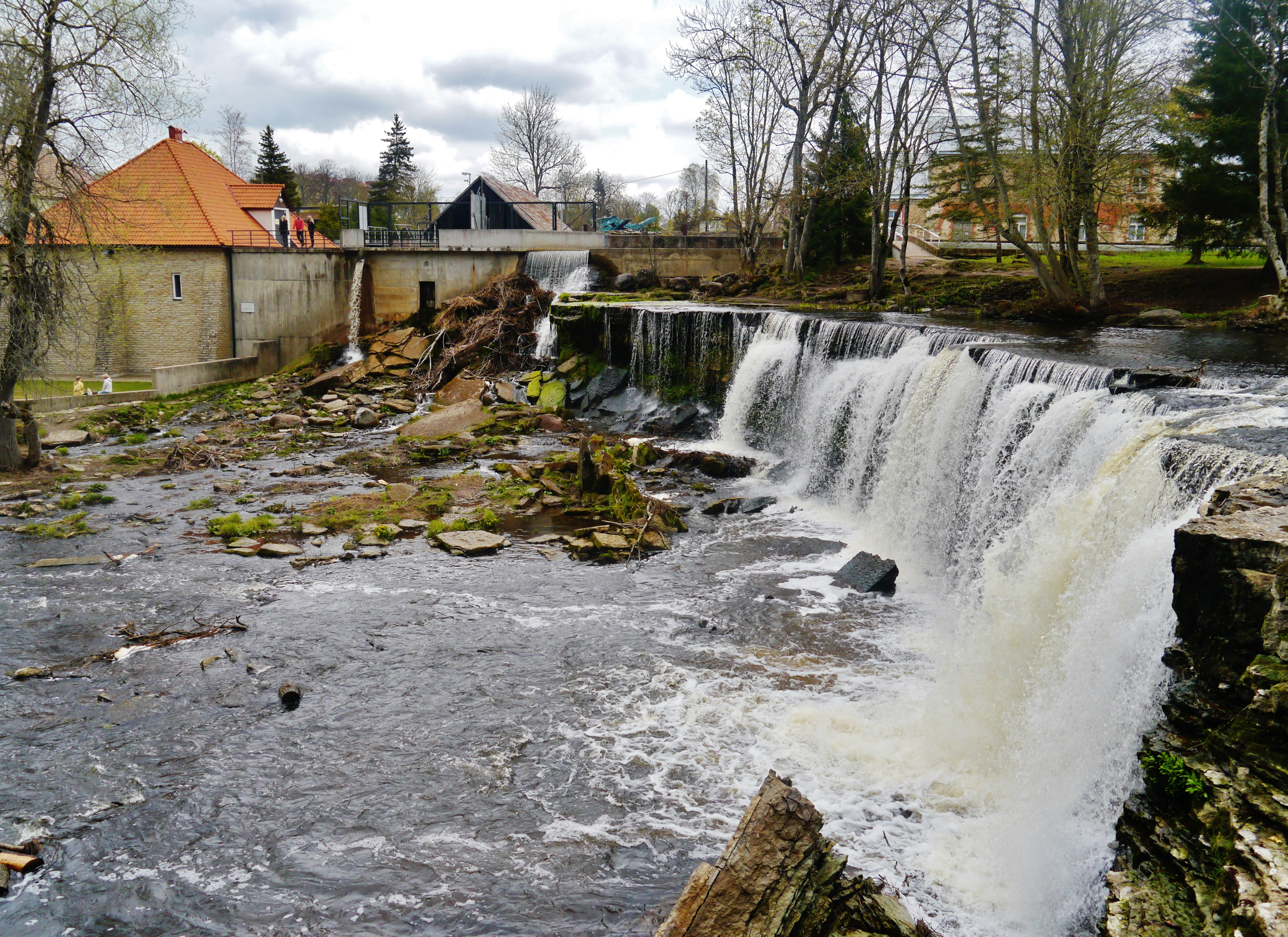

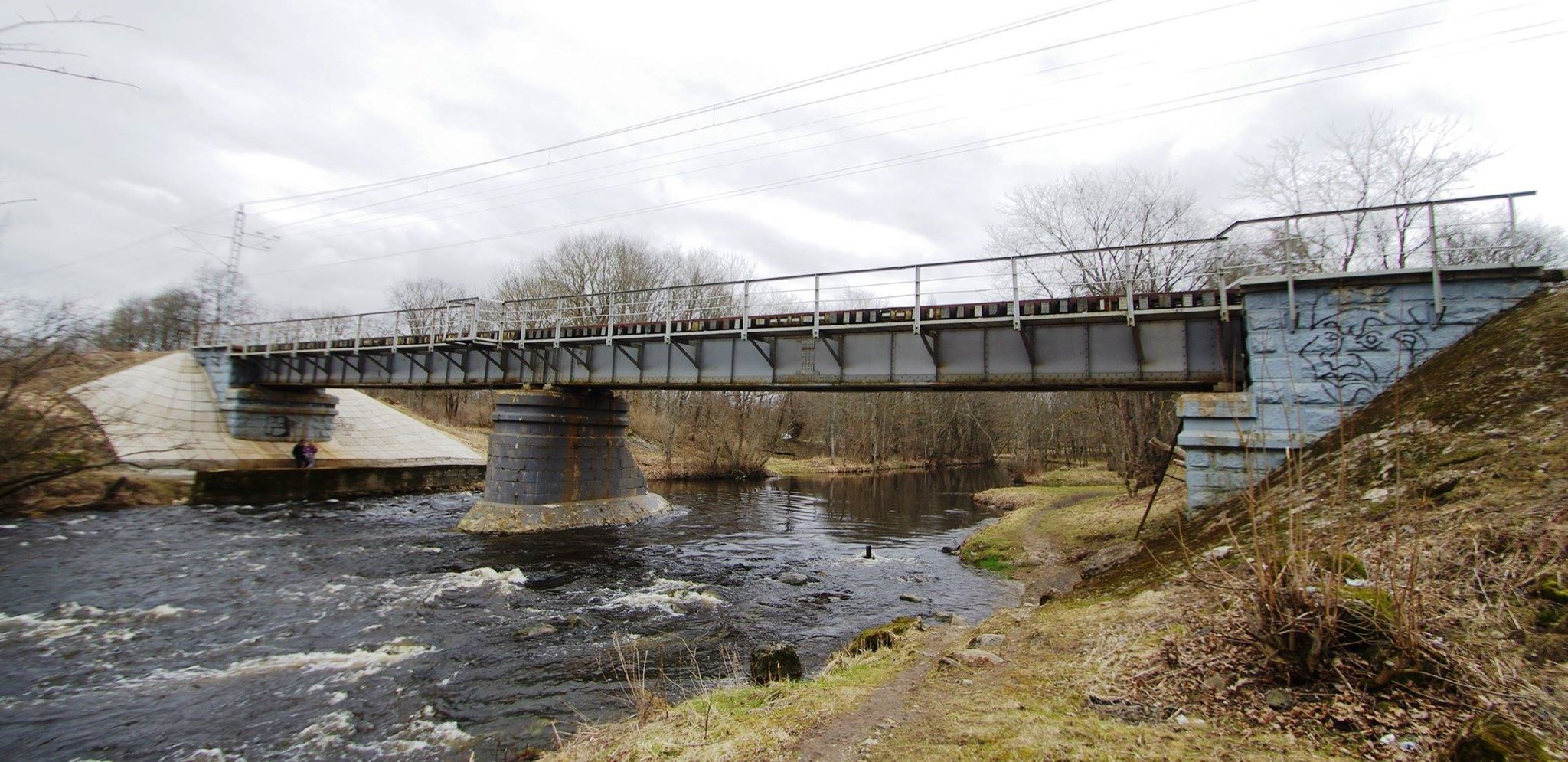

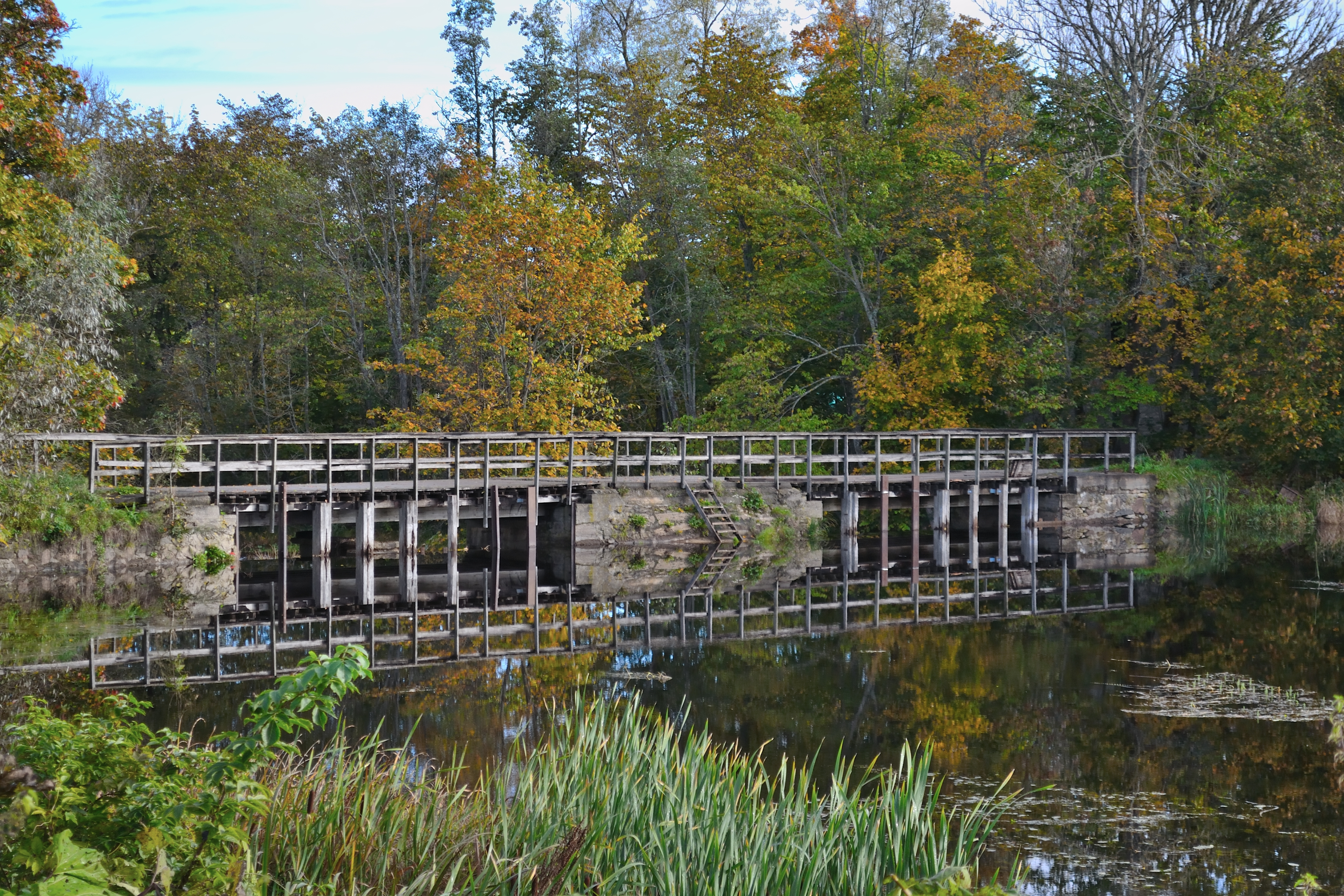

== See also ==
- Keila Falls
