= List of bays of Estonia =

This is list of bays in Estonia. The list is incomplete.

Name	Location	Further info	Image	Coordinates
Ariste Bay				
Atla Bay				
Eeslaht (Haapsalu Eeslaht)	Part of Haapsalu Bay			
Eru Bay	Part of Gulf of Finland			59°36′N 25°49′E
Gulf of Riga	Part of Baltic Sea			
Haapsalu Bay				
Hara Bay				
Hellamaa Bay				
Jausa Bay				
Kakumäe Bay	Part of Tallinn Bay			
Kasselaht				
Kasti Bay				
Kopli Bay	Part of Tallinn Bay			
Tallinn Bay	Part of Gulf of Finland			59°31′8″N 24°40′6″E
Roadstead of Tallinn	Part of Tallinn Bay			
Harju Bay	Saare County	Nowadays a lake.		
Kaugatoma Bay				
Kolga Bay				
Käsmu Bay				
Kahvatu Bay		Nowadays a lake. Its area is 5.2 ha.		
Lahepere Bay				
Linnulaht		Nowadays a lake.		
Lohusalu Bay	Harju County			
Matsalu Bay	Lääne County			
Narva Bay	Part of Gulf of Finland			
Oessaare Bay	Saare County	Now a lake, formerly a bay		
Õunaku Bay	Hiiu County	Same as Salinõmme Bay		
Paljassaare Bay	Part of Tallinn Bay			
Pärnu Bay	Part of Gulf of Riga	Its area is 411 km².		
Saastna Bay		Width of 3.8 km		
Soonlepa Bay	Hiiu County			
Suur Katel		Its area is 158 km².		
Suuremõisa Bay				
Tagalaht				
Undu Bay	Saare County			
Vaemla Bay	Hiiu County			
