= Religious views of Pyotr Ilyich Tchaikovsky =

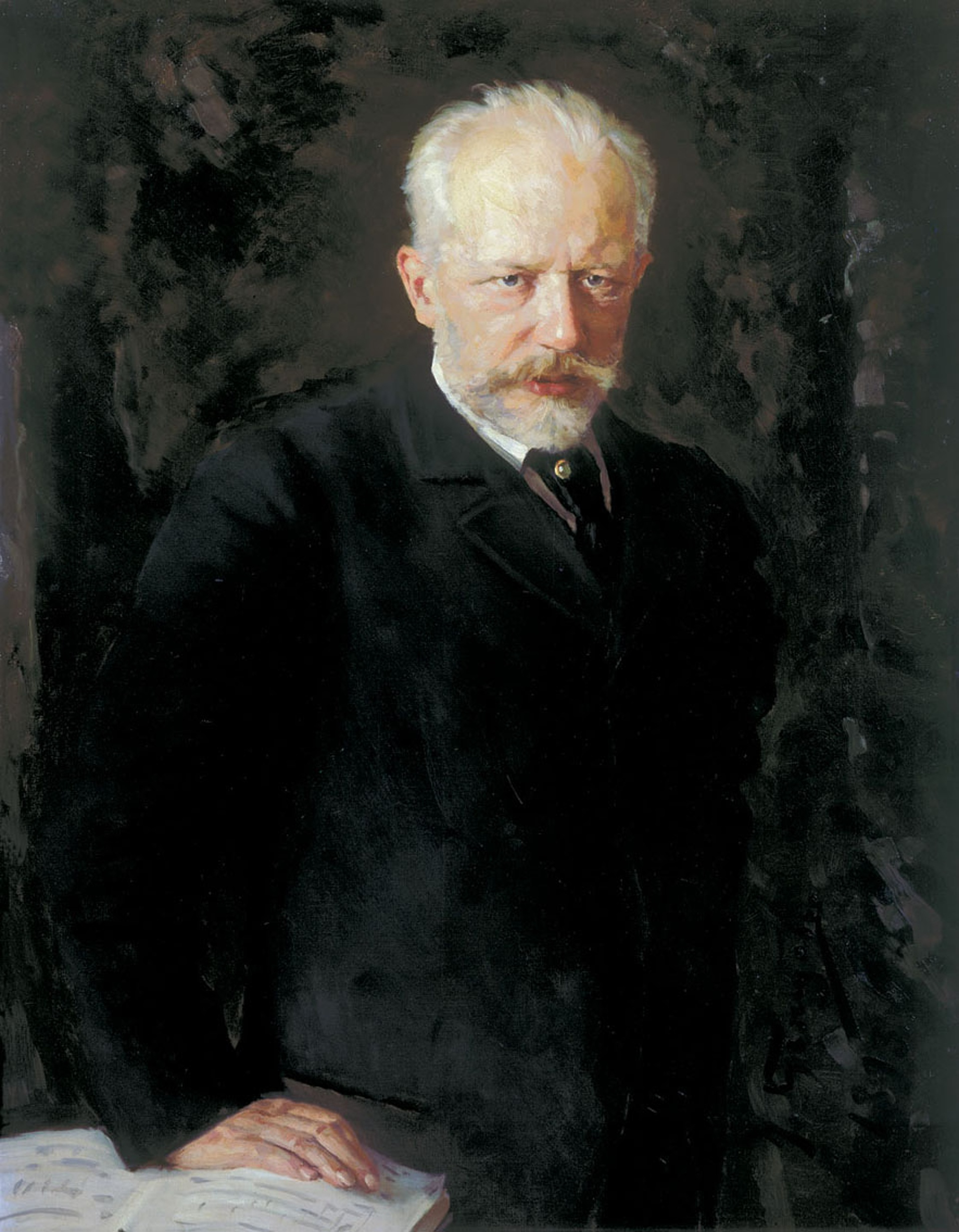
Nikolai Kuznetsov: Pyotr Ilyich Tchaikovsky (1893) State Tretyakov Gallery

The religious views of Pyotr Ilyich Tchaikovsky have been the subject of scholarly interest as a controversial topic. While Tchaikovsky's contemporaries did not place emphasis on his religious views, and during the Soviet era the composer was most often classified as a materialist, modern musicological literature has produced numerous scholarly works that, based on documentary evidence, interpret Tchaikovsky's views on religion in various ways.

The composer was raised an Orthodox Christian. Tchaikovsky's childhood poems in Russian and French were addressed to God. Doubts began to emerge after the death of his mother. By the 1860s, the composer no longer felt the need for prayer or fasting. Tchaikovsky's religious sentiments began to intensify in the mid-1870s, particularly due to his sexual orientation. By the 1880s, he found spiritual support in faith and overcame the spiritual contradictions that had troubled him. Tchaikovsky became engrossed in the "practice of religious life": he frequently discussed worship and church music, compared Orthodox services with other Christian denominations, and deeply studied Holy Scripture. Among Tchaikovsky's spiritual compositions from this period are the Liturgy of St. John Chrysostom (1878), the All-Night Vigil (1881), Nine Sacred Musical Pieces (1884–1885), and The Angel Cried Out (1887).

In his final years, Tchaikovsky focused solely on the moral aspects of Christ's teachings, unable to overcome his doubts about dogma and moved away from Orthodoxy. Tchaikovsky began to lean toward a religious position similar to that of Ernest Renan and the pantheistic views of Baruch Spinoza. In letters from his final years, Tchaikovsky mentioned his dream of composing a secular Passion of Jesus. He also made several attempts to create poetic texts based on the gospels for a future musical work.

== Evolution ==
=== Changes in views ===
Candidate of Art History Olga Zakharova described the issue of Pyotr Ilyich Tchaikovsky's religious views as "one of the most difficult and controversial topics in musicology, eliciting directly opposing interpretations", attributing this to variations in the composer's statements across different periods of his life. Candidate of Art History Antonina Makarova highlighted the evolution of Tchaikovsky's religious views throughout his life. This issue was a central focus of her dissertation, Mysterial Prototypes in the Operatic Works of P. I. Tchaikovsky, defended in Magnitogorsk in 2017. She succinctly outlined this evolution as follows: "from childhood faith in God" through "skepticism of youth", "an acute confrontation with worldview questions during the crisis years of 1877–78", to "finding a certain balance in the worldview sphere and spiritual support in faith".

=== Childhood ===
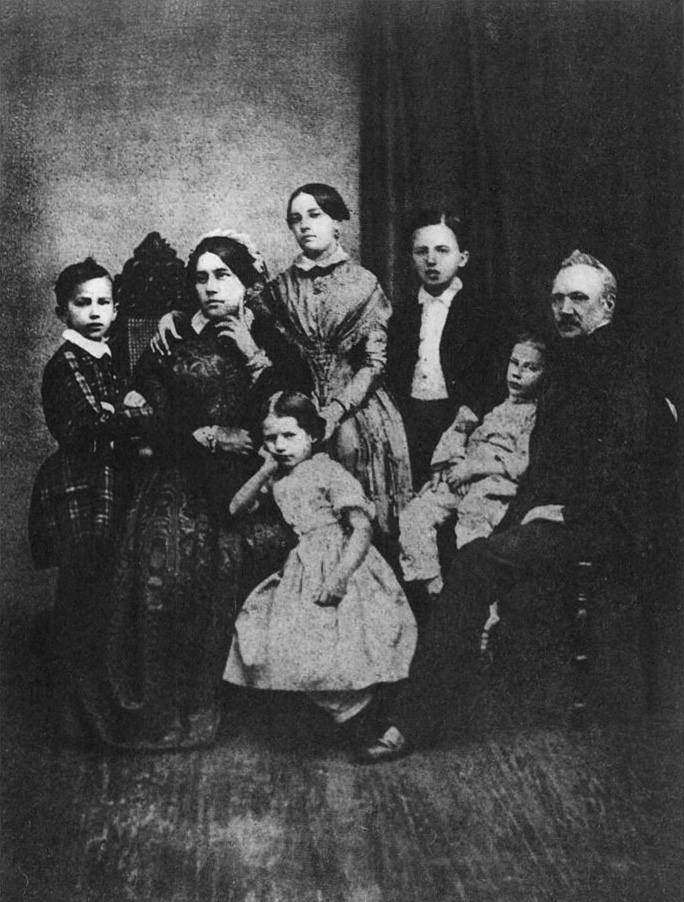
The Tchaikovsky family in 1848: Pyotr Ilyich, aged eight, is seen on the far left.

The composer's family was religious. Two revered icons from the family are preserved to this day in the Tchaikovsky House-Museum. One of them, the Virgin of Vladimir, is associated with a family legend about the miraculous recovery of Tchaikovsky's elder brother Nikolai from a severe illness. Two other family icons were in Tchaikovsky's house in Klin at the time of his death. One, Apostle Peter (made in 1841), (Note: Galina Sizko tells us in detail about this icon. It was specially ordered for either the child's first birthday or name day from an icon-painting workshop in St. Petersburg. Under the apostle's hand, a church similar to the Annunciation Cathedral in Votkinsk is depicted. Tchaikovsky was baptized there.) is located in the study-living room, and the other, the Our Lady of Kazan (by which he was blessed in childhood), (Note: The icon was painted in Vyatka in 1806. The silver frame is adorned with amethysts, beryl, carnelian, and rhinestones, and the icon itself is also decorated with these stones. It belonged to the composer's godmother and either came into his possession after her death or as a gift during her lifetime.) is in the bedroom. Tchaikovsky carefully preserved his mother's Psalter and a collection of stichera and canons, which bear inscriptions in her handwriting.

The composer was raised as an Orthodox Christian. (Note: Galina Sizko describes this in detail in her book. Valery Sokolov, a contemporary Russian biographer of Tchaikovsky, devoted a separate article to the composer's clergy ancestors.) Several generations of his ancestors were clergy. His godfather, who also taught Catechism and Russian, was archpriest Vasily Blinov of the Kamsko-Votkinsk Annunciation Cathedral. Tchaikovsky's childhood poems in Russian and French were addressed to God. He admired the omnipotence of the Almighty, who created "a beautiful world, Russia, and the Russian people". Worship was perceived as a natural and integral part of his life: "When I was a boy ... for several years I sang the first voice in a trio that, during episcopal services, is sung by three boys in the altar at the beginning and end of the service. The Liturgy, especially during episcopal services, made a profound poetic impression on me...How proud I was then to participate in the service with my singing!"

Some of the composer's childhood literary works have survived, imbued with religious and mystical experiences. Tchaikovsky's first biographer, his brother Modest, when publishing these poems in his own Russian translation, noted that "all these works are completely talentless". Candidate of Art History Georgy Kovalevsky called this judgment overly categorical and traced the influence of Psalm 103 in Tchaikovsky's poems.

"O eternal God of ours! You have done all this,

Child! Look at these beautiful plants.

These roses and veronicas are so beautiful.

The brilliant sun illuminates the whole world.

It created all of this.

The moon and stars light up our nights.

Without Thee, bread could not grow.

The waves of these beautiful waters...

We would die without them.

The seas whose pull is so great.

The rivers that surround them.

Mother, nourish! Nourish your children.

God created them.

Mighty God, Thee are so worshiped!

Modest Tchaikovsky recounted in the first volume of P. I. Tchaikovsky's Life that in the composer's childhood notebooks, letters, and drawings, "the word God appears most frequently, sometimes plainly, sometimes in a vignette". Refuting the idea that this was merely a child's calligraphy exercise, Modest cited his brother's poems addressed to God. One poem begins with an invocation for God to always protect Russia.

"Lord! Be with our beloved Russia always.

We will never forget you, and we will always believe in the Trinity.

God be with us. You are God.

You are God, and you will always be our God.

You gave us intelligence and everything we need.

So, Lord, to all Russians..."

Doctor of Art History Galina Sizko noted that Tchaikovsky's love for God was intertwined with patriotism. She cited Modest Tchaikovsky's account of the composer's French governess Fanny Dürbach. Dürbach caught the young boy kissing the territory of Russia on a geographic map while spitting on other countries. When she remarked that other nations also pray to God with the Lord's Prayer, and that she herself was French, the boy replied that he had covered France with his hand. (Note: Modest Tchaikovsky entered into correspondence with his older brother's former governess and met her in person in 1894 to gather materials for a biography of Tchaikovsky. He reworked the content of the letters and the record of the conversations into material he entitled Memories of M-elle Fanny. The governess's stories are told in the third person. This material was used for the book Pyotr Ilyich Tchaikovsky's Life (according to documents kept in the archive in Klin) in 3 volumes". "Memories of M-elle Fanny" survived and was published in 1983.)

Modest Tchaikovsky attributed his brother's interest in religious matters to the influence of Fanny Dürbach. He noted that the governess was a "strict Protestant" who placed great importance on morality. Alexander Poznansky wrote of the significant influence of Protestantism and German culture in Dürbach's hometown of Montbéliard. Her godmother was the daughter of a local pastor.

=== Youth and maturity ===
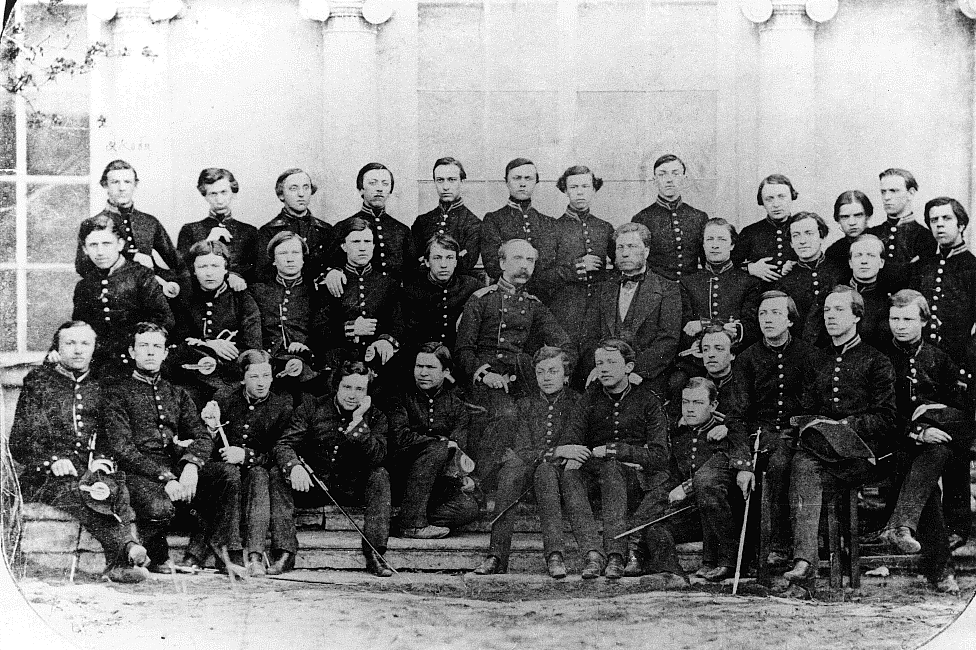
Graduating class of 1859 at the Imperial School of Jurisprudence. Tchaikovsky is seventh from the left in the first row.

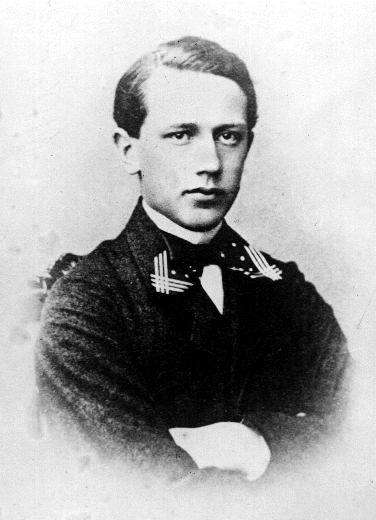
Tchaikovsky in 1860

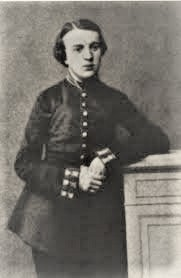
Alexei Apukhtin in the graduating class of the School (1859)

Since 1850, Tchaikovsky studied in the preparatory class of the Imperial School of Jurisprudence, and later in the school itself. The school operated under a strict barracks regime, softened only in 1856: there were solitary confinement and corporal punishment, students used to do military training, and wake up with the sound of drums. Supervisors were officers, and there was a special position of student inspector, whose duties involved "watching, catching, punishing, and flogging". But there was also bullying not only of peers and younger students but also of some teachers. Among older students, smoking, drinking (and even chronic alcoholism), and sexual relationships between students were common. Among the three subjects that the diligent Pyotr Tchaikovsky struggled with were algebra, geometry and Catechism.

A significant figure among the teachers was a religious Doctor of Theology and author of a Sacred History textbook, Mikhail Bogoslovsky. He taught a range of subjects in the lower classes (interpretation of the Old and New Testament, Catechism) and upper classes (church law, logic, and psychology). He combined refined attire with unkemptness, which even caused scandals. He condemned the fashionable disregard for church services among youths and their fascination with the theater, calling it "demonic entertainment" and dances "the devil's amusement". Nevertheless, students attended performances by French troupes at the Mikhailovsky Theatre, ballets, Italian operas, and the Alexandrinsky Theatre. Many students, including Tchaikovsky's close friends Fyodor Maslov, Alexei Apukhtin, and Vladimir Taneyev, held progressive views.

Senior researcher at the Tchaikovsky House-Museum in Klin, Doctor of Art History Galina Sizko, suggested that doubts about religion began to emerge after the death of Tchaikovsky's mother. She found evidence of this in a letter to Viktor Olkhovsky, written in 1854 (a few weeks after his mother's death) in the form of a parody of Church Slavonic. American historian Alexander Poznansky noted that the closest church to the house where Alexandra Andreevna died was the Panteleimon Church, suggesting that a priest was summoned from there for her final rites. This, he argued, explained why Tchaikovsky frequently visited this church while in St. Petersburg. Every year on his mother's birthday, the composer went to church to pray for her. However, citing psychological research, Poznansky believed that a child who loses a parent in early adolescence typically overcomes grief relatively quickly and faces no significant developmental issues thereafter.

* Pyotr Tchaikovsky. Letter to Viktor Olkhovsky (July 1854).

And during all the absence of thy fatherly time, one famous game of happiness was played. I find no words to express gratitude for your fatherly kindness, and when will you, father, deign to come to us and bring the libretto. Everything I have, I will give for it, father, and please take the trouble to write its price.

Galina Sizko wrote that Tchaikovsky's childhood religiosity had vanished by this time: religious themes disappeared from his letters, as did references to loved ones as my angels, requests for blessings, or mentions of religious holidays in the family. One rare mention of church from 1861 appears as follows: "I deliberately went to the parish church to see the impression that the manifesto had on the peasants".

In the 1860s, the composer entirely lost the need for prayer or fasting, and when he addressed religious topics in conversations, it was with irony or, as Galina Sizko described in her 2003 article, a "blasphemous" tone. In 1863, Tchaikovsky visited Optina Monastery with his friend Alexei Apukhtin, and in 1866, the Valaam Monastery, but nothing is known from the composer about the impact of these visits on his feelings or thoughts regarding religion. While at Valaam, however, Tchaikovsky and Apukhtin witnessed an event that deeply affected the composer: parents, after a year of searching, found their only son in the monastery, but despite their pleas, he refused to leave.

In her 2019 book, Galina Sizko linked the absence of immediate reactions to these monastery visits in Tchaikovsky's letters and diary to the "profound and deep impressions" they left. She cited a letter to his brother Modest, written 30 years after visiting Optina Pustyn, in which he described the "poetic impressions" from the trip. She noted that Tchaikovsky was so frightened by the sight of saints' relics in the Kyiv-Pechersk Lavra that he refused to continue the tour of the caves with his relatives.

The next stage in the development of Tchaikovsky's religious views, as described by Makarova and Sizko, was marked by "a certain frivolity combined with a degree of irony". As an example, Makarova cited Tchaikovsky's visit to the Trinity-Sergius Lavra between 1869 and 1872 with a group of friends (Rubinstein, Pyotr Jurgenson, Nikolai Kashkin, Nikolai Hubert, Ivan Klimenko). Ivan Klimenko recounted: when approaching the relics of Sergius, Tchaikovsky, to amuse his friend, whispered an impromptu: "When I saw Sergius's relics, / I dropped my earrings in the shchi." Another impromptu was whispered in the sacristy when the bishop showed them panagias: "The priest and deacon in panagias / Dance a pas naked". Klimenko noted about the trip to the lavra: "We had a very cheerful time and returned just as cheerfully".

Makarova concluded: "The composer felt neither reverence for the sacred relics nor even superstitious fear. Faith in God and all that accompanied it was of little relevance to him during those years". Galina Sizko assessed these events differently, mentioning only the composer's schoolboy antics and childish pranks. Olga Devyatova wrote that during this period, Tchaikovsky succumbed to the materialist views dominant in the 1860s–1870s and treated the Orthodox Church, its theoretical dogmas, and mandatory rituals formally.

Monasteries visited by Tchaikovsky in the 1860s through early 1870s

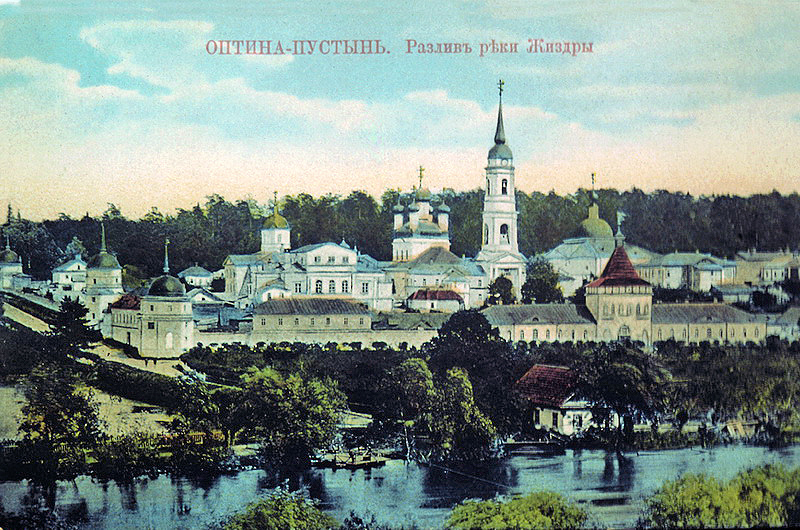
Optina Pustyn

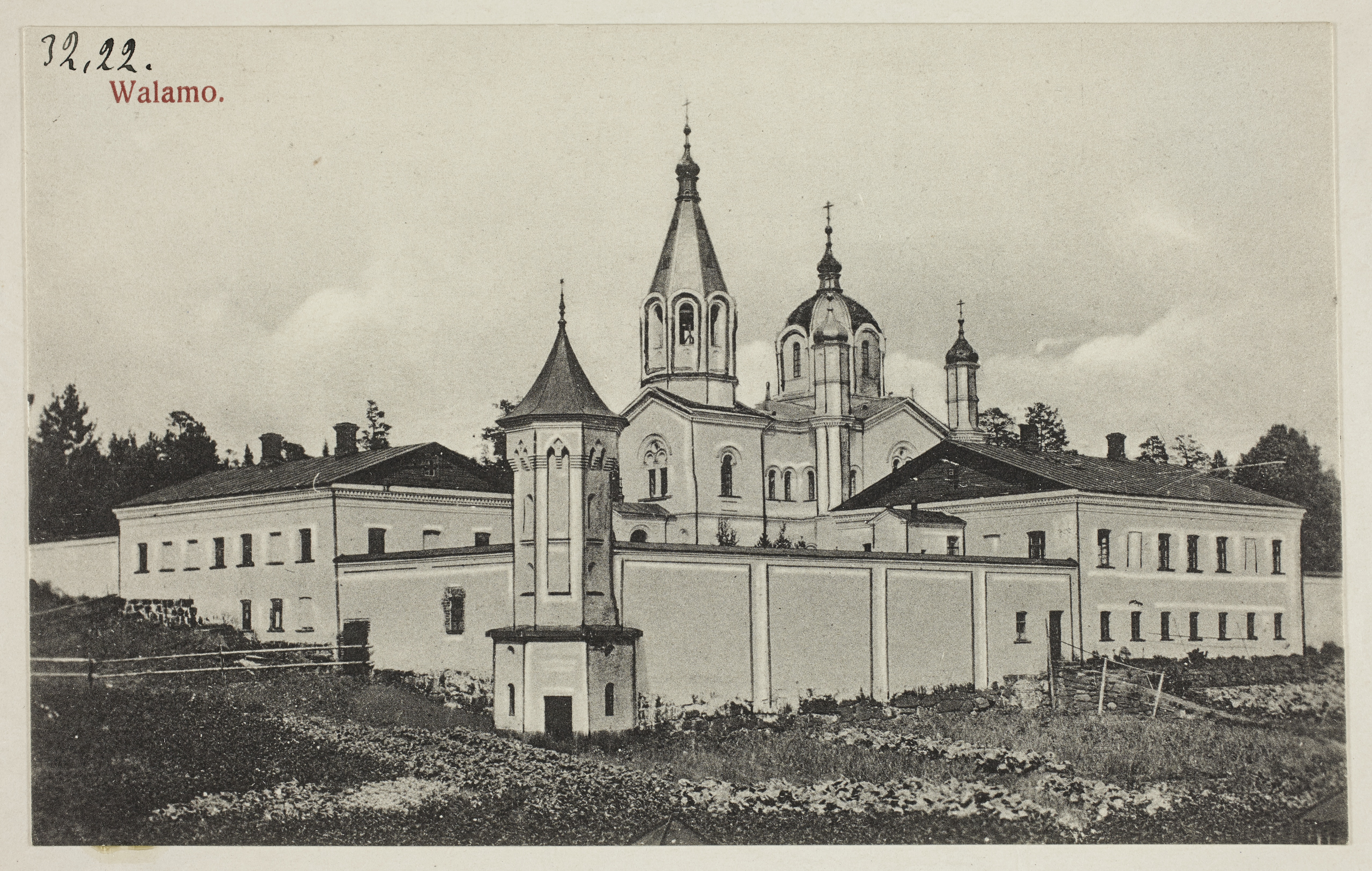
Skete of Valaam Monastery

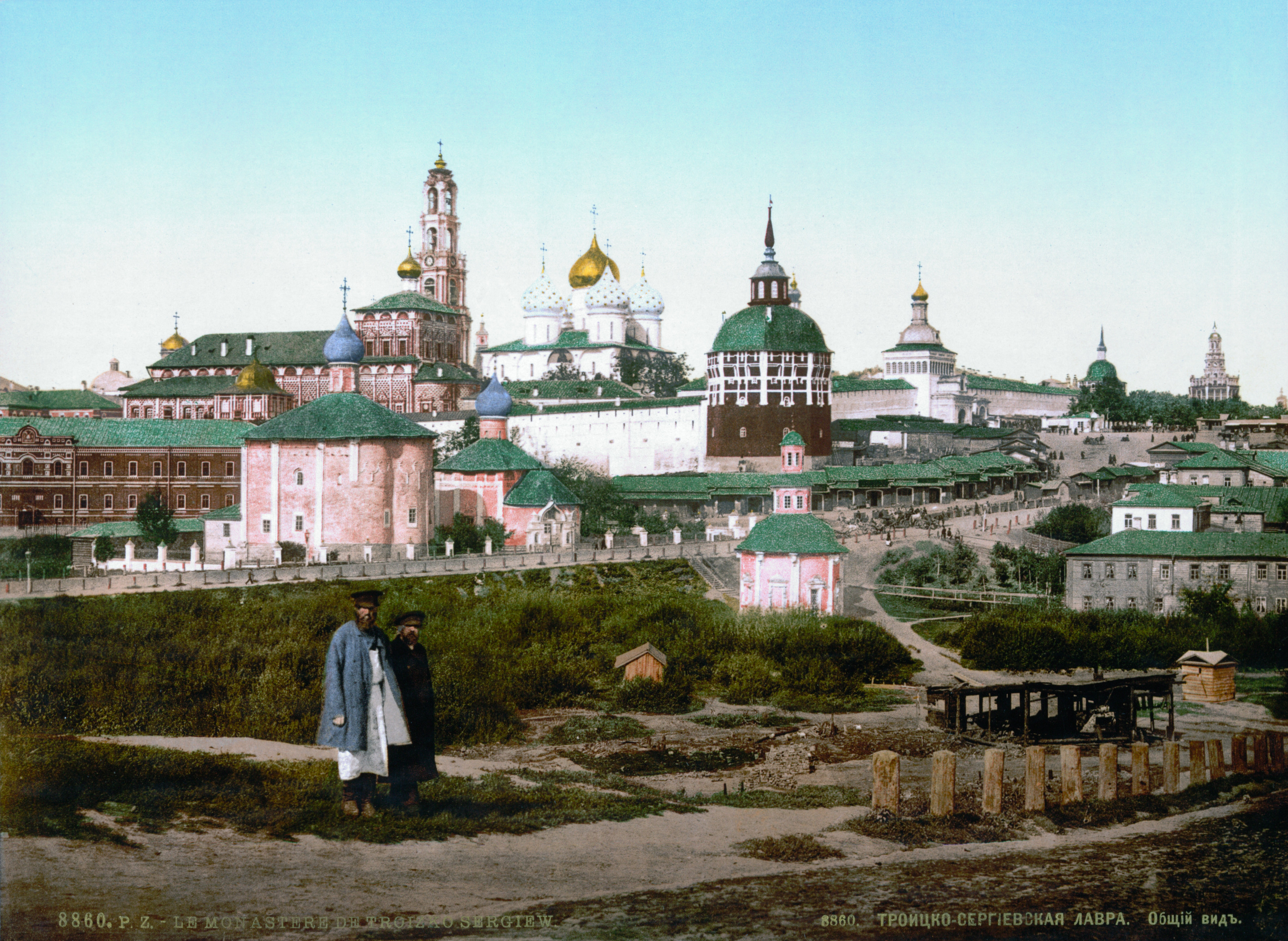
Trinity-Sergius Lavra

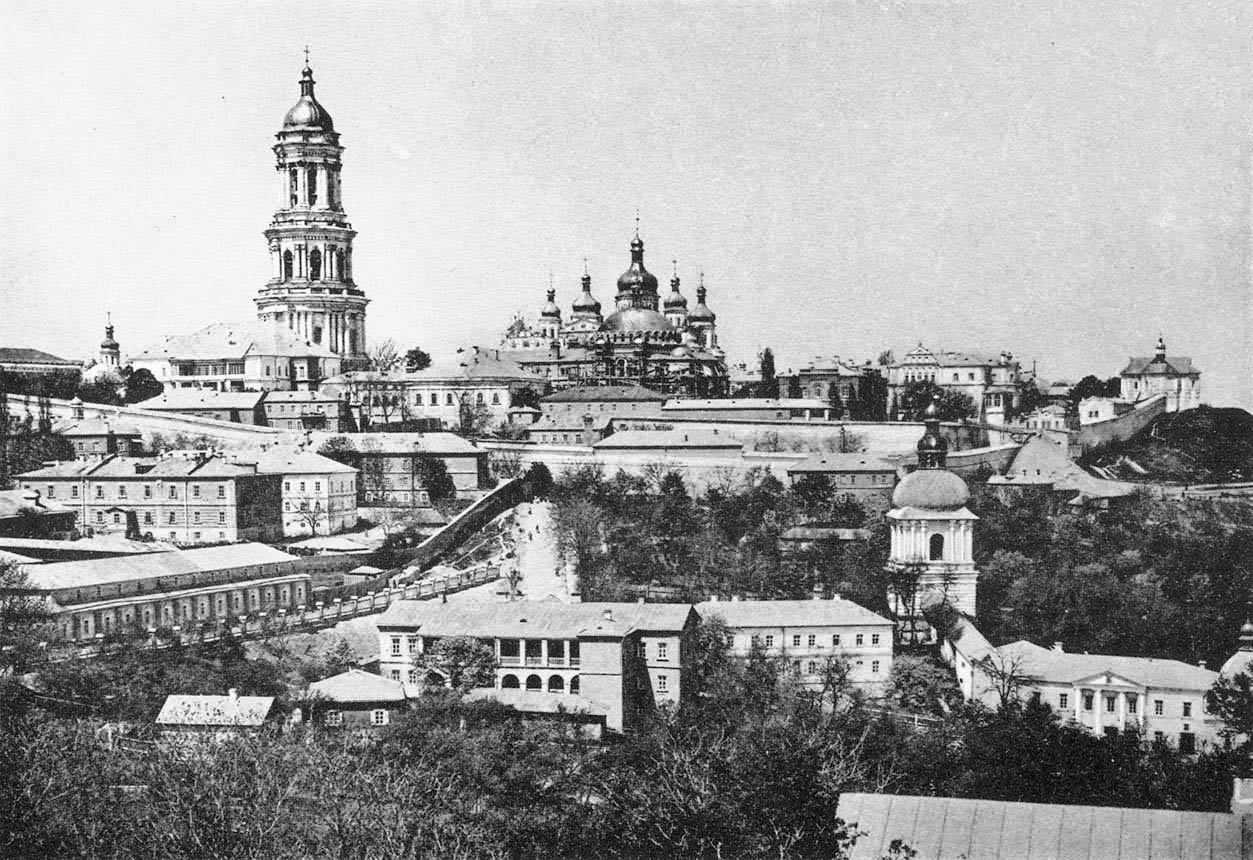
Kiev-Pechersk Lavra

=== Crisis in the mid-1870s ===
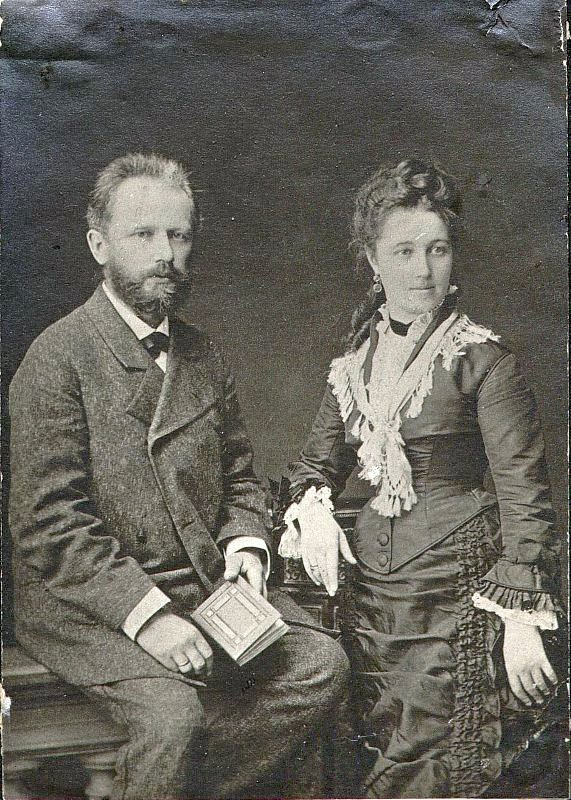
Tchaikovsky and Antonina Milyukova in July 1877

Antonina Makarova associated the next stage with the mid-1870s, linking it to the growing "moral suffering" stemming from Tchaikovsky's awareness of his sexual orientation. A pivotal event was his unsuccessful marriage. During this period, his letters mention the possibility of retreating to a monastery and attending mass at St. Isaac's Cathedral, which he connected to a "need for prayer" (this occurred in July 1877, when Tchaikovsky arrived in St. Petersburg to introduce his fiancée Antonina Milyukova to his father). Tchaikovsky frequently wrote to various correspondents about Providence, which he believed watched over him. Olga Zakharova identified multiple and varied reasons for Tchaikovsky's turn to religion. She highlighted the growing interest in religion within Russian society and two personal factors: his failed marriage and the unexpected financial support from Nadezhda von Meck, which he saw as the hand of Providence, as well as his hope that religion could help overcome his sexual inclinations, which he felt hindered his personal happiness.

Galina Sizko explained Tchaikovsky's changing attitude toward religion with two reasons:

- His creative abilities reached their peak (this period saw the creation of Eugene Onegin and the Fourth Symphony), sharply contrasting with the severe psychological crisis he was experiencing. According to Sizko, Tchaikovsky saw this as "God's benevolent providence".
- The appearance of a patron in Nadezhda von Meck. Sizko argued that Tchaikovsky interpreted this event in the spirit of folk wisdom: "God may not help directly, but He sends a person".

In a letter to Nadezhda von Meck dated October 30, 1877, Tchaikovsky wrote that his mind "stubbornly refuses to accept the truth of the dogmatic aspects of Orthodoxy and all other Christian denominations". He rejected the justice of God's judgment and admitted to a lack of belief in afterlife, as he was "completely captivated by a pantheistic view of the future life and immortality". Yet, in the same letter, he wrote of "childhood habits and poetic notions about everything related to Christ and His teachings", which compelled him to "involuntarily turn to Him in prayer during sorrow and with gratitude in happiness". Makarova argued that Tchaikovsky's religious views at this time were "at the intersection of traditional Orthodoxy and pantheistic notions of the unity of God and nature, akin to the philosophical concepts of Spinoza". He sought to compensate for religious contradictions with philosophical ideas. Olga Zakharova characterized this period as one of "religious sentiments" and "seeking reconciliation [with God]". Tchaikovsky's contemporary Dmitry Kaigorodov dedicated a short book to analyzing Tchaikovsky's texts about nature (especially Russian nature) but found no hint of the composer's pantheism.

However, when confronted with attempts by someone close to him, such as Nadezhda von Meck, to construct an independent worldview system entirely devoid of religious faith, Tchaikovsky adopted a far more traditional religious stance. In a letter to von Meck responding to her radical views on religion, he wrote that he retained poetic impressions of the church from childhood, frequently attended mass, and loved the All-Night Vigil. He stated that his reason told him there was no afterlife, but his "feeling and instinct" demanded its acknowledgment.

Makarova noted that Tchaikovsky was aware of his lack of a fully formed stance on religion. She argued that "the emotional upheavals and the acquisition of conscious religiosity in 1878 served as an impetus for the mysterial interpretation of the plot of The Maid of Orleans. Olga Devyatova described Tchaikovsky's views on religion during this period: "Tchaikovsky is a typical romantic: searching, doubting, perpetually dissatisfied, understanding the possibility of a materialist worldview with his reason, but not abandoning idealistic views, faith in God, in humanity's divine purpose, and other idealistic ideas in his eternal search".

Galina Sizko characterized Tchaikovsky's religious views at this time as contradictory, belonging to a person "who respects believers, loves the church, yet is full of doubts and does not unequivocally count himself among the faithful". For her, this period in the composer's life was a time of "returning to thoughts of faith and God". Soviet musicologist Andrey Budyakovsky noted that in 1880, despite having no interest in the works of French playwright Pierre Corneille or his contemporaries, Tchaikovsky admired his tragedy Polyeucte, "which celebrates duty, devotion to the monarchy and the church", particularly the "experiences and transformations" of the character Felix, who becomes a Christian in the final act. Even the Children's Album (1878), intended for a young audience and depicting the world of children's games, opens and closes with two pieces of an elevated and solemn character — Morning Prayer (No. 1) and In Church (No. 24).

Doctor of Art History and senior researcher at the Russian Institute of Art History, Arkady Klimovitsky, wrote in his article Tchaikovsky and the Silver Age, that in 1879, Tchaikovsky became fascinated with the works of Russian religious philosopher Vladimir Solovyov and the jurist and historian Boris Chicherin, who shared similar religious views. In a letter to Nadezhda von Meck on October 12, 1879, Tchaikovsky, influenced by Solovyov's Critique of Abstract Principles, wrote with admiration: "Matter has no objective existence and is merely a phenomenon, i.e., the result of the action of our senses and mind. What truly exists is only our cognitive faculty, i.e., reason".

The researcher argued that the influence of symbolism, characteristic of the Silver Age, can be found in Tchaikovsky's opera Iolanta and ballet The Nutcracker. Both works are marked by a particular spirituality, sublimity, and a certain ambiguity. They include scenes without external action, focusing on "previously unnoticed details of the emotional sphere and psychology of the characters". Klimovitsky characterized these works as religious-pantheistic utopias.

=== Last decade ===
Antonina Makarova associated the next stage of Tchaikovsky's religious views with the 1880s. During this period, he found spiritual support in faith and overcame the spiritual contradictions that had troubled him. Tchaikovsky became engrossed in the 'practice of religious life": he frequently discussed worship and church music, comparing Orthodox services with other Christian denominations. In a letter to von Meck, he wrote: "Hourly and minutely, I thank God for giving me faith in Him. With my faint-heartedness and tendency to fall into despair from the slightest push, what would I be without faith in God and submission to His will?" In Diary No. 3, on May 6, 1884, Tchaikovsky described his experience at a service: "I attended mass. I was very receptive to religious impressions; I stood with tears in my eyes almost the entire time. The manifestation of simple, healthy religious feeling in ordinary people (a sick old man, a 4-year-old boy approaching the chalice on his own) always touches me deeply".

In her dissertation, Makarova noted that a diary entry from September 21, 1887, reflecting on the suffering and death of his friend —Nikolai Kondratyev— reads: "How strange it was to read that 365 days ago, I was still afraid to admit that, despite the fervor of sympathetic feelings evoked by Christ, I dared to doubt His divinity". This entry leaves room for debate among researchers about Tchaikovsky's religious views in his final years. In the diary for that year, he wrote of a mystical experience that arose "suddenly and unexpectedly" in his soul (elsewhere, Makarova called it "a certain exceptional existential experience"). Tchaikovsky spoke of his own "symbol of faith" and a desire to "someday formulate it". Makarova suggested that he "possibly formulated this symbol of faith in a letter to K. R. a month before his death". She considered the most significant aspect of Tchaikovsky's religious worldview in the late 1880s–1890s to be his admiration for the "evangelical idea of divine love and mercy". She posited that the composer's "reconciliation" with God became the source of his "turn to a mysterial prototype in his final opera Iolanta.

Galina Sizko believed that the death of Tchaikovsky's senior colleague Nikolai Rubinstein in March 1881 played a significant role in his turn to religion, even shaking his previous unequivocal denial of an afterlife. Sizko linked this period to the emergence of Tchaikovsky's interest in the themes of sin and redemption. In his works, this was reflected in the prominence of flawed characters —Mazepa, Manfred, and Hermann— whom Tchaikovsky sought to justify through love.

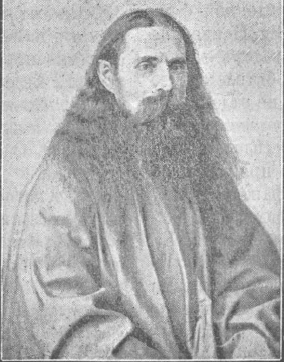
Dimitry Razumovsky, Tchaikovsky's confessor

Makarova argued that Tchaikovsky's turn to faith was not the result of reflection but of "divine revelation". Summarizing the stages of his religious development, she wrote: "Pyotr Ilyich walked his life path not without God, but with God in his soul, seeking Him, standing before Him, and experiencing His living presence in his life". In his life, he was guided by the evangelical moral ideal, and the worldview expressed in his works was "undoubtedly Christian".

Galina Sizko noted that during this period, Tchaikovsky bore the heavy burden of "misfortunes, tragic errors, and sinfulness". He keenly felt his outbursts of anger, unkind feelings during card games, and a need for repentance and redemption. He exclaimed: "Oh, what a monstrous person I am!" According to Sizko, this led to "turbulent spiritual growth" in the 1880s and early 1890s. His diaries particularly highlight Saturdays and Sundays when he attended services in the churches of Klin. Sizko noted that he visited all the city's churches: Trinity Cathedral, Znamenskaya Church in Maydanovo, Assumption Church, Joy of All Who Sorrow cemetery church. He held special reverence for the Church of the Kazan Icon of the Mother of God in the village of Klenkovo, where he always brought a gift. Sizko suggested this was linked to his special devotion to this icon. Sometimes he joined the choir, and occasionally moved between churches during a single service, as services in Klin were held at different times.

During his trip to Georgia, Tchaikovsky visited churches in Tiflis, in the Ottoman Empire he visited the Sobor of Hagia Sophia in Constantinople, and in European cities, he attended Russian churches and conversed with priests. In 1880, while in Italy, he visited St. Peter's Basilica in Rome and the Church of Santa Maria della Scala (where he attended a Catholic service). Based on an analysis of Diary No. 8, Sizko concluded that "God became the measure of all things for Tchaikovsky".

Tchaikovsky's confessor until 1889 (the year of his death) was his Conservatory colleague archpriest Dimitry Razumovsky. (Note: Razumovsky who married the composer to Antonina Milyukova in the Church of St. George on Malaya Nikitskaya Street in Moscow on July 6, 1877. Valery Sokolov tells about it in detail in his book. Subsequently, Tchaikovsky told his colleague Nikolai Kashkin that Razumovsky "freed him from some formalities and performed the sacrament of marriage with his artistic beauty".) Sizko suggested that Tchaikovsky also sought spiritual guidance from the future abbot of the Pskov-Caves Monastery, Methodius (Kholmsky). Among his frequent conversation partners in Klin was the priest Mikhail Izvekov. Locals recounted that Tchaikovsky once carried an unconscious Izvekov to his home. When the priest regained consciousness and asked where he was, Tchaikovsky replied, that he was in paradise. The surprised Izvekov responded, "And what are you doing here, Pyotr Ilyich?"

Georgy Kovalevsky noted that Tchaikovsky mentioned the popular preacher and healer John of Kronstadt only once. He cited a diary entry where John is mentioned alongside "card games and Bible reading": "At dinner, Sasha spoke about the priest Fr. Ivan, who is now performing miracles in Petersburg. A game with five players: I was no lucky at all and got terribly angry. And I've just read the First Book of Samuel".

When Tchaikovsky was dying, his brother Nikolai sent for a priest from St. Isaac's Cathedral to administer confession and communion with the Holy Gifts. The priest found Tchaikovsky unconscious and "read only the departure prayers loudly and clearly, of which, apparently, not a single word reached his [Tchaikovsky's] consciousness". After Tchaikovsky's death, numerous panikhidas were held, and on October 28, 1893, after a funeral service at Kazan Cathedral, he was buried at the Tikhvin Cemetery in Alexander Nevsky Lavra. The funeral was conducted by Bishop of Narva Nikandr, with excerpts from Tchaikovsky's Liturgy of St. John Chrysostom performed, including I Believe and We Sing to You.

=== Post-1887 ===
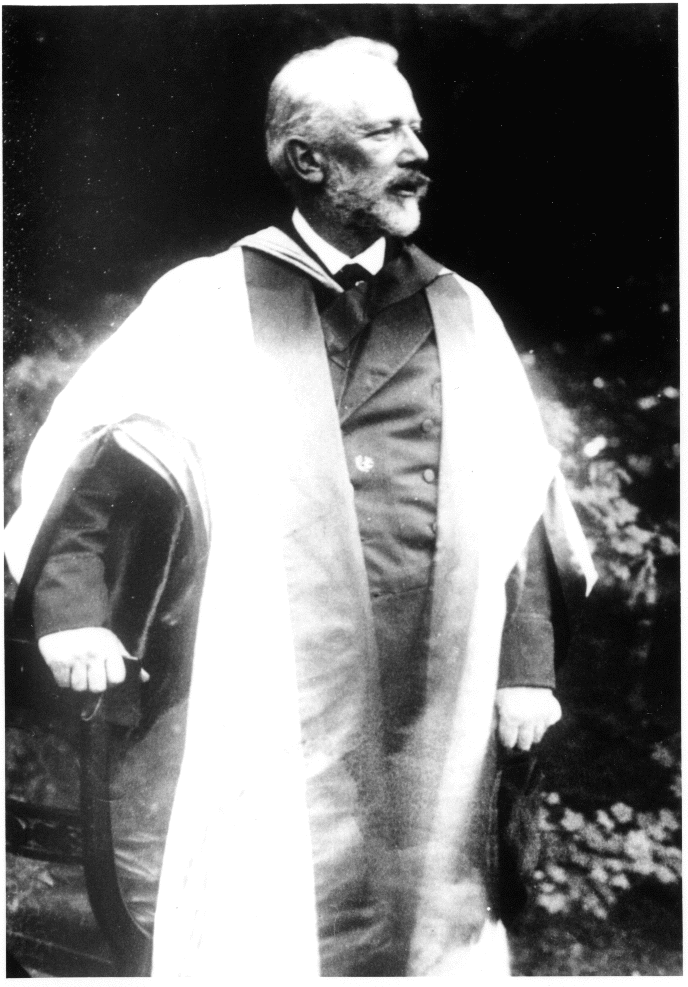
Tchaikovsky in Cambridge (13 June 1893)

According to the Candidate of Art History Olga Zakharova, only the period from 1884 to the first half of 1887 can be characterized as the orthodox. She saw evidence of this "orthodoxy" in the composer's drastic change of lifestyle and residence: he moved to Moscow Region, regularly attended church (on Saturdays, Sundays, and holidays), read the Bible in the mornings, and established a strict daily routine. In 1887, however, Zakharova identified a new turning point, linked to the prolonged and painful experience of staying by the side of his dying friend, Nikolai Kondratyev. The distinctive features of this final period, as outlined in her article, were a departure from several Orthodox traditions and the development of his own "symbol of faith". While reading Lev Tolstoy's What I Believe, Tchaikovsky highlighted passages criticizing the dogmas of resurrection and immortality, sharply criticized the dogma of retribution, and saw no purpose in prayers. Zakharova noted that this negative stance toward these dogmas is evident in Tchaikovsky's Bible annotations after 1887.

Zakharova concluded that Tchaikovsky focused solely on the moral aspects of Christ's teachings, unable to overcome his doubts about dogma and, in her words, "generally moved away from Orthodoxy". She linked this shift to his refusal to create new works for church use, which occurred in 1887. According to Zakharova, Tchaikovsky leaned toward the religious position of Ernest Renan and Baruch Spinoza, whose works he began to study diligently. She characterized this position as pantheistic but noted that, despite his efforts, Tchaikovsky could not fully formulate the symbol of faith he had hoped to articulate. Zakharova observed that Tchaikovsky agreed with Spinoza's view of the earthly origin of the ideas of goodness, evil, sin, and righteousness. She argued that, following Spinoza, he also rejected the idea of "God's incarnation".

In his final years, Tchaikovsky became engrossed in the works of French writer Gustave Flaubert. According to Zakharova, he shared Flaubert's views on the fallacy of the dogma of redemption and the inherent insolubility of the "fateful questions of existence", which traditional religions and nearly all philosophical systems attempt to answer. Zakharova noted the influence of these views on Tchaikovsky's secular works from this period. On one hand, the central theme became love and forgiveness. On the other, these works are distinctly divided into "light" ones (The Sleeping Beauty, Iolanta), with fairy-tale plots far removed from reality, embodying Tchaikovsky's striving for the Absolute, and "dark" ones (The Queen of Spades, Sixth Symphony), dominated by doubt and negation.

Zakharova's perspective is not new or original. As early as 1968, Soviet art historian Nadezhda Tumanina wrote: "By the late 1880s, faith for Tchaikovsky was not an adherence to traditional Christian religion. He had long abandoned the search for a renewal of Christian religion and embraced a religion of nature".

In contrast, Doctor of Art History Galina Sizko noted that from 1887, influenced by the deaths of Nikolai Kondratyev and his 26-year-old niece Tatyana Davydova, Tchaikovsky began his manuscripts with an invocation to God: "Lord, bless!" and concluded with gratitude: "Lord, I thank You!" (in the sketches for the Sixth Symphony), "Thanks to God!" (in the sketches for The Queen of Spades), "Glory and thanks to God!" (The Sleeping Beauty). Sizko quoted priest Mikhail Fortunato, who considered the Sixth Symphony "the composer's spiritual testament, written by a man who believed in Christ's divinity and resurrection". She shared Fortunato's view on Tchaikovsky's use of rhythmic and intonational elements of the Orthodox Trisagion in the introduction to the First Movement and the Troparion of Christ's Resurrection in the march theme of the Third Movement. Sizko wrote that in these years, "Tchaikovsky outwardly seemed to step away from Orthodoxy", but explained his interest in Spinoza and Renan as mere curiosity, as well as the impulsiveness and contradictory nature of the composer.

== Tchaikovsky's religious compositions ==
=== Tchaikovsky and the church music of his time ===
In an article by Elena Borisova and Natalia Pogorelova, it is stated that Tchaikovsky did not regularly sing in or direct a church choir during his childhood, youth, or adulthood. The only exception was his participation in performing certain church hymns as part of the choir under the direction of the prominent choral conductor Gavriil Lomakin at the Imperial School of Jurisprudence. It is known that in the lower grades, the future composer performed the trio Grant, O Lord, many years to our Master, and at age 14, he sang the trio Let my prayer arise. However, Metropolitan Hilarion (Alfeyev) concluded that "Tchaikovsky sang in the school choir for nine years". Conversely, Galina Sizko claimed that during his years at the Imperial School of Jurisprudence, Tchaikovsky "conducted" the local choir. According to her, Gavriil Lomakin allowed him to perform regent duties during episcopal services "as the most worthy". Andrei Budyakovsky believed that Tchaikovsky's work with Lomakin was not particularly significant, as Lomakin focused on the overall choir performance, paid little attention to individual musical development, and the choir's repertoire was not diverse, with Tchaikovsky likely spending little time on church services and rehearsals due to his diligent preparation for studies. Leonid Sidelnikov offered a different perspective: "It is likely in these years of singing at the school that we should seek the roots of the future composer's remarkable insight into the essence and structure of vocal performance".

Tchaikovsky's classmate Fyodor Maslov provided the most detailed account of Tchaikovsky's musical activities at the School of Jurisprudence. According to Maslov, Tchaikovsky was a regular choir singer from his first day at the institution, initially as a lead singer for the second discants and later transferred to the altos. In the fall of 1858, he was appointed regent (a role traditionally held by a student from the senior class, not a teacher), but he served only two months, replaced because he "showed neither skill nor enthusiasm for leading". While teaching at the Moscow Conservatory, Tchaikovsky wrote a Brief Textbook on Harmony, Adapted for Reading Sacred-Music Compositions in Russia for church singers.

Tchaikovsky preferred monastic services, attending those at the Assumption Cathedral in the Moscow Kremlin and the Cathedral of Christ the Saviour. He visited services at the Kyiv-Pechersk Lavra, noting their adherence to ancient national traditions—"without scores, and thus without pretensions to concert-like performance." He described such singing as "original, unique, and sometimes majestically beautiful!" However, he observed that society rejected this tradition, favoring a style rooted in European (Italian "sweet-sounding") traditions, which he found "offensive and irritating to the utmost". In 1874, Tchaikovsky joined the Society of the Ancient Russian Art Lovers, which aimed to collect and study works of ancient Russian church music.

In a letter to the Bishop of Kursk and Belgorod Mikhail (Luzin), Tchaikovsky sharply criticized contemporary compositions performed in Russian parish churches, describing his impressions from attending one such service.

The singers... gathered their strength and performed a tastelessly vulgar, inappropriately theatrical piece for the church, filled with vocal tricks, built on a foreign model, long, meaningless, and ugly. I felt a surge of indignation that grew the longer they sang. Now a bass roars with wild, bellowing solo, now a lone discant screeches, now a fragment of a phrase from some Italian trepak sounds, now an unnaturally sweet operatic love motif rings out in the crudest, flattest harmonization, now the whole choir falls silent in an exaggeratedly soft pianissimo, now it roars and screeches at full volume...

Tchaikovsky noted that the musical tradition of the Catholic Church is based on Gregorian chant, and that of the Protestant church on the chorale, making them "complete and finished". He lamented that "we have built nothing on our church melodies". He observed similarities between Gregorian chant (he acquired a collection of such chants in Paris) and ancient Russian music: "the absence of a defined, symmetrical rhythm, measure, and construction based on diatonic Greek scales". He viewed chorales as further removed from the Orthodox musical tradition. Tchaikovsky proposed applying the experience of Catholic musicians — "creators of the strict style" to Russian music.

Vladimir Morosan, founder of Archangel Voices and president of Musica Russica, and a consultant for the music department of the Orthodox Church in America, argued that Tchaikovsky's role in Russian church music cannot be overstated. Tchaikovsky was pivotal in the emergence and flourishing of the "new Russian choral school". He was the first major composer since Dmitry Bortniansky to engage with church music, corresponded with key figures like musicologist Archpriest Dimitry Razumovsky and composers Mily Balakirev and Sergei Taneyev, and composed music for two major Orthodox services—the Liturgy of St. John Chrysostom and the All-Night Vigil—establishing two stylistic directions followed by later Russian composers: free composition (in the Liturgy) and polyphonization of traditional liturgical chants (in the Vigil). His work strengthened the role of secular composers in Russian Orthodox liturgical music, but with mixed consequences: thousands of new works were created in the early 20th century, yet the liturgy became "more like a concert performance with parishioners as a passive audience", further diverging from the ancient traditions Tchaikovsky sought to restore.

=== Liturgy of St. John Chrysostom ===
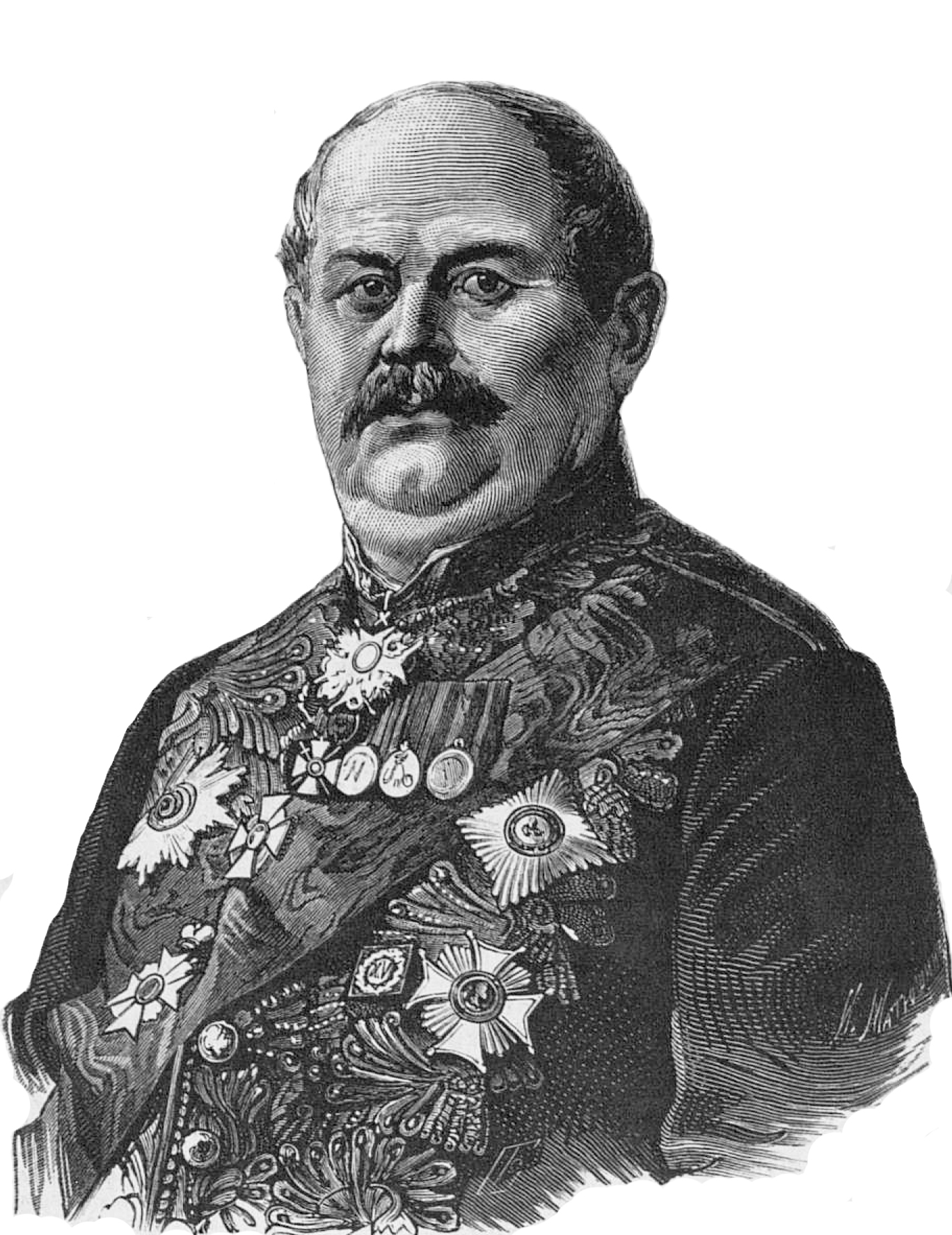
Nikolai Bakhmetev in 1876

The Liturgy of St. John Chrysostom (Note: The Liturgy of St. John Chrysostom, Op. 41, 15 numbers, autograph in the Glinka State Central Museum of Musical Culture (f. 88, No. 124), the author's 1878 arrangement for chorus and piano by Peter Jurgenson published in 1879, his original is also in the State Central Museum of Musical Culture (f. 88, No. 142).) was composed in 1878 and published by Jurgenson in January 1879. The large-scale work was written between May and July 1878. Its publication sparked a scandal, as the Saint Petersburg Imperial Chapel, led by violinist and composer Nikolai Bakhmetev, was responsible for church music standards. Bakhmetev, outraged, demanded the confiscation of printed copies and legal action against the publisher. Jurgenson took the matter to court and won, but Tchaikovsky's Liturgy was banned from church use and permitted only in concert settings until after his death. Borisova and Natalia Pogorelova, an associate professor at Kostroma State University, noted that Bakhmetev deemed the Liturgy "unsuitable and unacceptable for worship". The Bishop of Mozhaisk, temporarily managing the Moscow Diocese, Ambrose (Klyucharyov), opposed its performance in Moscow, considering it Catholic in nature, stating that "the hymns of the divine liturgy were merely material for Tchaikovsky's musical inspiration... the high dignity of the hymns and the respect of our people for them were merely an occasion for him to apply his talent".

Tchaikovsky's contemporary Antonin Preobrazhensky wrote about the Liturgy: "The Liturgy is, as one critic aptly put it, more the 'work of a conscientious artist' with an experienced hand, taste, and sense of propriety than a work of powerful inspiration (words of Herman Laroche). It would be futile to seek in this work a source of profound impact on the hearts of worshippers".

In his composition, Tchaikovsky opposed the pompous concert style and romance-like sentimentality prevalent in church music of his time, advocating a return to "ancient traditions" through the use and adaptation of ancient chants. He considered his work a transitional step toward a new Russian church music. Modern musicologists view the Liturgy as a groundbreaking work for its time, the first major Russian composer's engagement with church music since Bortniansky, and the first to compose music for an entire service, though Tchaikovsky chose a shorter version, omitting some traditional hymns. Galina Sizko noted that Tchaikovsky avoided canonical ancient melodies, relying on his experience as a parishioner and church singer.

The Liturgy's hymns are in a homophonic-harmonic style, with occasional imitative-polyphonic sections (It Is Truly Right and Praise the Lord from the heavens). Solo singing is absent, with all hymns performed by the full choir, though brief exchanges between female and male groups occur in Kyrie and the Cherubic Hymn. Intonational connections between sections lend the Liturgy unity. Borisova and Pogorelova argue that, despite Tchaikovsky's claims, the music has a personal, lyrical character.

=== All-Night Vigil ===
For the All-Night Vigil, (Note: All-Night Vigil, May 1881 - November 25, 1882, Op. 52, 17 numbers, autograph in the Glinka State Central Museum of Musical Culture (f. 88, No. 123), published first by Jurgenson in 1882, Jurgenson published the author's arrangement for chorus and piano in the same year.) Tchaikovsky requested from Jurgenson the History of Church Music by medieval music scholar and paleographer Dimitry Razumovsky and a Brief Outline of the All-Night Vigil for Laymen, doubting its existence. Georgy Kovalevsky noted the absence of patristic or theological literature in Tchaikovsky's library. Tchaikovsky also asked priest Alexander Ternavich, whose daughters he helped enroll in the Conservatory, for a list of fixed hymns for the Vigil, receiving it on June 21, 1881. The Vigil's greater variability compared to the Liturgy led Tchaikovsky to aim for a model, coherent form. He later recalled: "How I struggled and got lost in the labyrinth of our liturgical books!" and noted that those who compiled the church's service books "were quite muddled and followed no system". His student Sergei Taneyev was his most authoritative consultant.

Comparing the Vigil to the Liturgy, Tchaikovsky wrote: "I want to sober church music from excessive Europeanism, not so much theoretically but through an artist's instinct...". In a letter, he stated: "In the Liturgy, I followed my artistic impulse entirely. The Vigil, however, is an attempt to restore to our church what was forcibly taken from it... I am not an independent artist here but a transcriber of ancient chants". He sought to preserve the "national, primal structure" of liturgical music's archetype, using the style of Kyivan chant and Znamenny chant in hymns like "Gospodi, pomilui" and other short prayers.

Antonin Preobrazhensky praised the Vigil but noted three flaws: melody took second place to harmonization, the rigidity and opacity of voices, and the high vocal range. Scholars consider the Vigil a model for many Russian composers' Vigils in the 19th and early 20th centuries.

All hymns in Tchaikovsky's Vigil are harmonizations of traditional Znamenny chant, Kyivan chant, and Greek chant. Tchaikovsky gave each chant roughly equal weight, creating a complex, cohesive composition while freely interpreting ancient melodies. The work premiered in June 1882 at the Industrial Exhibition hall in Moscow but did not gain widespread popularity due to its strict style being too austere for concert halls, its score being overly demanding for church choir, "melodies overloaded with modal harmony," and harmonization reflecting Tchaikovsky's personal style rather than the intended Byzantine style.

=== Nine sacred-musical compositions ===
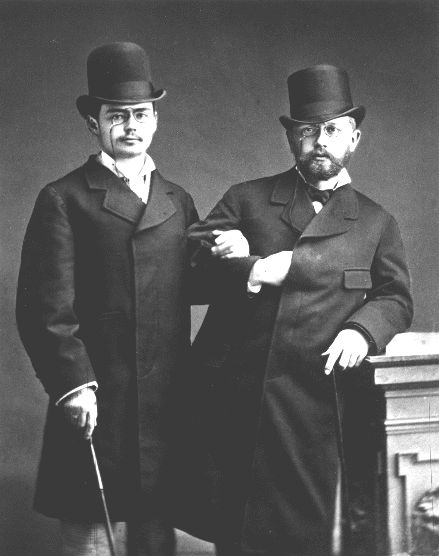
Iosif Kotek (left) and Tchaikovsky (right) in 1877

The church works composed after the Vigil were included in the collection Nine sacred-musical compositions for unaccompanied four-part mixed choir (November 1884–April 1885). Sketches are preserved in the Klin House-Museum (except Nos. 3 and 5), with the autograph in the Glinka State Central Museum of Musical Culture (f. 88, No. 125). First published by Jurgenson in 1885, with a choir and piano arrangement issued the same year. Galina Sizko linked the collection's creation to Alexander III's wish for Tchaikovsky to "compose something for the church," begun while traveling abroad to visit his dying friend and colleague, violinist Iosif Kotek.

The collection includes hymns for various services —daily, Easter Vigil, Liturgy of the Presanctified Gifts, and the All-Night Vigil— comprising three Cherubic Hymns, It Is Truly Right, To Thee We Sing, Lord's Prayer, Now the Powers of Heaven, Let My Prayer Be Set Forth, and Blessed Are They Whom Thou Hast Chosen. Tchaikovsky returned to a freer compositional style. To Thee We Sing, It Is Truly Right, and the first Cherubic Hymn were composed for the Imperial Court Chapel at Alexander III's request, characterized by pure diatonic harmony, absence of seventh chords, and canonical imitations. The second Cherubic Hymn has a minuet rhythm, styled after Bortniansky, while the third is in the style of a kant, continuing the tradition of church polyphony with third-sixth parallel voice movements. Let My Prayer Be Set Forth lacks quotations from traditional or ancient chants.

Sizko offered two explanations for the three Cherubic Hymns: they could be variants for different services, or Tchaikovsky "particularly loved the state of soul evoked by this hymn, leading to the liturgy's main part". Tchaikovsky did not explain this, prompting Sizko's comment: "sometimes he remained silent about the deepest and most cherished things".

=== Angel exclaims ===
Angel exclaims was Tchaikovsky's final sacred work, composed on February 17, 1887, at the request of Russian Choral Society choir director in Moscow Ivan Popov. Borisova and Pogorelova viewed it as the culmination of Tchaikovsky's sacred oeuvre, blending "discoveries in plagal diatonic harmonic progressions, contrasting complex polyphonic episodes with vivid multi-octave chords, and alternating expressive melodic flights with the grace of restrained choral speech". Sizko called it the finest in his sacred choral legacy. First published by Jurgenson in 1906, the original is held at the Klin House-Museum (sh. A, a1, No. 101, folder XXIX).

=== Unfinished Passion of Christ ===
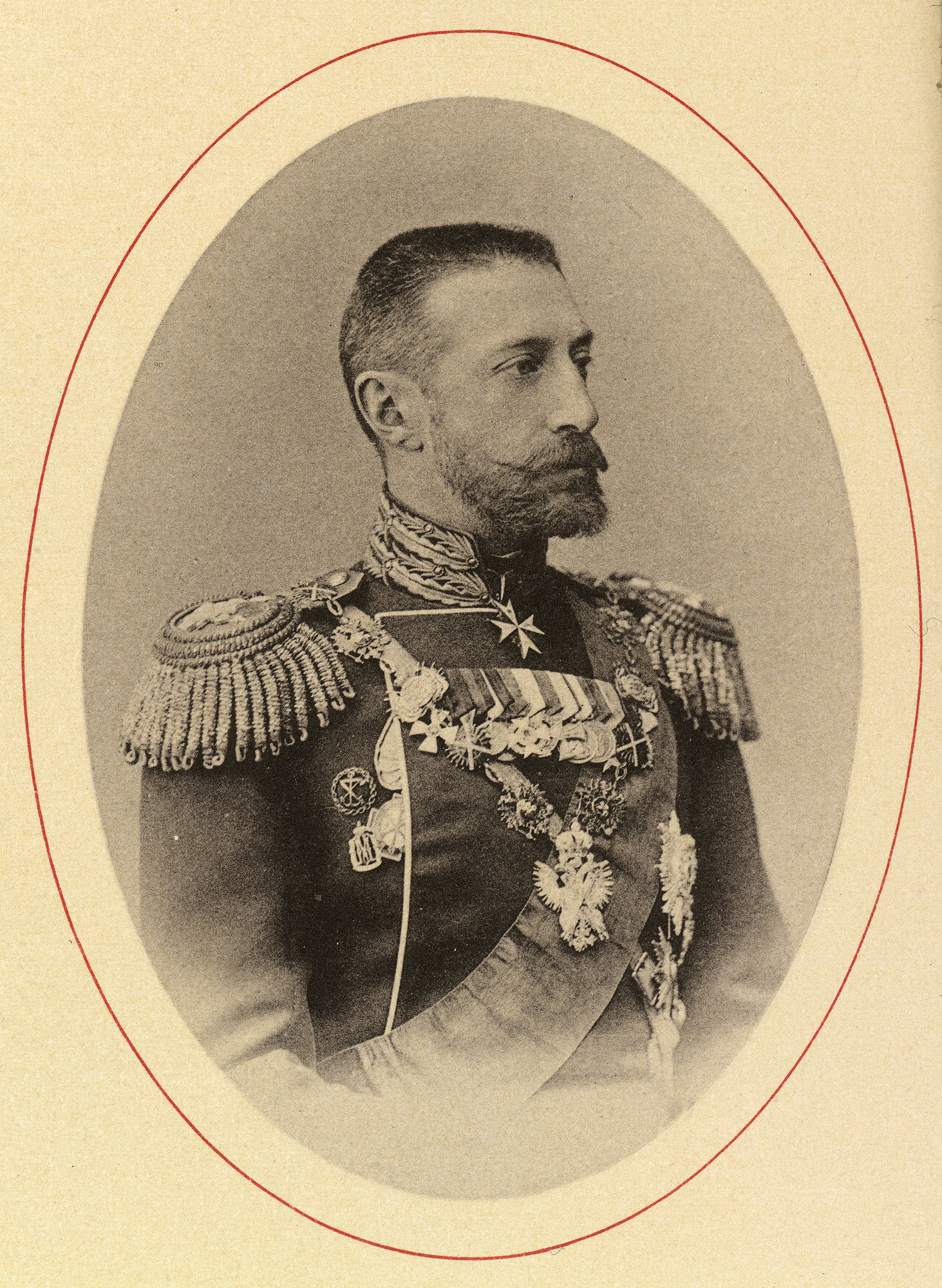
Grand Duke Konstantin Konstantinovich in general's uniform, circa 1896

In a letter to the Grand Duke Konstantin Konstantinovich on October 15, 1889, Tchaikovsky mentioned attempting to set short Gospel texts to verse, but most desired to set to music Christ's words: " Come unto Me, all ye that labor and are heavy laden". These attempts failed, and he suggested K. R. use the Passion of Christ as a subject for a major work. In another letter, Tchaikovsky declined K. R.'s request to write a Requiem for their friend Apukhtin, who died in August 1893, objecting to the Requiem's references to God as Judge and Avenger: "There is much talk of God the Judge, God the Punisher, God the Avenger. Forgive me, Your Highness, but I dare suggest that I do not believe in such a God, or at least such a God cannot inspire in me the tears, ecstasy, or reverence before the creator of all good that would move me". (Note: In the original letter there is an underlining of a text of special importance to the composer. He emphasized "God the Judge, God the Punisher, God the Avenger" and also "come to me all you who labor and are heavy laden", "for my yoke is sweet and my burden is light".) He dreamed of composing a work on "Come unto Me, all ye that labor and are heavy laden" and "For My yoke is easy and My burden is light," noting their love, compassion, and "infinite poetry".

Commenting on this unrealized project, Sizko wrote: "One can only regret that there are no Russian passions composed by Tchaikovsky". In 1912, K. R. completed, and in 1914 staged at the Hermitage Theatre, the verse drama King of the Jews.

== Historiography ==
=== Pre-revolutionary musicology and memoirs ===
Tchaikovsky's religious views are briefly mentioned in memoirs by friends like Nikolai Kashkin, Herman Laroche, Ivan Klimenko, and his brother Modest, without a comprehensive analysis. His correspondence with Nadezhda von Meck is a key source for studying his religious outlook. Dmitry Kaigorodov, in a 1907 lecture, touched on Tchaikovsky's views on nature and religion based on Modest's biography. Antonin Preobrazhensky analyzed Tchaikovsky's church compositions within the Russian Orthodox tradition.

=== Soviet period ===
Soviet musicology reframed Tchaikovsky's image, shifting from "Orthodoxy, autocracy, nationality" to "statehood, nationality, realism, optimism", creating a Soviet myth while retaining pre-revolutionary views. Igor Glebov noted Tchaikovsky's complex relationship with religion, describing his church scores as infused with "pompous uplift" and apparent religious zeal. Andrei Budyakovsky highlighted Tchaikovsky's spiritual oscillations, noting his detachment from Orthodox doctrine and inclination toward pantheism, influenced by Rousseau, Flaubert, and Spinoza. Yuly Kremlev argued Tchaikovsky sought to express human passions without divine reliance. Arnold Alshvang described Tchaikovsky's skepticism toward Tolstoy's religious views and temporary turn to religion in the 1880s, reflected in the opera The Maid of Orleans. Mikhail Blok emphasized Tchaikovsky's materialist convictions, tempered by lingering religious sentiments from childhood. Iosif Kunin saw religious feelings as a temporary refuge during crises, with Tchaikovsky ultimately rejecting a personal God for a unique, undefined belief system. Alexander Dolzhansky noted Tchaikovsky's inconsistent relationship with religion, drawn to church music's aesthetics but alienated from its dogma. Nadezhda Tumanina viewed Tchaikovsky as a humanist with materialist leanings, valuing the poetic beauty of Orthodox rituals but not their doctrine.

=== Contemporary Russian musicology ===
Aida Ainbinder noted a new mythologization of Tchaikovsky as a neurotic, with modern musicology aiming to rediscover the "real" composer. Leonid Sidelnikov downplayed Tchaikovsky's religiosity, emphasizing his humanistic view of faith. Olga Zakharova analyzed Tchaikovsky's Bible annotations, revealing systematic reading from 1885 to 1892, with a peak in 1886. Metropolitan Hilarion (2016) portrayed Tchaikovsky as deeply religious and church-oriented. Georgy Kovalevsky examined Tchaikovsky's 1882 letter to Bishop Mikhail, critiquing the Church's neglect of musical aesthetics. Olga Devyatova compared Tchaikovsky's and Tolstoy's spiritual quests, noting their shared focus on faith as essential to human existence. Antonina Makarova linked Tchaikovsky's religious views to his "mystery" operas The Maid of Orleans and Iolanta. Elena Kitaeva contextualized Tchaikovsky's faith within the 19th-century Russian religious crisis, reflected in operas like Mazeppa, The Enchantress, and The Tsarina's Slippers. Galina Sizko's works, including her book Tchaikovsky's Spiritual Path (2019), explore his Orthodox connections.

=== Foreign historiography ===
Galina Poberezhnaia explored potential Masonic influences on Tchaikovsky, noting connections via his grandfather and Nadezhda von Meck, but found no evidence of active involvement. David Brown argued Tchaikovsky moved beyond traditional Orthodoxy, drawn to its rituals as part of Russian culture. Roland John Wiley highlighted Tchaikovsky's childhood religious writings and later Bible reading, linking his philanthropy to Christian charity. Olga Dolskaya emphasized the subtle influence of Orthodox music on Tchaikovsky's orchestral works, like the Symphony No. 2 and Symphony No. 6. Alexander Poznansky argued Tchaikovsky did not view his homosexuality as a religious sin, dismissing suicide as incompatible with his faith. Marina Ritzarev interpreted the Symphony No. 6 as reflecting Christ's story, connecting its themes to Passion narratives.

== In culture ==
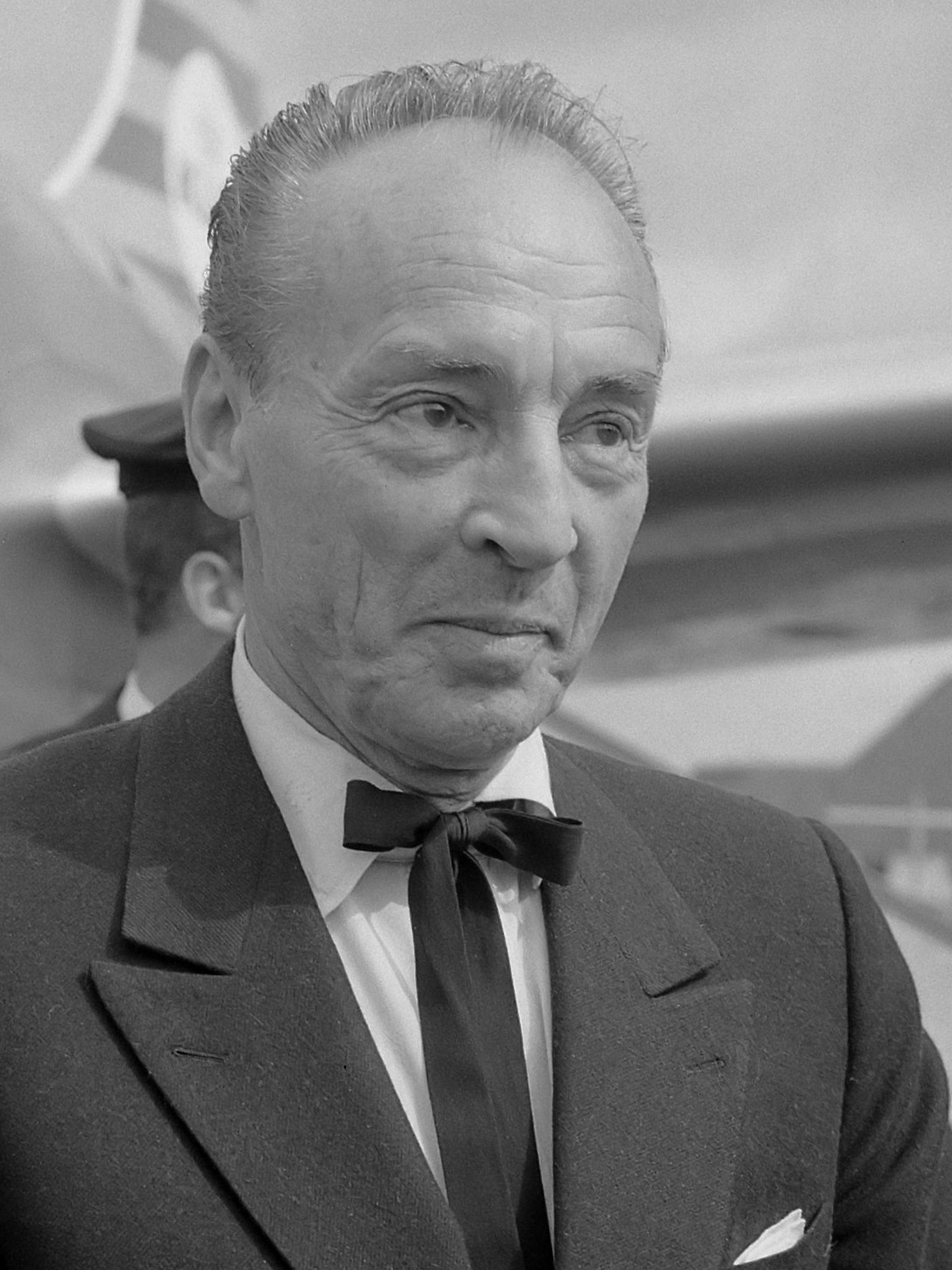
George Balanchine in 1965

Literary scholar Solomon Volkov in his book Passions for Tchaikovsky: Conversations with George Balanchine cites the choreographer's views on Tchaikovsky's religiosity. Balanchine, himself religious, considered Tchaikovsky a believer. Regarding the composer's death, Balanchine proposed a hypothesis of "russian roulette": "Tchaikovsky may have deliberately drunk unboiled water during a cholera epidemic". He sought death but left the final choice to fate, avoiding conflict with his religious convictions. Balanchine admitted he did not appreciate Tchaikovsky's church music, believing it better suited for an Orthodox church than a concert hall.

In 1990, a journalistic book by Boris Nikitin, a shipbuilding engineer by training who devoted much of his life to studying Russian musicians' biographies, titled Tchaikovsky: Old and New, was published. Analyzing the evolution of Tchaikovsky's religious views, Nikitin argued that, after briefly turning from Christianity to pantheism, Tchaikovsky returned to purely Christian beliefs, remaining faithful to them until the end of his life, though he placed little importance on church dogmas. Examining Tchaikovsky's correspondence with Nadezhda von Meck, Nikitin noted that the composer long avoided responding to her religious-philosophical musings. He promised to elaborate on his own beliefs but did so only six months later, without referencing her letter.

The sacred hymn Blessed Joseph attributed to Tchaikovsky in the film, serves as the plot catalyst for the movie Apocrypha: Music for Peter and Paul by Russian director Adel Al-Khadad, filmed in 2004. In the plot, Tchaikovsky, returning from Vienna in 1878, visits his sister Alexandra Davydova at her husband's estate in Kamenka. The local church is set to premiere his new composition Blessed Joseph. Family and villagers eagerly await the performance, but it unexpectedly fails. Screenwriter Yuri Arabov significantly altered a real episode from Tchaikovsky's life (detailed by American researcher David Brown), which Tchaikovsky himself described in a letter to Nadezhda von Meck. In reality, Blessed Joseph was not Tchaikovsky's work but a troparion arranged by Bortniansky, which Tchaikovsky performed as a church regent. The failed performance was not a tragedy for him, and the event occurred not in 1878 but on April 18, 1880.

== Bibliography ==
=== Sources ===
- Klimenko, I. A. (1908). "Part 1". Мои воспоминания о Петре Ильиче Чайковском [My memories about Pyotr Ilyich Tchaikovsky] (in Russian). Рязань: Типография Н. В. Любомудрова. p. 83.
- Maslov, F. I. (1979). "Воспоминания друга". Воспоминания о П. И. Чайковском [Memories of P. I. Tchaikovsky] (in Russian). М.: Музыка. pp. 33–35.
- Tchaikovsky, M. I. (1983). "Воспоминания M-elle Fanny". П. И. Чайковский. Годы детства. Материалы к биографии [P. I. Tchaikovsky. Years of childhood. Materials for biography] (in Russian). Ижевск: «Удмуртия». pp. 91–97.
- Tchaikovsky, M. I. (1997). Жизнь Петра Ильича Чайковского (по документам, хранившимся в архиве в Клину) в 3-х томах [Pyotr Ilyich Tchaikovsky's life (based on documents kept in the archive in Klin) in 3 volumes]. Гений в искусстве (in Russian). Vol. 1. 1840—1877. М.: Алгоритм. p. 511. ISBN 5-88878-007-3.
- Tchaikovsky, P. I. (1923). "Дневник № 3". Дневники П. И. Чайковского (1873—1891) [P. I. Tchaikovsky's diaries (1873–1891)] (in Russian). М.—Пг.: Государственное издательство. Музыкальный сектор. pp. 17–27.
- Tchaikovsky, P. I. (1981). Письмо к великому князю Константину Константиновичу (26 сентября 1893 года) // Полное собрание сочинений [Letter to Grand Duke Konstantin Konstantinovich (September 26, 1893) // Full Collection of Works]. Литературные произведения и переписка (in Russian). Vol. XVII: Письма (1893). М.: Музыка. pp. 193–194.
- Tchaikovsky, P. I. (1959). "Письмо к Виктору Ольховскому (июль 1954 года)". Полное собрание сочинений [Complete Works]. Литературные произведения и переписка (in Russian). Vol. V: Письма (1848—1875). М.: Музыка. p. 54.
- Tchaikovsky, P. I. (1966). "Письмо к епископу Курскому и Белгородскому Михаилу (Лузину) от 29 сентября 1882 года". Полное собрание сочинений [Complete Works]. Литературные произведения и переписка (in Russian). Vol. XI: Письма (1882). М.: Музыка. pp. 232–235.
- Tchaikovsky, P. I. (1965). "Письмо к Надежде фон Мекк от 18 апреля 1880 года". Полное собрание сочинений [Complete work]. Литературные произведения и переписка (in Russian). Vol. IX: Письма (1880). М.: Музыка. pp. 109–110.
- Tchaikovsky, P. I. (1961). "Письмо к Модесту Чайковскому (10 сентября 1876 года), Письмо к Надежде фон Мекк (30 октября 1877 года)". Полное собрание сочинений [Complete Work]. Литературные произведения и переписка (in Russian). Vol. VI: Письма (1876—1877). М.: Музыка. pp. 69, 212–214.
- Tchaikovsky, P. I. (1963). "Письмо к Надежде фон Мекк (12 октября 1879 года)". Полное собрание сочинений [Complete work]. Литературные произведения и переписка (in Russian). Vol. VIII: Письма (1879). М.: Музыка. pp. 389–391.

=== Researches and non-fiction ===
- Ainbinder, A. D. (2010). Личная библиотека П. И. Чайковского как источник изучения его творческой биографии. Автореферат диссертации на соискание учёной степени кандидата искусствоведения [Personal library of P. I. Tchaikovsky as a source of study of his creative biography. Abstract of the dissertation for the degree of Candidate of Art History] (PDF) (in Russian). М.: Российская академия музыки имени Гнесиных. p. 26.
- Ainbinder, A. D. (2020). Чайковский — наше всё? [Tchaikovsky: is he our everything?] (in Russian). М.: Композитор.
- Alshvang, А. А. (1970). П. И. Чайковский [P. I. Tchaikovsky]. Классики мировой музыкальной культуры (in Russian). М.: Музыка. p. 801.
- Anshakov B. Ya., Vaidman P. E. (1983). "Материалы к биографии П. И. Чайковского. 1840—1852". П. И. Чайковский. Годы детства. Материалы к биографии [P. I. Tchaikovsky. Years of childhood. Materials for biography] (in Russian). Ижевск: «Удмуртия». pp. 3–12.
- Borisova E. Yu., Pogorelova N. Yu. (2010). П. И. Чайковский как основоположник новой Московской школы церковной музыки [P. I. Tchaikovsky as the founder of the new Moscow school of church music] (in Russian). Кострома: Костромской государственный университет имени Н. А. Некрасова. pp. 73–77.
- Block, M. S. (1955). "Неизданные пометы П. И. Чайковского на публицистическом произведении Л. Н. Толстого". Яснополянский сборник: литературно-критические статьи и материалы о жизни и творчестве Л. Н. Толстого: Сборник статей [Yasnopolyanskii sbornik: literary-critical articles and materials on the life and work of L. N. Tolstoy: Collection of articles] (in Russian). Тула: Тульское книжное издательство. pp. 214–225.
- Budyakovsky, A. E. (2003). Жизнь Петра Ильича Чайковского [Pyotr Ilyich Tchaikovsky's life] (in Russian). СПб.: КультИнформПресс. p. 351. ISBN 5-8392-0229-0.
- Budyakovsky, A. E. (2008). "4. О романтизме и реализме". О творчестве и музыкально-эстетических воззрениях П. И. Чайковского [On the creative work and musical and aesthetic views of P. I. Tchaikovsky] (in Russian). СПб.: КультИнформПресс. pp. 89–106. ISBN 978-5-8392-0291-7.
- Glebov, I. (1922). Чайковский. Опыт характеристики [Tchaikovsky. Experience of characterization] (in Russian). Пг.: Светозар. p. 62.
- Devyatova, O. L. (2017). "«Исповедь» Л. Н. Толстого и культурфилософские воззрения П. И. Чайковского". Известия Уральского федерального университета. 1. Проблемы образования, науки и культуры: Журнал. Vol. 23. Екатеринбург: Уральский федеральный университет имени первого Президента России Б. Н. Ельцина. pp. 119–129. ISSN 2227-2275.
- Dolzhansky, A. N. (1981). "О Музыке Чайковского". Симфоническая музыка Чайковского. Избранные произведения [Symphonic music by Tchaikovsky. Selected works] (in Russian). Л.: Музыка (Ленинградское отделение). pp. 3–13.
- Zakharova, O. I. (2003). "Религиозные взгляды Чайковского". П. И. Чайковский: Забытое и новое [P. Tchaikovsky: Forgotten and New] (in Russian). М.: Государственный Дом-музей П. И. Чайковского в Клину. pp. 162–166.
- Zakharova, O. I. (1990). "Чайковский читает Библию". Наше наследие: Журнал [Our Legacy: Journal] (in Russian). М.: Искусство. pp. 22–24. ISSN 0234-1395.
- Kaigorodov, D. N. (1907). П. И. Чайковский и природа. Биографический очерк [P. I. Tchaikovsky and Nature. Biographical sketch] (in Russian). СПб.: Типография А. С. Суворина. p. 46.
- Kitaeva, E. O. (2010). Оперы П. И. Чайковского 1880-х годов: поэтика трагического. Автореферат диссертации на соискание учёной степени кандидата искусствоведения [Tchaikovsky's operas of the 1880s: the poetics of the tragic. Abstract of the dissertation for the degree of Candidate of Art History] (in Russian). М.: Российская академия музыки имени Гнесиных. p. 27.
- Kladova, I. P. (2021). "П. I. Tchaikovsky. "All-Night Vigil": Contexts of Perception of Symbols and Archetypes of Sacred Time" (PDF). Вестник музыкальной науки: Журнал [Bulletin of music science: journal] (in Russian). М.: Новосибирская государственная консерватория имени М. И. Глинки. pp. 155–168. ISSN 2308-1031.
- Klimovitsky, A. I. (2015). "На рубеже веков: П. И. Чайковский и Серебряный век". Пётр Ильич Чайковский. Культурные предчувствия. Культурная память. Культурные взаимодействия [Pyotr Ilyich Tchaikovsky. Cultural anticipations. Cultural memory. Cultural interactions] (in Russian). СПб.: Петрополиc. pp. 379–411. ISBN 978-5-9676-0665-6.
- Kovalevsky, G. V. (2017). "Религиозные взгляды П. И. Чайковского в контексте культуры его времени: к истории несостоявшегося диалога". Вестник Русской христианской гуманитарной академии: Журнал [Bulletin of the Russian Christian Humanitarian Academy: Journal] (in Russian). Vol. 18. СПб.: Русская христианская гуманитарная академия. pp. 220–231.
- Konisskaya, L. M. (1974). "В Училище правоведения". Чайковский в Петербурге [Tchaikovsky to St. Petersburg] (in Russian). Л.: Лениздат. pp. 27–60.
- Kremlev, Yu. A. (1955). "Шестая симфония". Симфонии П. И. Чайковского [Tchaikovsky's symphonies] (in Russian). М.: Государственное музыкальное издательство. pp. 241–295.
- Kunin, I. F. (1958). Пётр Ильич Чайковский [Pyotr Ilyich Tchaikovsky]. Жизнь замечательных людей (Том 265) (in Russian). М.: Молодая гвардия. p. 365.
- Makarova, A. L. (2012). "Философско-религиозная проблематика в эпистолярном наследии П. И. Чайковского". Жизнь религии в музыке: Сборник статей [The life of religion in music: a collection of articles] (in Russian). СПб.: Северная звезда. pp. 40–61. ISBN 978-5-9050-4218-8.
- Makarova, A. L. (2017). Мистериальные прообразы в оперном творчестве П. И. Чайковского. Автореферат диссертации на соискание учёной степени кандидата искусствоведения [Mysterial prototypes in the opera works of P. I. Tchaikovsky. Abstract of the dissertation for the degree of Candidate of Art History] (in Russian). Магнитогорск: Уральская государственная консерватория имени М. П. Мусоргского. p. 31.
- Makarova, A. L. (2016). "«Орлеанская дева» П. И. Чайковского: от «национальной трагедии» к мистерии спасения". Первый всероссийский конкурс молодых ученых в области искусств и культуры. 2014 [First All-Russian Competition of Young Scientists in Arts and Culture. 2014] (in Russian). М.: Пробел-2000. pp. 59–90. ISBN 978-5-9860-4576-4.
- Medushevsky, V. V. (2019). "Отзыв о книге Г. С. Сизко «Духовный путь Чайковского»". Г. С. Сизко «Духовный путь Чайковского» [G. S. Sizko, Tchaikovsky's spiritual way] (in Russian). М.: Издательский Совет Русской Православной Церкви. pp. 5–8. ISBN 978-5-4465-2284-2.
- Okhalova, I. V. (2015). Пётр Ильич Чайковский [Pyotr Ilyich Tchaikovsky]. Школьная библиотека (in Russian). М.: ГАММА-ПРЕСС. p. 200. ISBN 978-5-9612-0055-3.
- Petukhova, S. A. (2014). Библиография жизни и творчества П. И. Чайковского. Указатель литературы, вышедшей на русском языке за 140 лет 1866—2006 [Bibliography of the life and works of P. I. Tchaikovsky. Index of literature published in Russian for 140 years 1866-2006] (PDF) (in Russian). М.: Государственный институт искусствознания. p. 856. ISBN 978-5-9828-7081-0.
- Poberezhnaia, G. I. (2003). "«Масонский след» в творчестве Чайковского". П. И. Чайковский: Забытое и новое [P. Tchaikovsky: Forgotten and New] (in Russian). М.: Государственный Дом-музей П. И. Чайковского в Клину. pp. 99–113.
- Poberezhnaia, G. I. (1994). "Послесловие". Пётр Ильич Чайковский [Pyotr Ilyich Tchaikovsky] (in Russian). Киев: Рос. мовою. pp. 337–343. ISBN 5-8238-0156-4.
- Poznansky, A. N. (2009a). Пётр Чайковский. Биография. В 2-х томах [Peter Tchaikovsky. Biography. In 2 volumes]. Жизнеописания (in Russian). Vol. 2. СПб.: Вита Нова. p. 624.
- Poznansky, A. N. (2009b). Пётр Чайковский. Биография. В 2-х томах [Peter Tchaikovsky. Biography. In 2 volumes]. Жизнеописания (in Russian). Vol. 1. СПб.: Вита Нова. p. 608. ISBN 978-5-9389-8229-1.
- Poznansky, A. N. (2007). Смерть Чайковского. Легенды и факты [Tchaikovsky's death. Legends and facts] (in Russian). СПб.: Композитор. p. 254. ISBN 978-5-7379-0361-9.
- Poznansky, A. N. (2011). Чайковский в Петербурге [Tchaikovsky in St. Petersburg] (in Russian). СПб.: Композитор. p. 544. ISBN 978-5-7379-0445-6.
- Preobrazhensky, A. V. (1894a). "Чайковского в области церковного пения". Екатеринославские епархиальные ведомости: Журнал [Ekaterinoslav Diocesan Vedomosti: Journal] (PDF) (in Russian). Екатериновлав: Екатеринославская епархия. pp. 589–605.
- Preobrazhensky, A. V. (1894b). "Чайковского в области церковного пения". Екатеринославские епархиальные ведомости: Журнал [Ekaterinoslav Diocesan Vedomosti: Journal] (PDF) (in Russian). Екатериновлав: Екатеринославская епархия. pp. 571–580.
- Pribegina, G. A. (1983). "Артист — своей Родине". Пётр Ильич Чайковский [Pyotr Ilych Tchaikovsky]. Русские и советские композиторы. Библиотечная серия (in Russian). М.: Музыка. pp. 116–142.
- Raku, M. G. (2001). "Миф о Чайковском и власть". Музыкальная академия: Ежеквартальный научный и критико-публицистический журнал [Musical Academy: A quarterly scientific and critical journal] (in Russian). М.: Композитор. pp. 126–138. ISSN 0869-4516.
- Rytsaryov, M. G. (2017). Тайна Патетической Чайковского (о скрытой программе Шестой симфонии) [The Mystery of Tchaikovsky's Pathetique (on the hidden program of the Sixth Symphony)] (in Russian). СПб.: Композитор. p. 176. ISBN 978-5-7379-0887-4.
- Sidelnikov, L. S. (1992). П. И. Чайковский [P. I. Tchaikovsky]. Жизнь в искусстве (in Russian). М.: Искусство. p. 352. ISBN 5-2100-2306-0.
- Sizko, G. S. (2019). Духовный путь Чайковского [Tchaikovsky's spiritual way] (in Russian). М.: Издательский Совет Русской Православной Церкви. p. 96. ISBN 978-5-4465-2284-2.
- Sizko, G. S. (2003). "Чайковский и православие". П. И. Чайковский: Забытое и новое [P. Tchaikovsky: Forgotten and New] (in Russian).
- Sokolov, V. S. (2003a). "Петербургские «тайны» в родословной и биографии Чайковского". П. И. Чайковский: Забытое и новое [P. Tchaikovsky: Forgotten and New] (in Russian). М.: Государственный Дом-музей П. И. Чайковского в Клину. pp. 236–245.
- Sokolov, V. S. (1994). Антонина Чайковская. История забытой жизни [Antonina Tchaikovskaya. The story of a forgotten life] (in Russian). М.: Музыка. p. 295. ISBN 5-7140-0565-1.
- Sokolov, V. S. (2003b). "Родословная Чайковского: новые имена". Петербургский музыкальный архив: Сборник научных статей [St. Petersburg musical archive : Collection of scientific articles] (in Russian). Vol. 4. Чайковский. Новые документы и материалы. СПб.: Композитор. pp. 7–35. ISBN 5-7379-0215-3.
- Tumanina, N. V. (1962). "Введение". П. И. Чайковский [P. I. Tchaikovsky] (in Russian). Vol. 1. Путь к мастерству. 1840—1877. М.: Издательство Академии наук СССР. pp. 15–32.
- Tumanina, N. V. (1968). П. И. Чайковский [P. I. Tchaikovsky] (in Russian). Vol. Великий мастер. 1878—1893. М.: Наука. p. 487.
- Khazdan, Е. V. (2017). Тайна Патетической Чайковского (о скрытой программе Шестой симфонии) [The Mystery of Tchaikovsky's Pathetique (on the hidden program of the Sixth Symphony)] (in Russian). Спб.: Композитор • Санкт-Петербург. p. 176. ISBN 978-5-7379-0887-4.
- Kharkovsky, А. (2018). "Ключ на видном месте. Книга Марины Рыцаревой «Тайна Патетической Чайковского». О скрытой программе Шестой симфонии". Музыкальное обозрение: Журнал [Music Review: Journal] (in Russian). М. ISSN 2224-7025.
- Brown, D. (2009). Tchaikovsky. The Man and his Music. New York: Pegasus Books. p. 512. ISBN 978-1605-9801-71.
- Dolskaya, О. (1999). Tchaikovsky and Russian Choral Tradition // Tchaikovsky and his contemporaries: a centennial symposium. Contributions to the Study of Music and Dance (Number 49). Westport, Connecticut; London: Greenwood Press. pp. 189–195. ISBN 0-313-30825-X.
- Klimovitsky, A. (1998). Tchaikovsky and the Russian «Silver Age» // Tchaikovsky and His World. The Bard Music Festival (Volume 35). Princeton: Princeton University Press. pp. 319–329. doi:10.1515/9781400864881.319. ISBN 0-6910-0429-3.
- Morosan, V. (1999). A Stranger in a Strange Land: Tchaikovsky as a Composer of Church Music // Tchaikovsky and his contemporaries: a centennial symposium. Contributions to the Study of Music and Dance (Number 49). Westport, Connecticut; London: Greenwood Press. pp. 198–225. ISBN 0-313-30825-X.
- Wiley, R. J. (2009). Tchaikovsky. The Master Musicians. Oxford: Oxford University Press. p. 592. ISBN 978-0195-3689-25.
- Ritzarev, М. (2014). Tchaikovsky's Pathétique and Russian culture. Burlington: Ashgate Publishing limited. pp. 1–8 / 151–156. ISBN 978-1-4724-2411-2.

=== Guides ===
- Dombaev, G. S. (1958). "Вокальная музыка для смешанного хора без сопровождения". Творчество Петра Ильича Чайковского в материалах и документах [Pyotr Ilyich Tchaikovsky's work in materials and documents] (in Russian). М.: Государственное музыкальное издательство. pp. 273–276.

=== Mass-media ===
- Volkov, S. M. (2001). «Страсти по Чайковскому». Разговоры с Джорджем Баланчиным [The Tchaikovsky Passion. Conversations with George Balanchine]. Диалоги о культуре (in Russian). М.: Независимая газета. p. 143. ISBN 5-8671-2092-9.
- Nikitin, B. S. (1990). Чайковский. Старое и новое [Tchaikovsky. Old and new] (in Russian). М.: Знание.
