= Christian music =

Music expressing Christian life and faith

Christian music is a genre of music that has been written to express either personal or a communal belief regarding Christian life and faith. Common themes of Christian music include praise, worship, penitence, and lament, and its forms vary widely around the world. Church music, hymnals, gospel, and worship music are a part of Christian media and also include contemporary Christian music which itself supports numerous Christian styles of music, including hip hop, rock, contemporary worship, and urban contemporary gospel.

Like other forms of music the creation, performance, significance, and even the definition of Christian music varies according to culture and social context. Christian music can serve various functions, such as ceremonial, educational, aesthetical, or for entertainment purposes.

== Worship services ==
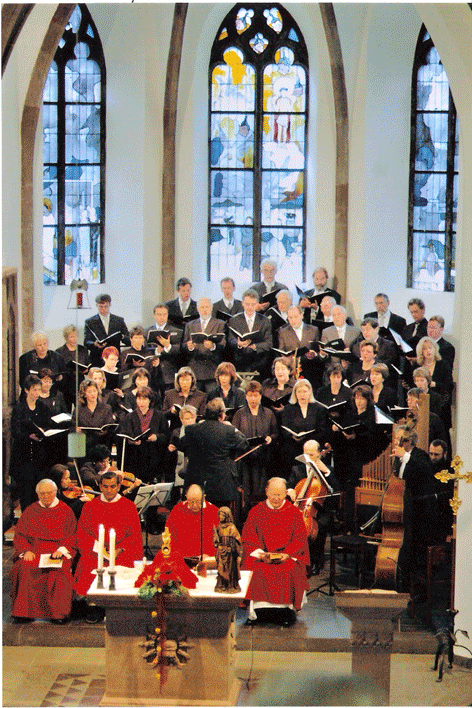
A church choir singing

Among the most prevalent uses of Christian music are in church worship or other gatherings. Most Christian music involves singing, whether by the whole congregation (assembly), or by a specialized subgroup—such as a soloist, duet, trio, quartet, madrigal, choir, or worship band—or both. It is frequently accompanied by instruments, but some denominations such as some Exclusive Brethren, the Churches of Christ, the Primitive Baptists, and the Free Church of Scotland prefer unaccompanied or a cappella singing. Other denominations such as Baptists, Methodists, and Presbyterians sing alongside some form on accompaniments. Some groups, such as the Bruderhof, sing songs both with religious and non-religious meanings and words. For them, the act of singing is important. One of the earliest forms of worship music in the church was the Gregorian chant. Pope Gregory I, while not the inventor of chant, was acknowledged as the first person to order such music in the church, hinting the name "Gregorian" chant. The chant reform took place around 590–604 CE (reign of Pope Gregory I) (Kamien, pg. 65–67). The Gregorian chant was known for its very monophonic sound. Believing that complexity had a tendency to create cacophony, which ruined the music, Gregory I kept things very simple with the chant.

=== Instrumental accompaniment ===
A page (leaf 12 recto) from Beethoven's manuscript. Catholic monks developed the first forms of modern Western musical notation in order to standardize liturgy throughout the worldwide church, and an enormous body of religious music has been composed for it through the ages. This led directly to the emergence and development of European classical music, and its many derivatives. The Baroque style, which encompassed music, art, and architecture, was particularly encouraged by the post-Reformation Catholic Church as such forms offered a means of religious expression that was stirring and emotional, intended to stimulate religious fervor.

In the West, the majority of Christian denominations use instruments such as an organ, piano, electronic keyboard, guitar, or other accompaniment, and occasionally by a band or orchestra, to accompany the singing. But some churches have historically not used instruments, citing their absence from the New Testament. During the last century or so several of these groups have revised this stance.

The singing of the Eastern Orthodox is also generally unaccompanied, though in the United States organs are sometimes used as a result of Western influence.

=== Instrumental music ===
Some worship music may be unsung, simply instrumental. During the Baroque period in Europe, the chorale prelude (for organ) was widely used, generally composed by using a popular hymn tune thematically, and a wide corpus of other solo organ music began to develop across Europe. Some of the most well-known exponents of such organ compositions include Johann Sebastian Bach, Dieterich Buxtehude, George Frideric Handel, François Couperin, César Franck, and Charles-Marie Widor to name a few. Up to the present time, various composers have written instrumental (often organ) music as acts of worship, including well known organ repertoire by composers like Olivier Messiaen, Louis Vierne, Maurice Duruflé, and Jean Langlais.

The church sonata (for orchestra and chamber group) and other sacred instrumental musical forms also developed from the Baroque period onwards.

== Types of Christian music ==
Christian music includes a wide range of genres that show the diversity of worship styles, culture influence, and artistic expressions made by different people. While traditional Christian music like hymns remain foundational, modern Christian music has evolved to sound more like to mainstream music, helping artists reach new audiences.

Some of the main genres in Christian music include:

=== Chants ===
A chant is the iterative speaking or singing of words or sounds, often primarily on one or two main pitches called reciting tones. Chants may range from a simple melody involving a limited set of notes to highly complex musical structures, often including a great deal of repetition of musical subphrases, such as Great Responsories and Offertories of Gregorian chant. Chant may be considered speech, music, or a heightened or stylized form of speech. In the later Middle Ages, some religious chant evolved into song (forming one of the roots of later Western music).

Mostly used in Anglican, Catholic, and Orthodox churches. Some examples of chants are:

- Ambrosian chant
- Anglican chant
- Armenian chant
- Celtic chant
- Ethiopian chant
- Galician chant
- Gregorian chant
- Kievan chant
- Mozarabic chant
- Old Roman chant
- Syriac chant

=== Metrical Psalters ===
A metrical psalter is a kind of Bible translation: a book containing a metrical translation of all or part of the Book of Psalms in vernacular poetry, meant to be sung as hymns in a church. Some metrical psalters include melodies or even harmonisations. The composition of metrical psalters was a large enterprise of the Protestant Reformation, especially in its Calvinist manifestation.

Mostly used in reformed churches, and anabaptists. Some examples of psalters are:

- Genevan Psalter
- German Psalter "des Königlichen Propheten David"
- Dutch Psalter
- Scottish Metrical Psalter (1650)

=== Hymns ===
A Reformation approach, the normative principle of worship, produced a burst of hymn writing and congregational singing. Martin Luther is notable not only as a reformer, but as the author of many hymns including "Ein feste Burg ist unser Gott" ("A Mighty Fortress Is Our God"), and "Gelobet seist du, Jesu Christ" ("Praise be to You, Jesus Christ"). Luther and his followers often used their hymns, or chorales, to teach tenets of the faith to worshipers. The first Protestant hymnal was published in Bohemia in 1532 by the Unitas Fratrum. Mostly used by Protestant churches, principally Lutheran, Methodist, and Hussite traditions, but in some areas also by Roman Catholic and Anabaptists. Some examples of famous hymnals are:

- Ausbund, oldest Anabaptist hymnal
- Baptist Hymnal
- Evangelisches Kirchengesangbuch, the first hymnal in German speaking churches
- Hymnbooks of the Church of Scotland
- Jistebnice hymn book, Czech hymnal from around 1430

=== Contemporary Christian music ===
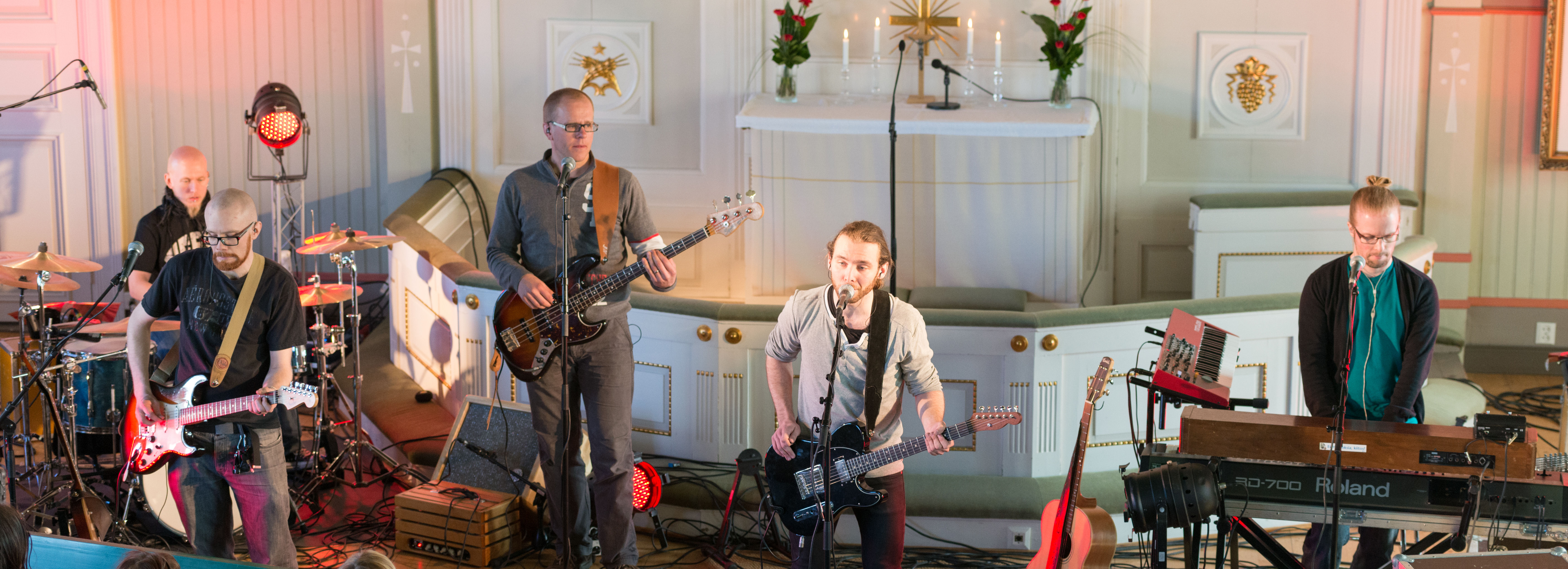
Pro Fide, a Finnish Christian rock band, in 2012

From the latter half of the 20th century to the present day in Western Christendom—especially in the United States and in other countries with evangelical churches—various genres of music originally often related to pop rock, have been created under the label of Contemporary Christian Music ("CCM") for personal listening and concert use. It can be divided into several genres and subgenres, although the dividing lines and relationships between music genres are often subtle, sometimes open to individual interpretation, and occasionally controversial. These genres (sometimes referred to as "style") like other forms of music may be distinguished by the techniques, the styles, the context and the themes, or geographical origin. Specific subgenres of CCM may include (but are not limited to): Christian country music, Christian pop, Christian rock, Christian metal, Christian hardcore, Christian punk, Christian alternative rock, Christian R&B, Christian electronic dance music, and Christian hip-hop.

In the 1980s and 1990s, contemporary Christian music played a significant role in Evangelical Christian worship. A great variety of musical styles has developed traditional praise.

Christian Country Music – Combines country instrumentation and storytelling with lyrics that focus on Christian values, faith, and redemption.

Christian Pop – A mainstream-sounding genre with catchy melodies and uplifting lyrics that reflect personal faith and spiritual growth.

Christian Rock – Rock music with themes of hope, worship, and biblical truth. Popular among youth and often performed in concerts and festivals.

Christian Metal – A heavy, strong form of music that delivers messages of faith and salvation through intense vocals and instrumentation.

Christian Hardcore – A subgenre of Christian metal or punk featuring screamed vocals and fast tempos, often used to express deep emotional or spiritual struggles.

Christian Punk – Combines the fast sound of punk rock with Christian messages, typically promoting themes of justice, humility, and personal conviction.

Christian Alternative Rock – A more experimental style of rock music with faith-centered lyrics, offering a wide range of emotional and artistic expression.

Christian R&B – Smooth, soulful music that blends R&B sound with lyrics about faith, love, healing, and encouragement.

Christian Electronic Dance Music (EDM) – Uses electronic beats and synthesizers to create energetic tracks with Christian-themed lyrics, often heard at youth events or worship gatherings.

Christian Hip-Hop – A rhythmic and lyrical genre that communicates biblical truths and spiritual reflection through rap and spoken word, especially popular with younger audiences.

==== Other languages ====
Similar developments took place in other language, for example the German Neues Geistliches Lied and Korean Contemporary Christian music.

==== Industry ====
Christian music is supported by a segment of the general music industry which evolved as a parallel structure to the same. Beginning in the 1970s and developing out of the Jesus movement, the Christian music industry subsequently developed into a near-billion dollar enterprise. By the 1990s the genre had eclipsed classical, jazz, and new-age music, and artists began gaining acceptance in the general market. There are several programs of schooling that have been created to create new christian artists such as Hillsong College in Norwest, Australia, and Visible Christian College in Memphis, TN U.S.A. Hillsong United is the band out of Hillsong college and they took the worship music scene by storm in 2016 with the song "What a Beautiful Name" which won the GMA Dove song of the year in 2017. Other famous artists include dc Talk, Chris Tomlin, Casting Crowns, Amy Grant, and Skillet.

==== Media ====
Today, Christian music is available through most available media. Christian music is broadcast over the radio, television, or the Internet. Christian Albums and video recordings (CD, LP, digital download, DVD, etc.) have been increasingly more popular and have continued to increase in sales.

Christian Musicals is another growing area, especially with the help of the internet. Church drama groups frequently enjoy performing musical dramas which can be downloaded on-line for free use.

There are Christian tv shows and movies. One example of a Christian TV show is the drama series called The Chosen, and children's shows such as VeggieTales. There is a whole series of Christian movies by the Kendrick Brothers production company, who have created movies such as Fireproof, Overcomer, and Courageous.

==== Music festivals and conferences ====
In the US several Christian music festivals have been organized. They are common in the summertime and draw many different people, specifically those from organized groups such as church youth groups and campus groups. In addition to music festivals like those that are part of the Christian Festival Association, there are also many Christian conferences which focus more on speakers, but usually also have musical performances, especially for a Worship service.

The Ichthus Music Festival started in 1970. Today festivals are held annually around the world, and may draw upwards of 100,000 people.

New Zealand's Parachute Music Festival, the largest Christian music festival in the Southern Hemisphere, began in 1989 and is held annually at Mystery Creek Events Centre outside the city of Hamilton.

England's Big Church Day Out Festival began in 2009 and has annual attendance of approximately 20,000.

==== Concerts ====
Like any musical group or act, many Christian musical artists perform concerts in concert halls, bars & clubs, or outdoor venues, as well as in church-related venues. Sometimes it may be for pure entertainment, other times with the intention of witnessing (evangelizing by bearing witness of one's faith), and other times may be part worship as well.

== See also ==
- Muslim music
- Byzantine music
- Christian radio
- Gospel music
- History of music in the biblical period
- Hymn
- Liturgical music
- Mass (music)
- Religious music
- Worship presentation program
