= Prostopinije =

Type of Christian church chant

Prostopinije (простопѣние, Ukrainian простопініє, meaning Plain Chant in Church Slavonic) is a type of monodic church chant, closely related to other East Slavic chants such as Galician Samoilka, Kievan Chant and Znamenny chant. Prostopinije is used in the Ruthenian Greek Catholic Church, Slovak Greek Catholic Church, Hungarian Greek Catholic Church, and by the Carpatho-Russian Orthodox.

The tradition of Prostopinije chant is used in the lands of Galicia, Volhynia and Ruthenia. The Prostopinije traces its roots to the Slavic traditions of Old Kievan chant and Bulgarian chant, both stemming from the ancient Byzantine chant tradition. It was also affected by the local folk Carpathian music. The Prostopinije chant is purely monodic, lacking ison or any other support, as well as folk choral polyphony. Melodically, Prostopinije resembles Znamenny Chant and is closely related to it historically. Compared to Znamenny chant, however, most prostopinije sources feature much more chromatic movement.

== History ==
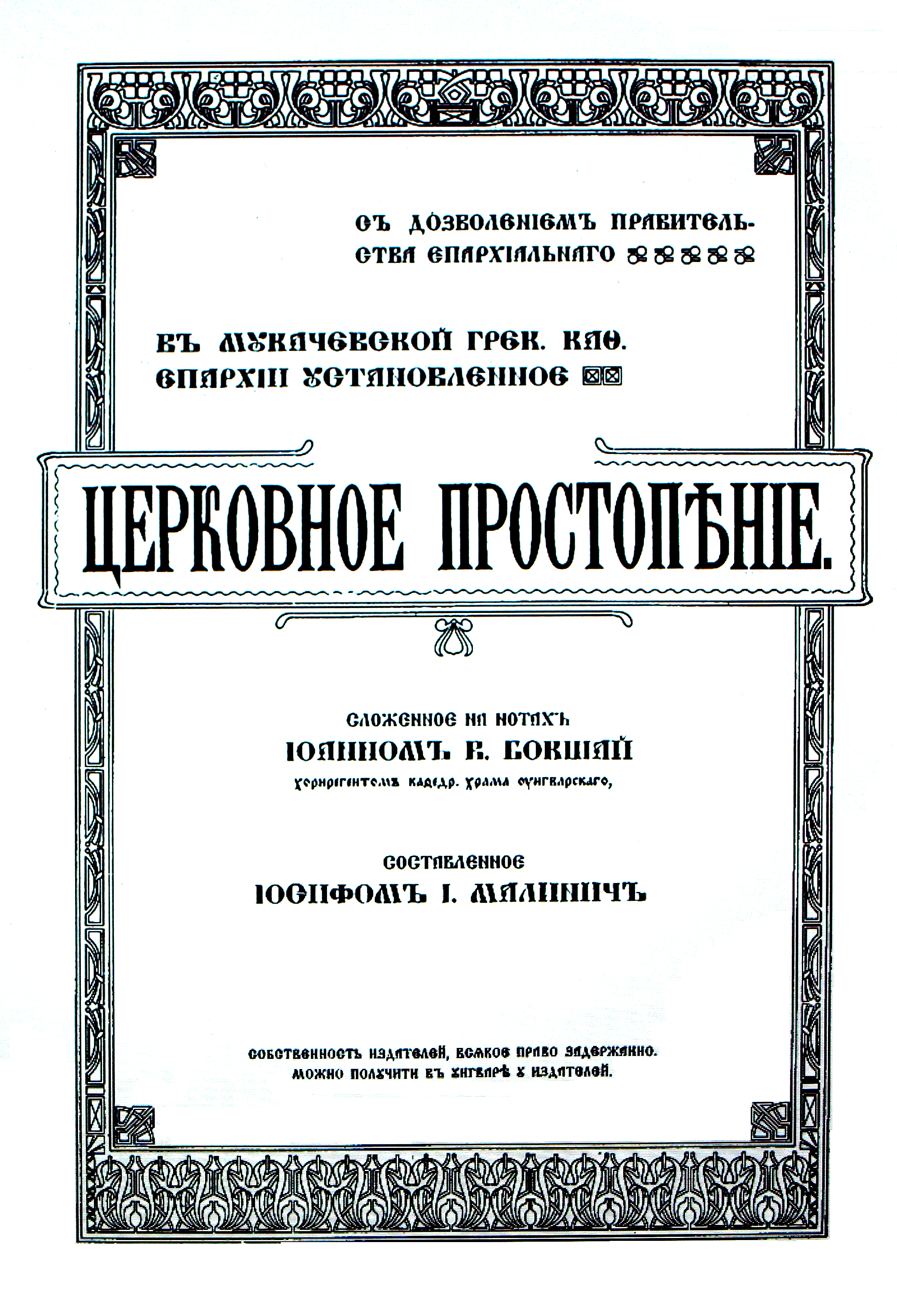
1906 edition of Prostopinije issued by the Mukachevo Eparchy

By the end of the 18th century, the first attempt to systematize and write down the body of Prostopinije melodies was undertaken by cantor John Juhasevich (1741–1814). In 1793, a Preparatory School for Cantors and Teachers was established in Uzhhorod by Bishop Andrew Bachinskyj.

In the 19th century and earlier, in liturgical practice, the chanting was performed by the trained cantor soloist; however, by the end of the 19th century, through the efforts of Father Andrew Popovich (1809–1898, Velika Kopanya, Ugocha district), the tradition was changed drastically. The whole congregation present in the church was encouraged to participate in the singing. This strong participation of lay people in the church singing was and still remains a relatively unique phenomenon among the similar chanting traditions.

In the beginning of the 20th century, some efforts to unify the Subcarpathian chanting traditions were also undertaken under supervision of Bishop Julius Firczak of Mukachevo by father John Bokšai (or Bokshai, 1874–1940) and cantor Joseph Malinič. They published the first manual for the Carpathian Plain Chant in Uzhhorod in 1906.

After some of the Rusyn parishes converted from Byzantine Catholicism to the Russian Orthodox Church in America, inspired by Father Alexis Toth, the use of Prostopinije was discriminated against by Russian leaders, who replaced it with the Obikhod. Since the early 21st century, however, a gradual revival of this traditional singing has taken place, just as ancient chants have been reintroduced in other churches and denominations.

== Notation ==
Unlike the practices of some other chanting traditions, Prostopinije remained a primarily aural, unwritten tradition for the major part of its history. Some leaders attempted to notate the chant, however, primarily as a means to systematize and unify it: first in Znamenny chant neumes, then (as of about year 1600) in "square and diamond" notation. Neither of these systems became widespread, however. In the contemporary practice, the chant is written in standard Western staff notation.

== Local variations ==
Due to the predominantly oral nature of the Prostopinije tradition, the majority of melodies exist in various local variants, and are sometimes different in even relatively close villages. The two largest branches of the tradition originate from the cathedral towns of Mukachevo and Prešov. Due to the geography of the region, the Mukachevo tradition became the main tradition of the Byzantine Rite Catholic Churches (through the Byzantine Catholic Archeparchy of Pittsburgh), while the latter has been relatively more common in the American Carpatho-Russian Orthodox Diocese.

The Prostopinije chant was traditionally performed either in Church Slavonic, or in Hungarian (Hungarian-language parishes musically followed the tradition of Mukachevo). In the modern practice in the United States, this chant is performed in English as well. In Slovakia it is also performed in Slovak.

== Bibliography ==
- "Церковное простопѣніе" (PDF). 1906.
- Prostopinije (Wilkes-Barre, 1925)
- Церковное простопѣніе (Pittsburgh, 1980)
- Prostopinije: The Liturgical Chant according to the Carpatho-Ruthenian Tradition (Pittsburgh: Byzantine Seminary Press, 1981)
- Joan L. Roccasalvo, The Plainchant Tradition of Southwestern Rusʹ (Boulder, Colorado: East European Monographs; Distributed by Columbia University Press, 1986)

== External links and further reading ==
- Metropolitan Cantor Institute – Archeparchy of Pittsburgh library of chant recordings and sheet music.
- Prostopinije – a page dedicated to the tradition, with a library of scores (in a Western staff notation), and sound examples.
- The Standard Teaching Text for Rusyn Chant, by Steve Puluka
