= Galician chant =

Liturgical chant originating in Ukraine

The Galician chant (Ukrainian: галицький розспів), is a form of liturgical chant originating in Western Ukraine, particularly in the region of Galacia. It is used predominantly in the Ukrainian Greek Catholic Church and in some Ukraine Orthodox communities in the diaspora (notably the Western Eparchy of the Ukrainian Orthodox Church of Canada), and to a lesser degree the Orthodox Church of Ukraine. Like the Kievan and Znamenny chants, the Galician chant is organized according to the system of eight tones (modes or glasy).

== History ==
The tradition of Galician chant arose as part of the broader East Slavic chant heritage and was influenced by both the Byzantine and local Ukrainian musical idioms. Printed collections and regional anthologies of Galician chant began to appear in the late 19th century; the first Ukrainian regional compilations of church chant were published in 1894. The repertoire preserves older Kyivan-style melodies as well as Western-influenced harmonizations that developed under the Austro-Hungarian cultural sphere.

== Usage in the Ukrainian Greek Catholic Church ==
Within the Ukrainian Greek Catholic Church, the Galician chant remains the principal traditional chant used for the Divine Liturgy and other services in Western Ukrainian eparchies. Modern compilations and teaching resources continue to transmit this tradition, often in harmonized or simplified notation for parish use. Collections such as the "Samoilka" (Самолівка) and local diocesan hymnals contain standard Galician chant settings of the eight tones.

== Usage in Ukrainian Orthodox traditions ==
Although the chant developed primarily within the Greek Catholic social environment, it is also used in certain Orthodox jurisdictions of Ukrainian heritage, particularly in the Western Eparchy of the Ukrainian Orthodox Church of Canada and occasionally within the Orthodox Church of Ukraine. Some Orthodox parishes maintain Galician chant melodies alongside Kievan chant and Obikhod traditions.

== Musical characteristics ==
Like other Slavic chant traditions, Galician chant is organized according to the Oktoechos system of eight tones (glasy), each with its characteristic melodic formulas and cadences. Its melodic language is generally more syllabic and less ornate than that of Byzantine chant, and harmonized variants often reflect Western European tonal influence.

== Notation and sources ==
Galician chant manuscripts and printed collections use modern staff notation rather than the older Znamenny notation. Major sources include 19th- and early 20th-century publications preserved in the libraries of Lviv, Przemyśl, and Kyiv, as well as catalogued items in the National Library of Ukraine.

== See also ==
- Kievan chant
- Znamenny chant
- Byzantine chant
- Ukrainian Greek Catholic Church
- Ukrainian Orthodox Church of Canada
