= Znamenny chant =

Musical form

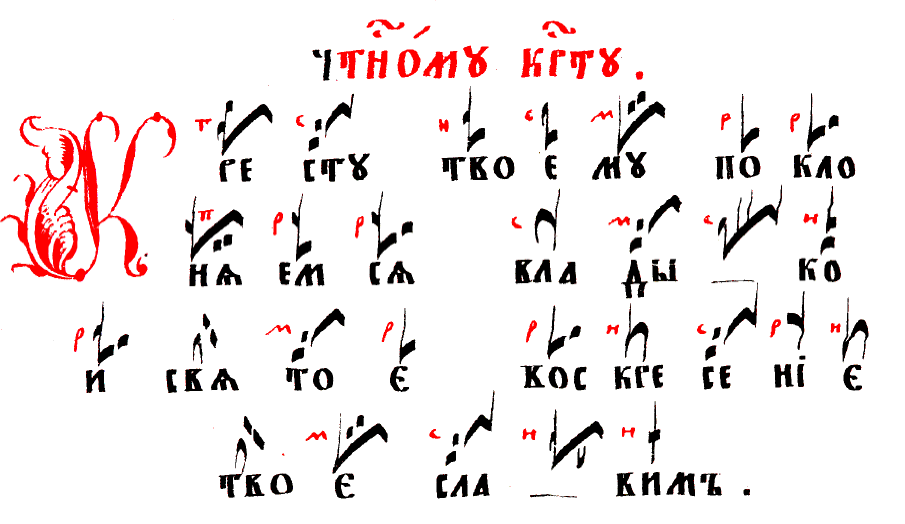
An example of Znamenny notation with "cinnabar marks", Russia, 1884. "Thy Cross we honour, oh Lord, and Thy holy Resurrection we praise."

"O Heavenly King" (Царю́ Небе́сный), sung as a Znamenny Chant by "Old Russian Chant", a male chamber choir of the Moscow Patriarchate

Znamenny Chant (Church Slavonic: знаменное пение, знаменный распев) is a singing tradition used by some in the Russian Eastern Orthodox Church. Znamenny Chant is a unison, melismatic liturgical singing that has its own specific notation, called the stolp notation. The symbols used in the stolp notation are called kryuki (Church Slavonic: крюки, 'hooks') or znamëna (Church Slavonic: знамёна, 'signs'). Often the names of the signs are used to refer to the stolp notation. Znamenny melodies are part of a system, consisting of 'eight tones' (intonation structures; called glasi); the melodies are characterized by fluency and balance.

There exist several types of Znamenny Chant: the so-called Stolpovoy, Malyj (Little) and Bolshoy (Great) Znamenny Chant. Ruthenian Chant (Prostopinije) is sometimes considered a sub-division of the Znamenny Chant tradition, with the Russian Chant (Znamenny Chant proper) being the second branch of the same musical continuum.

== Notation ==
Znamenny Chants are not written with notes (the so-called 'linear notation'), but with special signs, called znamëna (Church Slavonic for "marks", "banners") or kryuki ("hooks"), as some shapes of these signs resemble hooks. Each sign may include the following components: a large black hook or a black stroke, several smaller black 'points' and 'commas' and lines near the hook or crossing the hook. Znamenny notation would be incredibly difficult to interpret via modern western notation, due to the fact that the specific instructions provided by the signs were up for interpretation. For example, a sign could mean "1 sound, 1/2 down." It would be up to the individual singer to determine how long 1 sound was, what pitch 1 sound was, and how far "1/2 down" meant. This was due to the nature of Znamenny chant's oral tradition.

The most notable feature of this notation system is that it records transitions of the melody, rather than notes. This type of notation is known as neumatic notation, and they are adiastematic. The signs also represent a mood and a gradation of how this part of melody is to be sung (tempo, strength, devotion, meekness, etc.) Every sign has its own name and also features as a spiritual symbol. For example, there is a specific sign, called "dear dove" (Church Slavonic: голубчик, golubchik), which represents two rising sounds and is also a symbol of the Holy Ghost.

=== Development ===
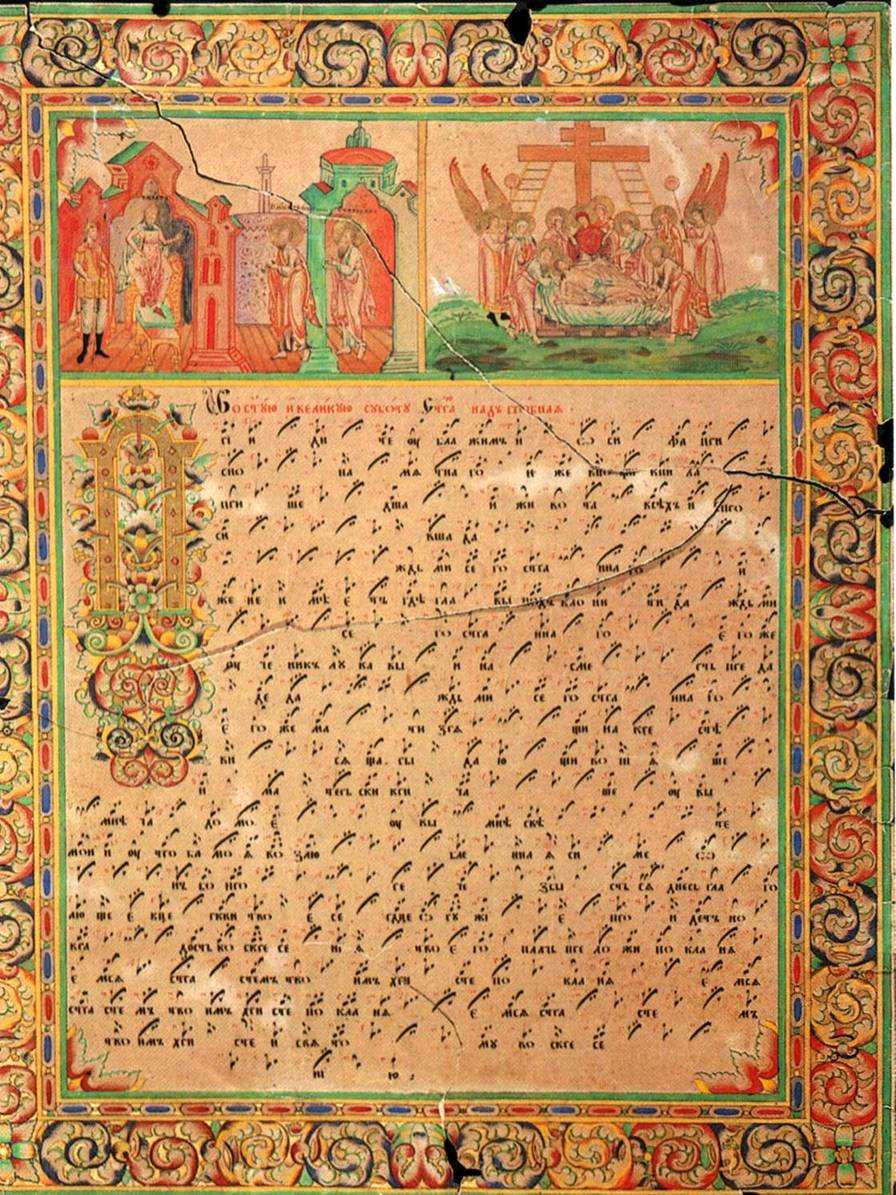
A hand-drawn lubok featuring 'hook and banner notation'

The stolp notation was developed in Kievan Rus' as an East Slavic refinement of the Byzantine neumatic musical notation. After 13th century, the Znamenny Chant and stolp notation continued to develop to the North (particularly in Novgorod), where it flourished and was adopted throughout the Grand Duchy of Moscow. Gradually the system became more and more complicated. This system was also ambiguous, so that almost no one, except the most trained and educated singers, could sing an unknown melody at sight. The signs only helped to reproduce the melody, not coding it in an unambiguous way.

Because of the complexity of the system, a simplification was developed by Ivan Shaidurov around 1600, called "cinnabar marks" (Russian: киноварные знаки, kinovarnye znaki), which consisted of small letters in red and which were placed before each Znamenny sign. These indicate the highest note of the sign it stands before. This is generally regarded as the first step towards a certain simplification of the system.

The use and evolution of the system largely slowed in the middle of the 17th century after the church reforms by Patriarch Nikon. From that time Western music started to penetrate into Russian culture, and the Russian-Orthodox Church introduced a "Latin", polyphonic way of singing, based on Polish, German and Italian harmonies. The term "Latin" however was considered derogatory, since it also referred to "heretical Latin faith". Znamenny Chant, however, has been preserved to a certain degree in the chanting traditions that are directly descended from it.

=== Traditions ===
Currently, stolp notation (Znamenny signs) continues to be used by Russian Old Believers, mostly in combination with the above-mentioned "red marks", as shown in the first illustration. In the 19th century Edinovertsy, particularly outside Russia, have tried to move to the modern neumatic form of notation that tries to capture exact relations between pitches; and they currently use a standard linear notation.

Chanting traditions that preserve and/or are descended from the Znammeny chant include the following:

- Chanting traditions of the Russian Old Believers
  - Znamenny chant proper (Знамя, Большое Знамя)
  - Stolpovoy chant
  - Demesvenny chant or Demestvo (Демество)
  - Pomorsky chant
  - Kievan chant
- Ukrainian Chants
  - The chanting tradition of Galicia (known as Samoilka chant)
  - Prostopinije (or Plain Chant) of the Carpatho-Rusyns
- Valaam chant
- Doukhobor Psalm chant may also be derivative or at least related

The Strochnoy chant (early Russian polyphony) was also based on Znamenny chants, although it is not widely used in church practice now, it can occasionally be performed by some choirs. Many Russian composers (Sergei Rachmaninov, Alexander Grechaninov, Maximilian Steinberg, and Vladimir Martynov) studied Znamenny chants and used them in their compositions. There are also many adaptations of Znamenny melodies for four-part choir, popular in both Russia and abroad.

=== Unicode ===
Znamenny notation was added to the Unicode Standard in September, 2021 with the release of version 14.0.

The Unicode block for Znamenny Musical Notation is U+1CF00–U+1CFCF:

Znamenny Musical Notation^{[1]}^{[2]} Official Unicode Consortium code chart (PDF)
| | 0 | 1 | 2 | 3 | 4 | 5 | 6 | 7 | 8 | 9 | A | B | C | D | E | F |
| U+1CF0x | 𜼀 | 𜼁 | 𜼂 | 𜼃 | 𜼄 | 𜼅 | 𜼆 | 𜼇 | 𜼈 | 𜼉 | 𜼊 | 𜼋 | 𜼌 | 𜼍 | 𜼎 | 𜼏 |
| U+1CF1x | 𜼐 | 𜼑 | 𜼒 | 𜼓 | 𜼔 | 𜼕 | 𜼖 | 𜼗 | 𜼘 | 𜼙 | 𜼚 | 𜼛 | 𜼜 | 𜼝 | 𜼞 | 𜼟 |
| U+1CF2x | 𜼠 | 𜼡 | 𜼢 | 𜼣 | 𜼤 | 𜼥 | 𜼦 | 𜼧 | 𜼨 | 𜼩 | 𜼪 | 𜼫 | 𜼬 | 𜼭 | | |
| U+1CF3x | 𜼰 | 𜼱 | 𜼲 | 𜼳 | 𜼴 | 𜼵 | 𜼶 | 𜼷 | 𜼸 | 𜼹 | 𜼺 | 𜼻 | 𜼼 | 𜼽 | 𜼾 | 𜼿 |
| U+1CF4x | 𜽀 | 𜽁 | 𜽂 | 𜽃 | 𜽄 | 𜽅 | 𜽆 | | | | | | | | | |
| U+1CF5x | 𜽐 | 𜽑 | 𜽒 | 𜽓 | 𜽔 | 𜽕 | 𜽖 | 𜽗 | 𜽘 | 𜽙 | 𜽚 | 𜽛 | 𜽜 | 𜽝 | 𜽞 | 𜽟 |
| U+1CF6x | 𜽠 | 𜽡 | 𜽢 | 𜽣 | 𜽤 | 𜽥 | 𜽦 | 𜽧 | 𜽨 | 𜽩 | 𜽪 | 𜽫 | 𜽬 | 𜽭 | 𜽮 | 𜽯 |
| U+1CF7x | 𜽰 | 𜽱 | 𜽲 | 𜽳 | 𜽴 | 𜽵 | 𜽶 | 𜽷 | 𜽸 | 𜽹 | 𜽺 | 𜽻 | 𜽼 | 𜽽 | 𜽾 | 𜽿 |
| U+1CF8x | 𜾀 | 𜾁 | 𜾂 | 𜾃 | 𜾄 | 𜾅 | 𜾆 | 𜾇 | 𜾈 | 𜾉 | 𜾊 | 𜾋 | 𜾌 | 𜾍 | 𜾎 | 𜾏 |
| U+1CF9x | 𜾐 | 𜾑 | 𜾒 | 𜾓 | 𜾔 | 𜾕 | 𜾖 | 𜾗 | 𜾘 | 𜾙 | 𜾚 | 𜾛 | 𜾜 | 𜾝 | 𜾞 | 𜾟 |
| U+1CFAx | 𜾠 | 𜾡 | 𜾢 | 𜾣 | 𜾤 | 𜾥 | 𜾦 | 𜾧 | 𜾨 | 𜾩 | 𜾪 | 𜾫 | 𜾬 | 𜾭 | 𜾮 | 𜾯 |
| U+1CFBx | 𜾰 | 𜾱 | 𜾲 | 𜾳 | 𜾴 | 𜾵 | 𜾶 | 𜾷 | 𜾸 | 𜾹 | 𜾺 | 𜾻 | 𜾼 | 𜾽 | 𜾾 | 𜾿 |
| U+1CFCx | 𜿀 | 𜿁 | 𜿂 | 𜿃 | | | | | | | | | | | | |
Notes 1.As of Unicode version 18.0 2.Grey areas indicate non-assigned code points

== Performing practice ==
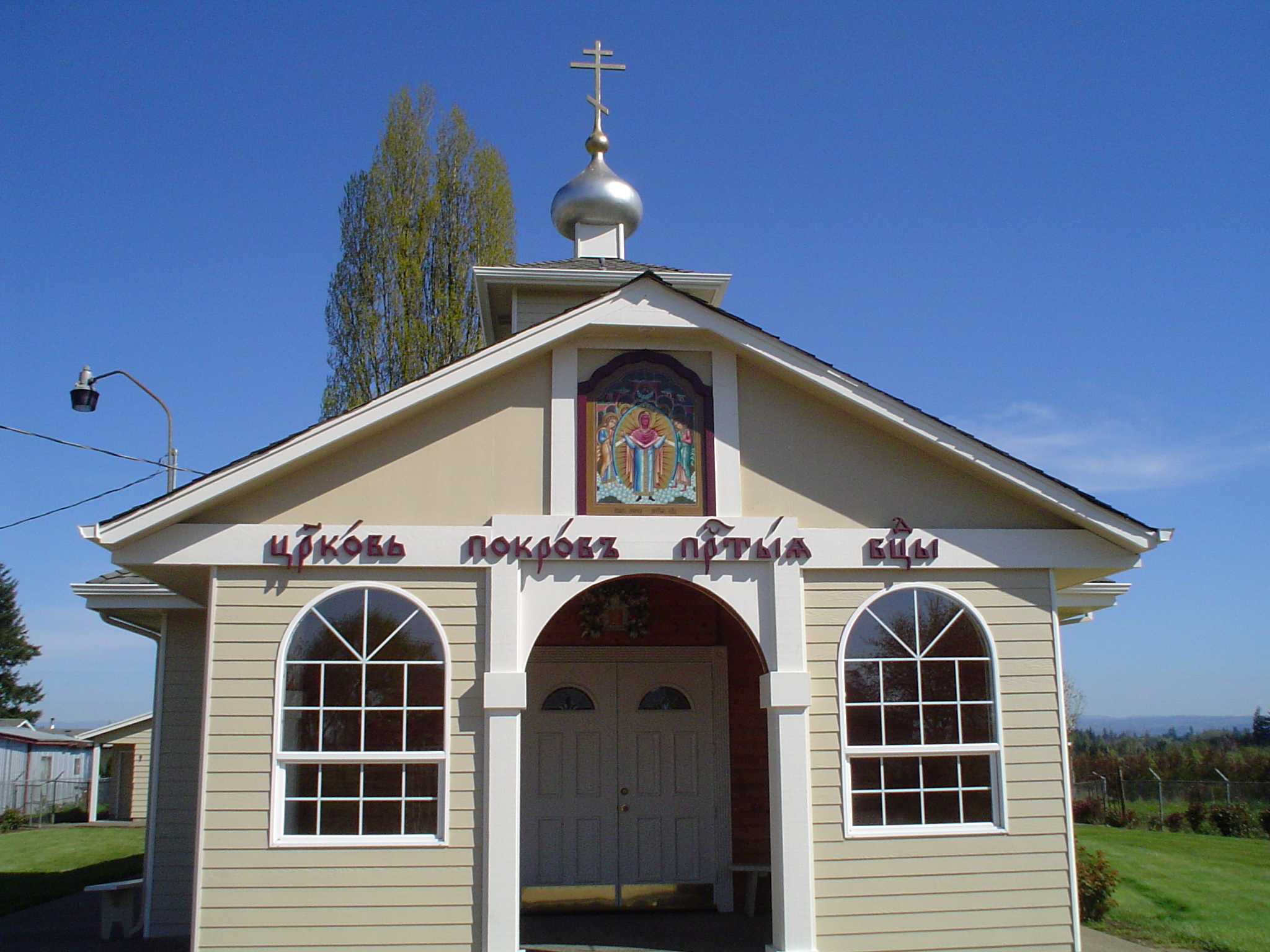
Currently operating Old Believer Church outside Gervais, Oregon

Since the Znamenny Chant requires a specific manner of performance, the chant books contain several instructions as to dynamics and tempo. For Old Believers, the church chant also has an educational function: one has to sing in such a way that the sound astonishes the ear and the truth, being enveloped in the chants, penetrates the heart. Znamenny performance practice excludes classical vocal training. Singers perform with their natural voice, sometimes in a style reminiscent of folk music. Znamenny Chant does not have any pauses or rests, and all chants are performed fluently. Ideally, singers will sing in such a way that their voices become united in one single voice. Originally, the Znamenny Chant was performed only by men but today, on account of the small number of people able to sing at church services and the evolution of the tradition, it is usually performed by both male and female voices.

== Bibliography ==
- Kholopov, Yuri (2003). Гармония. Теоретический курс. 2nd ed. Moscow; Saint Petersburg: Lan'. ISBN 5-8114-0516-2 (English: Harmony. A Theoretical Course; the 1st ed. is Moscow, 1988)
