= Obikhod =

Collection of Russian Orthodox liturgical chants

The Obikhod (Обиход церковного пения) is a collection of polyphonic Russian Orthodox liturgical chants forming a major tradition of Russian liturgical music; it includes both liturgical texts and psalm settings.

The original Obikhod, the book of rites of the monastery of Volokolamsk, was composed about 1575. Among its subjects were traditional liturgical chants. The Obikhod was originally monodic but later developed polyphony. In 1772 the Obikhod was the first compilation of music printed in Russia, in Moscow. The common version was extensively revised and standardized by composer Nikolai Rimsky-Korsakov; this version was published as the 1909 edition of the Obikhod, the last before the Russian Revolution.

The Obikhod style, and the 1909 edition, was predominantly used by the Russian Orthodox Church during the decades of Soviet Union rule in the 20th century. Its adoption displaced other Russian styles, and also the traditions of Georgian Chant, Armenian Chant, and Carpatho-Rusyn Prostopinije

Pyotr Ilyich Tchaikovsky drew from the Obikhod style for his 1812 Overture, as did Nikolai Rimsky-Korsakov in his Russian Easter Festival Overture. Anatoly Lyadov also drew from them in his Ten Arrangements from Obikhod Op. 61, as did Alexander Raskatov in his Obikhod (2002).

The pitch set used in these chants traditionally consists of four three-note groups. Each note within a group is separated by a whole tone, and each group is separated by a semitone. If starting from G, the result is: G, A, B / C, D, E / F, G, A / B♭, C, D. Theoretically, more groups can be added either above or below, which has been done by some 20th-century Russian composers. This pitch set also influenced Russian folk music: for example, the Livenka accordion contains the pitch set on its melody side.
