= Kievan chant =

Liturgical chant

Kievan chant, or chant in Kyivan style (Russian: Киевский распев, romanized: Kievskiy raspev; Ukrainian: Київський розспів, romanized: Kyïvs'kyy rozspiv), is one of the liturgical chants common to the Russian Orthodox Church, the Ukrainian Orthodox Church and those churches that have their roots in the Moscow Patriarchate, such as the Orthodox Church in America.

== History ==
During the course of the 17th century, three new types of Orthodox liturgical chant appeared in the Rus' region. The first of them was the Kievan chant, followed by the so-called "Bulgarian" or Bulgarski chant, and finally the "Greek" or Grecheski chant. They were collectively known by the term Obikhod.

The Kievan chant first developed in the southwestern region of Rus' (currently Eastern Ukraine) and then spread to Muscovite Russia. It was, in essence, a drastically simplified form of znamenny chant.

== Characteristics ==
Kievan chant melodies tend to be shorter and simpler rhythmically than znamenny melodies; there are more pronounced distinctions between recitative-like and melismatic passages; and certain phrases of text are repeated, something that generally does not occur in the znamenny chant.

The melodies of Kievan chant, for the most part, served as the basis for the so-called "Common" chant.
