= Classic 100 Symphony =

Radio survey in Australia

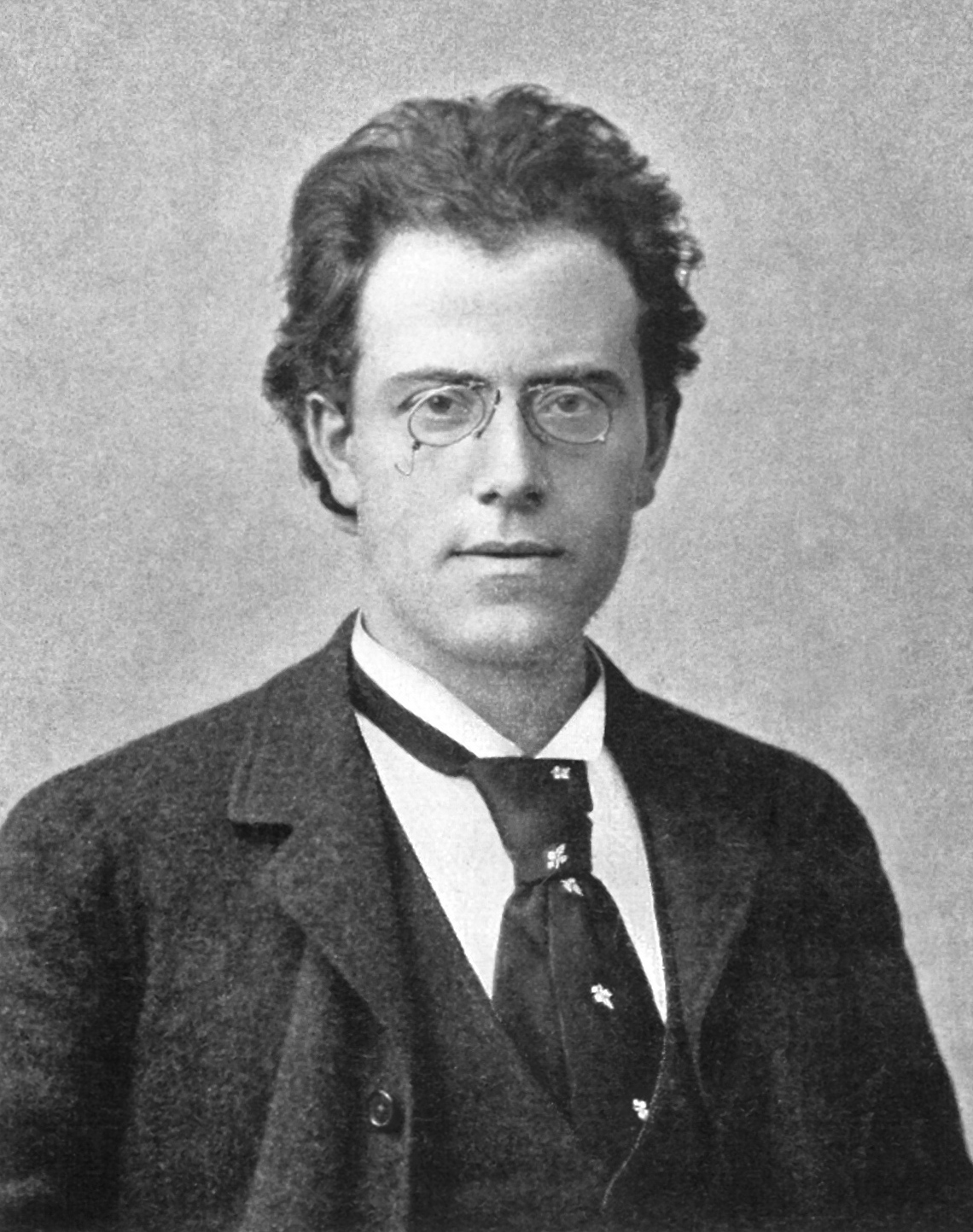
Gustav Mahler, who had more works in the list than any other composer (eight symphonies of the nine that he completed, without No. 7, and Das Lied von der Erde)

During 2009, the Australian ABC Classic FM radio station conducted a survey of listeners' favourite symphonies. Participants were permitted to vote for their three preferred symphonies. The survey closed at the end of June 2009.

The works were broadcast (from number 100 to number 1) from 12–19 September 2009.

== Survey summary ==
Rank	Composer	Work	Opus	Completed	Key	Length (minutes)
100	Haydn	Symphony No. 100 Military	Hob. I/100	1794	G major	25
99	Glass	Symphony No. 4 Heroes		1996		44
98	Dvořák	Symphony No. 5	Op. 76, B. 54	1875	F major	37
97	Schumann	Symphony No. 1 Spring	Op. 38	1841	B♭ major	33
96	Dvořák	Symphony No. 6	Op. 60, B. 112	1880	D major	43
95	Rachmaninoff	The Bells, choral symphony	Op. 35	1913		37
94	Stravinsky	Symphony of Psalms		1930		21
93	Sibelius	Symphony No. 6	Op. 104	1923	D minor	25
92	Shostakovich	Symphony No. 4	Op. 43	1936	C minor	68
91	Nielsen	Symphony No. 5	Op. 50	1922		35
90	Nielsen	Symphony No. 4 The Inextinguishable	Op. 29	1916		34
89	Mendelssohn	Lobgesang (Song of Praise, Symphony No. 2)	Op. 52	1840	B♭ major	65
88	Tchaikovsky	Symphony No. 2 Little Russian	Op. 17	1872	C minor	33
87	Berlioz	Harold en Italie, symphony for viola and orchestra	Op. 16	1834		44
86	Prokofiev	Symphony No. 5	Op. 100	1944	B♭ major	42
85	Haydn	Symphony No. 45 Farewell	Hob. I/45	1772	F♯ minor	25
84	Mahler	Das Lied von der Erde		1909		64
83	Sean O'Boyle	River Symphony		1999		24
82	Rachmaninoff	Symphony No. 1	Op. 13	1895	D minor	47
81	Philip Bračanin	Symphony No. 2 Choral		1995		39
80	Sibelius	Symphony No. 4	Op. 63	1911	A minor	33
79	Haydn	Symphony No. 104 London	Hob. I/104	1795	D major	28
78	Mendelssohn	Symphony No. 5 Reformation	Op. 107	1832	D major/D minor	29
77	Walton	Symphony No. 1		1935	B♭ minor	44
76	Vaughan Williams	Symphony No. 7 Sinfonia Antartica		1952		42
75	Tchaikovsky	Manfred Symphony	Op. 58	1885	B minor	48
74	Tchaikovsky	Symphony No. 1 Winter Daydreams	Op. 13	1866	G minor	44
73	Schumann	Symphony No. 3 Rhenish	Op. 97	1850	E♭ major	30
72	Mozart	Symphony No. 36 Linz	K. 425	1783	C major	26
71	Borodin	Symphony No. 2		1876	B minor	25
70	Mozart	Symphony No. 35 Haffner	K. 385	1782	D major	23
69	Bruckner	Symphony No. 9		1896	D minor	59
68	Mozart	Symphony No. 25	K. 183	1773	G minor	26
67	Ross Edwards	Symphony No. 1 Da pacem Domine		1991		29
66	Bruckner	Symphony No. 7		1883	E major	62
65	Vaughan Williams	Symphony No. 2 A London Symphony		1913	G major	43
64	Rachmaninoff	Symphony No. 3	Op. 44	1936	A minor	41
63	Beethoven	Symphony No. 2	Op. 36	1802	D major	33
62	Vaughan Williams	Symphony No. 1 A Sea Symphony		1909		66
61	Dvořák	Symphony No. 7	Op. 70, B. 141	1885	D minor	37
60	Beethoven	Symphony No. 4	Op. 60	1806	B♭ major	32
59	Vaughan Williams	Symphony No. 3 A Pastoral Symphony		1921		34
58	Haydn	Symphony No. 101 The Clock	Hob. I/101	1794	D major	29
57	Elgar	Symphony No. 2	Op. 63	1911	E♭ major	56
56	Messiaen	Turangalîla-Symphonie		1948		73
55	Mozart	Symphony No. 29	K. 201	1774	A major	29
54	Mahler	Symphony No. 6 Tragic		1904	A minor	87
53	Sibelius	Symphony No. 7	Op. 105	1924	C major	21
52	Bruckner	Symphony No. 8		1890	C minor	76
51	Mozart	Symphony No. 38 Prague	K. 504	1786	D major	25
50	Shostakovich	Symphony No. 11 The Year 1905	Op. 103	1957	G minor	64
49	Strauss, R.	An Alpine Symphony	Op. 64	1915		48
48	Sibelius	Symphony No. 1	Op. 39	1900	E minor	37
47	Shostakovich	Symphony No. 10	Op. 93	1953	E minor	51
46	Bruckner	Symphony No. 4 Romantic		1888	E♭ major	64
45	Haydn	Symphony No. 94 The Surprise	Hob. I/94	1791	G major	24
44	Vaughan Williams	Symphony No. 5		1943	D major	40
43	Sibelius	Symphony No. 3	Op. 52	1907	C major	29
42	Franck	Symphony in D minor		1888	D minor	39
41	Mahler	Symphony No. 9		1909	D major	81
40	Schubert	Symphony No. 5	D. 485	1816	B♭ major	27
39	Mahler	Symphony No. 3		1896	D minor	93
38	Mozart	Symphony No. 39	K. 543	1788	E♭ major	30
37	Beethoven	Symphony No. 8	Op. 93	1812	F major	25
36	Mahler	Symphony No. 8 Symphony of a Thousand		1907	E♭ major	80
35	Brahms	Symphony No. 2	Op. 73	1877	D major	41
34	Bizet	Symphony in C		1855	C major	28
33	Mahler	Symphony No. 4		1901	G major	58
32	Dvořák	Symphony No. 8	Op. 88, B. 163	1890	G major	36
31	Shostakovich	Symphony No. 7 Leningrad	Op. 60	1941	C major	85
30	Elgar	Symphony No. 1	Op. 55	1908	A♭ major	53
29	Brahms	Symphony No. 3	Op. 90	1883	F major	37
28	Tchaikovsky	Symphony No. 4	Op. 36	1878	F minor	44
27	Prokofiev	Symphony No. 1 Classical	Op. 25	1917	D major	14
26	Shostakovich	Symphony No. 5	Op. 47	1937	D minor	48
25	Sibelius	Symphony No. 5	Op. 82	1919	E♭ major	30
24	Mendelssohn	Symphony No. 3 Scottish	Op. 56	1842	A minor	34
23	Mendelssohn	Symphony No. 4 Italian	Op. 90	1833	A major	27
22	Brahms	Symphony No. 1	Op. 68	1876	C minor	44
21	Mahler	Symphony No. 1 Titan		1894	D major	54
20	Brahms	Symphony No. 4	Op. 98	1885	E minor	40
19	Schubert	Symphony No. 8 Unfinished	D. 759	1822	B minor	27
18	Mahler	Symphony No. 5		1902	C♯ minor	71
17	Górecki	Symphony No. 3 Symphony of Sorrowful Songs	Op. 36	1976		56
16	Rachmaninoff	Symphony No. 2	Op. 27	1907	E minor	59
15	Berlioz	Symphonie fantastique	Op. 14	1830		56
14	Mahler	Symphony No. 2 Resurrection		1894	C minor	84
13	Mozart	Symphony No. 40	K. 550	1788	G minor	35
12	Mozart	Symphony No. 41 Jupiter	K. 551	1788	C major	27
11	Tchaikovsky	Symphony No. 5	Op. 64	1888	E minor	46
10	Schubert	Symphony No. 9 Great	D. 944	1826	C major	60
9	Sibelius	Symphony No. 2	Op. 43	1902	D major	44
8	Beethoven	Symphony No. 3 Eroica	Op. 55	1804	E♭ major	45
7	Tchaikovsky	Symphony No. 6 Pathétique	Op. 74	1893	B minor	45
6	Beethoven	Symphony No. 5	Op. 67	1808	C minor	32
5	Beethoven	Symphony No. 7	Op. 92	1812	A major	39
4	Saint-Saëns	Symphony No. 3 Organ	Op. 78	1886	C minor	35
3	Beethoven	Symphony No. 6 Pastoral	Op. 68	1808	F major	45
2	Beethoven	Symphony No. 9 Choral	Op. 125	1824	D minor	67
1	Dvořák	Symphony No. 9 From the New World	Op. 95, B. 178	1893	E minor	43

== Programming ==
For more details about the works broadcast, see ABC Classic FM's programming notes:

- Day 1: Numbers 100 to 86
- Day 2: Numbers 85 to 71
- Day 3: Numbers 70 to 58
- Day 4: Numbers 57 to 47
- Day 5: Numbers 46 to 34
- Day 6: Numbers 33 to 23
- Day 7: Numbers 22 to 13
- Day 8: Numbers 12 to 1 (including a live concert featuring symphonies 5 to 1)

Only one movement from symphonies 5 to 2 was played during the live concert on day 8 (all other works were played in their entirety).

The complete performances of symphonies 5 to 2 were played on the day following the conclusion of the countdown (see here for programming details).

The countdown contained approximately 72 hours and 35 minutes of music (this total includes works 2 to 5 played in their entirety).

== By composer ==
The following 32 composers were featured in the Classic 100 Symphony countdown:

Composer	Symphonies
Beethoven	8
Berlioz	2
Bizet	1
Borodin	1
Bračanin, Philip	1
Brahms	4
Bruckner	4
Dvořák	5
Edwards, Ross	1
Elgar	2
Franck	1
Glass	1
Górecki	1
Haydn	5
Mahler	9
Mendelssohn	4
Messiaen	1
Mozart	8
Nielsen	2
O'Boyle, Sean	1
Prokofiev	2
Rachmaninoff	4
Schubert	3
Saint-Saëns	1
Schumann	2
Shostakovich	5
Sibelius	7
Strauss, Richard	1
Stravinsky	1
Tchaikovsky	6
Walton	1
Vaughan Williams	5

== See also ==
- Classic 100 Countdowns
