= Manfred Symphony =

Symphony by Pyotr Ilyich Tchaikovsky

- by Tchaikovsky
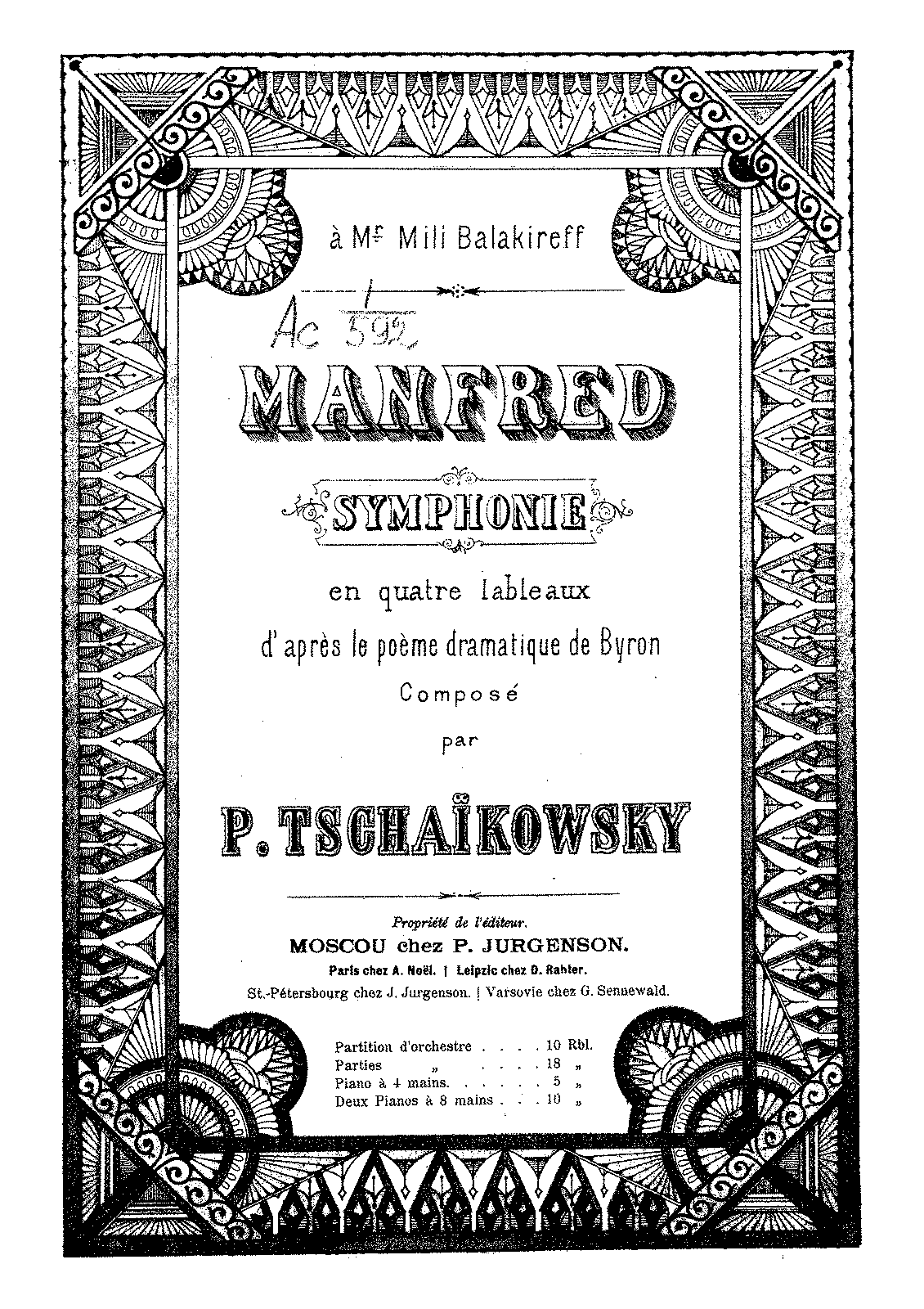
- First edition cover-page.
- Key: B minor
- Opus: 58
- Based on: Manfred
- Composed: 1885
- Published: 1886
- Movements: 4

Premiere
- Date: March 23, 1886
- Location: Moscow

Manfred is a "Symphony in Four Scenes" in B minor by Pyotr Ilyich Tchaikovsky, his Opus 58, but unnumbered. It was written between May and September 1885 to a program based upon the 1817 poem of the same name by Byron, coming after the composer's Fourth Symphony and before his Fifth.

Like the fantasy-overture Romeo and Juliet, Tchaikovsky wrote Manfred at the behest of the nationalist composer Mily Balakirev, who provided him the program, which has a long history. Critic Vladimir Stasov had written it and sent it to Balakirev in 1868 hoping the latter would write such a symphony. But Balakirev felt unable to carry out the project and instead at first forwarded the program to French composer Hector Berlioz, whose programmatic works impressed him. Berlioz in turn declined the project claiming old age and ill health and returned the program, after which it had remained with Balakirev until he reestablished contact with Tchaikovsky in the early 1880s.

Manfred is the only programmatic symphonic work by Tchaikovsky in more than one movement and is larger than any of his numbered symphonies both in length and instrumentation. He initially considered the work one of his best, and in a typical reversal of opinion later considered destroying all but the opening movement. The symphony was greeted with mixed reviews, some finding much to laud in it, and others feeling that its programmatic aspects only weakened it. Manfred remained rarely performed for many years, due to its length and complexity. It has been recorded with increasing frequency but is still seldom heard in the concert hall.

== History ==
In the first ten years after graduating from the Saint Petersburg Conservatory in 1865, Tchaikovsky completed three symphonies. After that he started five more symphony projects, four of which led to a completed symphony premiered during the composer's lifetime.

Later symphonies by Tchaikovsky
Work	Op.	Composed	Premiered
Symphony No. 4	36	1877–1878	1878 (Moscow)
Manfred Symphony	58	1885	1886 (Moscow)
Symphony No. 5	64	1888	1888 (St Petersburg)
Symphony in E-flat	79 posth.	1892	(sketch, not publicly performed during the composer's lifetime)
Symphony No. 6	74	1893	1893 (St Petersburg)

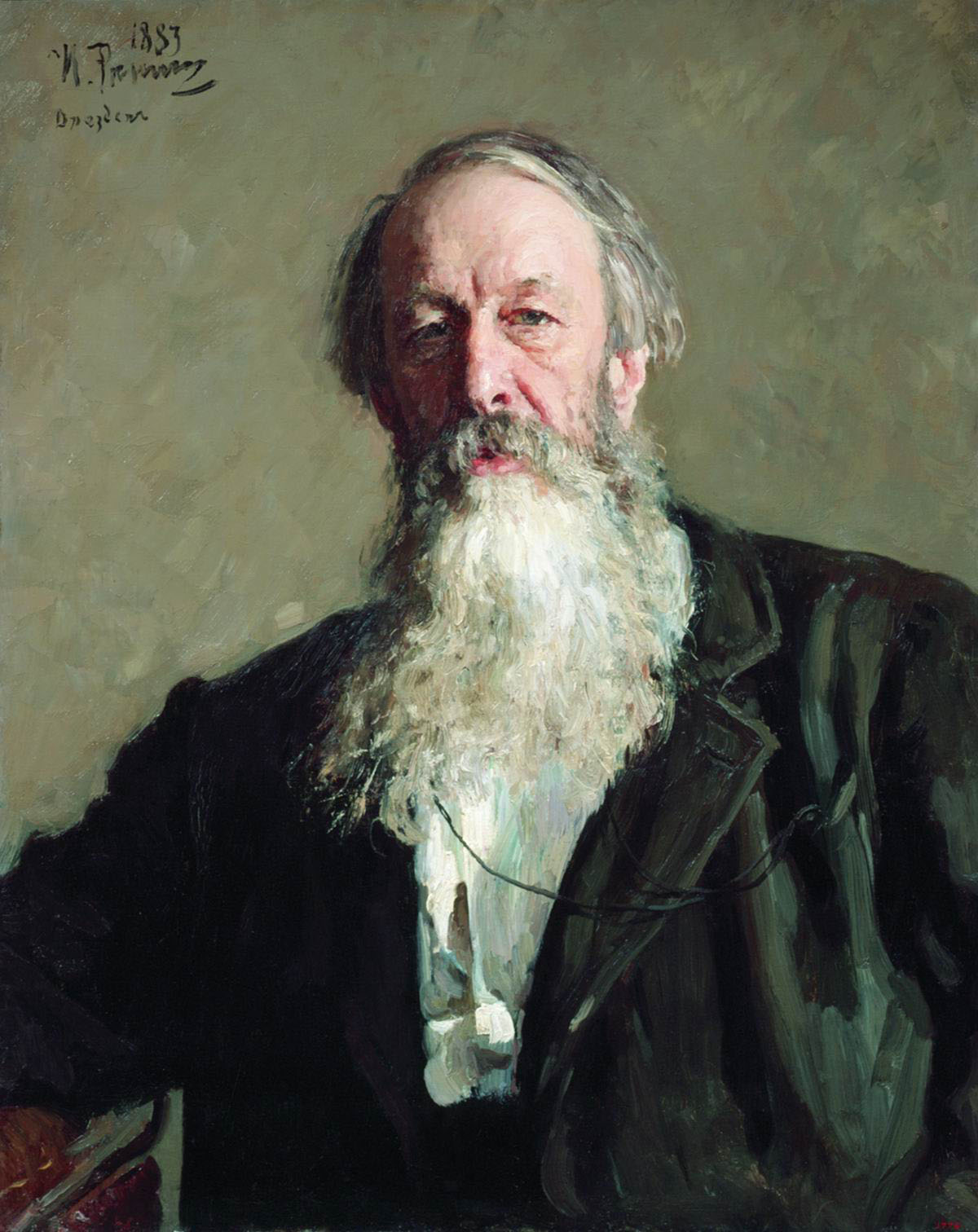
Vladimir Stasov's portrait by Ilya Repin. Stasov initially wrote the program for Manfred for Hector Berlioz to use.

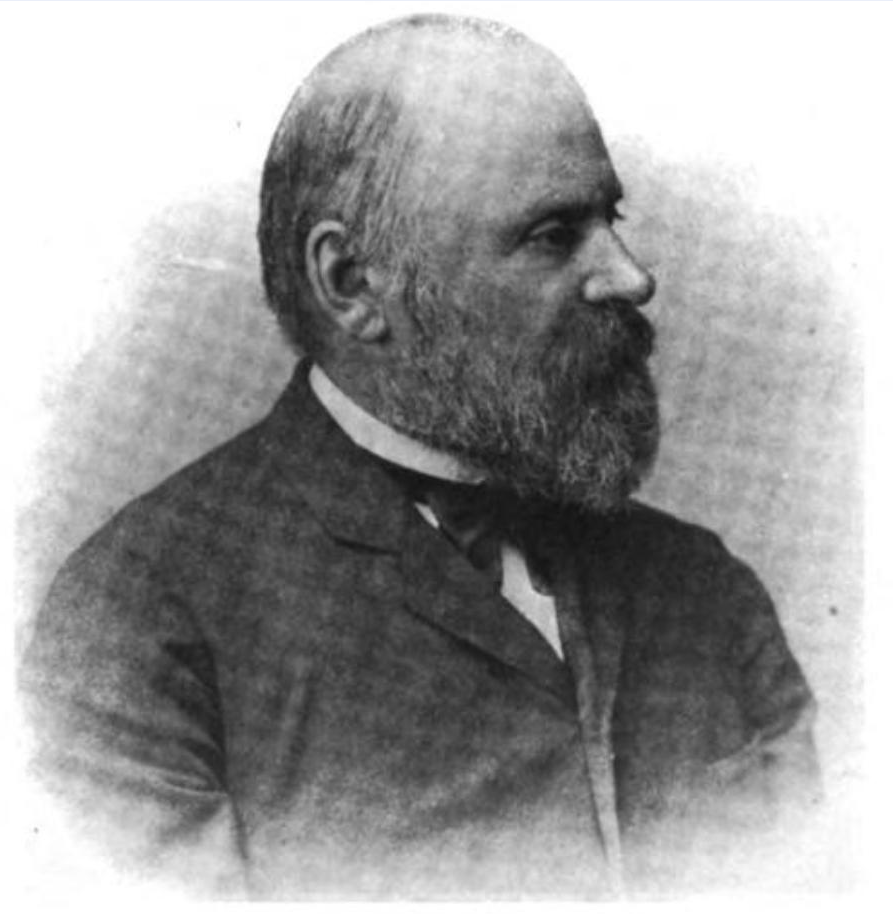
Mily Balakirev encouraged Tchaikovsky to write the Manfred Symphony.

During his second and final trip to Russia in the winter of 1867–68, the French composer Hector Berlioz conducted his program symphony Harold en Italie. The work caused a considerable stir. Its subject was very much to the tastes of its audiences, whose enthusiasm for the works of Lord Byron had not exhausted itself as it had begun to do in Europe. Berlioz's use of a four-movement structure for writing program music intrigued many Russian musicians. One immediate consequence was Nikolai Rimsky-Korsakov's four movement suite Antar, written in 1868. Around the same time as Rimsky-Korsakov composed Antar, critic Vladimir Stasov wrote a scenario for a sequel to Harold, this time based on Byron's poem Manfred and sent it to the nationalist composer Mily Balakirev. Balakirev did not feel attracted to the idea, so he forwarded the program to Berlioz, only hinting it was not entirely his own. Berlioz declined, claiming old age and ill health. He returned the program to Balakirev, who kept it. A little over a year later, Berlioz had died, and by 1872 Balakirev was embroiled in a personal crisis that silenced him creatively.

Tchaikovsky's entrance into this story was strictly by circumstance. He finished his final revision of his fantasy-overture Romeo and Juliet in 1880, a work on which he and Balakirev had worked tirelessly together a decade earlier, and which was dedicated to Balakirev. Since Balakirev had dropped away from the music scene in the intervening time, Tchaikovsky asked the publisher Bessel to send a copy of the printed score to Balakirev, thinking he would have a current address. Whether the publisher delayed in fulfilling this request or Balakirev did not reply, no news was forthcoming as to whether Balakirev had received the score, so Tchaikovsky wrote to Balakirev in September 1881. Balakirev wrote back, thanking Tchaikovsky profusely for the score. In the same letter, Balakirev suggested another project—"the programme for another symphony ... which you could handle superbly." He presented Stasov's detailed plan, explaining it was not in his character to engage in such composition. As he explained in a letter to Tchaikovsky in October 1882, "this magnificent subject is unsuitable, it doesn't harmonise with my inner frame of mind". When Tchaikovsky showed polite interest, Balakirev sent a copy of Stasov's program, which he had amended with suggested key signatures for each movement and representative works which Tchaikovsky had already written to give some idea of what Balakirev had in mind. Balakirev also gave warning to avoid "vulgarities in the manner of German fanfares and Jägermusik," plus instructions about the layout of the flute and percussion parts.

Tchaikovsky declined the project at first. He claimed the subject left him cold and seemed too close to Berlioz's work for him to manage anything but a piece that would lack inspiration and originality. Balakirev persisted. "You must, of course, make an effort," he exhorted, "take a more self-critical approach, don't hurry things." His importunity finally changed Tchaikovsky's mind—after two years of effort. So did Tchaikovsky's rereading Manfred for himself while tending to his friend Iosif Kotek in Davos, Switzerland, nestled in the same Alps in which the poem was set. Once he returned home, Tchaikovsky revised the draft Balakirev had made from Stasov's programme and began sketching the first movement.

Tchaikovsky may have found a subject in Manfred for which he could comfortably compose. However, there was a difference between placing a personal program into a symphony and writing such a work in a literary program. He wrote to his friend and former student Sergei Taneyev, "Composing a program symphony, I have the sensation of being a charlatan and cheating the public; I am paying them not hard cash but rubbishy bits of paper money." However, he later wrote to Emilia Pavlovskaya, "The symphony has turned out to be huge, serious, difficult, absorbing all my time, sometimes to utter exhaustion; but an inner voice tells me that my labor is not in vain and that this work will perhaps be the best of my symphonic works."

Instead of following Balakirev's instructions slavishly, Tchaikovsky wrote it in his own style. Initially, he considered it to be one of his best compositions, but wanted a few years later to destroy the score, though that intention was never carried out.

The Manfred Symphony was first performed in Moscow on 23 March 1886, with Max Erdmannsdörfer as conductor. It is dedicated to Balakirev.

== Key signatures ==
Below are the key signatures Balakirev initially envisioned for Manfred, what he later suggested, and what Tchaikovsky eventually used in the symphony:

Balakirev (1882)

1. F♯ minor
  second subject in D major
2. A major (slow movement)
3. D major (scherzo)
4. F♯ minor
  appearance of Astarte in D♭

Balakirev (1884)

1. B♭ minor
  second subject in D major
2. G♭ major (slow movement)
3. D major (scherzo)
4. B♭ minor
  appearance of Astarte in D♭)
  coda in B♭ major

Tchaikovsky (1885)

1. Tonally ambiguous
  (only establishing B minor more than halfway through the movement)
  second subject in D major
2. B minor → D major → B minor (scherzo)
3. G major (slow movement)
4. B minor
  appearance of Astarte in D♭
  coda in B major

== Form ==
There are four movements:

1. Lento lugubre (B minor)
2. Vivace con spirito (B minor)
3. Andante con moto (G major)
4. Allegro con fuoco (B minor → D♭ major → B major)

=== I. Lento lugubre ===
Manfred wanders in the Alps. Weary of the fatal question of existence, tormented by hopeless longings and the memory of past crimes, he suffers cruel spiritual pangs. He has plunged into occult sciences and commands the mighty powers of darkness, but neither they nor anything in this world can give him with the forgetfulness to which alone he vainly aspires. The memory of the lost Astarte, once passionately loved, gnaws his heart and there is neither limit nor end to Manfred's despair.

The musical embodiment of this program note is presented in five extensive musical slabs spaced out by four silences. A brooding first theme, briefly unharmonized, builds to music both spacious and monolithic. A second theme leads to a second musical slab, this time pushing forward with the loudest climax Tchaikovsky ever wrote. The music in the third slab seems calmer, while the fourth slab marks the appearance of Astarte. The fifth slab culminates in a frantic climax and a series of abrupt, final chords.

=== II. Vivace con spirito ===
The Alpine fairy appears before Manfred in the rainbow from the spray of a waterfall.

Tchaikovsky's efforts in exploring fresh possibilities in scoring allowed him to present his music with new colors and more refined contrasts. In this scherzo, it seems as though the orchestration creates the music, as though Tchaikovsky has thought directly in colors and textures, making these the primary focus. Put simply, there is no tune and little definition of any harmonic base, creating a world alluring, fragile and magical. The point becomes clear when an actual and lyrical tune enters the central section of the movement.

=== III. Andante con moto ===
A picture of the bare, simple, free life of the mountain folk.

This pastorale opens with a siciliana, then the three-note call of a hunter. The opening theme returns. We hear a brief and lively peasant dance, then an agitated outburst, before the opening theme returns. The opening pastoral theme eventually returns more spaciously and in a fuller, more decorative scoring. The hunter sounds his horn; the music fades.

=== IV. Allegro con fuoco ===
The subterranean palace of Arimanes. Infernal orgy. Appearance of Manfred in the middle of the bacchanal. Evocation and appearance of the shade of Astarte. He is pardoned. Death of Manfred.

Many critics consider the finale to be fatally flawed, but the problem lies less with music than with the program. Up to this point Tchaikovsky has done well at reconciling the extramusical requirements for each movement with the music itself. Now, however, the program takes over, beginning with a fugue, which is by its nature academic and undramatic, to depict the horde's discovery of Manfred within their midst. The result, though in many ways becoming a condensed recapitulation of the latter half of the first movement, becomes a fragmented movement with musical disruption and non-sequiturs, ending with the Germanic chorale depicting Manfred's death scene.

== Instrumentation ==
The symphony is scored for an orchestra with the following instruments.

Woodwinds

3 flutes (3rd doubling piccolo)
2 oboes
1 cor anglais
2 clarinets in A, B♭
bass clarinet
3 bassoons (3rd doubling contrabassoon in some performances)

Brass

4 horns
2 cornets
2 trumpets
3 trombones
tuba

Percussion

timpani
bass drum
cymbals
tam-tam
triangle
tambourine
bells

Keyboards

harmonium (usually played on organ) featured in the climactic coda of the finale

Strings

violins I & II
violas
cellos
double basses
2 harps

== Analysis ==
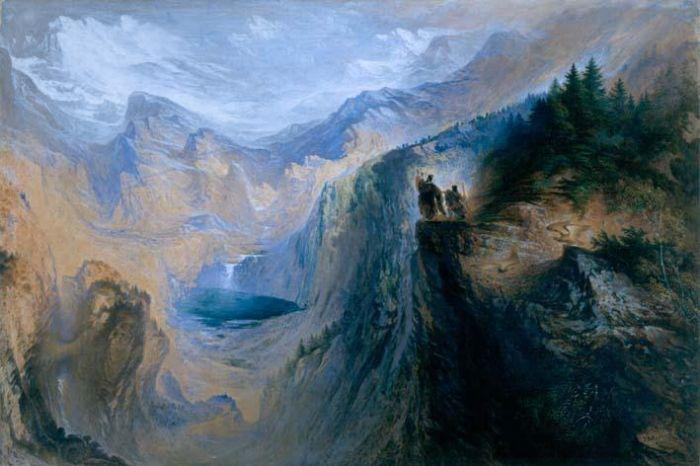
Manfred on the Jungfrau (1837) by John Martin.

Several features make Manfred unique among Tchaikovsky's works. It is the only programmatic work he wrote in more than one movement. The first two movements do not recapitulate their middle sections. The entire work is not only long, playing up to and sometimes over an hour, but it is designed with the utmost spaciousness in mind. There is nothing else in Tchaikovsky's works that captures the long-breathed deliberation of the third movement or the practically verbatim recapitulation of the widely variegated opening section of the second movement following the equally huge middle section. At least one critic has suggested that, in its heroic but perfectly judged dimensions, Manfred resembles Richard Strauss's later tone poem Ein Heldenleben.

Musicologist John Warrack suggests that, of all Tchaikovsky's major neglected works, Manfred may be the one which least deserves this fate. He apparently felt such an impulse—if not from Byron's poem, then from the program Balakirev gave him—and that impulse brought forth a work of great originality and power. While he did not follow Berlioz in how he might have handled the program, Tchaikovsky did make use of an idée fixe recurring in all four movements. He also followed a Berliozian design of a lengthy, reflective, melancholy opening movement, two colorful interludes as inner movements, and a finale in which Berlioz' Brigands' Orgy becomes (without any hint from the poem) a bacchanal.

Here again is the description of the first movement from the program:

Manfred wanders in the Alpine mountains. His life is shattered, but he is obsessed with life's unanswerable questions. In life nothing remains for him except memories. Images of his ideal Astarte permeate his thoughts, and he vainly calls to her. Only the echo from the cliffs repeats her name. Memories and thoughts burn and gnaw at him. He seeks and begs for oblivion, which no-one can give him.

It is not hard to see how these carefully selected elements might appeal to Tchaikovsky. Free from having to reconcile the first movement to sonata form, Tchaikovsky constructs his own form which succeeds well as an expression of the program. A massive opening motive associated with Manfred himself expresses both the strength and gloom of his character. This motive returns at crucial parts to identify Manfred's part in the action. Beneath this theme is a musical structure that, while not conforming to the traditional recapitulation of themes in sonata form, succeeds in moving forward without losing unity or degenerating into a series of episodes. It is a musical portrait of the guilty, doomed sensibility, drawn strongly as Berlioz' Harold. This was perhaps the aspect of Byron which appealed most vividly to Russians; it also may have touched closely on Tchaikovsky's own situation.

The two inner movements work as effective structural contrasts to the opening drama. The waterfall in the second movement gives Tchaikovsky the opportunity for one of his longest and most beautifully worked out scherzos, scored with a delicacy that Berlioz might have admired; Tchaikovsky's Alpine experiences might have come in handy here. For the third movement pastorale, Balakirev had hoped for a Russian version of the corresponding movement from the Symphonie fantastique. Tchaikovsky's version is more conventional, with two simple themes—one graceful, the other more roughly rustic. It forms in its static quality an idealized retreat before the turmoil of the finale. The finale reflects Harold en Italie in the exuberance of the revelling. Tchaikovsky manages to add a fugue, a return of Astarte and a death scene at the end.'

Nevertheless, musicologist David Brown considered the finale the weakest part of Manfred, not because of the music itself but of the programme. Up to this point, Brown writes, Tchaikovsky had very successfully reconciled extramusical specifications with musical structure. Now the program takes over, resulting in a fragmented movement with musical disruption and non sequiturs. The fatal flaw is the fugue, which Tchaikovsky wrote to convey the reaction of the hordes of the evil spirit Arimanes to Manfred's appearance amongst them. A fugue, Brown argues, is by nature undramatic in both its fixation on one thematic idea and its measured progress; therefore, it cannot help but sound stodgy, resulting in a misstep from which the music never fully recovers. Musicologist Ralph Wood, in contrast, stated that while the finale may have its faults, there is still much about the music that is quite good.

== Critical views ==
Critics were divided on Manfred from the work's outset. César Cui, the member of the Russian nationalistic music group known as The Five whose reviews of Tchaikovsky's compositions were mostly negative, praised Manfred. Cui commented especially on the "masterly description of Manfred's gloomy, noble image" in the opening movement and the "ravishing refinement" of the scherzo, concluding that "we can only thank [Tchaikovsky] for his new contribution to the treasure-store of our nation's symphonic music." The composer's friend, critic Herman Laroche, was less positive, calling Manfred "among the most raw and unfinished of [Tchaikovsky's] compositions." While admitting the work was "full of melodic warmth and sincerity", Laroche criticized its programmatic aspects, which left "an impression of mystery and uncertainty cribbed from Liszt, though cribbed not in a mechanical fashion but with the addition of some of the technical sequins which cost our deft and resourceful composer so little effort."

Some regard Manfred as one of Tchaikovsky's most brilliant and inspired works; conductor Arturo Toscanini considered it the composer's greatest composition and it was one of only two Tchaikovsky symphonies (the other being the Pathetique) that he ever programmed. His admiration did not stop him from making changes in Manfred's score when he performed and recorded it, including a number of cuts. However, others despise it. According to music critic David Hurwitz, composer-conductor Leonard Bernstein referred to it as "trash" and never recorded it.

Some critics have commented that, for all Tchaikovsky's distrust of program music and Manfred's kinship to a Berlioz work he did not wish to repeat, the symphony proves its composer's capacity to infuse another composer's example with his own personality, provided the emotional nature of the work found a response in him. These critics have called Manfred one of the great program symphonies of the 19th century.

The Manfred Symphony was voted number 75 in the ABC Classic FM Top 100 Symphony Countdown in 2009.

== Recordings ==
The symphony has been recorded many times, with recordings made by major orchestras and conductors. Conductors who have recorded the work include Arturo Toscanini, Mstislav Rostropovich, Lorin Maazel, Eugene Goossens, André Previn, Bernard Haitink, Eugene Ormandy, Yuri Temirkanov, Paul Kletzki, Constantin Silvestri, Yevgeny Svetlanov (three recordings), Riccardo Muti, Sir Neville Marriner, Igor Markevitch, Yuri Ahronovitch, Andrew Litton, Mikhail Pletnev (twice), Vladimir Fedoseyev, Riccardo Chailly, Mariss Jansons, Vasily Petrenko, Zubin Mehta, Vladimir Jurowski, Vladimir Ashkenazy, Kurt Masur and others.

In the second and third of Svetlanov's accounts, a 1989 live concert with the Berliner Philharmoniker and a 1992 concert in Tokyo with the Russian Federation State Orchestra, he replaces the closing pages of the finale with a reprise of the coda of the first movement. It creates a more triumphal conclusion, and has occasionally been repeated in concert, but was never in any score left by Tchaikovsky.

== Bibliography ==
- Brown, David, Tchaikovsky: The Years of Wandering, 1878–1885, (New York: W.W. Norton & Company, 1986). ISBN 0-393-02311-7.
- Brown, David, Tchaikovsky: The Man and His Music (New York: Pegasus Books, 2007). ISBN 0-571-23194-2.
- Cui, César, "Tchaikovsky's Manfred Symphony." In Russians on Russian Music, 1880–1917 (Cambridge and New York: Cambridge University Press, 2003), ed. Stuart Campbell. ISBN 0-521-59097-3.
- Holden, Anthony, Tchaikovsky: A Biography (New York: Random House, 1995). ISBN 0-679-42006-1.
- Laroche, Hermann, "The concert on 11 August at Pavlovsk, Tchaikovsky's Manfred and Hamlet." In Russians on Russian Music, 1880–1917 (Cambridge and New York: Cambridge University Press, 2003), ed. Stuart Campbell. ISBN 0-521-59097-3.
- Warrack, John, Tchaikovsky (New York: Charles Scribner's Sonss, 1973). ISBN 0-684-13558-2.
- Wood, Ralph W., "Miscellaneous Orchestral Works." In Music of Tchaikovsky (New York, W. W. Norton & Company, 1946), ed. Gerald Abraham. ISBN n/a.
