= Symphony No. 5 (Tchaikovsky) =

Symphony by Pyotr Ilyich Tchaikovsky

- in E Minor
- by Pyotr Ilyich Tchaikovsky
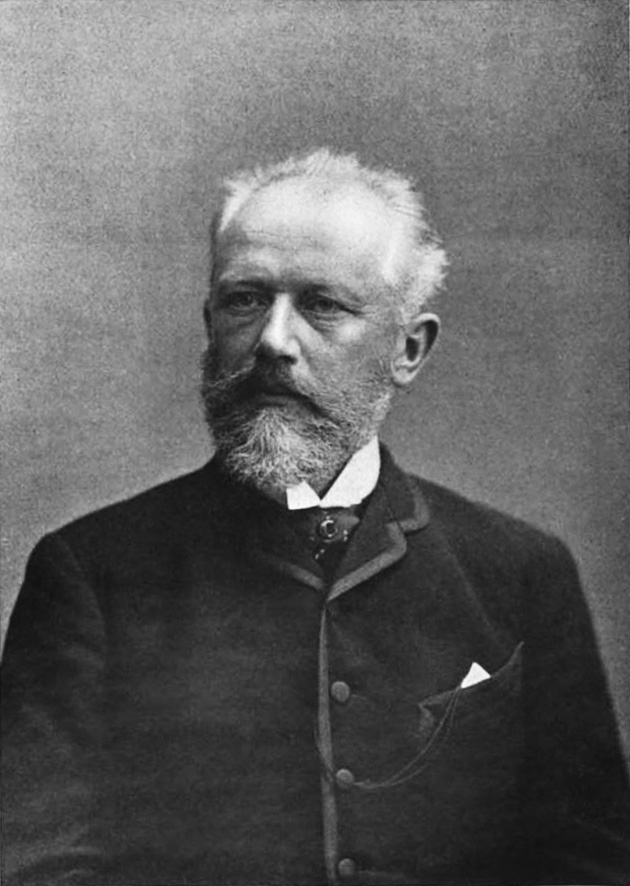
- Tchaikovsky in 1887
- Key: E minor
- Opus: 64
- Composed: 1888
- Dedication: Theodor Avé-Lallemant
- Movements: Four

Premiere
- Date: 17th November 1888
- Location: Mariinsky Theatre, Saint Petersburg
- Conductor: Pyotr Ilyich Tchaikovsky

The Symphony No. 5 in E minor, Op. 64 is a symphony composed by Pyotr Ilyich Tchaikovsky between May and August 1888, and is one of Tchaikovsky's most celebrated works. The symphony is one of many pieces (by him and other composers) that depict and contemplate fate using a musical motif that repeats throughout the work. It was first performed in Saint Petersburg at the Mariinsky Theatre on November 17th with Tchaikovsky conducting.

== Place among Tchaikovsky's later symphonies ==
In the first ten years after graduating from the Saint Petersburg Conservatory in 1865 Tchaikovsky completed three symphonies. After that he started five more symphony projects, four of which led to a completed symphony premiered during the composer's lifetime.

Later symphonies by Tchaikovsky
Work	Op.	Composed	Premiered
Symphony No. 4	36	1877–1878	1878 (Moscow)
Manfred Symphony	58	1885	1886 (Moscow)
Symphony No. 5	64	1888	1888 (St Petersburg)
Symphony in E♭	79 posth.	1892	(sketch, not publicly performed during the composer's lifetime)
Symphony No. 6	74	1893	1893 (St Petersburg)

The fifth symphony was composed in 1888, between the Manfred Symphony of 1885 and the sketches for a Symphony in E♭, which were abandoned in 1892 (apart from recuperating material from its first movement for an Allegro Brillante for piano and orchestra a year later). As for the numbered symphonies, Tchaikovsky's Symphony No. 5 was composed between Symphony No. 4, which had been completed ten years earlier, and Symphony No. 6, composed five years later, in the year of the composer's death.

=== Programme ===
On 15 April 1888, about a month before he started to compose the symphony, Tchaikovsky sketched notes on the symphony in his notebook, saying it is a "total submission before fate, or [...] the inscrutable designs of providence." Possibly referring to the first movement, he wrote: "Murmurs, doubts, laments, reproaches against... xxx (Note: These x's may be referring to a particular person, or referring directly to Tchaikovsky's homosexuality, as he often did in his diary, calling it 'Z' or 'THAT'.)" and on the second: "Shall I cast myself into the embrace of faith???" In sketches for the second movement, there appear to be notes written around the score; in the treble clef is written: 'consolation,' 'a ray of light,' and 'below the reply: "No, there is no hope."' (Note: The phrase 'below...hope' may be referring to a different motif in the bass clef at the same point of the score.) However, most of these sketches were rejected, and it is uncertain how much of this programme has been realised in the composition, as it is possible that some of the notes made were transferred from the fifth symphony to the Symphony in E♭ major.

=== Cyclical structure ===
Like the Symphony No. 4, No. 5 is a cyclical symphony, with a recurring main theme. Unlike No. 4, however, the theme is heard in all four movements, a feature Tchaikovsky had first used in the Manfred Symphony, which was completed less than three years before No. 5.

== Music ==
The work is scored for 3 flutes (3rd doubling piccolo), 2 oboes, 2 clarinets in A, 2 bassoons, 4 horns in F, 2 trumpets in A, 3 trombones, tuba, timpani (3 drums), and strings.

The symphony is in four movements:

1. Andante – Allegro con anima (E minor) – Molto più tranquillo (D major – E major)
2. Andante cantabile, con alcuna licenza (B minor – D major)
3. Valse. Allegro moderato (A major) (Trio in F♯ minor)
4. Finale: Andante maestoso (E major) – Allegro vivace (E minor) – Meno mosso (E major)

The symphony displays an overall tonal trajectory of E minor to E major, which—going from a minor key to its parallel major—is a common tonal trajectory in Western classical music, most notably used by Ludwig van Beethoven in his Fifth Symphony. The first movement ends in the minor mode, which allows the narrative to continue through the rest of the symphony:

E minor (1st mvt) → B minor → E minor →
D major (2nd mvt) → F♯ major → D major → F♯ minor → V^{7} (V^{4}_{2}) of D major → D major → G♯^{o}^{7} → D major →
A major (3rd mvt) → F♯ minor → A major →
E major (4th mvt) → E minor → D major → C major → E minor → F♯ major → E minor → E major (Note: These modulations are mostly not an introduction of a new key per se, but are used mainly as 'transitional' modulations.)

The recurring main theme is used as a device to unify the four movements of the symphony. This motto theme, sometimes dubbed the "fate theme" or "fate motif", has a funereal character in the first movement, but gradually transforms into a triumphant march, which dominates the final movement.

A typical performance of the symphony lasts somewhat less than 50 minutes.

I. Andante – Allegro con anima
Performed by the Berlin Philharmonic under Ferenc Fricsay, 1949

=== I. Andante – Allegro con anima – Molto più tranquillo ===
Motto Theme, mm. 1–4:

Primary Theme 1 (PT1), mm. 42–50:

Primary Theme 2 (PT2), mm. 116–128:

Subordinate Theme (ST), mm. 170–182:

Motive X, mm.154–170:

In the exposition of the first movement, the initial tonality (E minor) is relatively unstable. A tonality of D major slips in and out E minor as the dominant of the relative major (G major), but not until mm. 128–132 does one hear this as an antagonistic to E minor. The exposition concludes in D major after integrating part of the PT1 into its cadential moment (mm. 194–198), of a perfect authentic cadence in D major. Motive X frames the secondary theme group by preceding the ST and reiterating D major afterwards.

The development consists of four distinct sections. The first section exhibits a sequence based on the PT1 superimposed with motive X. This is accompanied by a bass line that diatonically descends over an octave and a fifth. The second section develops the head motive from PT1. At bar 218 the tonality changes from D major to D minor, its parallel minor. The shifting meter (from 6/8 to 3/4), and diminished sonority (m. 261 for example) adds to growing instability. The third section is a brief allusion to the PT2, interrupted by a fugato based on PT1. Motive X returns strongly and insistently in m. 285, going back and forth between G minor and D minor. This can be interpreted as an effort to re-establish sonority in D. The transition to recapitulation is rather abrupt, yet a use of common tone modulation can be observed.

The recapitulation of this movement follows the convention of sonata form, with the coda using the primary theme material to conclude the movement.

=== II. Andante cantabile, con alcuna licenza ===
The second movement begins with the continuation of the tragic sonority in B minor, as if the movement will be in the minor dominant of the tonic of the symphony. Instead, a common chord modulation leads to a D major theme first introduced by a solo horn. This solo is commonly asked for in professional horn auditions and is one of the most important orchestral excerpts in the repertoire.

II. Andante cantabile, con alcuna licenza
Performed by the Berlin Philharmonic under Ferenc Fricsay, 1949

Theme A1 (1st horn):

Theme A2 (oboe/horn):

Theme B (clarinet in A):

This movement is in a standard ternary form with the A section in D major, the B section alluding to F♯ minor, then a restatement of the A section with different orchestration. Compared to the stable A section, the B section exhibits instability in many ways. For example, the theme begins and remains in V^{7} of F♯ minor, even though it could be easily resolved to F♯ minor. Moreover, the segmentation of a theme and use of hyper meter and stretto contributes to the instability of this section.

The second movement is often recoginsed by its famous horn solo of theme A1: the opening melody of the movement (bar 8 upbeat). Marked dolce con molto espress (Note: Espress is sometimes labelled as the full word espressione, meaning 'expression'), the melody is praised for its romanticism and lyricism, requiring musicality, expression, and control of dynamics from the performer.

In this movement, the motto theme appears twice: from mm. 99–103 as a structural dominant preparing the return of the A section, and in the coda (mm. 158–166) in G♯^{7}. One could interpret this as a preparation for I^{6}, but also as a structural leading tone to the next movement (G♯^{7} → A), especially since the unwinding from the climactic restatement of the motto theme occurs relatively hesitantly and what follows seems to diminish away.

=== III. Valse. Allegro moderato ===
Waltz 1:

III. Valse. Allegro moderato
Performed by the Berlin Philharmonic under Ferenc Fricsay, 1949

Waltz 2 (ob 1):

Waltz 3:

Trio:

The third movement is a waltz, with some unusual elements, for example, hemiola and unbalanced phrase structure at the outset of the movement. These elements take over the movement in the trio section, which is a scherzo. The scherzo theme initially played by the first violins can be seen as a superimposition of 4/4 over 3/4. Hemiola is used again as a transitional technique (mm. 97–105). The waltz returns, but with the texture from the scherzo.

The return of the motto theme in the third movement, preceded by a waltz in a major mode, recalls the opening of the symphony, but with a hemiola element:

The movement ends with the texture shrinking until only pianissimo strings play a repeated cadence, which then quickens into a hemiola rhythm before six sudden fortissimo chords played by the whole orchestra.

=== IV. Finale: Andante maestoso – Allegro vivace – Meno mosso ===
Introduction – Motto Theme:

IV. Finale. Andante maestoso – Allegro vivace
Performed by the Berlin Philharmonic under Ferenc Fricsay, 1949

PT1 (violin I):

PT2:

ST:

The exposition of the last movement begins in E minor, whilst the D major sonority seeks to establish itself. Unlike the first movement, there is an early statement in D major, as well as in the V^{7} of D major (mm. 86–90, 106–114). A passage of key oppositions, increasing harmonic rhythm, segmentation, and rapid changes of themes culminates at m. 172 with the re-introduction of the motto theme in C major.

The development is very brief, lasting about 60 measures. In the recapitulation, a new melody is superimposed over the texture, but never returns.

The sixth statement of the motto theme is in E minor, leading to an emphatic perfect authentic cadence in B major. Following this, the coda succeeds in reemphasizing the tonic, using different themes and many cadences in the tonic. Some of the themes used here are the motto theme (m. 474), the countermelody to PT1 (m. 474, superimposed onto the motto theme), PT2 (m. 504), and PT1 from the first movement of the symphony. The climax uses several scalic passages and tremolos in the strings, as well as offbeat notes played to create fourth species counterpoint. The symphony ends with a triumphant march in E Major with the trumpets and horns exchanging the melody:

== Critical reaction ==
Tchaikovsky himself considered the ending overdone and excessive, rather than an expression of triumph over fate. After the second performance, Tchaikovsky wrote: "I have come to the conclusion that it is a failure". Despite this, the symphony has gone on to become one of the composer's most popular works. Tchaikovsky, despite his friends' approval and appraisal of the symphony, remained distraught and had significant self-doubt:

My new symphony was played twice in Saint Petersburg and once in Prague. I am convinced that this symphony is not a success. There is something so repellent about such excess, insincerity and artificiality.

With each day that passes I am increasingly certain that my last symphony is not a successful work, and the realisation that it is unsuccessful—or perhaps that my powers are declining—is very distressing to me. The symphony is too colourful, massive, insincere, drawn out and on the whole very disagreeable [...] Am I indeed, as they say, written out? [...] If so, then this is terrible. Whether my misgivings are mistaken or not, regrettably I have concluded that the symphony written in 1888 is poorer than the one written in 1877.

Possibly for its very clear exposition of the idea of "ultimate victory through strife", the Fifth was very popular during World War II, with many new recordings of the work, and many performances during those years. One of the most notable performances was by the Leningrad Radio Orchestra during the Siege of Leningrad. City leaders had ordered the orchestra to continue its performances to keep the spirits high in the city. On the night of October 20, 1941 they played Tchaikovsky's Symphony No. 5 at the city's Philharmonic Hall and it was broadcast live to London. As the second movement began, bombs started to fall nearby, but the orchestra continued playing until the final note. Since the war it has remained very popular, but has been somewhat eclipsed in popularity by the Fourth and Sixth Symphonies.

Critical reaction to the work was mixed, with some enthusiasm in Russia. Valerian Bogdanov-Berezovsky wrote, "The Fifth Symphony is the weakest of Tchaikovsky's symphonies, but nevertheless it is a striking work, taking a prominent place not only among the composer's output but among Russian works in general. [...] the entire symphony seems to spring from some dark spiritual experience."

On the symphony's first performance in the United States, critical reaction, especially in Boston, was almost unanimously hostile. A reviewer for the Boston Evening Transcript, October 24, 1892, wrote:

Of the Fifth Tchaikovsky Symphony one hardly knows what to say [...] In the Finale we have all the untamed fury of the Cossack, whetting itself for deeds of atrocity, against all the sterility of the Russian steppes. The furious peroration sounds like nothing so much as a horde of demons struggling in a torrent of brandy, the music growing drunker and drunker. Pandemonium, delirium tremens, raving, and above all, noise worse confounded!

The reception in New York City was little better. A reviewer for the Musical Courier, March 13, 1889, wrote:

In the Tchaikovsky's Fifth Symphony [...] one vainly sought for coherency and homogeneousness [...] In the last movement, the composer's Calmuck blood got the better of him, and slaughter, dire and bloody, swept across the storm-driven score.

== Uses of the symphony ==
"Farewell, Amanda", written by Cole Porter for the 1949 Spencer Tracy and Katharine Hepburn film Adam's Rib, draws liberally from the 4th movement of Tchaikovsky's 5th Symphony.

It is suggested by Ian MacDonald that a fragment of the "fate" theme is quoted by Dmitri Shostakovich in his Symphony No. 7 in the "invasion" theme of the first movement.

Part of the second movement was given English lyrics under the title "Moon Love" (a Frank Sinatra classic later featured in his 1966 album Moonlight Sinatra) and Love Is All That Matters.

The beginning of "Annie's Song" by John Denver is almost identical to the first horn theme in the second movement, but it seems this was unintentional and only pointed out to Denver by his producer Milt Okun.

An arrangement of the second movement was used in a prominent 1970s Australian advertisement for Winfield cigarettes.

== Notable recordings ==
- Concertgebouworkest, Willem Mengelberg (1929)
- Leningrad Philharmonic Orchestra, Yevgeny Mravinsky (Deutsche Gramophone, 1960)
- New York Philharmonic, Leonard Bernstein (CBS, 1960)
- London Symphony Orchestra, Igor Markevitch (Philips, 1966)
- London Philharmonic Orchestra, Mstislav Rostropovich (1977, EMI)
- Oslo Philharmonic, Mariss Jansons (Chandos, 1986)
- Vienna Philharmonic, Valery Gergiev (Philips, 1998)
- London Philharmonic Orchestra, Vladimir Jurowski (LPO, 2012)
- Frankfurt Radio Symphony, Manfred Honeck (YouTube, 2018)
- Concertgebouworkest, Semyon Bychkov (YouTube, 2020)
