= Bernard Haitink =

Dutch conductor (1929–2021)

Bernard Haitink CH KBE
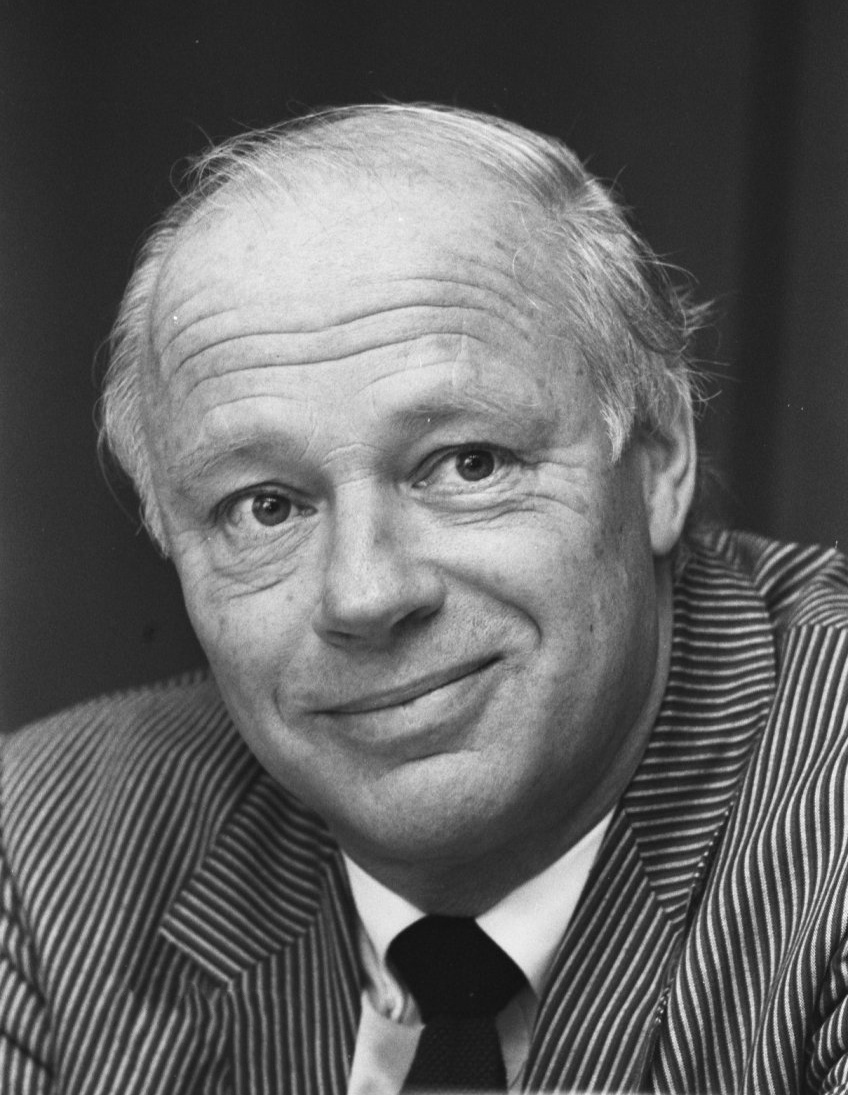
- Haitink in 1984
- Born: Bernard Johan Herman Haitink; 4 March 1929; Amsterdam, Netherlands
- Died: 21 October 2021 (aged 92); London, England
- Occupations: Conductor; classical violinist
- Organizations: Royal Concertgebouw Orchestra; London Philharmonic Orchestra; Glyndebourne Opera; Staatskapelle Dresden; Chicago Symphony Orchestra
- Awards: Ordre des Arts et des Lettres; Honorary Member of the Order of the Companions of Honour; Order of the Netherlands Lion; Grammy Awards; Gramophone Award

Bernard Johan Herman Haitink (Dutch: [ˈbɛrnɑrt ˈɦaːitɪŋk]; 4 March 1929 – 21 October 2021) was a Dutch conductor and violinist. He was the principal conductor of several international orchestras, beginning with the Royal Concertgebouw Orchestra in 1961. He moved to London, as principal conductor of the London Philharmonic Orchestra from 1967 to 1979, music director at Glyndebourne Opera from 1978 to 1988 and of the Royal Opera House from 1987 to 2002, when he became principal conductor of the Staatskapelle Dresden. Finally, he was principal conductor of the Chicago Symphony Orchestra from 2006 to 2010. The focus of his prolific recording was classical symphonies and orchestral works, but he also conducted operas. He conducted 90 concerts at The Proms in London, the last on 3 September 2019 with the Vienna Philharmonic. His awards include Grammy Awards and the 2015 Gramophone Award for his lifetime achievements.

== Early life ==
Haitink was born on 4 March 1929 in Amsterdam, the son of Willem Haitink, a civil servant who later became director of the Amsterdam electricity board, and Anna Clara (Verschaffelt), who worked for Alliance française. He studied the violin and conducting, with Felix Hupka, who conducted the school's orchestra, at the Conservatorium van Amsterdam. He then played the violin in orchestras before taking courses in conducting under Ferdinand Leitner in 1954 and 1955.

== Career ==
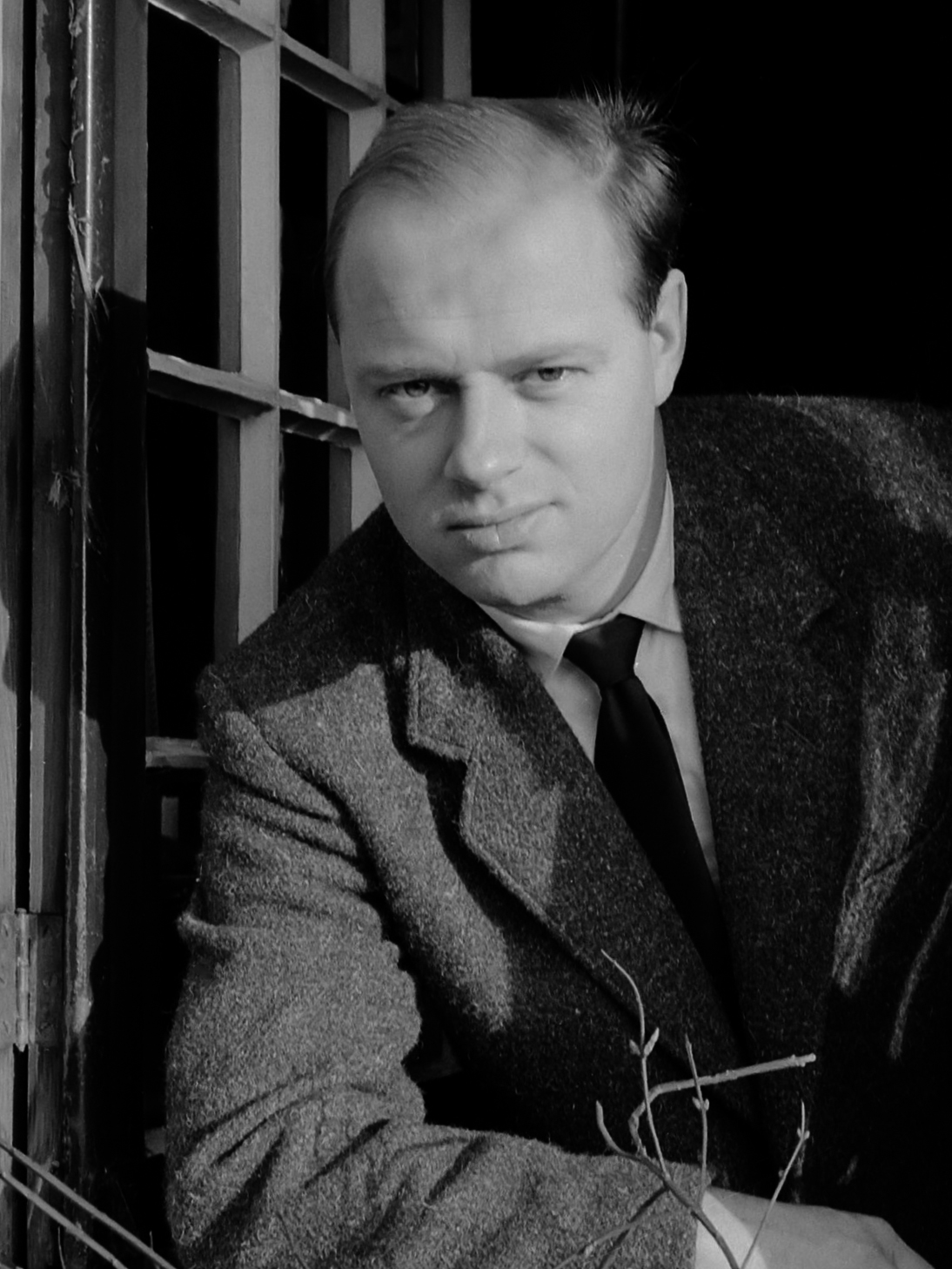
Haitink in 1959

Haitink conducted his first concert on 19 July 1954 with the Netherlands Radio Union Orchestra (later the Netherlands Radio Philharmonic Orchestra [RFO]). He became second conductor of the orchestra in 1955 and chief conductor in 1957. His conducting debut with the Concertgebouw Orchestra was on 7 November 1956, substituting for Carlo Maria Giulini. After the sudden death of Eduard van Beinum, Haitink was named first conductor of the Concertgebouw on 1 September 1959. He became principal conductor in 1961, sharing that position with Eugen Jochum until 1963, when Haitink became sole principal conductor. With the Concertgebouw Orchestra, Haitink made many recordings for the Philips label, and later for Decca and EMI Classics. He toured widely with the orchestra.

In the early 1980s, Haitink threatened to resign his Concertgebouw post in protest at threatened reductions to its subsidy from the Dutch government, which could have led to the dismissal of 23 musicians from the orchestra. The financial situation was eventually settled, and Haitink remained chief conductor until 1988. In 1999, he was named the honorary conductor of the Royal Concertgebouw Orchestra. In December 2012, following his advocacy for the RFO in the wake of proposed budget cuts to the orchestra and Dutch music in general, Haitink accepted the title of patron of the RFO. In March 2014, Haitink told the Dutch newspaper Het Parool that he wished to renounce the title of RCO conductor laureate and to no longer guest-conduct the orchestra in protest of the orchestra's administrative management. In September 2015, the Royal Concertgebouw Orchestra announced a rapprochement with Haitink, with a scheduled guest-conducting engagement with the orchestra in the 2016–17 season.

Haitink was principal conductor of the London Philharmonic Orchestra from 1967 to 1979. He was also music director at Glyndebourne Opera in England from 1978 to 1988. He was music director of the Royal Opera House, Covent Garden, from 1987 to 2002, where his musicianship was praised, though he also received criticism for his degree of attachment to the organisation as a whole.

From 2002 to 2004, Haitink was chief conductor of the Staatskapelle Dresden. His original contract with Dresden ran to 2006, but he resigned in 2004 over disputes with the Staatskapelle's Intendant, Gerd Uecker, over the orchestra's choice of successor.

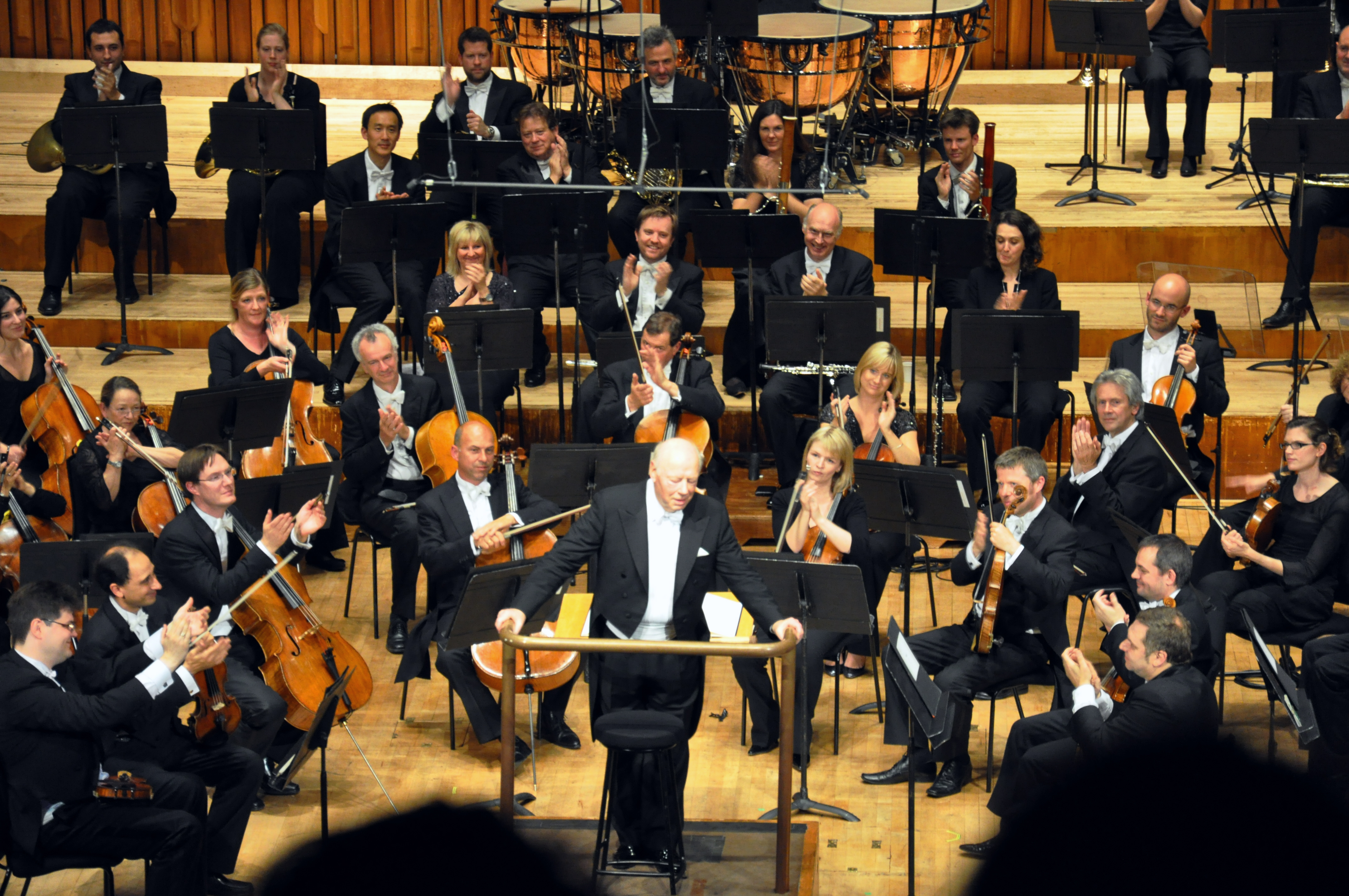
At the Barbican Centre in London with the London Symphony Orchestra, 2011

Haitink was principal guest conductor of the Boston Symphony Orchestra from 1995 to 2004, when he took on the new title of conductor emeritus. In addition, he appeared with l'Orchestre National de France and the London Symphony Orchestra (LSO). In the early 2000s, he recorded the complete Beethoven and Brahms symphony cycles with the LSO for the LSO Live label. Haitink was an honorary member of the Berlin Philharmonic.

In April 2006, after an acclaimed two-week engagement in March 2006 with the Chicago Symphony Orchestra (CSO), the CSO appointed Haitink to the newly created position of principal conductor, effective from the 2006–07 season. The contract's duration was four years. Haitink had declined the CSO's offer to be music director, citing his age. Of this contract, Haitink said, "every conductor, including myself, has a sell-by date." He concluded his Chicago principal conductorship in June 2010 with a series of concerts of the complete Beethoven symphonies and was awarded the Theodore Thomas Medallion by the orchestra.

In 2004, Haitink said he would no longer conduct opera, but he made exceptions in 2007, directing three performances of Parsifal in Zürich in March and April and five of Debussy's Pelléas et Mélisande in Paris (Théâtre des Champs-Élysées) in June. Also in 2004 he said he did not plan to conduct again at the Royal Opera, Covent Garden, but he returned to the Royal Opera in December 2007, with the same Zurich production of Parsifal.

Haitink led master classes for young conductors in Lucerne for several years. In June 2015, the European Union Youth Orchestra announced his appointment as its conductor laureate, effective immediately.

In June 2019, Haitink said in an interview with the Dutch daily De Volkskrant that his final concert as conductor was to be in September 2019, formalising his previously announced sabbatical into retirement. His final concert with the Netherlands Radio Philharmonic Orchestra was on 15 June 2019. His final UK concert was at The Proms in London on 3 September, 2019, with the Vienna Philharmonic Orchestra. His last concert was in Lucerne at the KKL on 6 September 2019, with the Vienna Philharmonic.

== Personal life ==
Haitink had five children with Marjolein Snijder, his first wife. Their marriage ended in the 1970s. Two further marriages, both to musicians, also ended in divorce. In 1994 Haitink married his fourth wife, Patricia (née Bloomfield), a barrister who was formerly a viola player in the orchestra of the Royal Opera House, Covent Garden. They lived in West London.

In 2019, Bärenreiter published the book Dirigieren ist ein Rätsel (Conducting is a Mystery), a collaboration between Haitink and the journalists Peter Hagmann and Erich Singer that includes personal reflections by Haitink on his life and career.

Haitink died on 21 October 2021, aged 92, at his home in London.

== Awards and honours ==
=== National ===
- Kilyeni Medal of Honor, Bruckner Society of America (US, 1970)
- Knight of the Ordre des Arts et des Lettres (France, 1972)
- Honorary Knight Commander of the Order of the British Empire (UK, 1977)
- Officer of the Order of the Crown (Belgium, 1977)
- Honorary medal for Arts and Science of the Order of the House of Orange (Netherlands, 2000)
- Honorary Member of the Order of the Companions of Honour (UK, 2002)
- Commander of the Order of the Netherlands Lion (Netherlands, 2017)

=== Music industry and cultural ===
- Gold Medal of the Internationale Gustav Mahler Gesellschaft Vienna
- Gramophone Awards for his recordings in 1980 (Debussy orchestral works), 1985 (Mozart's Don Giovanni), 1986 and 1990 (Vaughan Williams symphonies)
- Erasmus Prize (Netherlands, 1991)
- Musical America "Musician of the Year" (USA, 2007)
- Grammy Awards (USA, 2003 and 2008)
- Echo Klassik (Germany, 2013) for his recording of Mahler's Ninth Symphony (BR-KLASSIK)
- Gramophone Awards Lifetime Achievement Award (United Kingdom, 2015)
- BBC Music Magazine 2018 "Recording of the Year" / "Orchestral Winner" Award for his recording of Gustav Mahler: Symphony No. 3 (BR-KLASSIK)
- Honorary member of the Wiener Philharmoniker (2019)

== Recordings ==
Haitink recorded with several orchestras, including the Royal Concertgebouw Orchestra, Boston Symphony Orchestra, Chicago Symphony Orchestra, London Philharmonic Orchestra, London Symphony Orchestra and Bavarian Radio Symphony Orchestra. He focused on classical symphonies and other orchestral works, conducting cycles of the complete symphonies by Beethoven, Brahms, Tchaikovsky, Bruckner, Mahler, Vaughan Williams and Shostakovich. Haitink recorded the complete five piano concertos of Beethoven and the two piano concertos by Brahms with Claudio Arrau. Other recordings include the complete orchestral works of Debussy, and the two symphonies of Elgar. In the field of opera, he conducted the three Mozart/Da Ponte operas, and Wagner's Tannhäuser and Der Ring des Nibelungen.

Cultural offices
Preceded by Paul van Kempen	Principal Conductor, Netherlands Radio Philharmonic Orchestra; 1957–1961	Succeeded by Jean Fournet
Preceded by John Pritchard	Music Director, Glyndebourne Opera Festival; 1978–1988	Succeeded by Andrew Davis
Preceded by Colin Davis	Music Director, Royal Opera House, Covent Garden; 1987–2002	Succeeded by Antonio Pappano
Preceded by Daniel Barenboim (music director)	Principal Conductor, Chicago Symphony Orchestra; 2006–2010	Succeeded by Riccardo Muti (music director)
