= Sean O'Boyle =

Australian composer and conductor

Sean Michael O'Boyle AM (born 1963) is an Australian composer and conductor.

His River Symphony was performed by the Queensland Orchestra and released on ABC Classics in 2007 on a CD that also included Concerto for Didgeridoo composed with and recorded by William Barton. River Symphony was placed 85th in the Australian Broadcasting Corporation Classic 100 Symphony, and Concerto for Didgeridoo was placed 87th in the Australian Broadcasting Corporation Classic 100 Twentieth Century.

O'Boyle became a Member of the Order of Australia in the 2015 Australia Day honours for "significant service to music as a composer, conductor, musician, performer and musical director."

== Career ==
O'Boyle has written for, conducted, directed and collaborated with many artists including Evelyn Glennie, Adam Lopez, James Morrison, The Whitlams, Tommy Emmanuel, Kate Ceberano, Yvonne Kenny, Teddy Tahu Rhodes, David Hobson, Riley Lee, David Campbell and Jane Rutter.

He has twice received the ABC Golden Manuscript Award for his work as a composer and his projects have received numerous ARIA nominations and awards.

In 2002, O'Boyle was featured exclusively at the Commonwealth Heads of Government Meeting (CHOGM) where his compositions were performed live for Queen Elizabeth II. In 2000, Sean composed the ABC's Olympic theme for use during the Sydney 2000 Olympic Games broadcast, which was subsequently performed for the 2002 Commonwealth Games in Manchester and the 2004 Olympics in Athens.

In 2009 O'Boyle wrote and arranged music for The Ashes – the greatest cricketing event in the world. His setting of the anthem "Jerusalem" was selected as an official anthem of the 2014 Rugby League World Cup. O'Boyle's setting of Jerusalem is played to welcome the English cricket team for each day of play during the Ashes series, when held in the UK.

In 2010 O'Boyle relocated to New York City.

In 2014 O'Boyle was appointed chief arranger and Composer-in-Residence of the Queensland Pops Orchestra.

In 2014 Dame Evelyn Glennie performed the world premiere of his percussion concerto Portraits of Immortal Love with the Tacoma Symphony Orchestra under the direction of Sarah Ioannides.

From 2011-2017 he was an Artist in Residence for Moravian College in Bethlehem Pennsylvania.

From 2017-2019 O'Boyle was Artistic Director, music, for the University of the Sunshine Coast, where he designed an implemented the inaugural music program.

From 2020 he resides in London working a major musical theatre project.

== Awards and nominations ==
=== APRA Music Awards ===
Year	Nominated works	Award	Result
1999	"Fhir An Bhata" with Riley Lee and Queensland Symphony Orchestra	Most Performed Children's Work	Nominated

=== ARIA Music Awards ===
Year	Nominated works	Award	Result
2001	George Meets the Orchestra with George Spartels and Queensland Philharmonic Orchestra	Best Children's Album	Nominated
2002	Symphony of Lullabies with Tasmanian Symphony Orchestra	Best Children's Album	Nominated
2005	Hush Little Baby	Best Children's Album	Nominated
