= Fate motif =

Fate motif refers to a musical motif in a number of different works:

- Symphony No. 5 (Beethoven)
- Carmen (opera by Bizet)
- Symphony No. 6 (Mahler)
- Pelleas und Melisande (Schoenberg)
- Symphony No. 8 (Shostakovich)
- Oboe Concerto (Strauss)
- Symphony No. 4 (Tchaikovsky)
- La forza del destino (opera by Verdi)
- Die Walküre (opera by Richard Wagner)
