= Symphonies by Pyotr Ilyich Tchaikovsky =

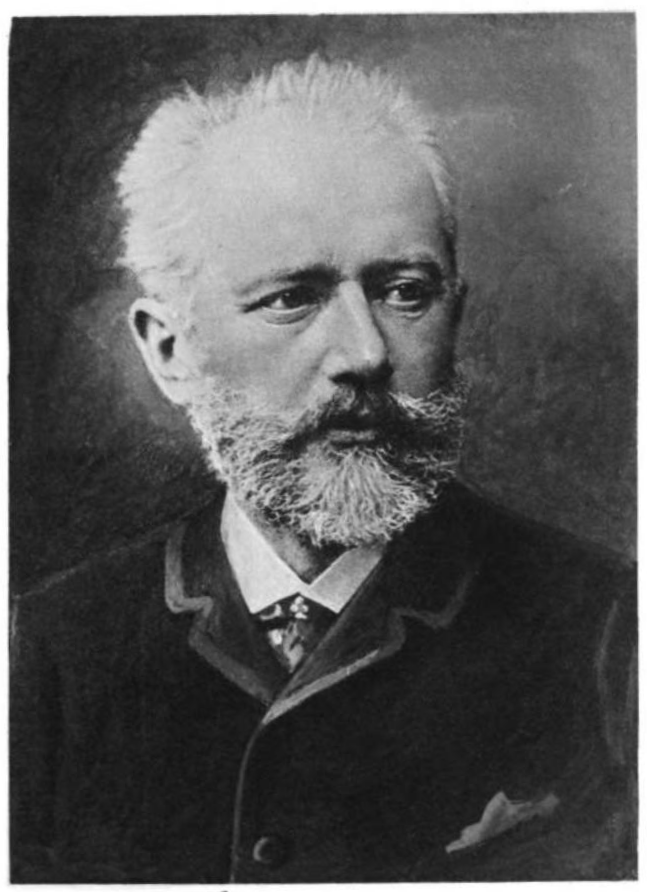
Pyotr Ilyich Tchaikovsky

Pyotr Ilyich Tchaikovsky struggled with sonata form, the primary Western principle for building large-scale musical structures since the middle of the 18th century. Traditional Russian treatment of melody, harmony and structure actually worked against sonata form's modus operandi of movement, growth and development. Russian music—the Russian creative mentality as a whole, in fact—functioned on the principle of stasis. Russian novels, plays and operas were written as collections of self-contained tableaux, with the plots proceeding from one set-piece to the next. Russian folk music operated along the same lines, with songs comprised as a series of self-contained melodic units repeated continually. Compared to this mindset, the precepts of sonata form probably seemed as alien as if they had arrived from the moon.

Sonata form also was not designed to accommodate the emotionally charged statements that Tchaikovsky wanted to make. In this, he was far from alone—it was a major preoccupation of the Romantic age, to the point that the validity of the symphony was questioned seriously and alternatives to it were actually devised. These alternatives, which included program music in general and the symphonic poem in particular, did not offer a complete solution. Instead, they left Tchaikovsky facing a paradox. He reportedly did not care for program music, to the point of reproaching himself for writing the fantasy-overture Romeo and Juliet. Yet the notion of writing symphonies as purely intellectual patterns of chords, rhythms and modulations was at least equally abhorrent.

Nevertheless, Tchaikovsky attempted to adhere more closely at least to the manner of sonata form in his first three symphonies. They remain chronicles of his attempts to reconcile his training from the Saint Petersburg Conservatory with the music he had heard all his life and his own innate penchant for melody. Both those factors worked against sonata form, not with it. With the Fourth Symphony, Tchaikovsky hit upon a solution he would refine in his remaining two numbered symphonies and his program symphony Manfred—one that would enable to reconcile the more personal, more dramatic and heightened emotional statements he wished to make with the classical structure of the symphony, showing, as musicologist Martin Cooper phrased it, that "his inspiration was stronger than scruple."

Scrutiny over Tchaikovsky's work, however, has remained intense at times, especially among critics. The fact that Tchaikovsky did not follow sonata form strictly and instead amended it creatively has been seen at times as a weakness rather than a sign of originality. Even with what music critic Harold C. Schonberg termed "a professional reevaluation" of Tchaikovsky's work, the practice of faulting Tchaikovsky for not following in the steps of the Viennese masters has not gone away entirely. More often than in the past, however, his approach is being viewed as innovative rather than evasive and an effective fusion of two dissimilar musical philosophies.

== Russian versus Western ==
Ideally, Tchaikovsky's training at the Saint Petersburg Conservatory would have thoroughly equipped him to work with European principles and forms of organizing musical material, just as immersion in those things might have helped him gain a sense of belonging to world culture. However, Tchaikovsky was still "Russian to the marrow," as he told his patroness, Nadezhda von Meck, "saturating myself from earliest childhood with the inexplicable beauty of the characteristic traits of Russian folk song, so that I passionately love every manifestation of the Russian spirit." Native instincts that strong could drive him toward Russian musical principles, which in several ways worked in opposition to Western ones, and make his Russianness work as much against him as it did for him. The result was a continual struggle with Western sonata form, especially in dealing with the symphony. A major block for Tchaikovsky in this department, according to musicologist David Brown, may have been

a cardinal flaw in the Russian character: inertia.... In literature it produces the novel that proceeds as a succession of self-contained sections, even set-piece scenes....Indeed, such tableau organization is fundamental to the most Russian of operatic scenarios.... [T]he most characteristic Russian scenario is like a strip cartoon, each scene presenting a crucial incident or stage in the plot, leaving the spectator to supply in his imagination what has happened in the gaps between these incidents.

Brown lists several factors in Russian folk music which contribute to this pattern of inertia. Melodies in Russian folk songs are self-contained, with no interaction between themes in contrasting musical keys or any clear transition from one theme to another. Instead, melodies are repeated, "using similar intervals and phrases with an almost ritual insistence," according to musicologist John Warrack. This makes many folk songs essentially a series of variations on one basic shape or pattern of a few notes. The problem with repetition is that, even with a surface level of rhythmic activity added, the melody remains static over a period of time. Beneath that surface, nothing really moves or goes anywhere; the effect of the rhythm is decorative, not organic, because no true progress has taken place.

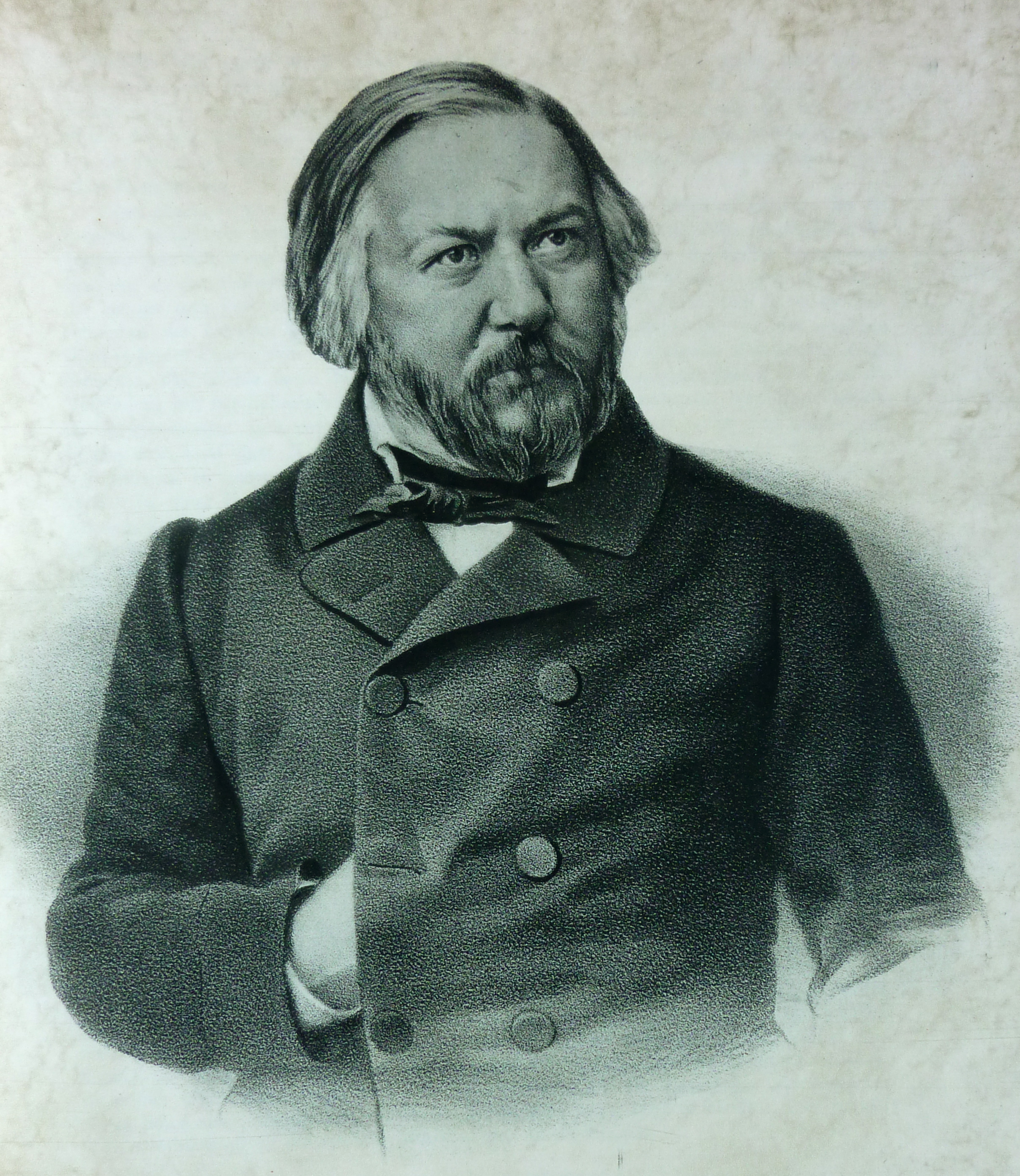
Mikhail Glinka

Mikhail Glinka's Kamarinskaya, which became famous as the first orchestral work based entirely on Russian folk song, is a case in point of the limits Russian composers faced and how they attempted to work around them. Kamarinskaya is based on two themes, a slow bridal song, "Izza gor" (From beyond the mountains), and the title song, a naigrïsh. This second song is actually an instrumental dance played to an ostinato melody. This melody is repeated for as long as the dancers can move to it. Glinka begins with "Izza gor," then introduces Kamarinskaya as a contrasting theme. He uses a transition to return to the bridal song and show the contrast between the two themes. Another transition, this time using motifs from the bridal song, leads to the dance theme and the piece ends with the Kamarinskaya dance.

In a Western piece, after the first theme is introduced and harmony propels the music forward, it modulates to introduce a second theme in a contrasting musical key. The two themes then interact and the composition grows as an organic creation. Tension continues building as this thematic dialogue becomes increasingly complex. This dialogue or interchange eventually propels the piece to a climactic point of resolution. Kamarinskaya does not follow this pattern. Nor can it. The ostinato melody of the second song will not allow any motivic development without distorting the character of the piece. Glinka therefore uses the principle of repetition from folk song to allowing the musical structure to unfold. He repeats the theme 75 times, all the while varying the accompaniment—the instrumental timbres, harmonization and counterpoint—in a technique that Brown, Francis Maes and other musicologists call "changing backgrounds." By following this approach, Glinka preserves the original character of the dance and complements it with creative variations to sustain listener interest. However, because there is no thematic growth, the music remains static. It does not move forward as a Western piece of music would.

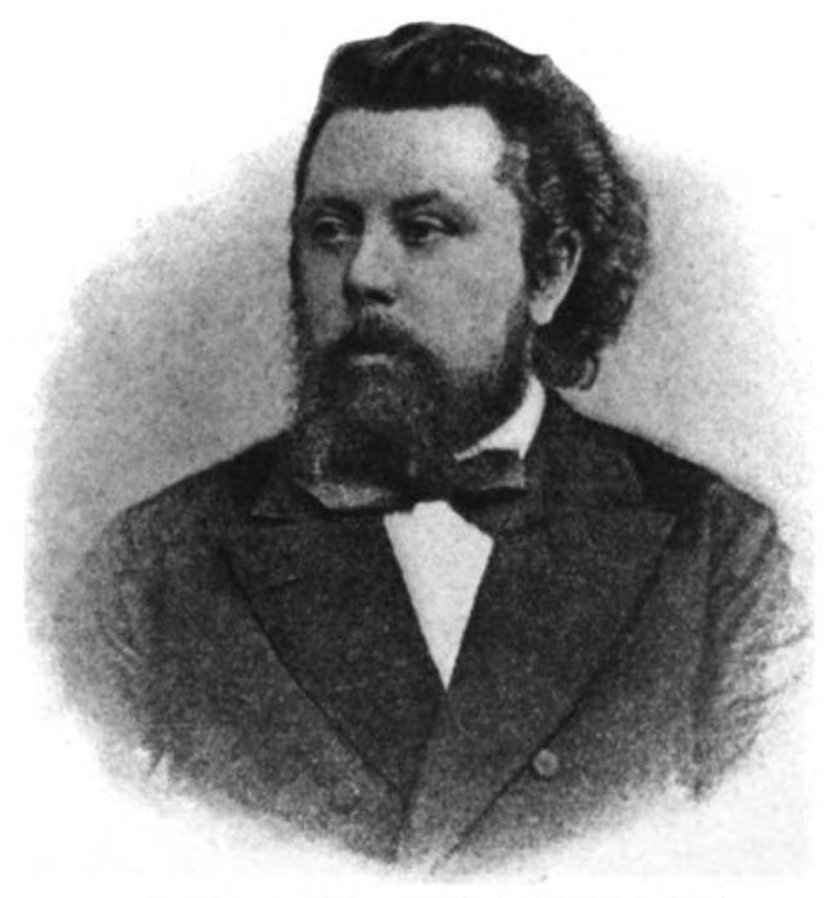
Modest Mussorgsky

Simply adopting Germanic principles of formal musical organization was not going to solve the problem. Not only did Russian music refuse to cooperate with them but neither did the Russian creative mind. As Modest Mussorgsky phrased it, "The German, when he thinks, will first examine and explore, then make his conclusion: our [Russian] brother will first make his conclusion, then amuse himself with examination and exploration." Tchaikovsky's exposure to and love of Russian folk-song, according to Cooper, "formed the background for all his other music experience, a subconscious musical atmosphere in which all other musical experiences were saturated," and Brown notes that Tchaikovsky's "natural ability to think in terms of organic symphonic procedures"—in other words, in the ability to "examine and explore, then make his conclusion"—"was certainly limited." The situation was not merely one of preoccupation with cause over effect, Brown writes, but also of an inability to connect cause with effect. "For just as it seems difficult for the Russian musical theorist to apply his active, controlled intelligence to the scrutiny of an imaginitive concept," he adds, "so it seems difficult for the Russian composer to harness his active, controlled intelligence to the unfolding of that imaginitive concept—as Bach had done so pre-eminently in the fugue, or the classical masters in the symphony."

== Melody versus form ==
=== Russian melody ===
As large a challenge for Tchaikovsky as his Russian creative mentality was also his greatest compositional gift—namely, his own sense of melody. For him, however, the problem was two-fold. The first part stemmed, again, from his ethnic heritage. Brown points out that Tchaikovsky, like the majority of 19th-century Russian composers, was highly gifted melodically. However, even when those melodies were conceived with broad, multi-phrase structures, they tended to be even more self-contained than those in Russian folk songs, "thus requiring the composer to climb, as it were, a perimeter fence if he wanted to move on, perhaps to explore a new melodic field." This, Brown says, is again typical of Russian creativity, with a mindset of stasis rather than ongoing development.

Circle of fifths in Western harmony, showing where major and minor keys were to modulate

"This problem of transition", Brown writes—of moving smoothly from one theme to another—"was one of the most vexed the Russian composer faced, greater in many ways than that of development." In European music, this is where modulation comes into play; you simply change from the musical key of your first theme to the contrasting but related key of your second theme. Modulation was a driving principle in both Western harmony and sonata form. It maintained harmonic interest over an extended time-scale, provided a clear contrast between musical themes and showed how those themes were related to each other. Western harmony was a study in motion; it propelled the music and, on a larger scale, gave it shape.

Remember that Russian creativity centered around inertia, not motion. This mindset, according to Brown, made harmony a potential trap for Tchaikovsky, as it was for many other Russian composers. He had to get his melodies to go somewhere, to have the ability to connect together instead of standing apart and separate. Tchaikovsky had already shown "a flair for harmony" that "astonished" Rudolph Kündinger, his music tutor during his time at the School of Jurisprudence, and a thorough knowledge should have been part of his studies at the Saint Petersburg Conservatory. However, Tchaikovsky would run into problems with modulation as soon as the opening theme of his First Symphony. (Note: It was Tchaikovsky's challenges with modulation, despite his prowess in Western harmony, that sent him to study with Nikolai Zaremba at the Russian Musical Society and from there to the Saint Petersburg Conservatory. According to the composer's friend Nikolay Kashkin, Tchaikovsky had a music–loving cousin in the Horse Grenadiers who had attended Zaremba's class. One day this cousin boasted that he could make the transition from one key to another in three chords or less and dared Tchaikovsky to do the same. Tchaikovsky improvised at the piano several times but could not manage the transition. Being proud at considering himself the superior musician, Tchaikovsky asked his cousin where he had learned to do so. His cousin then told him about Zaremba's class (Holden, 36).)

In the exposition portion of sonata form, where both musical themes are introduced, the first theme generally begins on the tonic, the key in which the composition is to be written, then ends in preparation to modulate toward the next relative key to connect with the second theme. This "fundamental move," as Brown phrases it, could prove the greatest degree of difficulty for a composer. In the best-handled examples from the Classical era, this move "is not just a modulation but a process of controlled tonal dynamism." Instead of being a preparation of this event, the opening theme of the First Symphony simply ends on the tonic, exactly where it began, and becomes a self-enclosed melody as per Russian practice. He reduces the transition to the second theme to a half-dozen bars in the dominant.

=== Romantic-age dilemma ===
In the second of his two challenges with melody and sonata form, Tchaikovsky was very far from alone. Romantic composers on the whole were more focused on self–expression and the illustration of extra–musical content in their pieces than their Classical–age predecessors. Out of this concern came a widened palette of tone color, a greatly widened field of harmony and a similarly expanded development of orchestration. Most importantly, melody took on a new and very different significance than it had occupied with Haydn, Mozart or Beethoven. The themes the Romantics wrote, original in their own right, were now often seen as the reason for the compositions' existence. However, they were not the regular, symmetrical melodic shapes that worked well with sonata form. This was why, musicologist Martin Cooper asserts, Romantic-age composers on the whole "were never natural symphonists." Even the efforts by Robert Schumann, Felix Mendelssohn and Johannes Brahms to return to the linear, architectural music of Haydn, Mozart and Beethoven were attempts to fuse Classical and Romantic musical values. This worked most successfully in Brahms, Cooper explains, "because in him the violence and directness of emotional expression was somehow veiled and muted and therefore least apt to disturb the balance and proportion of the form."

The problem, Cooper emphasizes, was melody. Many of the themes that Haydn, Mozart and Beethoven used in their symphonies may not seem distinctive. Distinctiveness, however, was not the point. The point was what could be done with those themes—what pieces of musical architecture could be erected by using them. They were the compositional equivalent of cement blocks or bricks. Blocks and bricks, while not necessarily attractive, can work handily in constructing a house, a shop building or a cathedral. Just as those blocks fit together, the themes used by the Viennese masters, written in contrasting keys but related in harmony, contrasted, merged and grew into a musical structure larger and more intricate than any of those themes by themselves. Using the same analogy, imagine trying to build a wall or a building with polished marble statues. This is basically what the Romantic were producing, music-wise, with the themes they wrote. Statues do not work well as building blocks. They will not fit together. They stand apart and command attention instead of blending into the general scheme of things. Therefore, you will not get a well-built structure by using them.

Because more composers were trying to erect structures with statues instead of cement blocks, they started doubting whether the symphony was still a viable form. In other words, they were thinking in reverse to the rationale of the classical composers who had codified sonata form. They could not get the form to function with their themes as they wanted it to do, rather than refashioning their themes as Beethoven did, for example, to work within the form. According to musicologist Mark Evans Bonds,

Even symphonies by [such] well-known composers of the early 19th century as Méhul, Rossini, Cherubini, Hérold, Czerny, Clementi, Weber and Moscheles were perceived in their own time as standing in the symphonic shadow of Haydn, Mozart, Beethoven, or some combination of the three.... [T]here was a growing sense that these works were aesthetically far inferior to Beethoven's.... The real question was not so much whether symphonies could still be written, but whether the genre could continue to flourish and grow as it had over the previous half-century in the hands of Haydn, Mozart and Beethoven. On this count, there were varying degrees of skepticism but virtually no real optimism.... Hector Berlioz was the only composer "able to grapple successfully with Beethoven's legacy."

Some Romantic composers worked around this problem by changing what they built. Instead of the musical equivalent of buildings, they constructed statue gardens—places which could showcase items depicting beauty and drama. These musical statue gardens, known as concert overtures worked as vehicles "within which to blend musical, narrative and pictoral ideas." Examples included Mendelssohn's overtures A Midsummer Night's Dream (1826) and The Hebrides (1830). Eventually, composers built bigger gardens, otherwise known as symphonic poems. In these new, looser and more flexible musical forms, large-scale orchestral writing could be combined with strong emotions and brilliant timbres to fulfill a wide range of extra-musical demands.

=== Theme or form first ===
Tchaikovsky's opening entry for his diary of 1872 reads as follows:

Yesterday, on the road from Vorozhba to Kiev, music came singing and echoing through my head after a long interval of silence. A theme in embryo, in B-flat major, took possession of my mind and almost led me on to attempt a symphony. Suddenly the thought came over me to cast aside Stasov's not too successful Tempest and devote the summer to composing a symphony that should throw all my previous works in the shade.

This entry confirms that Tchaikovsky's priority in composition was a notable, complete melody, what musicologist John Warrack calls the "lyrical idea." With that melody might come the inspiration to use it in a symphony, concerto, or other work. This was in reverse order to how Beethoven, Mozart, and Haydn composed. For them, the process of building a symphony came before devising a suitable theme to use in it. This was the natural approach for composers for whom the mechanics of sonata form had become second nature. For Mozart, working out a movement or complete piece in this manner was an act in itself; notating that music became simply mechanical and he appreciated diversion while doing so. Beethoven, in contrast, wrestled mightily with his themes, adjusting them to fit the musical form he was going to use. For both men, form came first.

For Tchaikovsky, the symphony was a ready-made form into which he could place whatever theme he composed. The form itself came a distant second to the melody used in it. Composing in this manner would be akin to constructing a skyscraper without a firm blueprint. Doing so may have been one reason Tchaikovsky had such difficulty with sonata form. Another reason may have been that he was using complete, independent melodies, which by their very completeness could not be developed easily in the process of sonata form. As his friend and former pupil Sergei Taneyev points out, a composer like Tchaikovsky could modify such themes to generate tension, maintain interest and generally satisfy listeners, but all the composer was really doing was repeating them. He was not disassembling or combining or using them as structural elements. Tchaikovsky may have realized this dilemma for himself when he wrote, as an experienced composer of 48,

All my life I have been much troubled by my inability to grasp and manipulate form in music. I fought hard against this defect and can say with pride that I achieved some progress, but I shall end my days without ever having written anything that is perfect in form. What I write has always a mountain of padding: An experienced eye can detect the thread in my seams, and I can do nothing about it.

Note: Tchaikovsky talks about manipulating the form, not the theme.

== Early attempts ==
Analyzing the symphonies of the Viennese masters was likely a given part of Tchaikovsky's curriculum at the Saint Petersburg Conservatory. Through it, he apparently realized, as musicologist Ralph W. Wood points out, "that design is a crucial factor in music." He may have also "grasped that form and thematic material must be interdependent, every piece of material carrying the implication of its own self-dictated form." However, perhaps because of Tchaikovsky's own assumptions about emotion and music, he may have felt that he never solved or even confronted squarely the problem of form versus material. He idolized Mozart as a master of the form, was aware of how his idol's symphonies functioned compared to his own, and found his own lacking. Having clarity or security in how to solve those perceived challenges was another matter. While Tchaikovsky's earlier symphonies are considered optimistic and nationalistic (in other words, different from the music he would eventually write), they are also chronicles of his attempts to reconcile his conservatory training and study of the masters with the native musical traditions and innate lyricism that worked against what he had learned.

=== Symphony No. 1 "Winter Daydreams" ===
Tchaikovsky confessed to his patroness, Nadezhda von Meck, that while his First Symphony "is in many ways very immature, yet fundamentally it has more substance and is better than many of my other more mature works." This, Brown says, is extremely true. Its rich lyricism and Mendelssohnian charm and grace belie the fact that it drove its composer to a nervous breakdown while working on it. Tchaikovsky realized while composing it that, for him to grow as an artist, he needed to work "around the rules" of sonata form to accommodate the music he was hoping to write. In doing so, Brown states, the composer would often show tremendous resourcefulness, even in this piece. "The opening stretch of the first movement," he writes, "is enough to scotch the hoary old legend that Tchaikovsky was devoid of any real symphonic aptitude."

=== Symphony No. 2 "Little Russian" ===
Here Tchaikovsky harnessed the harmonic, melodic and rhythmic quirks of Ukrainian folk music to produce an opening movement massive in scale, intricate in structure and complex in texture—what Brown calls "one of the most solid structures Tchaikovsky ever fashioned"—and a finale that, with the folk song "The Crane" offered in an ever-dizzying series of backdrops, showcased how well he could mine the same vein as Glinka and the nationalist set of composers known collectively as The Five. Even so, Tchaikovsky was not satisfied. When he revised the work eight years after its premiere, he made a large cut in the finale and wrote a clearer, simpler first movement along Western lines. This is the version performed today. However, Tchaikovsky's friend and former student Sergei Taneyev considered the earlier one superior. His reputation as one of the finest craftsmen among Russian composers lends his opinion considerable weight.

=== Symphony No. 3 "Polish" ===
The Third Symphony is unique among Tchaikovsky's symphonies in musical key (the only one written in the major) and number of movements (five). Patterned after Schumann's Rhenish Symphony and possibly conceived with the notion of what that composer might write if he were Russian, the Third shows Tchaikovsky at what musicologist Hans Keller calls "his freest and most fluent so far." (Note: Tchaikovsky was not the only Russian composer to use Schumann as a model. Nikolai Rimsky-Korsakov's First Symphony, which he wrote as a naval cadet, is closely patterned after Schumann's Fourth.) Academic movements rub shoulders with fanciful, dance-like ones not far removed from the composer's ballets (his first, Swan Lake, was not far off the horizon) in the manner of the orchestral suites the composer would write between his Fourth and Fifth Symphonies. Some musicologists, Brown among them, brand the Third uneven in quality and inspiration. Others, including Dutch musicologist Francis Maes, consider it underrated. Maes points out its "high degree of motivic and polyphonic intricacies" and its "magic of sound ... combined with capricious rhythms and fanciful manipulation of musical forms."

== Symphonic poem: alternative and catalyst ==
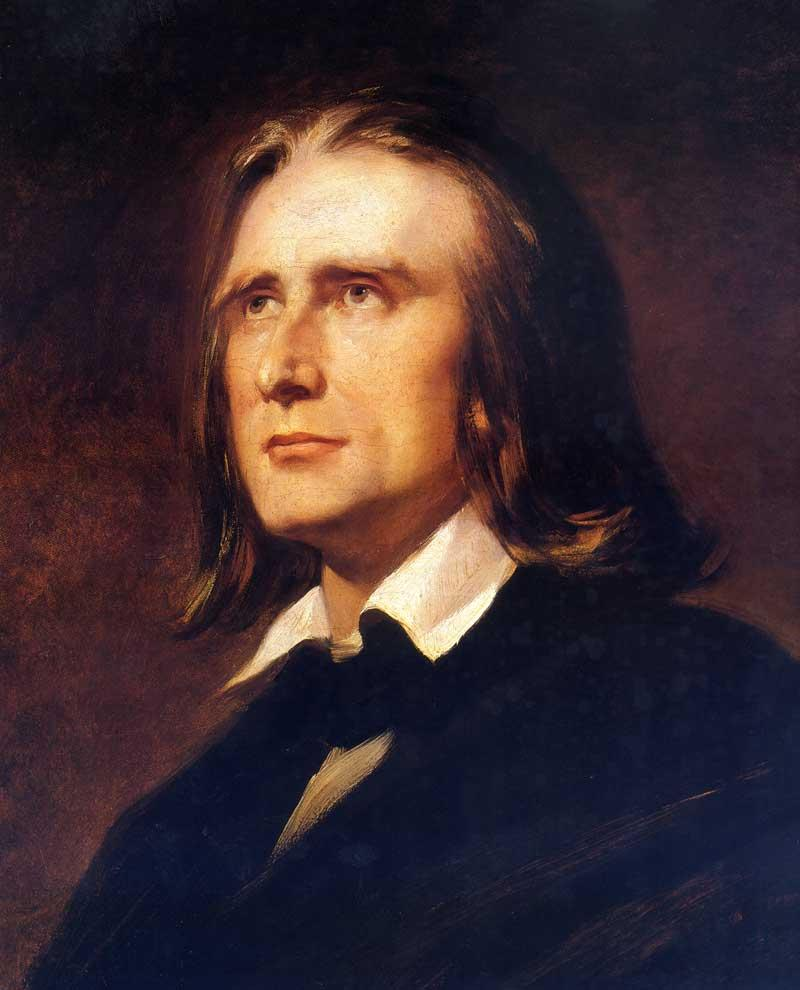
Portrait of Liszt (1856) by Wilhelm von Kaulbach.

While Tchaikovsky struggled with his first three symphonies, developments in Europe led to an alternative to this genre that, in a reverse twist, offered to change the scope of the symphony. Hungarian composer Franz Liszt desired a form of orchestral music that would offer greater flexibility in developing musical themes than the symphony then allowed but also preserve the overall unity of a musical composition. His objective was to expand single-movement works beyond the concert overture format. By doing so, he hoped to combine the dramatic, emotive and evocative qualities of concert overtures with the scale and musical complexity normally reserved for the opening movements of symphonies.

The fruit of Liszt's labors was what he eventually termed symphonic poems. In them, he used two alternatives to sonata form. Beethoven had used the first of these, cyclic form, to link separate movements thematically with one another. Liszt took this process one step further by combining themes into a single-movement cyclic structure. The second alternative, thematic transformation, originated with Haydn and Mozart. This process worked in a similar manner as variation but instead of a theme being changed into a related or subsidiary version of the main one, it becomes transformed into a related but separate, independent theme. Beethoven used it in the finale of his Ninth Symphony when he transformed the theme of the "Ode to Joy" into a Turkish march. Weber and Berlioz had also transformed themes. Schubert used thematic transformation to bind together the movements of his Wanderer Fantasy, a work that had a tremendous influence on Liszt. However, Liszt learned to create longer formal structures solely through thematic transformation.

Liszt's approach to musical form in his symphonic poems was also unorthodox. Instead of following a strict presentation and development of musical themes as in sonata form, he placed his themes into a loose, episodic pattern. There, recurring melodies called motifs were thematically transformed as musical and programmatic needs dictated. (Richard Wagner would make good use of this practice in his operas and music dramas.) Recapitulations, where themes are normally restated after they are combined and contrasted in development, were foreshortened. Codas, where pieces of music generally wind to a close, were greatly enlarged to a size and scope that can affect the listener's concept of the themes. Themes shuffled into new and unexpected patterns of order and three- or four-movement structures were rolled into one in a continual process of creative experimentation.

A number of composers, especially Bohemian and Russian, followed in Liszt's footsteps to develop the symphonic poem further. Added to this was the Russian love of story-telling, for which the genre seemed expressly tailored. Tchaikovsky wrote a symphonic poem, Fatum, after he had finished his First Symphony and first opera, The Voyevoda. There, he dabbled with the free form the new genre offered. However, the work did not come out well and he destroyed it after two performances. For his next programmatic work, the fantasy-overture Romeo and Juliet, Tchaikovsky reverted to sonata form, structuring it in a similar fashion to Beethoven's concert overtures. However, in a case of musical cross-pollination, the symphonic poem offered the potential to change the nature of the symphony in its merging of a wide emotional range with symphonic resources. This potential played to the conception Tchaikovsky would form of the symphony as a vehicle for personal expression and one whose details could, as he phrased it to his patroness, Nadezhda von Meck, "be manipulated as freely as one chooses."

== Program music, lyrical form ==
Tchaikovsky's view of program music was ambivalent. He disliked the genre personally but generally needed some sort of subject upon which to write. Whether that catalyst was a literary source, an overt program or a more subjective one based on an abstract theme such as love or fate did not necessarily matter. He needed something to fire his imagination and get his creative juices flowing. One indisputable fact was that Tchaikovsky had a flair for the genre. When he was caught up in the drama or the emotional states of the characters, as in Romeo and Juliet, the results could be spectacular. When the work became difficult, as it would when he worked on the Manfred symphony, he became discouraged and complained that writing to a program was unpleasant and it was easier to do so without one.

In a letter to von Meck dated December 5, 1878, Tchaikovsky outlined two kinds of inspiration for a symphonic composer, a subjective and an objective one:

In the first instance, [the composer] uses his music to express his own feelings, joys, sufferings; in short, like a lyric poet he pours out, so to speak, his own soul. In this instance, a program is not only not necessary but even impossible. But it is another matter when a musician, reading a poetic work or struck by a scene in nature, wishes to express in musical form that subject that has kindled his inspiration. Here a program is essential.... Program music can and must exist, just as it is impossible to demand that literature make do without the epic element and limit itself to lyricism alone.

Writing to a program, then, was apparently a matter of course for Tchaikovsky. Technically, for him, every piece of music could contain a program. The difference for him lay in the explicitness or implicitness of the program itself. A symphony generally followed the lines of an implicit program, while a symphonic poem followed an explicit one. This also meant that, technically, any alternatives or amendments to sonata form used to underline either specific events or the general tone of a literary program in a symphonic poem could also be used to illustrate the "feelings, joys, sufferings" conveyed in a symphony; the only difference was in the type of program being illustrated. In fact, Brown claims, there is a considerable amount of Tchaikovsky's symphonic manner contained in the symphonic poem Francesca da Rimini, which the composer wrote not long before the Fourth Symphony. The Allegro vivo section where the composer evokes the storm and whirlwind in the underworld is much like the first subject section of a Tchaikovsky symphony, while Francesca's theme in A major takes the place of a second subject.

Also, Tchaikovsky was apparently expanding his conception of the symphony from one where Germanic models were to be followed slavishly to a looser, more flexible alternative more in keeping with the symphonic poem. Sonata form, according to Wood, was never intended to be a musical straitjacket but, rather, to leave the composer "innumerable choices for building up a coherent movement" that would offer variety and, "by the relationships of its successive thematic elements and the management of its transitions ... have the appearance of organic growth." The problem for Tchaikovsky, however, was whether "organic growth" was even an option in building a large-scale piece of music. He wrote to von Meck after he had written the Fourth Symphony,

You ask if I keep to established forms. Yes and no. There are certain kinds of compositions which imply the use of familiar forms, for example symphony. Here I keep in general outline to the usual traditional forms, but only in general outline, i.e. the sequence of the work's movements. The details can be treated very freely, if this is demanded by the development of the ideas. For instance, in our symphony the first movement is written with very marked digressions. The second subject, which should be in the relative major, is minor and remote. In the recapitulation of the main part of the movement the second subject does not appear at all, etc. The finale, too, is made up of a whole row of derivations from individual forms....

Cooper suggests that for Tchaikovsky the symphony had become "a form, a convenience, no longer the natural, instinctive channel for his musical imagination" that it could or should have been had he followed strict Germanic practices. Even if this could have been the case with Tchaikovsky, the path would have been difficult. Cooper explains "that lyrical emotion should find its natural expression in sonata form is perhaps not unthinkable, but only if that form is so natural to a composer, both by instinct and habit, that it has come to be really an acquired instinct, a 'second nature,' as we say; and this was certainly never true of Tchaikovsky." Brown writes that while Tchaikovsky "was not without a certain measure of the true symphonist's gift for organic thematic growth," he concurs that for him "to create the sort of complex organic experience" that would allow him to meld lyric expression with sonata form "lay beyond his abilities."

Nor, again, was this solely Tchaikovsky's dilemma. "The Romantics were never natural symphonists," Cooper writes, for basically the same reason as Tchaikovsky—"because music was to them primarily evocative and biographical—generally autobiographical—and the dramatic phrase, the highly [colored] melody and the 'atmospheric' harmony which they loved are in direct opposition to the nature of the symphony, which is primarily an architectural form."

== Juxtaposition ==
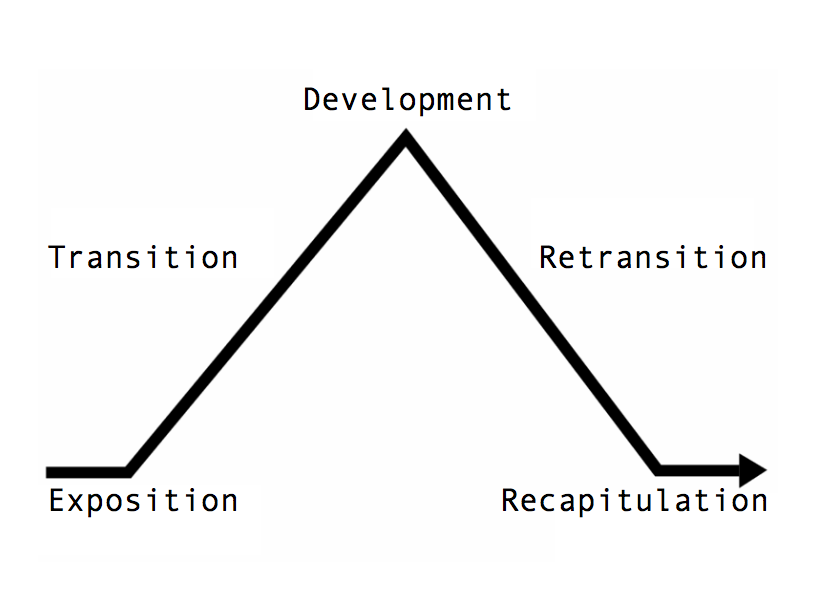
Sonata form as a dramatic pyramid showing the three main sections—exposition, development and recapitulation.

Two breakthroughs which, according to Brown, Austrian musicologist Hans Keller, Dutch musicologist Francis Maes and Soviet musicologist Daniel Zhitomirsky, came to Tchaikovsky while composing his Fourth Symphony, worked hand-in-hand in giving him a workable solution to building large-scale forms. The first answer was essentially to sidestep thematic interaction and keep sonata form only as an "outline," as Zhitomirsky phrases it, containing two contrasting themes. Within this outline, the focus now centered on periodic alternation and juxtaposition. Instead of offering what Brown calls "a rich and well-ordered argument," Tchaikovsky integrates what Keller calls "new and violent contrasts" between musical themes, keys and harmonies by placing blocks of dissimilar tonal and thematic material alongside one another. These blocks, Zhitomirsky explains, are demarcated by their distinct contrast in musical material and "by the fact that each theme [used in them] usually constitutes an independent and structurally complete episode." The block containing the main theme, Zhitomirsky writes, alternates with the one containing the second theme. The former, he continues, is "steadily enlivened in reiteration" by what Warrack calls "ostinato figures, dramatic pedal–points, sequences that screw anticipation to a fever pitch with each new step, all expressed in frenzied rhythmic activity." The result of this enlivening, Zhitomirsky says, is "that the very contrast of the two blocks is consistently sharpened."

An important part of this process, Keller states, is that "thematic and harmonic contrasts" are "not allowed to coincide." Mozart, he writes, evidently preceded Tchaikovsky in this tactic of modulatory delay and may have helped give Tchaikovsky the impetus in attempting it himself, although Tchaikovsky develops this form of contrast "on an unprecedented scale." Keller offers the second theme in the first movement of the Fourth Symphony as an example of how this process works. In sonata form, he writes, the first subject enters in the tonic and the second subject follows in a contrasting but related key harmonically. Tension occurs when the music (and the listener with it) is pulled away from the tonic. Tchaikovsky "not only increases the contrasts between the themes on the one hand and the keys on the other," but ups the ante by introducing his second theme in a key unrelated to the first theme and delaying the transition to the expected key. In the first movement of the Fourth Symphony, Tchaikovsky introduces the second theme in A♭ minor. Since the symphony is written in the key of F minor, the second theme should go either to the relative major (A♭ major) or the dominant (C minor). By the time Tchaikovsky establishes the relative major, this theme has finished playing. Thus, Keller says, "the thematic second subject precedes the harmonic second subject" (italics Keller).

This process, according to Brown and Keller, builds momentum and adds intense drama. While the result, Warrack charges, is still "an ingenious episodic treatment of two tunes rather than a symphonic development of them" in the Germanic sense, Brown counters that it took the listener of the period "through a succession of often highly charged sections which added up to a radically new kind of symphonic experience" (italics Brown), one that functioned not on the basis of summation, as Austro-German symphonies did, but on one of accumulation.

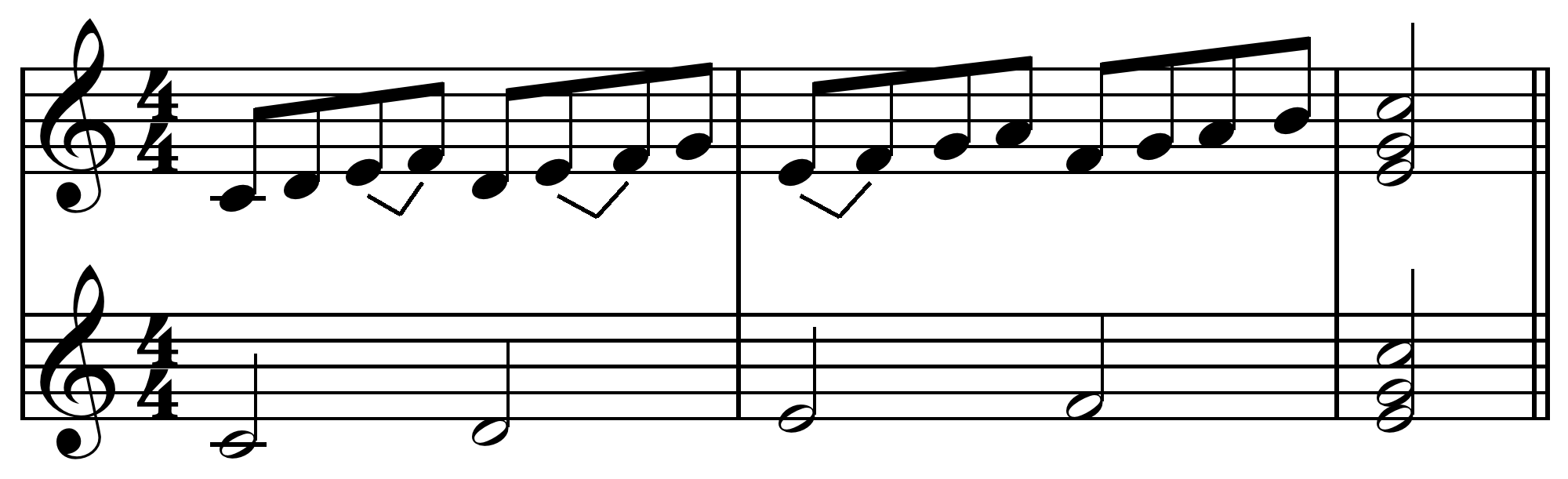
Sequence ascending by step. Note that there are only four segments, continuously higher, and that the segments continue by the same distance (seconds: C-D, D-E, etc.).

Within this overall concept of juxtaposition, Tchaikovsky employed his second solution. While Maes calls this answer a "structure" and Zhitomirsky an "independent and structurally complete episode," it could actually be described as a system in which melody, harmony, rhythm and tone color become interrelated elements functioning together like the working parts of a clock, each part moving independently but also as part of an overall action serving one purpose. With a clock, that purpose is indicating the time. With a symphony of the kind Tchaikovsky strove to craft, that purpose is two–fold: to resolve the overall tonal and emotional conflict introduced at the beginning of the work and to relieve the tensions produced as a by-product of that conflict, which keep the listener's attention as that conflict progresses. This systematic grouping of normally independent elements may have been a natural outgrowth of Tchaikovsky's creative process, as he mentioned to von Meck:

I write my sketches on the first piece of paper that comes to hand, sometimes a scrap of writing paper, and I write in very abbreviated form. The melody never appears in my head without its attendant harmony. In general, these two musical elements, together with the rhythm, cannot be conceived separately: every melodic idea carries its own inevitable harmony and rhythm. If the harmonies are very complicated, one must indicate the part-writing on the sketch.... Concerning instrumentation, if one is composing for orchestra, the musical idea carries with it the proper instrumentation for its expression.

By making subtle but noticeable changes in the rhythm or phrasing of a tune, modulating to another key, changing the melody itself or varying the instruments playing it, Tchaikovsky could keep a listener's interest from flagging. By extending the number of repetitions, he could increase the musical and dramatic tension of a passage, building "into an emotional experience of almost unbearable intensity," as Brown phrases it, controlling when the peak and release of that tension would take place. Cooper calls this practice a subtle form of unifying a piece of music and adds that Tchaikovsky brought it to a high point of refinement.

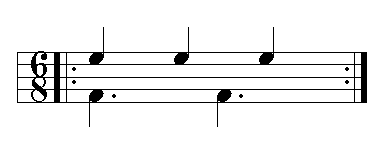
Vertical hemiola.

As did Keller, Maes uses the first movement of the Fourth Symphony as an example of how this union of elements provides dramatic impact. This movement is "dominated by a powerful and highly rhythmic motto in the brass" which Tchaikovsky uses to demarcate various points in the overall structure. Tchaikovsky makes the actual first theme, already rhythmically complex, seem even more unstable by the notes he writes to accompany it. When he recapitulates this theme, he adds further rhythmic movement in the form of chromatic lines in the woodwinds. The second theme follows a more regular rhythm, which is enhanced by exchanges between violins and woodwinds. The music goes from rhythmic complexity to stasis, "in which a single chord is maintained for twenty-two measures in a regular rhythmic pattern." This respite, however, is also preparation for "a rhythmically confused episode" where various instrumental groups "converse by complex hemiola structures," where multiple rhythms play against one another. "That passage wipes out the sense of meter, rendering the reappearance of the motto all the more dramatic. In the development, the complexities of the exposition are further increased."

The crux of the drama in this movement, Maes continues, comes musically from the rhythmic conflict between the opening motif and the first theme. At the same time, a dramatic conflict is played out between the dramatic nature of these two themes. "The motto uses the rhythm of the polonaise ... in its provocative and aggressive aspect. The first theme is marked, "in movimento di valse": a waltz expressing sentiment and vulnerability." Tchaikovsky initially allows these two elements to peacefully contrast against each other. In the development section, where Western composers in the past had combined their themes by variation and transformation before restating them, Tchaikovsky throws his themes together essentially unchanged to clash "remorselessly." In the movement's coda, he changes the note values of the waltz "so that the structure of the polonaise and the first two thematic elements become fused."

== Later efforts ==
Later symphonies by Tchaikovsky
Work	Op.	Composed	Premiered
Symphony No. 4	36	1877–1878	1878 (Moscow)
Manfred Symphony	58	1885	1886 (Moscow)
Symphony No. 5	64	1888	1888 (St Petersburg)
Symphony in E-flat	79 posth.	1892	(sketch, not publicly performed during the composer's lifetime)
Symphony No. 6	74	1893	1893 (St Petersburg)

=== Symphony No. 4 ===
Brown calls the Fourth Symphony a breakthrough work in terms of emotional depth and complexity, particularly in its very large opening movement. Although the composer himself complained about the formal "contrivances" and "artificiality" present there, Warrack maintains that in this symphony, Tchaikovsky found "the symphonic method that matched his temperament to his talents." The composer wrote to von Meck explaining that the symphony was patterned after Beethoven's Fifth in its use of an opening motif. The sheer violence with which this theme intrudes into various sections of the opening movement makes the fact it symbolizes Fate, to Brown, "wholly credible." At the same time, its use as a "structural marker" to hold this movement together, as noticed by Keller and music critic Michael Steinberg, shows it to have a musical as well as a dramatic function.

=== Manfred Symphony ===
Manfred, written between the Fourth and Fifth Symphonies, is also a major piece, as well as a demanding one. The music is often very tough, according to Brown. The first movement, which Zhitomirsky calls "profound in emotional and psychological import" and "closest of all to Tchaikovsky's creative temperament," is "completely original in form," according to Brown; here the composer all but abandons sonata form completely. The various musical challenges poses for the other movements, Zhitomirsky says, are "brilliantly coped with." Brown points out the second movement as a highlight, diaphanous and seemingly unsubstantial but absolutely right for the program it illustrates. Maes calls Manfred Tchaikovsky's "most romantic work. No other work is close to Berlioz, Liszt and—in sonority—Wagner." He also cites the work's "high quality" and "epic scope ... developed with the help of striking sound pictures." Warrack suggests that, of all Tchaikovsky's major neglected works, Manfred may be the one which least deserves this fate.

=== Symphony No. 5 ===
"Both in idea and exposition," Zhitomirsky writes, the Fifth Symphony is "a variation on the concept of the Fourth" but "is embodied with even greater unity and scope" than its predecessor, more even in its "expressive balance," according to Brown, more symmetrical in form and orthodox in its tonal progressions. Warrack calls Tchaikovsky's use of what he calls the "Providence" theme "both characteristic and ingenious" and "of a very different order from the battering brass motive [sic] associated with Fate in the Fourth Symphony." Maes adds that, through the use of this theme in all four movements, Tchaikovsky achieved "greater thematic cohesion" than in the Fourth. Only the finale remains, in Warrack's words, "unconvincing" and "too easy." Maes agrees on the finale's "hollow rhetoric" and quotes musicologist Edward Garden as saying the same. Brown says it "fatally mars a splendid symphony which earlier demonstrated how convincingly Tchaikovsky could now create a large–scale symphonic work of complete technical assurance and structural equilibrium, yet wholly his own in expression."

=== Symphony No. 6 "Pathétique" ===
The Pathétique, which John Warrack calls "a symphony of defeat" and the composer's attempt "to exorcise and drive out the sombre demons that had so long plagued him," is a work of prodigious originality and power; to Brown, this symphony is perhaps one of Tchaikovsky's most consistent and perfectly composed works. Maes claims this work "demonstrates most clearly" that Tchaikovsky treated the symphony as a general form not to be strictly followed. This holds most true, he says, with the slow finale, marked Adagio lamentoso, ending on a note of complete resignation in the basses—the first time a composer had dared to do so—while the opening movement "is more emotionally balanced than the reputation of the symphony would lead one to suppose."

=== Use of Waltz ===
Tchaikovsky remains the best-known of any symphonic composers to have turned to the waltz, something generally attributed to his love of ballet. The one in his Symphony No 5 serves as a refuge, providing comfort from the other movements’ surging emotions, but fast forward to his Symphony No 6 (Pathétique) and an element of grotesquerie has crept in: this waltz is written not in the usual three beats to a bar, but rather five beats.(www.sco.org.uk)

== Conclusions ==
Cooper maintains that if Tchaikovsky's symphonies were to be judged on strictly academic terms—in other words, on the same level as their Austro–German contemporaries and predecessors—they might "be considered fine music but poor symphonies." This line of thought, he maintains, is like architecture critics who believe that, "because no more beautiful and satisfactory churches than the Gothic cathedrals of the Middle Ages have been built since, therefore all churches should be built in the Gothic Style."

However, Cooper suggests, if they were to be "judged as a hybrid species" of symphony and symphonic poem, with inner workings more flexible and varied than sonata form might allow inhabiting the general four–movement structure to accommodate the musical and extra–musical demands sought not just by Tchaikovsky but also a number of other Romantic–age composers, they could be considered "completely successful." This, again in architectural terms, would be like when Gothic style was combined with the ideals of the Renaissance and the Counter-Reformation and a genuinely new style, the Baroque, resulted, "an organic development from the Gothic but as different in individuality as a child from its father." Soviet musicologist Boris Asafyev, in fact, calls the Tchaikovsky symphonies "dramatic" as opposed to the "non–dramatic" symphonies of Franz Schubert and Alexander Glazunov, as though he is discussing, if not two entirely different genres, then two separate variations on a common form.

Brown delineates the issue along cultural as well as formal lines. Russian symphonies are not German symphonies, he maintains, and the fact they may function along different parameters than their German counterparts does not make them any less valid on a musical or experiential level. Critics and musicologists agree universally that Tchaikovsky was not able to manipulate sonata form along the lines of a Mozart or Beethoven. This was a fact the composer himself bemoaned on more than one occasion. Though he received a Western European–style musical education, he still faced a native set of musical rules and traditions that did not conform at all to Western ones. Rather than ignore his native music and look Westward as his teacher Anton Rubinstein had done or forgo the West as much as possible as The Five did, he chose to face the problem from both sides head–on.

The truth is, Wood writes, despite the composer's occasional self-indictments, Tchaikovsky did master "form" as he actually understood and could manage it from a compositional level. Warrack calls Tchaikovsky's solution to large-scale composition "a compromise with sonata form." Wood maintains that what the composer called his "mountains of padding" were simply inseparable from his initial conceptions—from his process of starting with an extra-musical program and from there deducing musical motives of widely divergent moods and character to be somehow worked into one movement. The alternative method was allowing his second theme to arise after and at the same time from the first, may have never occurred to him. However, it may have been equally likely that Tchaikovsky's compositional method never occurred to Mozart.

While Tchaikovsky may have been incapable of writing absolute music, his real challenge was that while he was conscious of his formal shortcomings and continued striving for an unreached perfection, his actual ideal never really changed. Because the ideal never changed, the problems to which Tchaikovsky addressed himself never really changed, either. In this sense, it could be argued that he never really grew or matured. Nevertheless, Tchaikovsky discovered a method by which to circumvent what he perceived as formal shortcomings and put his emotional life to work in large-scale abstract structures.

== Recordings ==
Many directors performed and recorded all symphonies of Tchaikovsky. Notable recordings are:

- Mstislav Rostropovich recorded all symphonies with London Philharmonic Orchestra during the 70's
- Herbert von Karajan recorded all symphonies with Berlin Philharmonic during the 70's, it is available a box with 6 cd and 1 BRA (BluRayAudio)

== List of symphonies ==
- No. 1 in G minor, Op. 13, Winter Daydreams (1866)
- No. 2 in C minor, Op. 17, Little Russian (1872)
- No. 3 in D major, Op. 29, Polish (1875)
- No. 4 in F minor, Op. 36 (1877–1878)
- Manfred Symphony, B minor, Op. 58; inspired by Lord Byron's poem Manfred (1885)
- No. 5 in E minor, Op. 64 (1888)
- No. 6 in B minor, Op. 74, Pathétique (1893)
- Symphony in E♭ (sketched 1892 but not finished; reconstructed during the 1950s and subsequently published as Symphony No. 7) (Note: Because this work was discarded by Tchaikovsky and he rewrote parts of it as his Third Piano Concerto (which he completed on 3/15 October 1893, just three weeks before his death, making it his last completed work), it has generally not been included in the composer's canon.)

== Notes and references ==
=== Bibliography ===
- Bonds, Mark Evan, "Symphony: II. 19th century." In The New Grove Dictionary of Music and Musicians, Second Edition (London: Macmillan, 2001), 29 vols., ed. Sadie, Stanley. ISBN 0-333-60800-3.
- Brown, David, Tchaikovsky: The Early Years, 1840–1874 (New York: W.W. Norton & Company, 1978). ISBN 0-393-07535-2.
- Brown, David, Tchaikovsky: The Crisis Years, 1874–1878, (New York: W.W. Norton & Company, 1983). ISBN 0-393-01707-9.
- Brown, David, Tchaikovsky: The Final Years, 1885-1893, (New York: W.W. Norton & Company, 1991). ISBN 0-393-03099-7.
- Cooper, Martin, "The Symphonies." In Music of Tchaikovsky (New York: W.W. Norton & Company, 1945), ed. Abraham, Gerald. ISBN n/a.
- Holden, Anthony, Tchaikovsky: A Biography (New York: Random House, 1995). ISBN 0-679-42006-1.
- Keller, Hans, "Pyotr Ilyich Tchaikovsky." In The Symphony (New York: Drake Publishers, Inc., 1972), 2 vols., ed. Simpson, Robert. ISBN 0-87749-244-1.
- Macdonald, Hugh, "Symphonic Poem." In The New Grove Dictionary of Music and Musicians (London: Macmillan, 1980), 20 vols., ed. Stanley Sadie. ISBN 0-333-23111-2
- Maes, Francis, A History of Russian Music: From Kamarinskaya to Babi Yar (Berkeley, Los Angeles and London: University of California Press, 2002), tr. Pomerans, Arnold J. and Erica Pomerans. ISBN 0-520-21815-9.
- Schonberg, Harold C. Lives of the Great Composers (New York: W.W. Norton & Company, 3rd ed. 1997).
- Searle, Humphrey, "Liszt, Franz." In The New Grove Dictionary of Music and Musicians, First Edition (London: Macmillan, 1980), 20 vols., ed Stanley Sadie. ISBN 0-333-23111-2
- Searle, Humphrey, "The Orchestral Works." In Franz Liszt: The Man and His Music (New York: Taplinger Publishing Company, 1970), ed. Alan Walker. SBN 8008-2990-5
- Steinberg, Michael, The Symphony (New York and Oxford: Oxford University Press, 1995).
- Volkov, Solomon, tr. Bouis, Antonina W., St. Petersburg: A Cultural History (New York: The Free Press, a division of Simon & Schuster, Inc., 1995). ISBN 0-02-874052-1.
- Walker, Alan, Franz Liszt, Volume 2: The Weimar Years, 1848–1861 (New York: Alfred A. Knopf, 1989). ISBN 0-394-52540-X
- Warrack, John, Tchaikovsky Symphonies and Concertos (Seattle: University of Washington Press, 1969). Library of Congress Catalog Card No. 78-105437.
- Warrack, John, Tchaikovsky (New York: Charles Scribner's Sons, 1973). SBN 684-13558-2.
- Webster, James, "Sonata form." In The New Grove Dictionary of Music and Musicians (London: Macmillan, 1980), 20 vols., ed. Stanley Sadie. ISBN 0-333-23111-2
- Wiley, Roland John, Tchaikovsky's Ballets (Oxford and New York: Oxford University Press, 1985). ISBN 0-19-816249-9.
- Wood, Ralph W., "Miscellaneous Orchestral Works." In Music of Tchaikovsky (New York: W.W. Norton & Company, 1945), ed. Abraham, Gerald. ISBN n/a.
- Zhitomirsky, Daniel, "Symphonies." In Russian Symphony: Thoughts About Tchaikovsky (New York: Philosophical Library, 1947). ISBN n/a.
- https://www.sco.org.uk/news/the-waltz-goes-international#:~:text=Its%20inclusion%20in%20a%20symphony,to%20his%20love%20of%20ballet.
