= Princess Tarakanova (disambiguation) =

Princess Tarakanova (c. 1745-1775) was a pretender to the Russian throne.

Princess Tarakanova may also refer to:

- Princess Tarakanova (painting), an 1864 painting by Konstantin Flavitsky
- Princess Tarakanova (1910 film), Russian short film directed by Kai Hansen
- Princess Tarakanova (1938 film), La principessa Tarakanova, French-Italian historical film directed by Fyodor Otsep and Mario Soldati and starring Annie Vernay, Pierre Richard-Willm and Roger Karl
