= Light Without Heat =

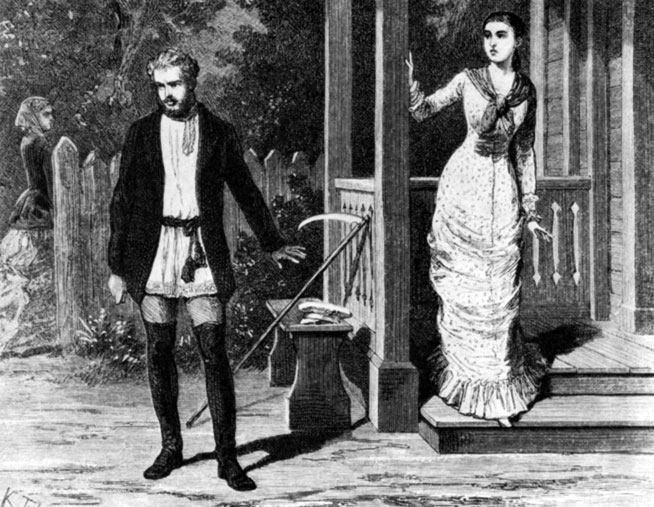
- Light Without Heat at Alexandrinsky Theatre, 1880. Nikolai Sazonov as Rabachev and Maria Savina as Olya. K. Brouge's illustration.
- Written by: Alexander Ostrovsky and Nikolai Solovyov
- Original language: Russian
- Genre: Realistic drama

Premiere
- Date premiered: 6 November 1880
- Place premiered: Maly Theatre in Moscow

Light Without Heat (Russian: Светит, да не греет, romanized: Svetit, da ne greyet) is a five-act play by Alexander Ostrovsky, based upon the play The Broken Happiness by his friend, a fellow dramatist Nikolai Solovyov, which Ostrovsky re-worked. It premiered at the Moscow Maly Theatre on 6 November 1880 (as a benefit for Mikhail Sadovsky who played Rabachev) and first appeared in print in 1881, in Ogonyok magazines (issues 6-10), as the Ostrovsky and Solovyov's joint work.

Modern Russian critics see it as a precursor to Anton Chekhov's The Cherry Orchard, both plays focusing on the Russian gentry at different stages of its decline or, in case of Chekhov's play, collapse.

== Background ==
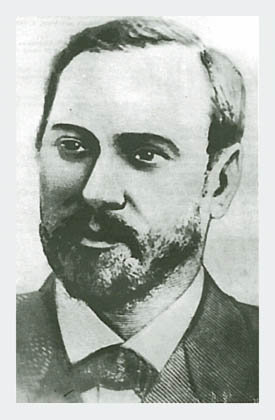
The playwright Nikolai Solovyov (1845-1898), Ostrovsky's friend and protégé, published 23 plays. Four of them, including Light Without Heat, he co-authored with Ostrovsky

In May 1880 Nikolai Solovyov approached Ostrovsky with the idea of writing a play together and suggested they should take as a basis his newly written piece called Broken Happiness (Разбитое счастье). In early August Solovyov brought the rough copy of his version to Shchelykovo, the Ostrovskys' estate. "I've just finished Act 1. We need not hurry. After the success of [The Marriage of] Belugin and The Wild One we have to put all our energy into this single work," Ostrovsky wrote him later this month, referring to the two plays they had recently co-authored and saw being staged.

What he did then was reject the original title, as well as the next one, Na Rodine (In the Native Place). On 2 October he wrote to Solovyov: "We cannot hit upon the proper title, what could this mean? Only that the play's leitmotif remains unclear even to ourselves. The plotline is still underdeveloped... and even the main question remains unanswered: what the play purports to say exactly?" He continued: "Ozerskoy (Note: That was how Rabachev's character was originally called. His friend's surname, Zavalishin, has been changed to Zaleshin by Ostrovsky) is a hot-headed man, not very intelligent and somewhat primitive. His love for Olya amounts to little more than a sensual instinct. Only in the Act 4 it dawns upon him all of a sudden that his life with Olya will be as dreary as Zavalishin's life with his wife. So there it is, the core of his personal drama. He is torn between two women: one superior to him, another inferior. He rejects the latter and gets rejected by the former."

Finally in this letter, Ostrovsky suggested another title: "The play should be called Light Without Heat. Renyova only lightens for them their swamp of a life, giving nothing at all. It highlights the play's main conflict. For Zavalishin and [Rabachev] she lightens their respective lives, but gives neither of them any warmth. The former, crashed by apathy, sinks into his personal mire. The latter, an impulsive one, literally throws himself off the cliff."

Of the total 182 pages of the play's handwritten manuscript everything starting with page 50 has been written by Solovyov. Ostrovsky has made numerous cuts and additions to this final draft, dealing mostly with the characters' language, to make it more laconic and expressive. He re-worked several episodes he considered vital either for the play's structure or for properly portraying its characters, as well as the finales of all the five acts. Completely re-worked by Ostrovsky was the central scene of the Act 3, depicting the emotionally charged dialogue between Rabachev and Olya.

== Characters ==
- Anna Vladimirovna Renyova, beautiful landowner, approaching 30. She arrives from Paris to her estate with a view to sell part of it and have some rest in the country from the high society pleasures she'd been enjoying to the full
- Semyon Semyonych Zaleshin, her middle-aged neighbour and Rabachev's friend. Infatuated with Renyova, he is driven to alcoholism by this all-consuming passion
- Avdotya Vasylievna, Zaleshin's wife
- Khudobayev, retired high-ranking state official, another victim to Renyova's charms
- Denis Ivanovich Deryugin, rich peasant, eager to buy the estate
- Boris Borisovich Rabachev, Renyova's young neighbour who thinks he's in love with Olya, but easily succumbs to Renyova's aggressive lovemaking
- Olya Vasilkova, a young girl, vulnerable, naive and idealistic, daughter to Renyova's estate's former manager
- Dasha, Renyova's maid, Ilyich, an old man, Renyova's serf; Stepanida, the latter's old wife

== Synopsis ==
Beautiful but worn-out Renyova arrives to her estate from Paris and amuses herself with trying to seduce Rabachev, her young, good-looking neighbour, thus ruining both his life and that of Olya, the girl he loves and was about to marry oo..

== Production history ==
External videos
- Светит, да не греет (fragment). Part of the 1974 Maly Theatre's The House of Ostrovsky production. Rufina Nifontova as Renyova, Tamara Torchinskaya as her servant Dasha, and Viktor Korshunov as Rabachev.

Light Without Heat was premiered in Moscow's Maly Theatre on 6 November [O.S. 25 October] 1880, as a benefit for the actor Mikhail Sadovsky who played Rabachev. Also performing were Nadezhda Nikulina (Renyova), Maria Yermolova (Olya), Olga Sadovskaya (Zaleshina), Vladimir Maksheyev (Zaleshin) and Nikolai Muzil (Khudobayev).

The general response to the premiere was negative. "That's what comes out of having no final rehearsal. The second performance will be better and the whole thing will just grow," wrote Ostrovsky to his friend, the actor Fyodor Burdin. He proved to be right. "The 4th performance was sold out, and the response was excellent," wrote Ostrovsky in a 20 November letter to Solovyov.

On 14 November Light Without Heat was performed at the Alexandrinsky Theatre in Saint Petersburg, as a benefit for Burdin who played Khudobayev. Among other actors involved were Antonina Abarinova (Renyova), Maria Savina (Olya), Nikolai Sazonov (Rabachev), Vladimir Davydov (Deryugin) and Alexander Nilsky (Zaleshin). "Here the cast was superb and the public greatly enjoyed it, the premiere was a furor and the second performance even better," Solovyov informed Ostrovsky.

In December 1894 Light Without Heat opened at the Society of Art and Literature. Cast included Konstantin Stanislavski as Rabachev and Maria Andreyeva who made her stage debut as Olya Vasilkova.
