= Princess Tarakanova (1910 film) =

- Russian: Княжна Тараканова
- Directed by: Kai Hansen; Maurice Maître
- Written by: Cheslav Sabinsky; Ippolit Shpazhinsky
- Starring: V. Mikulina; Nikolai Vekov; N. Aleksandrova
- Cinematography: Joseph-Louis Mundwiller; Toppi
- Production company: Pathé
- Release date: November 9, 1910
- Running time: 18 minutes
- Country: Russian Empire

Princess Tarakanova (Russian: Княжна Тараканова, romanized: Knyazhna Tarakanova) is a 1910 Russian short film directed by Kai Hansen.

Princess Tarakanova (1910)

== Plot ==
The film is based on the play Princess Tarakanova by Ippolit Shpazhinsky.

The story of the alleged daughter of the secret marriage of Empress Elizabeth of Russia, who allegedly died tragically during the flood in the casemate of the Peter and Paul Fortress, where she was transferred by the will of Catherine II after a life sentence.

== Cast ==
- V. Mikulina as Princess Tarakanova
- N. Aleksandrova as Catherine II
- Nikolai Vekov as Count Orlov
- S. Lazarev as Golitsyn
- Nadezhda Nelskaya as Francesca de Mechade
- Anatoly Rzhanov as Tolstoy
- F. Semkovsky as Samuel Greig
- Nikolai Vasilyev as Potyomkin

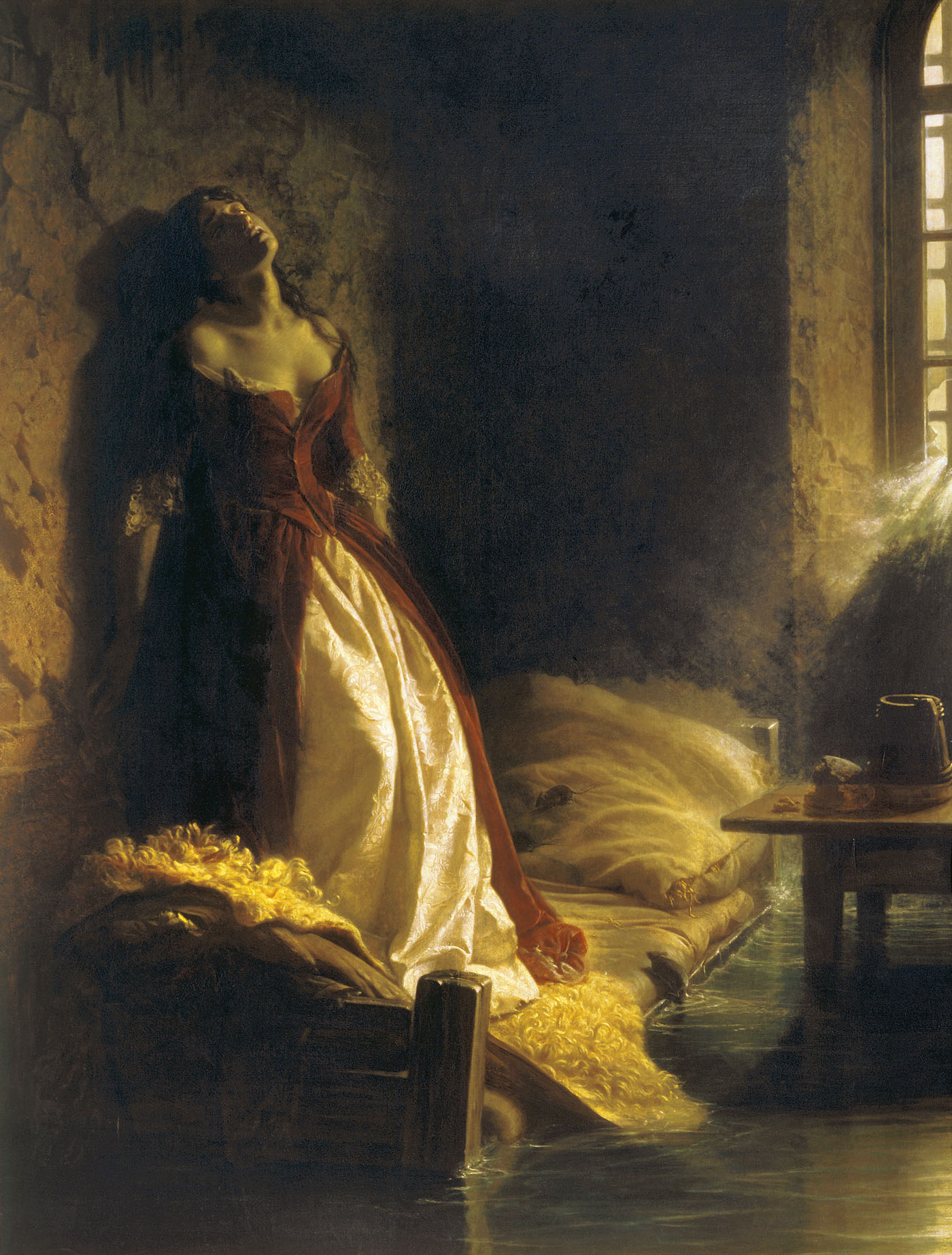
Princess Tarakanova, an 1864 painting by Konstantin Flavitsky

== Criticism ==
Before us is a series of historical figures. Little was missed in the sense of preserving the character of the era, life and costumes. This film was deemed a major event in the film market.
