= The Enchantress (opera) =

Opera by Pyotr Ilyich Tchaikovsky

- Opera by Tchaikovsky
- Cover of a 1954 recording
- Native title: Russian: Чародейка, Charodéyka
- Librettist: Ippolit Shpazhinsky
- Language: Russian
- Based on: Shpazhinsky's drama The Enchantress
- Premiere: 1 November 1887; Mariinsky Theatre, Saint Petersburg

The Enchantress (or The Sorceress, Russian: Чародейка, romanized: Charodéyka) is an opera in four acts by Pyotr Ilyich Tchaikovsky based on the libretto by Ippolit Shpazhinsky, using his drama with the same title. The opera was composed between September 1885 and May 1887 in Maidanovo (a village in the Klin district of Moscow) and was first performed in Saint Petersburg in 1887.

== Composition history ==
Ippolit Shpazhinsky's play The Enchantress was first produced in 1884 at Moscow's Maly Theatre, and it was soon staged more than any other play in Moscow or Saint Petersburg. The actresses Maria Yermolova and Maria Savina were prominent in the title role of Nastasya ("Kuma"). Modest Ilyich Tchaikovsky admired The Enchantress and one scene in particular. He pointed it out to his brother the composer, who proceeded to write a duet based on that scene. Pyotr saw the play himself in January 1885, after which he wrote to Shpazhinsky, asking him to convert the drama to an opera libretto. Shpazhinsky agreed, and the two men met that month to discuss the project, but the librettist's work was delayed by his divorce proceedings. When the libretto was finally completed in August, it was far too long and Tchaikovsky had to radically cut it. Even so, this opera was still the longest work he wrote.

== Performance history ==
The world premiere was given on 1 November 1887 [OS 20 October] at the Mariinsky Theatre in Saint Petersburg conducted by the composer and with stage direction by Osip Palechek (Josef Paleček), set designs by Mikhail Bocharov; and costume designs by E. Ponomaryov. After one season it was dropped from the repertoire. The sets and costumes were sent to Moscow where the opera received a single performance on 2 February 1890 [OS]. There was a second production at the Bolshoi Theatre on 25 January 1916 [OS], but this remained in the repertoire only until the end of the year. A third production at the Bolshoi in 1958 received 49 performances and remained in the repertoire until 1965. The British premiere was given by New Sussex Opera in May 1996 as part of the Brighton Festival. The latest production at the Bolshoi was premiered in 2012 A new production of Charodeyka directed by Christof Loy opened the 2014/2015 season of Theater an der Wien on 14 September 2014 with Mikhail Tatarnikov conducting the ORF Radio-Symphonieorchester Wien. The French premiere was given in March 2019 at the Opera de Lyon conducted by Daniele Rustioni with Elena Guseva in the title role.

== Roles ==
Role	Voice type	Premiere cast 1 November 1887 (Conductor: Composer)
Prince Nikita Kurlyatev, the Grand Prince's deputy in Nizhniy-Novgorod	baritone	Ivan Melnikov
Princess Yevpraksiya Romanovna, his wife	mezzo-soprano	Mariya Slavina
Prince Yuriy, their son	tenor	Mikhail Vasilyev
Mamïrov, an old deacon	bass	Fyodor Stravinsky
Nenila, his sister, a lady-in-waiting to the princess	mezzo-soprano	
Ivan Zhuran, valet of the prince	bass-baritone	
Nastasya, nicknamed "Kuma", keeper of a wayside inn at a crossing of the Oka River, a young woman	soprano	Emilia Pavlovskaya
Foka, her uncle	baritone	
Polya, her friend	soprano	
Balakin, a guest from Nizhniy-Novgorod	tenor	
Potap, a merchant guest	bass-baritone	
Lukash, merchant guest	tenor	
Kichiga, a pugilist	bass	
Payísy, a vagabond in the guise of a monk	character tenor	
Kudma, a sorcerer	baritone	
Chorus, silent roles: Maidens, guests, police officers, serfs, huntsmen, skomorokhi, people

== Instrumentation ==
Source: Tchaikovsky Research

- Strings: Violins I, Violins II, Violas, Cellos, Double Basses
- Woodwinds: 3 Flutes (3rd doubling Piccolo), 2 Oboes, Cor Anglais, 2 Clarinets (B-flat, C, A), 2 Bassoons
- Brass: 4 Horns (F), 2 Cornets (B-flat), 2 Trumpets (B-flat), 3 Trombones, Tuba
- Percussion: Timpani, Triangle, Tambourine, Military Drum, Cymbals, Bass Drum, Tam-tam
- Other: Harp
- On/Offstage: 4 Horns (off)

== Synopsis ==
Time: The last quarter of the 15th century

Place: Nizhny Novgorod and its vicinity

The action takes place at the last quarter of the 15th century at a tavern and brothel near Nizhny Novgorod. Nastasya (Kuma), the charming owner of the inn, has made herself an enemy in rejecting the devious Mamïrov, the right-hand man of the local governor Nikita Danilovich Kurlyatev. He spreads the gossip that Nastasya is an enchantress, and every man whom she meets falls for her. Yuriy, Nikita's son, begins to frequent the inn, as does his father, who falls madly in love with Nastasya (without any success), who threatens her that he will reach his goal by whatever means. Mamïrov confronts Nikita's wife, Yevpraksiya, with the truth, while her son – not yet personally involved with Nastasya – swears to avenge his mother. While confronting Nastasya he learns that it is he whom she loves. They both plan to flee during the night not knowing that, by now, Mamïrov has worked out an elaborate plot to wreak his revenge on Nastasya as well as on Nikita and his family with devastating effect.

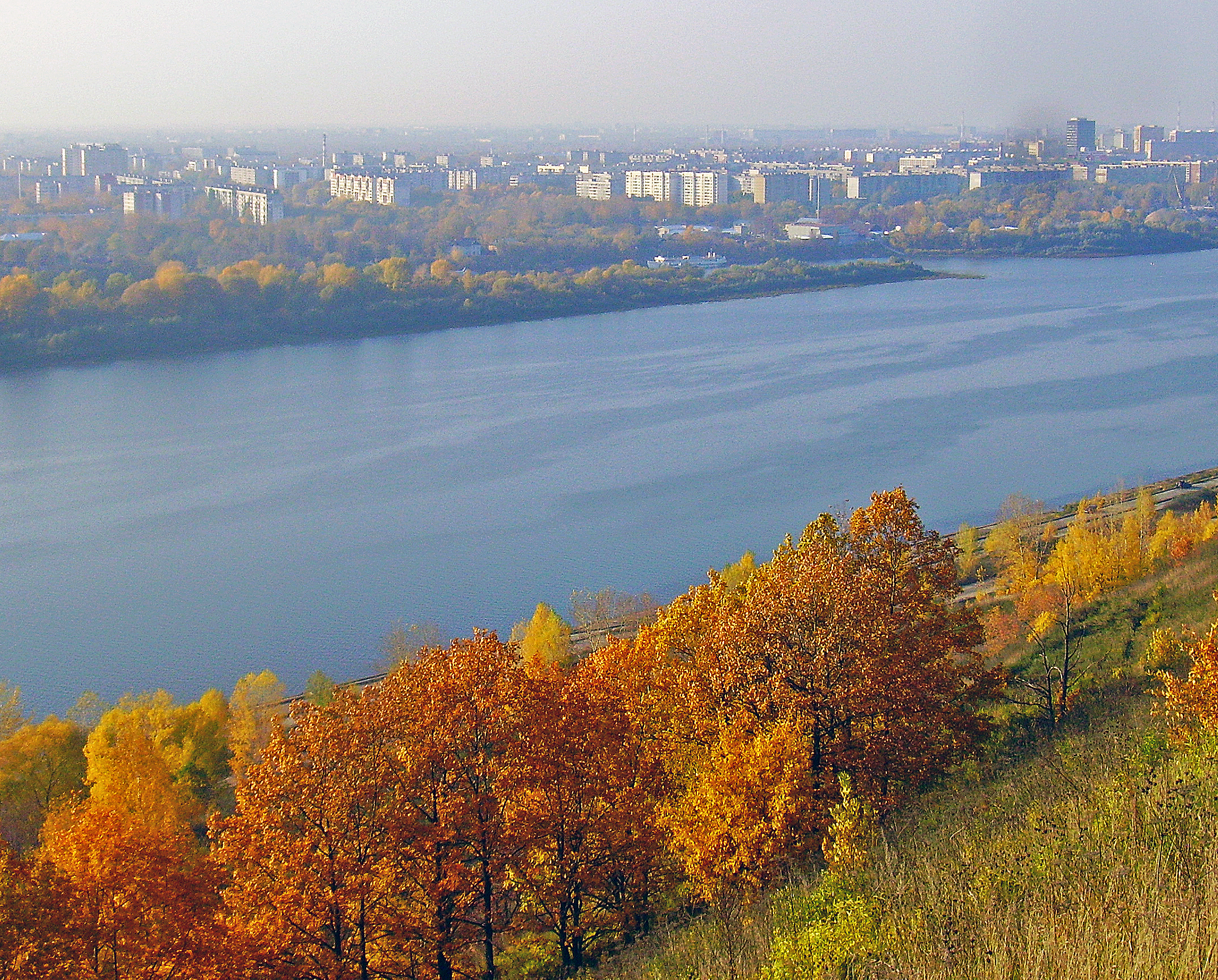
The city of Nizhny Novgorod, seen beyond the Oka River.

Introduction

=== Act 1 ===
Folk Scene (No. 1)
Folk Scena (No. 2)
Chorus of Guests & Scene (No. 3)
Scene (No. 4)
Kuma's Arioso (No. 4a)
Folk Chorus & Scene (No. 5)
Scene (No. 6)
Decimet & Chorus a cappella (No. 7a)
Scene & Chorus (No. 7b)
Dance of the Tumblers (No. 7c)

=== Act 2 ===
Entr'acte
Scene & Princess's Arioso (No. 8)
Scene & Duet (No. 9)
Scene (No. 10)
Scene (No. 11)
Prince's Arioso (No. 11a)
Scene: Prince with the Princess (No. 12)
Folk Scene (No. 13)
Finale (No. 14)

=== Act 3 ===
Scene & Duet (No. 15)
Scene (No. 16)
Scene (No. 17)
Duet (No. 17a)

=== Act 4 ===
Entr'acte
Scene with Chorus (No. 18)
Scene & Duet (No. 19)
Scene (No. 20)
Kuma's Arioso (No. 20a)
Scene & Duet (No. 21)
Scene & Quartet (No. 22)
Finale (No. 23)

== Versions by other hands ==
In the Soviet Union, the opera was staged again with a new version of the libretto by Sergey Gorodetsky after Ippolit Shpazhinsky on 22 March 1941 in Leningrad (St Petersburg).

== Recordings ==
- 1954, Natalya Sokolova (Nastasya), Mikhail Kiselyov (Prince Kurlyatev), Vera Borisenko (Princess Yevpraksiya), Georgiy Nelepp (Prince Yuriy), Aleksey Korolyov (Mamïrov), Anna Matyushina (Nenila), Mikhail Skazin (Ivan Zhuran), Anatoly Tikhonov (Foka), Vera Gradova (Polya), Sergey Sladkopevtsev (Balakin), Leonid Khachaturov (Potap), Aleksey Usmanov (Lukash), Gennady Troitsky (Kichiga), Pavel Pontryagin (Payisy), Pavel Korobkov (Kudma), Moscow Philharmonia State Orchestra, Radio USSR chorus, Samuil Samosud (conductor)
- 1978, Rimma Glushkova (Natasya, the enchantress), Oleg Klenov (Prince Kurlyatev), Lyudmila Simonova (Princess Yevpraksiya), Lev Kuznetsov (Prince Yuriy), Yevgeny Vladimirov (Mamirov), Nina Derbina (Nenila), Boris Dobrin (Ivan Zhuran), Pyotr Gluboky (Foka), Galina Molodtsova (Polya), Vladimir Makhov (Balakin), Sergei Strukachev (Potap), Lev Eliseyev (Lukash), Vladimir Matorin (Kichiga), Andrei Sokolov (Payisy), Viktor Ribinsky (Kudma), Moscow Radio Symphony Orchestra and Chorus, Gennady Provatorov (conductor)
- VHS 1984 (DVD 2010), Larissa Zyryanova (Nastasya, the enchantress), Vladimir Stepanov (Prince Kurlyatev), Lyudmila Korzhakova (Princess Yevpraksiya), Vadim Valyuta (Prince Yuriy), Alexander Pravilov (Mamirov), A. Perfilova (Nenila), E. Sedov (Ivan Zhuran), Dimitri Sukhanov (Foka), L. Lebedovskaya (Polya), N. Bogutsky (Payisy), A. Burlatsky (Balakin), M. Sanotsky (Potap), Mikhail Larin (Lukash), A. Perfilov (Kichiga) Nizhegorodsky State Academic Theatre of Opera and Ballet, Pavel Reznikov.
- 2024 Blu-Ray/DVD, Recorded 2022.12.30 live in Frankfurt, Opernhaus. Asmik Grigorian (Kuma); Iain MacNeil (Prince); Claudia Mahnke (Princess); Alexander Mikhailov (Yury); Frederic Jost (Mamyrov/Kudma); Zanda Švēde (Nenila); Abernethy, Jonathan (Balakin); McCown, Michael (Paysy); Volle, Dietrich (Foka); Kang, Pilgoo (Potap); Yende, Nombulelo (Polya); Abildin, Kudaibergen (Lukash); Baldvinsson, Magnús (Kichiga); Smiljanić, Bozidar (Zhuran). Frankfurt Opera and Museum Orchestra; Frankfurt Opera Chorus. Vasily Barkhatov (stage director), Valentin Uryupin (conductor); BR Naxos NBD 0180 V [2024] Naxos NYDX 50352 [2024] DVD Naxos 2110768/9 [2024].
