= Vladimir Maksheyev =

Russian actor

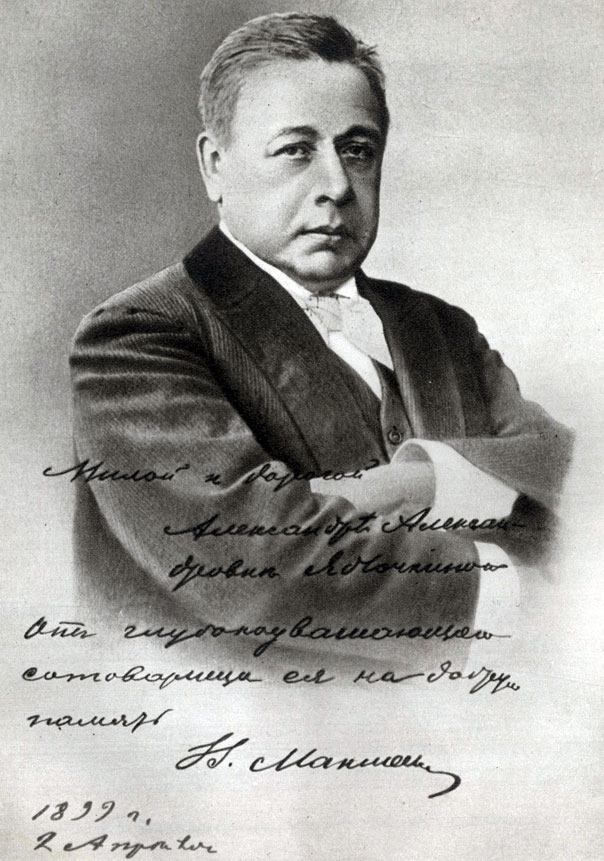
- Maksheyev in 1899, with autograph, addressed to A. Yablochkina
- Born: Vladimir Alexandrovich Maksheyev; Владимир Александрович Макшеев; 28 May 1843; Helsingfors, Grand Duchy of Finland, Russian Empire
- Died: 22 March 1901 (aged 57); Moscow, Russian Empire
- Occupation: Stage actor

Vladimir Alexandrovich Maksheyev (Russian: Владимир Александрович Макшеев; 28 May 1843 – 22 March 1901) was a Helsingfors-born male stage actor in the Russian Empire, associated with the Moscow's Maly Theatre.

== Life ==
A Voronezh Cadet Academy's alumnus, Maksheyev started out as an amateur actor in the Moscow-based Shepelev troupe as well as the Artistic Circle. Upon the retirement from the military service, he joined the Medvedev Troupe in Kazan (1870–1871), then worked in Saratov, Kursk, Tula and later several Moscow collectives, before joining the Maly in 1874 to stay there for the rest of his life. His best-known parts were Rispolozhensky (It's a Family Affair-We'll Settle It Ourselves by Alexander Ostrovsky, 1874), Rasplyuyev (Krechinsky's Wedding by Aleksandr Sukhovo-Kobylin, 1874), Arkhip (The Major's Wife, by Ippolit Shpazhinsky, 1878), Varlaam (Boris Godunov, by Alexander Pushkin, 1880), Migayev (Talents and Admirers, by Ostrovsky, 1881), The Mayor (Revizor by Nikolai Gogol, 1883), and Vosmibratov (The Forest by Ostrovsky, 1895).
