= Alexei Razumovsky =

Ukrainian-born Russian Registered Cossack (1709–1771)

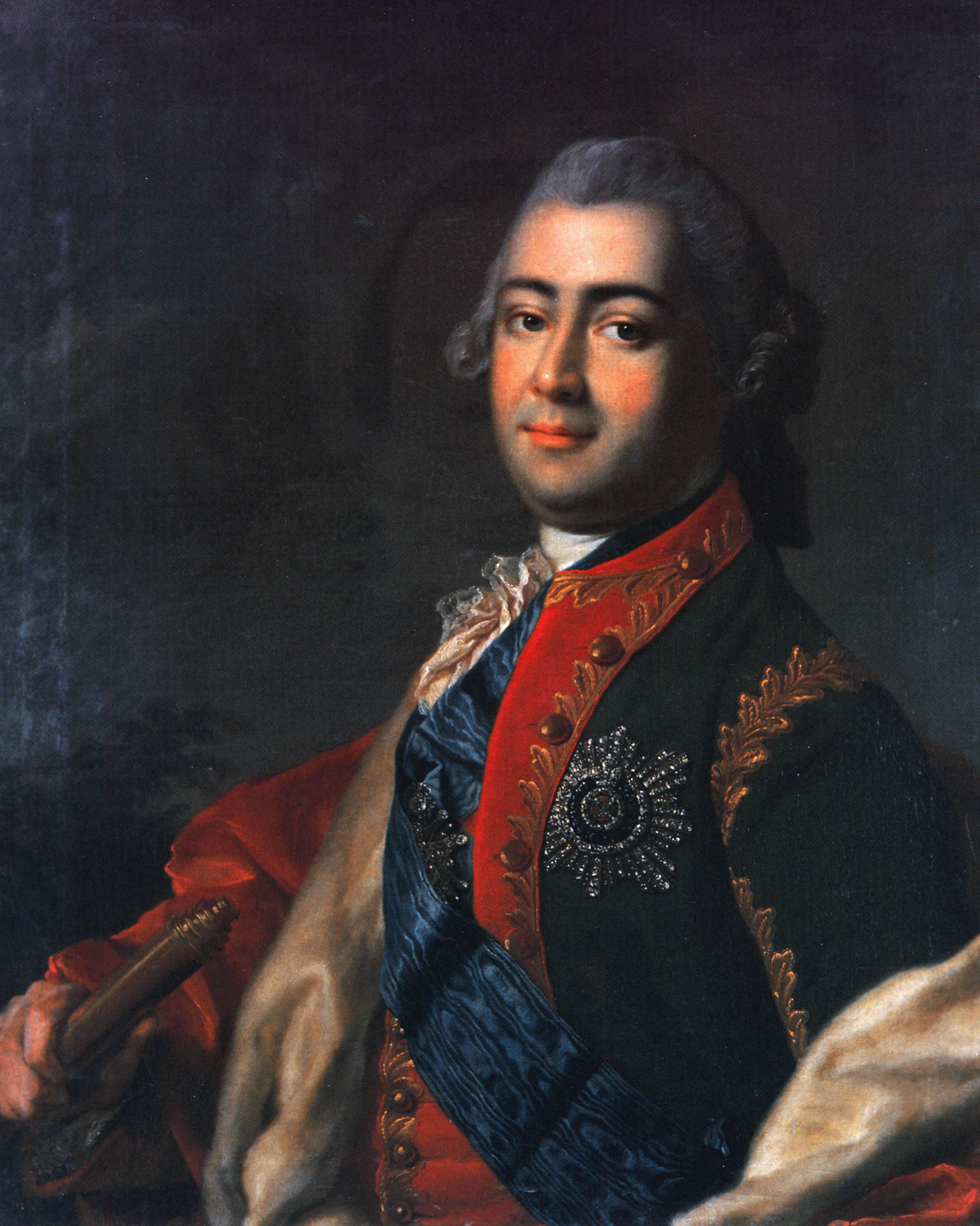
Count A. G. Razumovsky

Count Alexei Grigorievich Razumovsky (Russian: Граф Алексе́й Григо́рьевич Разумо́вский, Ukrainian: Граф Олексій Григорович Розумовський; 1709–1771) was a Ukrainian-born Russian Registered Cossack who rose to become the lover and, supposedly, morganatic spouse of Empress Elizabeth Petrovna of Russia. A member of the House of Razumovsky, he survived Elizabeth. The matter of any children they may have had together is unresolved.

== Early life ==
Alexei Grigorievich Razumovsky was born as Alexei (or Oleksiy) Rozum on 17 March 1709 (NS: 28 March) on Lemeshi, a farm in the area of Chernigov Regiment, Tsardom of Russia (now Ukraine), to the family of a registered Ukrainian Cossack, Gregory Rozum. In his youth he was a shepherd and he was taught to read and write by a rural sexton. Having a fine voice, he sang in the choir at the village church. In 1731, Colonel Vyshnevsky, one of empress Anna Ivanovna's courtiers, while passing through the village on his way back to the Russian capital from a mission to Hungary, was impressed with his vocal ability, and took him to Saint Petersburg where he joined the choir of the Russian palace chapel as Alexei Grigoriev.

Razumovsky was handsome, which, along with his vocal talents, captivated Elizabeth Petrovna, who brought him to the imperial court in 1732. With the deportation of Elizabeth's then favourite, Alexis Shubin, Razumovsky became her favorite. After losing his voice, he was accepted in the post of the court bandura player, and then the manager of one of Elizabeth's mansions. He received the rank of the hof-quartermeister; and actually supervised Elizabeth's court. During the period of Anna Leopoldovna's reign he was made a Kamer-Junker.

== Night Emperor ==
Razumovsky played an important role in the palace revolution of 25–26 November 1741 (NS 6–7 December), which brought about Elizabeth Petrovna's accession to the throne. On 30 November (NS 11 December) he was appointed as a chamberlain with the rank of a general-lieutenant. On the coronation day (25 April (NS: 6 May) 1742) he was made a Hofmarschall. Other honours bestowed on him included the Order of Saint Andrew and the Order of Alexander Nevsky, as well as being awarded numerous estates in Moscow and elsewhere.

Two years later in 1744, he received the comital title Reichsgraf (рейхграф in Russian) from the Holy Roman Emperor Charles VII and he was made a count in Russia in the same year. In 1745 he became the captain-lieutenant of the life-guards, and in 1748 he became the lieutenant-colonel of life-guards. On 5 September (NS: 16 September) 1756 he received the rank of field marshal. During Elizabeth Petrovna's reign he kept an exclusive position at court (though in his last years he was rivaled by the younger Ivan Shuvalov); in 1744, the empress visited his native village and met members of his family. Razumovsky's apartments in the Summer Palace directly adjoined to Elizabeth's apartments, and he had constant access to her.

Razumovsky was not interested in politics, but he quite often supported chancellor Bestuzhev. On his advice, the office of Ukrainian hetman was restored and his younger brother Kirill Razumovsky was made a hetman of the Zaporozhian Host and president of the Russian Academy of Sciences.

== Later years ==
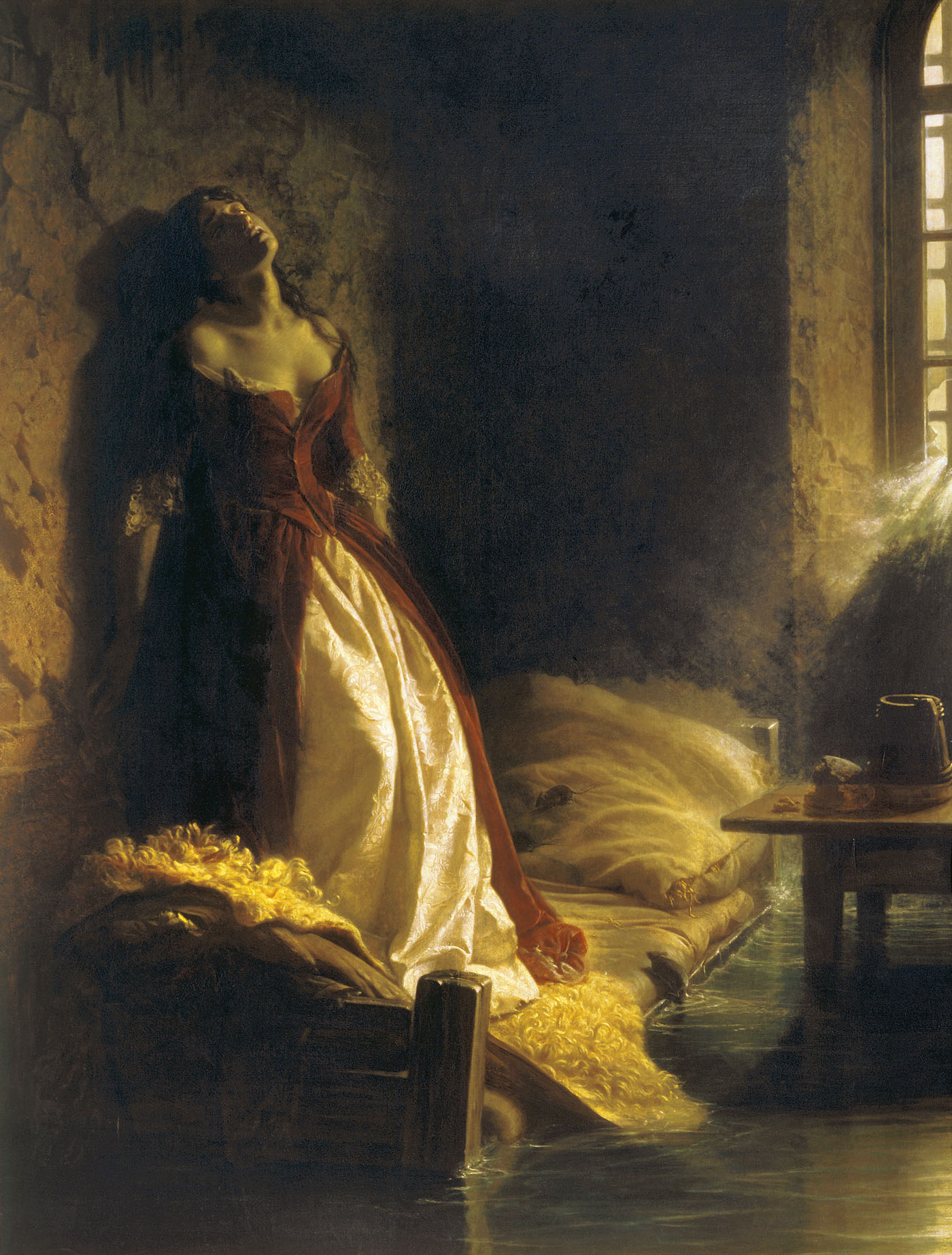
Princess Tarakanova, in the Petropavlovsk Fortress at the Time of the Flood (1864, Tretyakov Gallery).

Before her death, the empress made her successor Peter III promise not to offend her favorites. In 1762, Razumovsky submitted his resignation and moved from the Winter Palace to the Anichkov Palace, which had been presented to him by Elizabeth. After Catherine II's accession to the throne, Razumovsky refused the title of highness that was offered to him. At the empress's request, he destroyed all documents about his marriage with Elizabeth. He died on 6 July (NS 17 July) 1771 in Saint Petersburg and was buried in the Annunciation Church of the Alexandro-Nevskaya Lavra.

The question of Razumovsky and Elizabeth Petrovna's children remains unresolved and subject to many legends. The best known pretenders were two princesses Tarakanova, one of whom (Augusta Tarakanova) became a nun under the name Dosifeya. She died in 1810 and was buried in the Romanov family crypt; another (Elizabeth Tarakanova) was arrested in Livorno, Tuscany by Aleksei Grigoryevich Orlov and returned to Russia in February 1775. She was then imprisoned in the Peter and Paul Fortress, where she died from tuberculosis. The legend of her being drowned during the floods of 1777 served as the plot for a painting by artist Konstantin Flavitsky (1864, Tretyakov Gallery).

== See also ==
- Cossack Hetmanate
- Ukrainians in Russia
