= Sergey Aydarov =

Russian actor and theatre director (1867–1938)

Sergey Aydarov Сергей Айдаров
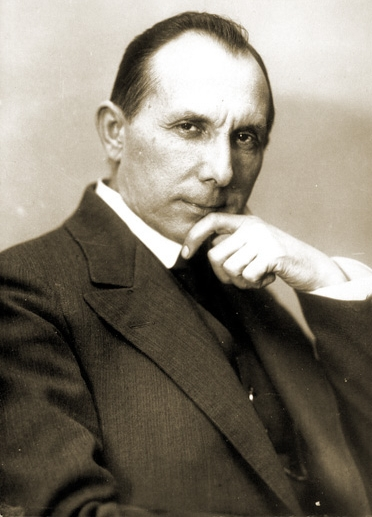
- Born: Сергей Васильевич Вишневский; 20 October 1867; Moscow, Russian Empire
- Died: 16 August 1938 (aged 70); Moscow, Soviet Union
- Occupations: Stage actor, theatre director

Sergey Vasilyevich Aydarov (Russian: Серге́й Васи́льевич Айда́ров, born Vishnevsky, Вишне́вский, 20 October 1867 – 16 August 1938) was a Russian and Soviet stage actor and theatre director, associated with the Moscow's Maly Theatre where he made his debut in 1898.

Aydarov was born in Moscow, in the Russian Empire. His most acclaimed parts were those in the plays by Alexander Ostrovsky (Krutitsky in Enough Stupidity in Every Wise Man, Vyshnevsky in A Profitable Position, Berendey in The Snow Maiden, Ivan Grozny in Vasilisa Melentyeva, Dulebov in Talents and Admirers), as well in Julius Caesar and The Tempest by William Shakespeare.

As a theatre director, Aydarov produced several plays, including Pyotr Gnedich's Before the Dawn (1901), as well as Ostrovsky's Vasilisa Melentyeva (1914) and A Busy Place (1915). In 1925–1930 he was the head of the Maly Theatre Yermolova Studio, later to be reformed into the Yermolova Theatre. He died in Moscow.
