= Talents and Admirers =

- Original language: Russian
- Written by: Aleksandr Ostrovsky
- Subject: Russian theatre
- Genre: Comedy

Premiere
- Date: 20 December 1881
- Place: Maly Theatre

Talents and Admirers (Russian: Таланты и поклонники, Romanized as Talanty y poklonniki) is a play by Alexander Ostrovsky premiered on December 20, 1881, in Maly Theatre. The author started working upon this 4-act comedy in August 1881 and finished it on December 6 of that year.

== Background ==
Ostrovsky wrote the play in the days when he was working for the Theatre reform commission. The problem facing the main character Negina was the one which the author himself knew only too well, according to the biographer Vladimir Lakshin. He often had to apply for help to rich men but thought such compromises necessary and considered he had to "bear his cross" in the interest of the theatre. According to the author, "the art is unable to stand for itself when facing rough brutal forces and has to find rich mentors."

The original title of the comedy was "Open Letters". According to the literary historian Ilya Shlyapkin, it has been read for the first time for the circle of brother Mikhail Ostrovsky's friends and was received coldly. This aggrieved Alexander Ostrovsky so much, he fell ill.

== Productions ==
Talents and Admirers was premiered on December 20, 1881, in Maly Theatre as the actor Nikolai Muzilh's benefice (he played Narokov). Negina was performed by Maria Yermolova, Domna Panteleyevna by Olga Sadovskaya, Meluzov by Mikhail Sadovsky, Velikatov by Alexander Lensky. The later Maly Theatre's productions (1885, 1895, 1900, 1902, 1912) featured among others Sergey Aydarov (as Dulebov), Alexander Yuzhin (Bakin), Konstantin Rybakov and Mikhail Klimov (Velikatov), Prov Sadovsky Jr. and Ivan Ryzhov (Meluzov).

In 1882 the play was staged by Alexandrinsky Theatre as a benefit for the actress Maria Savina who played Negina. The production also featured Varvara Strelskaya (Domna Panteleyevna), Alexander Nilsky (Dulebov), Marius Petipa (Bakin), Ivan Kiselevsky (Velikatov), Fyodor Gorev (Meluzov), Antonina Abarinova (Smelskaya), Vladimir Davydov (Narokov). The later productions featured performances by such actors as Yury Korvin-Kryukovsky (Bakin), Vasily Dalmatov (Velikatov), Nilolai Khodotov (Meluzov).

== Characters ==
- Alexandra Negina, young provincial actress
- Domna Panteleyevna, her mother, a widow, a 'simple woman' in her 40s
- Prince Irakly Dulebov, an 'old guard' kind of aristocrat, an old man
- Grigory Bakin, a man of 30, regional government's official
- Ivan Velikatov, rich owner of several estates and factories. A practical man of modest ways and good manners.
- Pyotr Meluzov, a young man, who, after just one year in University, awaits for getting a teacher's vacancy
- Nina Smelskaya, an actress, who is older than Negina

== Synopsis ==
Negina, a popular but poor actress, receives lessons from her fiancé Meluzov. Prince Dulebov, intends to take advantage of the girl's dire circumstances, so he suggests sponsorship, gets refused and becomes spiteful. Despite the latter's intrigues, Negina's benefice performance is triumphant and she receives a large sum of money, part of which Dulebov himself has to provide to keep his face. Still, the entrepreneur refuses to prolong her contract. One after another ecstatic admires come to her expressing their affection, among them Narokov, Naluzov and Velikatov. She leaves honest but dull Meluzov and goes away with rich Velikatov, motivated not by greed but by the desire to work on stage, the only thing she is really in love with.
