= Mikhail Tatarnikov =

Mikhail Tatarnikov is a Russian conductor who is known for his production of The Enchantress at the Theater an der Wien as well as The Gambler at the Opéra de Monte-Carlo. He was principal conductor and music director of the Mikhailovsky Theatre in 2012–2018. Represented by TACT Artists Management.

== Biography and first public appearance ==
Mikhail Tatarnikov used to study opera and symphony conducting at the Saint Petersburg Conservatory under guidance from Alexander Polishchuk. In 2006 he made his first appearance with the Mariinsky Theatre where he conducted a ballet based on Aristotles work called Metaphysics which was performed under Sergei Prokofiev's Second Symphony.

== Other performances ==
=== 2006-2012 ===
Since that year he works with both City of Birmingham Symphony and Danish National Symphony Orchestras as well as orchestras of Mariinsky and Mikhailovsky Theatres. Prior to all of it, he accepted invitations from the Orchestre Philharmonique de Radio France and Orchestre National Bordeaux Aquitaine. He also performed with both Rotterdam Philharmonic and Oslo Philharmonic Orchestras as well as Japanese Tokyo Symphony Orchestra and Gävle Symphony Orchestra of Gävle, Sweden.

Besides overseas performances he was a conductor of national orchestras as well, such as the Novosibirsk Philharmonic, National Philharmonic Orchestra of Russia and Russian National Orchestra, with the latest of which he traveled to Dresden and Philadelphia and accompanied Valery Gergiev as well.

=== 2013 and 2014 seasons ===
As of 2013 he has conducted such operas as Benjamin Britten's Billy Budd, Charles Gounod's Roméo et Juliette, as well as Tchaikovsky's Eugene Onegin and The Queen of Spades both of which were later performed at La Scala, Milan, and Opera de Bordeaux. The same year, he has conducted Antonín Dvořák's Rusalka at both the Bavarian State Opera and both Rotterdam Philharmonic and Saint Petersburg Philharmonic Orchestras. In 2014 his repertoire will include production of The Love for Three Oranges which will be performed by the Latvian National Opera as well as first ballet at La Scala theatre. For the first time of his United Kingdom visit which will be in March, he will conduct with Royal Scottish National Orchestra at the London Coliseum where the ballet from Mikhailovsky Theatre will perform.
