= Ippolit Shpazhinsky =

Ippolit Vasilievich Shpazhinsky (Russian: Ипполит Васильевич Шпажинский; 22 April [O.S. 10 April] 1848 – 15 February [O.S. 2 February] 1917) was a Russian playwright and poet. He is best known for his play The Enchantress (Чародейка), which Pyotr Ilyich Tchaikovsky adapted as his opera of the same name.

== Biography ==
Ippolit Shpazhinsky was born in Voronezh in 1848. He received a military education, and served for some years in an uhlan regiment. He resigned his commission to devote himself to writing plays. His first drama appeared in 1876, and he went on to write tragedies, psychological and historical dramas, comedies, and individual scenes. Many of these were staged at the state theatres in Saint Petersburg and Moscow, as well as in the major provincial theatres.

The Russian Theatre in Riga, the oldest Russian theatre outside Russia, opened on 2 October 1883, with the premiere of Shpazhinsky's play The General's Wife (Майорша, 1878).

That year, Shpazhinsky had provided a libretto for Vladimir Kashperov for his opera Taras Bulba. This was premiered at the Bolshoi Theatre in May 1887, but it was dropped from the repertoire after only four performances.

The Enchantress was first produced in 1884 at the Maly Theatre in Moscow, and it had seen more performances than any other play being staged in Moscow or St Petersburg. The actresses Maria Yermolova and Maria Savina were prominent in the title role. Savina in particular was dubbed "The Enchantress of the Russian Stage", after her appearances in the play. Vera Komissarzhevskaya was also known for her appearances in his plays.

The dramatist Modest Ilyich Tchaikovsky admired The Enchantress and one scene in particular. He pointed it out to his brother, the composer Pyotr Ilyich Tchaikovsky, who proceeded to write a duet based on that scene. Pyotr saw the play in January 1885, after which he wrote to Shpazhinsky, asking him to convert the drama to an opera libretto. Shpazhinsky agreed, saying there was no composer with whom he would rather collaborate, and the two men met that month to discuss the project. In the event, the librettist's work on the project was slow and was further delayed by his divorce proceedings. When the libretto was finally completed in August, it was far too long and Tchaikovsky had to radically cut it. Even so, the opera The Enchantress was still the longest work he ever wrote. Shpazhinsky's play The Enchantress was translated into French, German and Czech, as was The General's Wife. In the meantime, Tchaikovsky had become friendly with Shpazhinsky's estranged wife Yuliya, who had been forced by her husband to move to Sevastopol with their children. She and Tchaikovsky exchanged many letters of mutual support.

In May 1887, Shpazhinsky had offered Tchaikovsky another of his libretti, The Bayadere, based on Goethe's ballad Der Gott und die Bajadere. He had considered making it available to the French-born Russian composer Anton Simon, but felt Tchaikovsky's music was of greater quality. Tchaikovsky gave this idea some consideration, but eventually rejected it.

Although The Enchantress received mediocre reviews at its November 1887 premiere, Tchaikovsky liked Shpazhinsky's style and he approached him for another libretto, this time based on Alexander Pushkin's historical novel The Captain's Daughter, which the writer started in the spring of 1888. The composer abandoned this plan before doing any work on it.

In 1890, Shpazhinsky became President of the Society of Russian Dramatists and Opera Composers.

In 1900, he offered Nikolai Rimsky-Korsakov the same libretto that Tchaikovsky had rejected in 1887, The Bayadere, only to have it rejected again.

Other works by Shpazhinsky include:

- Вопрос жизни (The Question of Life)
- Княжна Тараканова (Princess Tarakanova; 1904, based on the character of Princess Tarakanoff)
- Лакомый кусочек
- Упрёки прошлого
- Лёгкие средства (1879)
- Фофан (1880)
- Кручина (1882)
- Где любовь, там и напасть (1882)
- Княгиня Курагина (1887)
- В старые годы (1888)
- Жертва (1892)
- Тёмная сила (1895)
- В забытой усадьбе
- Дело житейское
- Прахом пошло
- Питомка
- Предел
- Ложь, да правды стоит
- Вольная волюшка
- Луч
- Простая история.

He won the Griboyedov Prize for Two Fates (Две судьбы, 1898).

He died in Moscow in 1917, aged 68.

His son Yuri was an artist whose works appeared in the Tretyakof Gallery. He also had two children out of wedlock, one of whom, Boris Raikov, became a professor of history.
