= Princess Tarakanova =

Pretender to the Russian throne

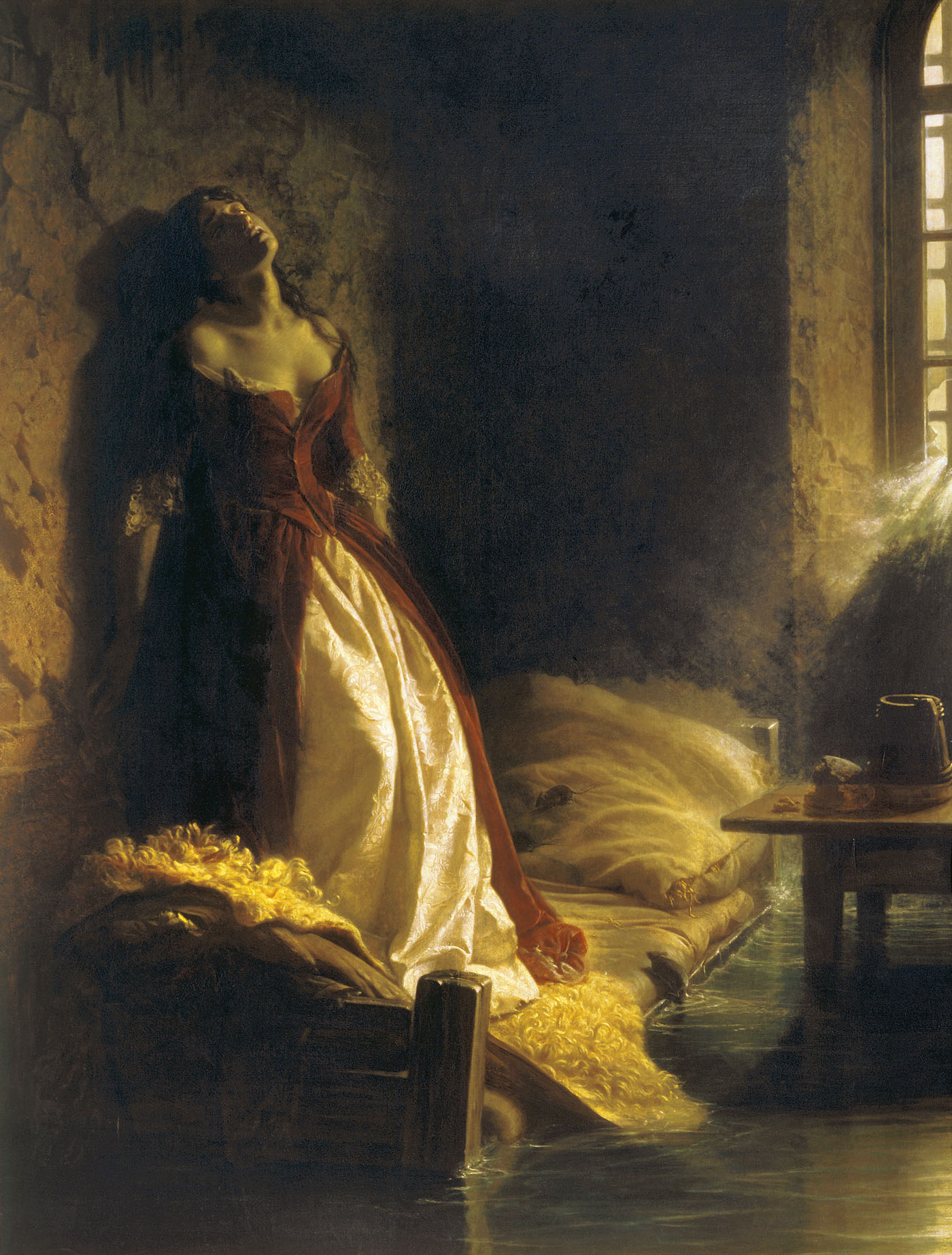
Princess Tarakanova, an 1864 painting by Konstantin Flavitsky, depicts the legend that this impostor was killed by a 1777 flood. In reality, she had died in 1775.

Princess Tarakanova (c. 1745 – December 15 [O.S. December 4] 1775) was a pretender to the Russian throne during the reign of Catherine II. She styled herself, among other names, Knyazhna Yelizaveta Vladimirskaya (Princess Elizabeth of Vladimir), Fräulein Frank, and Madame Trémouille. Tarakanova (tarakan is the Russian word for cockroach) is a later name, used only in entertainment (literature, theater, films, paintings), apparently on the basis of her relatives (from her father Prince Razumovsky's side) being the owners of the estate Daraganovka (Tarakanovka) in Ukraine - the place where she (apparently) grew up. In her own time, she was not known by that name.

== Life ==
Tarakanova claimed to be the daughter of Alexei Razumovsky and Empress Elizabeth of Russia, reared in Saint Petersburg. Though it has been suggested that she was born sometime around 1745–1750, even her place of birth is not certain, and her real name is not known.

The princess first appeared in Kiel in 1770. After Kiel she moved to Berlin, where she became a "Fräulein Frank" and lived there for some time until relocating to Ghent as "Fräulein Schell".

While in Ghent she began a relationship with the son of a Dutch merchant by the name of van Tours/van Toers. Racking up debt, she and her lover fled their creditors to London, where she became Madame de Tremouille (or Treymill). Her lover helped her secure a loan from local merchants. Unable to repay them, van Tours escaped to Paris, where he was joined by the princess, who in London had made an acquaintance with a Baron Shenk who escorted her to France.

Later aliases followed her travels throughout Europe, and included Lady Shelley, Countess Pinneberg, Countess Silwiski and Sultana Selime.

In Paris she met Marquis de Rochefort de Valkoura, who wanted to marry her. While she is said to have agreed to the marriage, in 1773 she was on the run again from creditors.

After this, she became mistress of Count Philipp Ferdinand of Limburg Stirum, apparently in the hope that he would marry her. While living at his castle in Franconia, she called herself Ali Emena/Ali Emmetie and presented herself as the daughter of a Persian satrap.

She also presented herself as Alina (or Eleanor), princess of Azov.

She eventually was arrested in Livorno, Tuscany by Alexei Grigoryevich Orlov, who had been sent by Empress Catherine II to retrieve her. Orlov seduced her, then lured her aboard a Russian ship and took her to Russia in February 1775. She was imprisoned in the Peter and Paul Fortress, where she was interrogated by Golitsyn, the governor of St. Petersburg. Golitsyn reported that "the story of her life is filled with fantastic affairs and rather resembles fairy-tales".

== Death ==
The princess Tarakanova died of tuberculosis on 4 December 1775. She was buried in the graveyard of the fortress.

A popular theory postulated that her death was faked and that she was secretly forced to take the veil under the name Dosifea. A mysterious nun of this name is recorded as having lived in the Ivanovsky Convent from 1785 until her death in 1810.

== Films ==
- A play written by Ippolit Shpazhinsky was the basis for the 1910 Russian film Princess Tarakanova.
- A 1930 French film Tarakanova in which she is played by Édith Jéhanne.
- A 1938 French-Italian film Princess Tarakanova with Annie Vernay as Princess Tarakanova and Pierre Richard-Willm as Count Orlov.
- In 1950, a joint UK/Italian movie titled Shadow of the Eagle (Italian-language version The Rival of the Empress) was produced about the seduction mission by Alexei Orlov of Princess Tarakanova, with Valentina Cortese portraying Tarakanova and Richard Greene in the role of Count Orlov. In this story, Tarakanova is portrayed as a real princess who is a threat to Catherine the Great both politically and in royal lineage, not a pretender to the throne of Russia. The story portrays Orlov as a betrayer of Catherine the Great, in that he allies himself with Tarakanova while claiming false allegiance to Catherine. The events in the film follow history authentically until the meeting of Princess Tarakanova and Orlov takes place, and the ending alters actual real-life events, in that Orlov rescues Tarakanova from prison in Russia in a daring raid and they live happily ever after.
- In 1990, an award-winning Soviet film production titled The Royal Hunt was released, directed by Vitaly Melnikov, based on a play by Leonid Zorin of the same title. It told the story of the life and adventures around Europe of Princess Tarakanova and the operation by Alexei Orlov to trick and capture her.
- She appears in Ekaterina TV series in Season 3: "Impostors", portrayed by Angelina Strechina.

== Sources ==
- Simon Sebag Montefiore, The Romanovs 1613–1918
