= Konstantin Flavitsky =

Russian painter

- Константин Дмитриевич Флавицкий
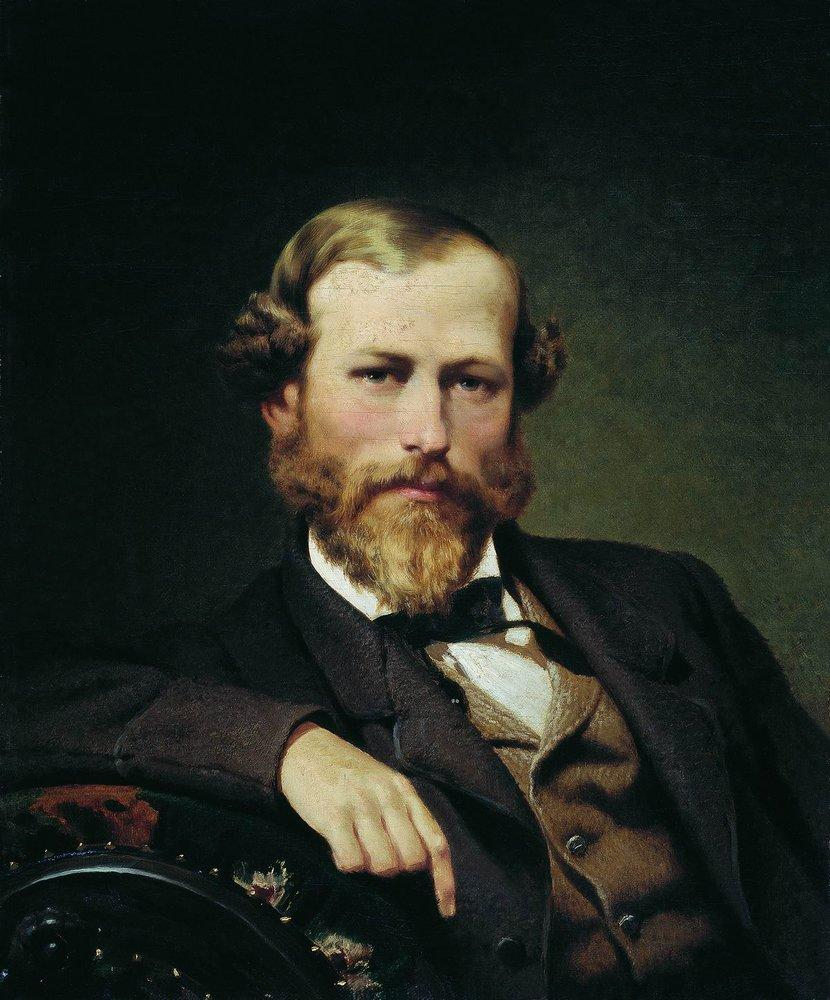
- Posthumous portrait by Fyodor Bronnikov, 1866, oils; Radishchev Museum, Saratov
- Born: 25 September [O.S. 13 September] 1830; Moscow
- Died: 15 September [O.S. 3 September] 1866 (aged 35); Saint Petersburg
- Resting place: Tikhvin Cemetery, Saint Petersburg
- Education: Imperial Academy of Arts (1855)
- Known for: History painting
- Notable work: Princess Tarakanova, 1864
- Awards: Big Gold Medal of the Imperial Academy of Arts (1855)
- Elected: Professor by rank (1864)

Konstantin Dmitriyevich Flavitsky (Russian: Константи́н Дми́триевич Флави́цкий; 25 September [O.S. 13 September] 1830 – 15 September [O.S. 3 September] 1866) was a Russian painter during the Late Romantic period, best known for his history paintings.

== Biography ==
Flavitsky received his art education at the Imperial Academy of Arts, and was a student of Professor Fyodor Bruni. Received silver medals from the Academy for drawings and sketches from life. In 1854, he was awarded a small gold medal for his painting The Court of Solomon. He graduated from the academic course (1855), receiving the title of the artist. He received a large gold medal from the Academy of Fine Arts for his work Jacob’s Children Sell His Brother Joseph, which allowed him to travel to Italy to study between 1856 and 1862, as a pensioner of the Academy.

He returned to Russia in 1862. The following year, he was recognized as an honorary free member of the Academy for the large painting Christian Martyrs in the Colosseum, commissioned by the Duchess of Leuchtenberg in Rome. At the exhibition in 1864, the painting Princess Tarakanova brought him the title of professor at the Academy of Arts and attracted the attention of art lovers and the public.

The artist died at the age of 35. His health was severely undermined by consumption. The disease developed in the conditions of the Saint Petersburg climate.

His most famous painting is Princess Tarakanova, in the Peter and Paul Fortress at the Time of the Flood based on the legend of the death of Yelizaveta Alekseyevna Tarakanova, the self-styled daughter of Aleksey Grigorievich Razumovsky and Elizabeth of Russia in her prison cellar during the flood in Saint Petersburg.

"In his art Konstantin Flavitsky adhered to classical traditions, the principles bequeathed by K. P. Bryullov. His creative heritage is not extensive and he is known primarily as the author of the painting Princess Tarakanova. The work is based on a legend from Russian history according to which Princess Tarakanova, who said she was the daughter of Empress Elizabeth and Alexei Razumovsky and laid claim to the Russian throne in Catherine the Great's reign, died in the Peter and Paul Fortress during the flood of 1777. Flavitsky depicts with great tragic power the suffering of this young woman facing certain death in a gloomy dungeon flooded with water, depicting her helplessness and despair most expressively."

== Works ==
Konstantin Flavitsky's works

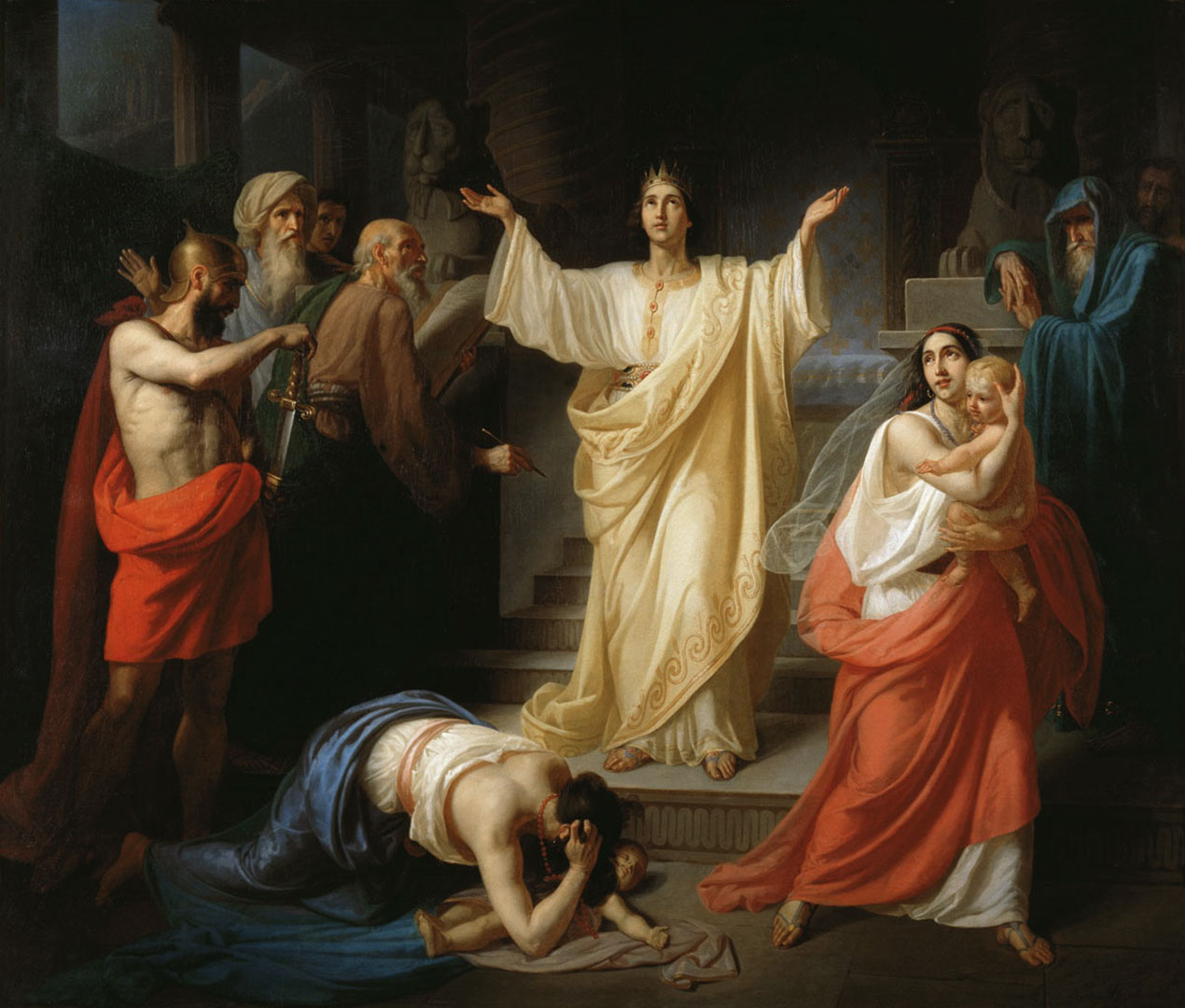
Solomon's Court

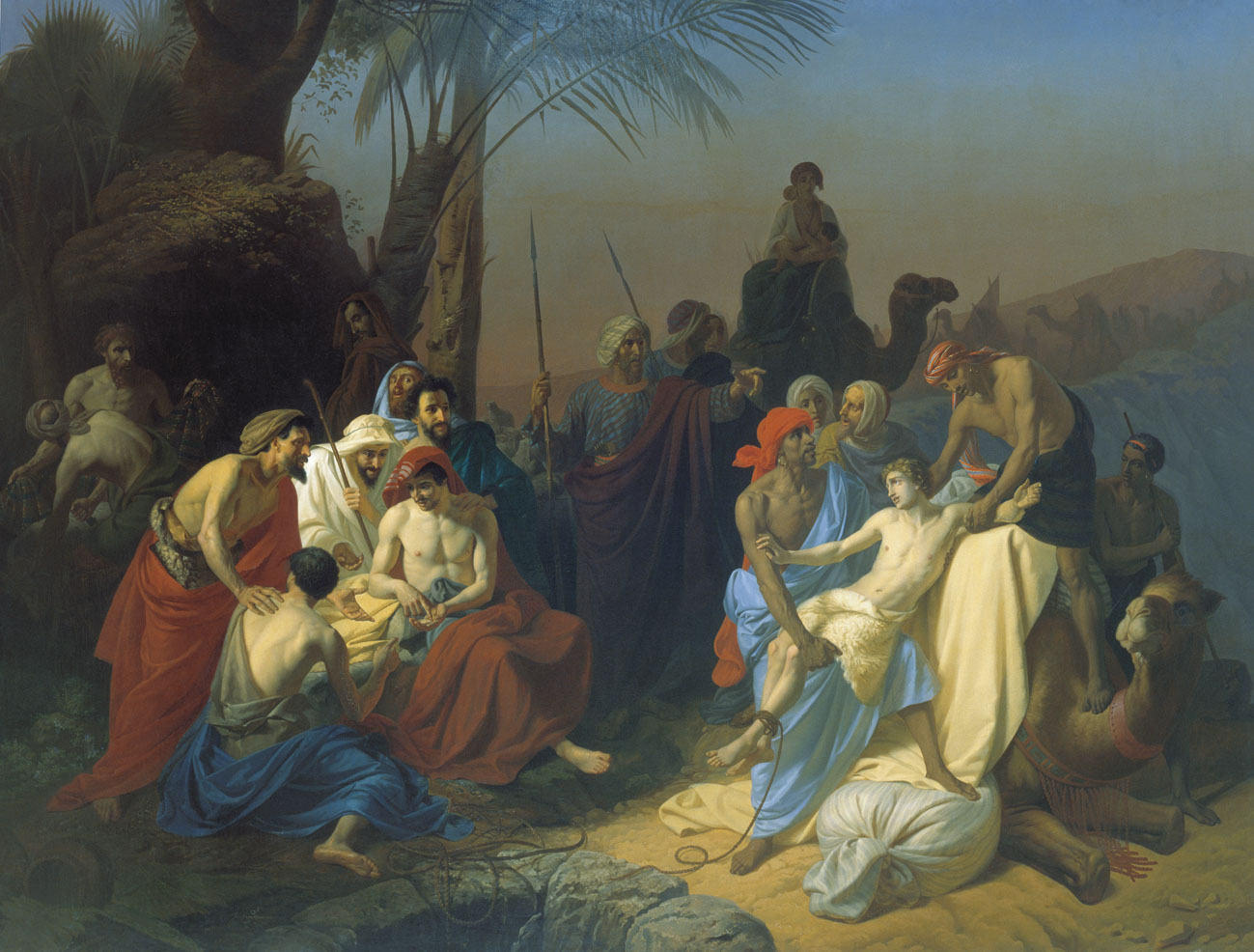
Jacob's children sell their brother Joseph

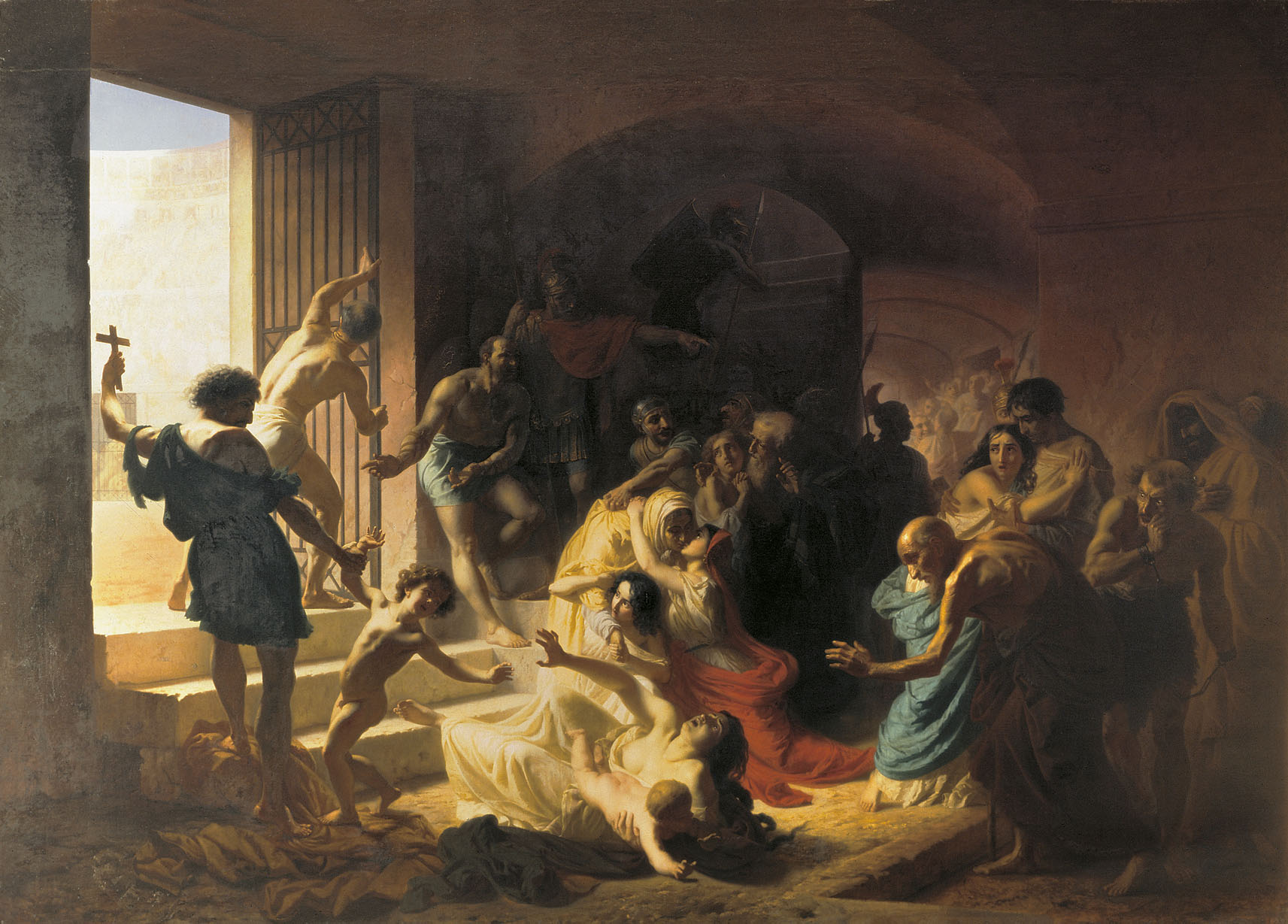
Christian martyrs in the Colosseum

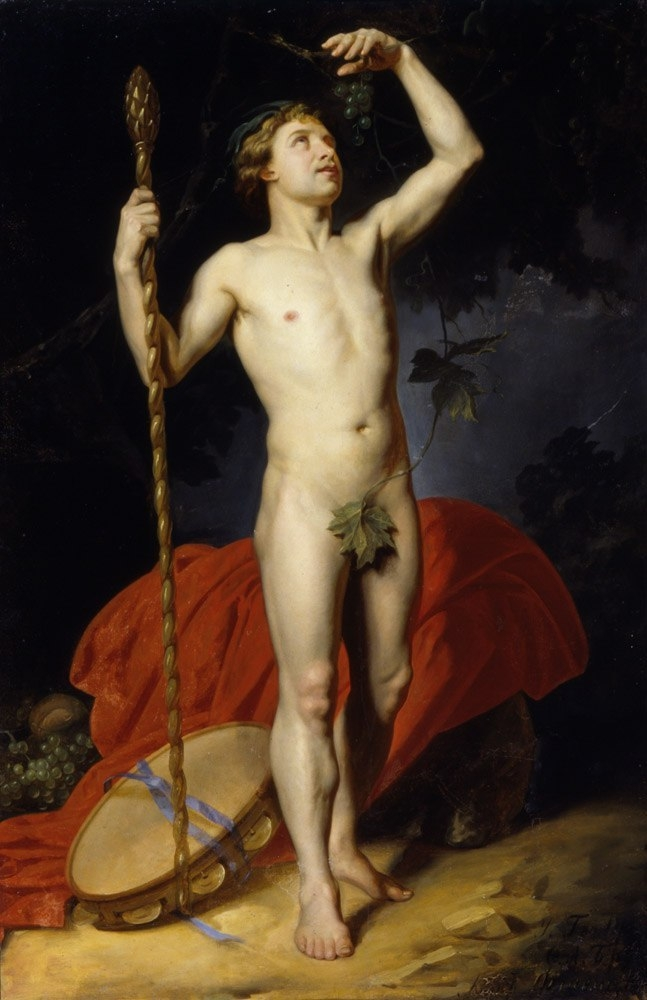
Bacchus

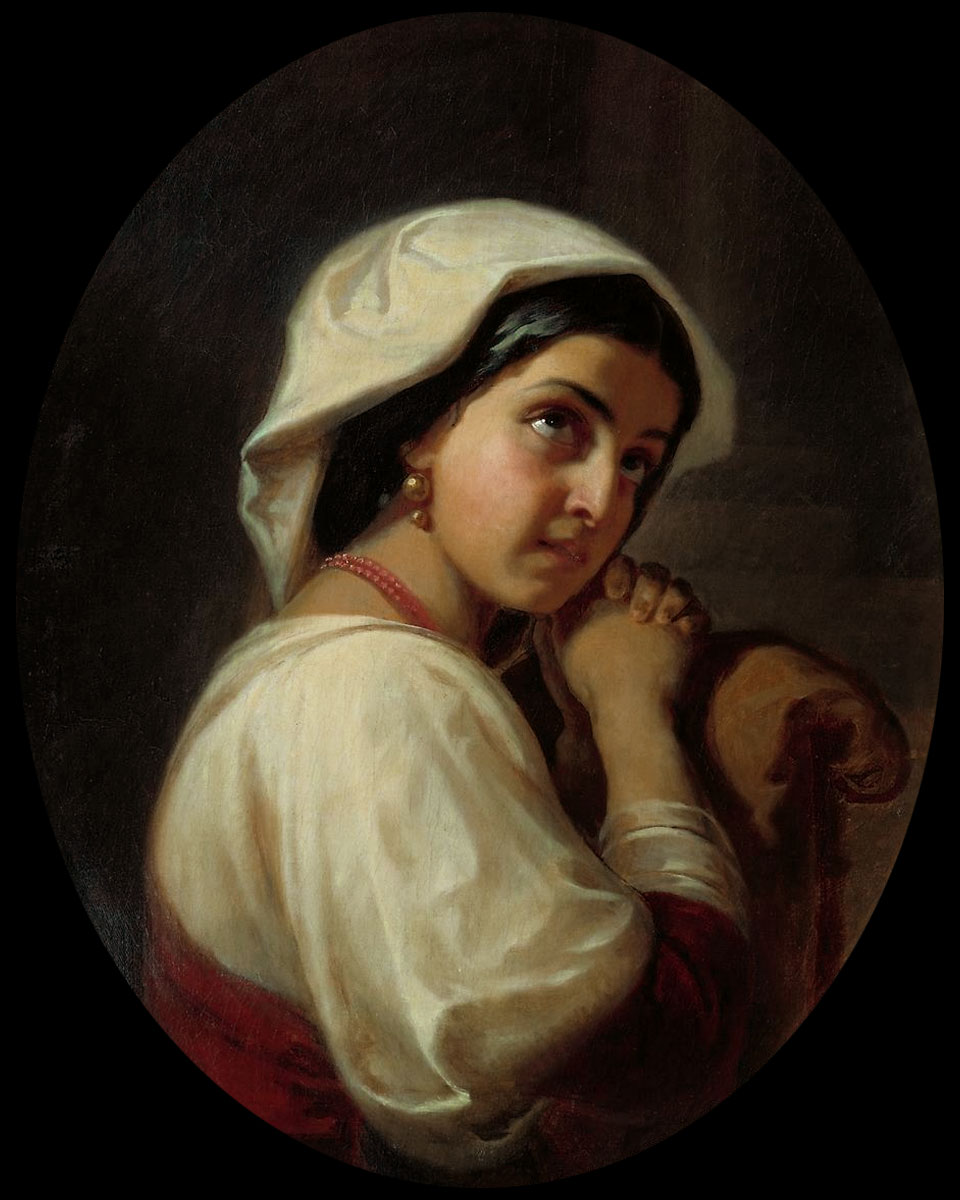
Italian girl

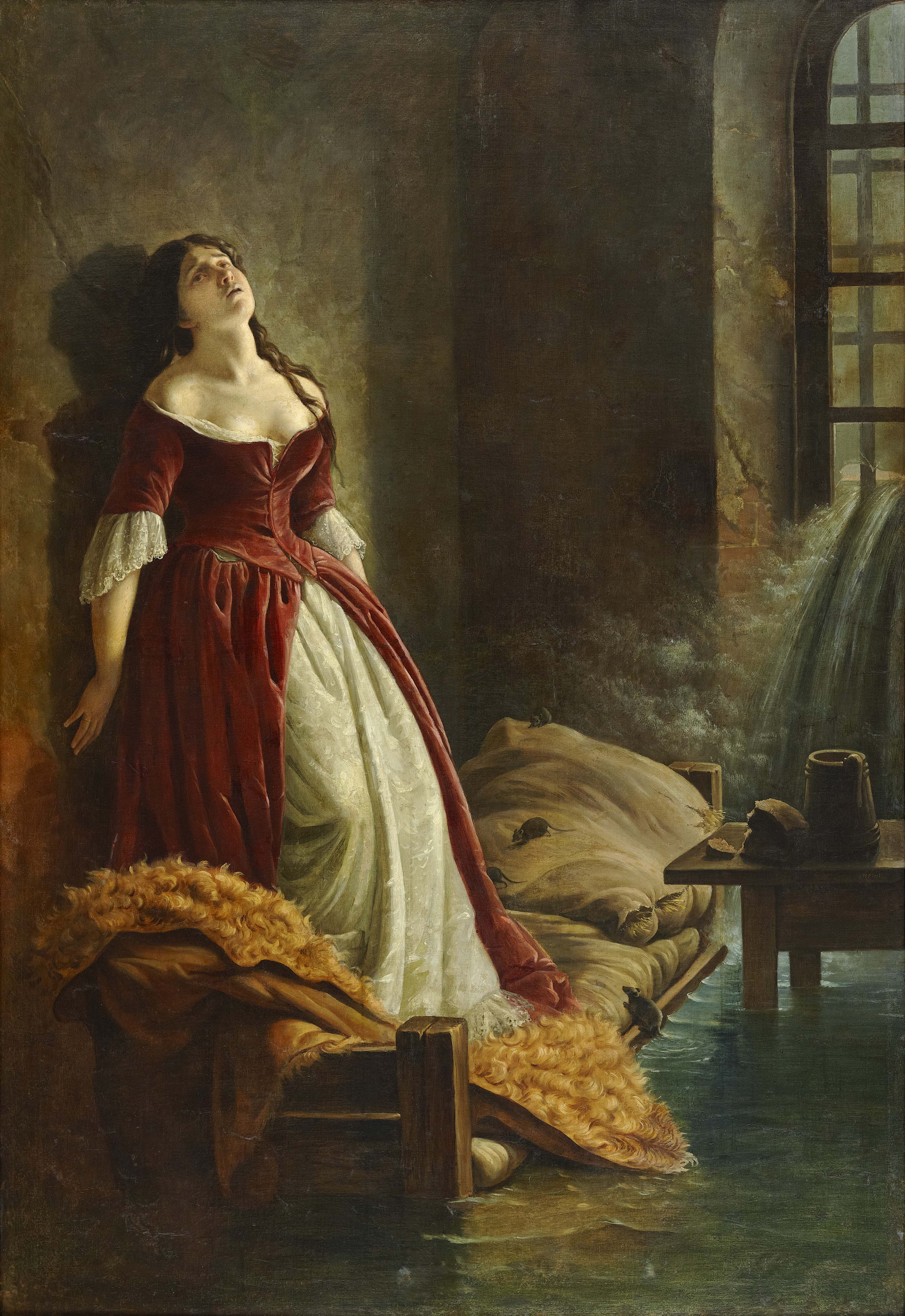
Princess Tarakanova, in the Peter and Paul Fortress at the Time of the Flood (earlier version from 1862)

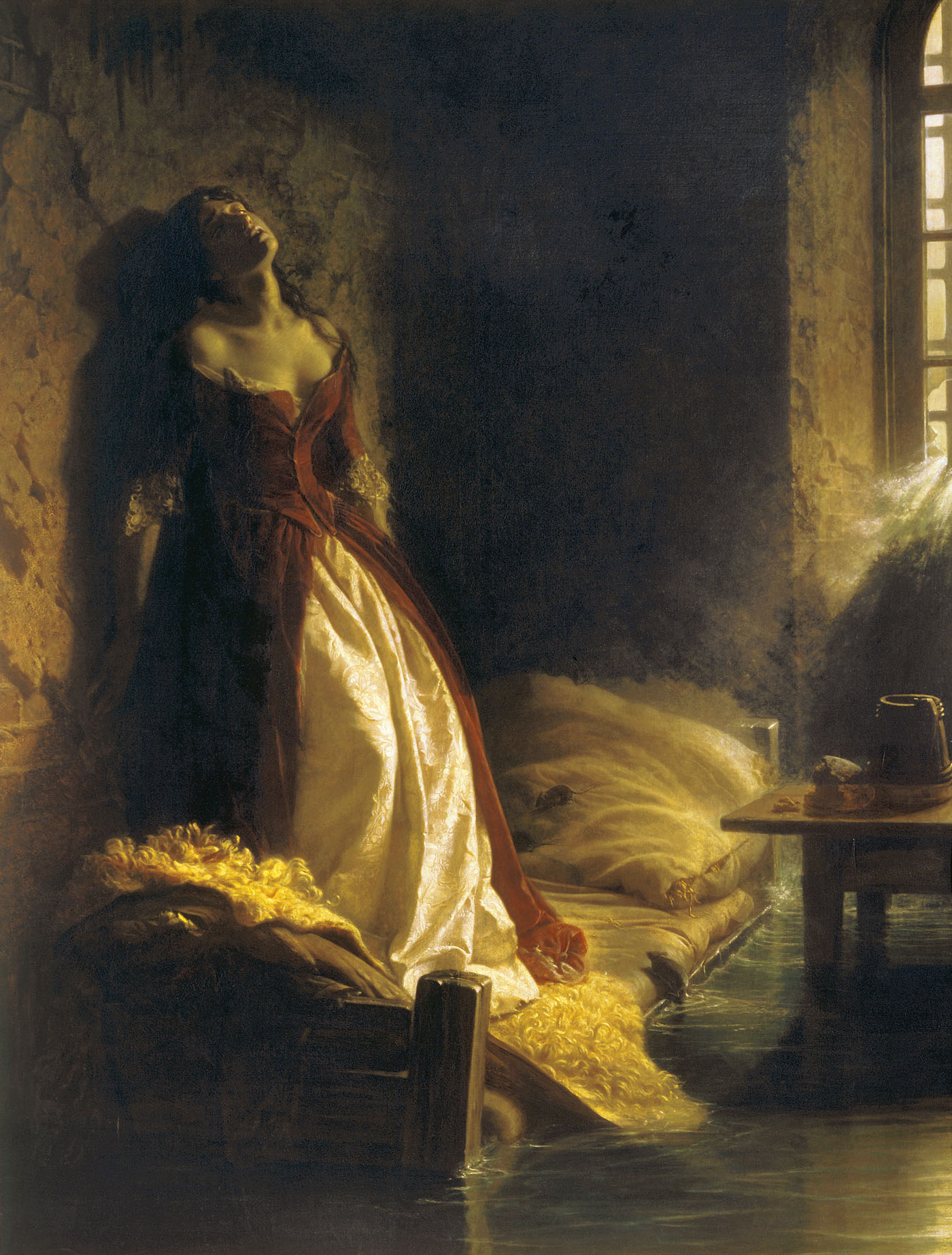
Princess Tarakanova, in the Peter and Paul Fortress at the Time of the Flood (later version from 1864)

== Literary sources ==
- Gorina, Tatyana N. (1958). "Константин Дмитриевич Флавицкий". In Leonov, Alexei I. (ed.). Русское искусство: очерки о жизни и творчестве художников. Середина девятнадцатого века (in Russian). Moscow: Iskusstvo. pp. 487–500. OCLC 174704011.
- Vereshchagina, Alla G. [in Russian] (1990). Историческая картина в русском искусстве: Шестидесятые годы XIX века (in Russian). Moscow: Iskusstvo. ISBN 5-210-00311-6. OCLC 25456986.
