= Alexander Nilsky =

Russian actor

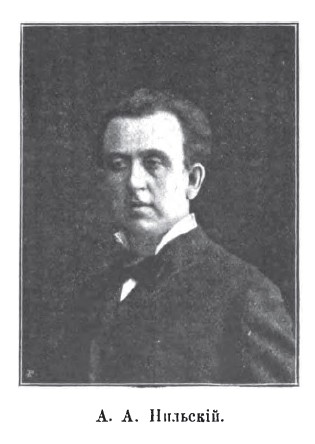
- Born: Alexander Alexandrovich Nilus; 22 July 1840; Saint Petersburg, Russian Empire
- Died: 12 August 1899 (aged 59); Saint Petersburg, Russian Empire
- Occupation: stage actor
- Years active: 1860—1897
- Spouse: Ekaterina Podobedova

Alexander Alexandrovich Nilus (Russian: Александр Александрович Нильский, 22 July 1840—12 August 1899) was a Russian stage actor associated with Alexandrinsky Theatre in Saint Petersburg and known under his stage name, Nilsky (Нильский).

== Biography ==
After graduating from the Saint Petersburg Theatre College he made his debut on stage the Alexandrinka in 1860 and stayed with it until 1883. In 1883—1889 he toured the province and worked with the private troupes in Saint Petersburg (the Nemetti and Panayevsky Theatres) and Moscow (Korsh Theatre), then in 1889—1892 headed the Alexandrovsky Theatre in Helsingfors (Helsinki). In 1892 he returned to Alexandrinka to stay there until 1897.

Nilsky authored a book of memoirs Behind the Curtain Chronicles. 1856-1894, originally published by Istorichesky Vestnik. The Alexandrinka actress Ekaterina Podobedova (1839—1883) was his wife.
