= Maria Savina =

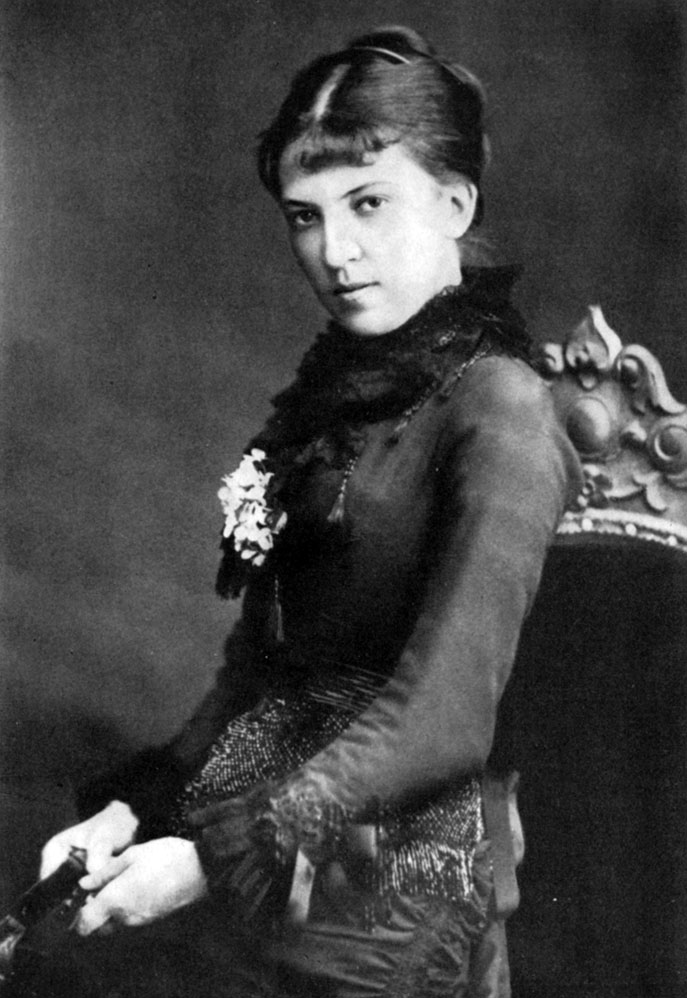
- Savina in 1881
- Born: Марья Гавриловна Подраменцова; 11 April 1854; Kamenets-Podolsky, Russian Empire
- Died: 21 September 1915 (aged 61); Petrograd, Russian Empire
- Occupations: stage actress, memoirist

Maria Gavrilovna Savina (Russian: Мария Гаври́ловна Са́вина, née Podrame′ntsova, 11 April 1854, Kamenets-Podolsky, Imperial Russia – 21 September 1915, Petrograd, Imperial Russia) was a stage actress from the Russian Empire.

== Biography ==
Born Maria Podramentsova into a family of stage actors, she debuted in Minsk in 1869, then joined the Mikhail Leontovsky troupe in Kharkov. While there, she married the actor N. N. Slavich who used the stage name Savin, and has been known as Marya Savina ever since. In 1874 Savina, then the leading actress at the Saratov Theatre, moved to Saint Petersburg to join the Alexandrinsky Theatre. It was there that she became famous, mostly for her parts in Alexander Ostrovsky's plays (including Without a Dowry, Talents and Admirers, A Profitable Position, Hard-Earned Bread, The Last Victim, Vasilisa Melentyeva, Wild Thing), as well as in Nikolai Gogol's Revizor, Ivan Turgenev's A Month in the Country and Leo Tolstoy's The Power of Darkness, among others.

In 1883–1884 Marya Savina was the head of the All-Russian Theatres' Union. In 1897 she initiated Russia's First Congress of Theatres. In 1899 Savina was honoured with the Meritorious Artist title and successfully performed in Berlin and Prague. Her book of memoirs Goresti i skitaniya (Tribes and Tribulations) was published in Moscow in 1961.
