= Princess Tarakanova (painting) =

1864 painting by Konstantin Flavitsky

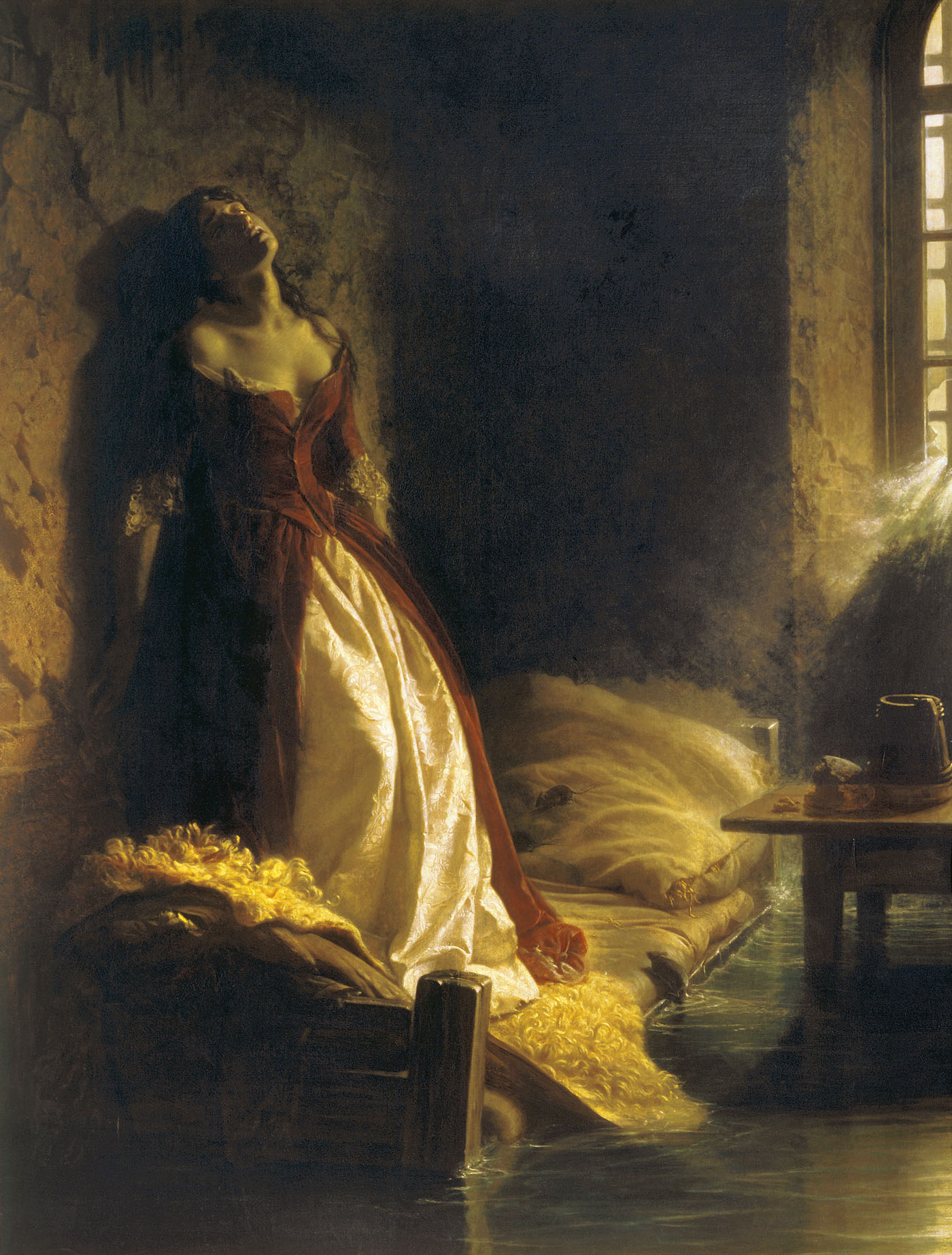
- Artist: Konstantin Flavitsky
- Year: 1864
- Medium: Oil on canvas
- Dimensions: 245 cm × 187 cm (96 in × 74 in)
- Location: State Tretyakov Gallery, Moscow

Princess Tarakanova is the most famous painting by the artist Konstantin Flavitsky. Completed in 1864, the painting depicts the story of Princess Tarakanova, who was imprisoned during the reign of Empress Catherine II. Flavitsky's use of light and shadow and attention to detail in the painting earned him the title of professor of historical painting, and it remains one of his most famous works.

== Plot ==
The plot for the painting was based on the legend of Princess Tarakanova's death during the flood in Saint Petersburg on September 21, 1777 (historical records show that she died two years before this event). The canvas depicts a casemate in the Peter and Paul Fortress, with floodwaters raging outside the walls. On a bed, a young woman stands, trying to escape from the water that is flowing through a barred window. Wet rats emerge from the water, crawling towards the prisoner's feet.

Although the legend about Tarakanova's death during the flood is not true, it was this version of her death that was fixed in the popular memory, thanks to Flavitsky. For example, in the poem "Soul," Boris Pasternak writes: "you fight like Princess Tarakanova fought when the ravelin was flooded in February."

== Creation history ==
The story of Princess Tarakanova, a social climber who claimed to be the daughter of Empress Elizabeth Petrovna and sister of Yemelyan Pugachev, served as the basis for creating the painting. By order of Empress Catherine II, she was arrested and in May 1775 was taken to the Peter and Paul Fortress, where she was subjected to lengthy interrogation by Field Marshal Prince Golitsyn, during which she gave various testimonies. She died of consumption on December 4, 1775, hiding the secret of her birth even from a priest.

The painting was created in 1864 and was first exhibited at the Academy of Arts exhibition in the same year. Vladimir Stasov, a famous critic of the time who highly valued the painting, called Flavitsky's canvas a "miraculous painting, the glory of our school, the most brilliant creation of Russian painting." The painting was acquired by Pavel Tretyakov for his collection after the artist's death.

== Other versions ==
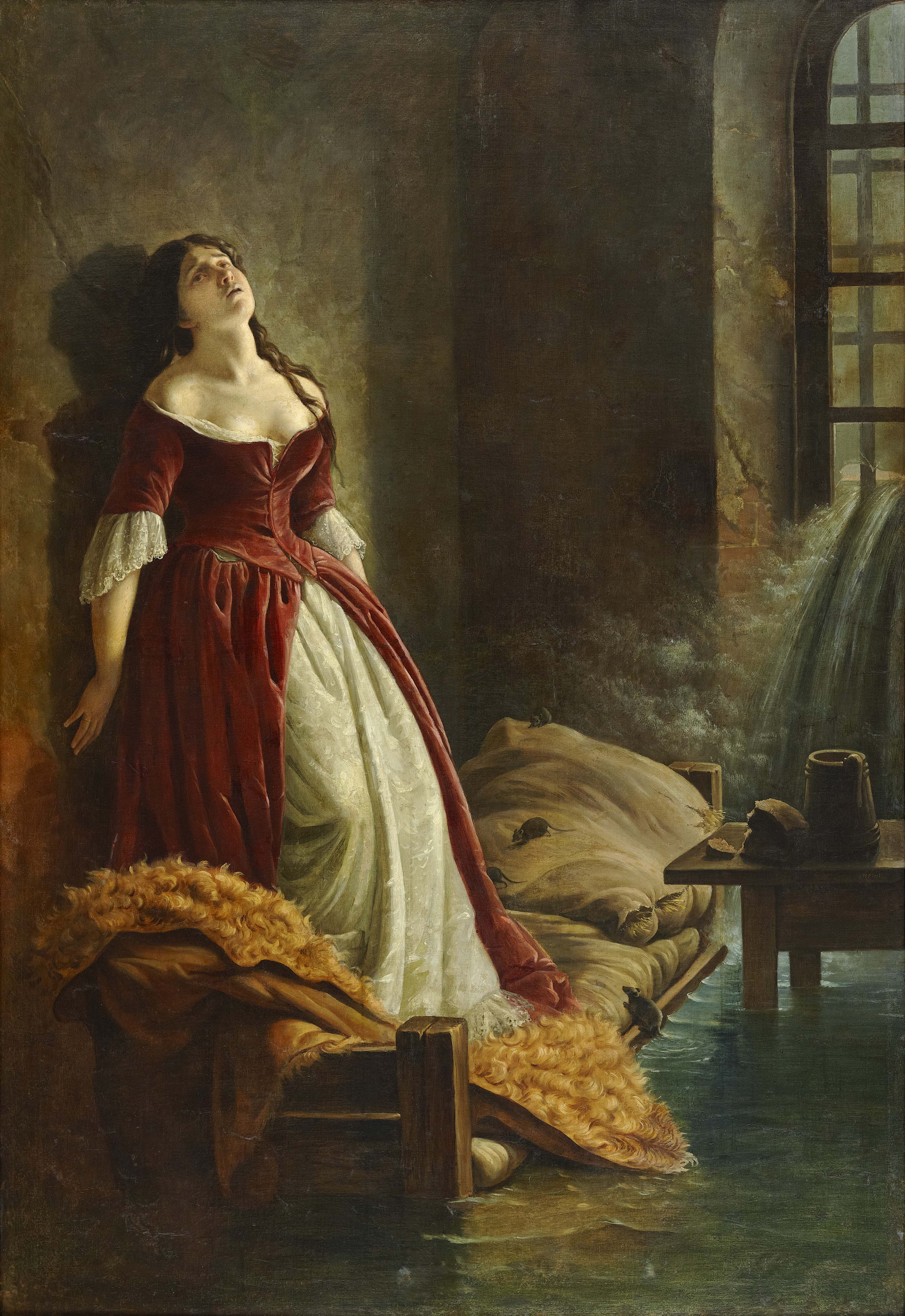
1862 version

In the Ekaterinburg Museum of Fine Arts, the presumed original version of the painting, created in 1862, is stored. The differences lie in the size of the canvas, which is 214 × 147 centimeters, and in the figurative interpretation: the face and figure of the young woman do not yet convey the tragedy and final despair. Therefore, the version from the Tretyakov Gallery collection is a later copy.

Another version from 1864 is stored in the Art Galerry, Penza. It is smaller in size, measuring 123 × 94 centimeters.

Additionally, in the Russian Museum, there is the "Head of Princess Tarakanova," a study for the painting of 1863. It measures 44.5 × 33.5 centimeters and was donated to the museum by Pyotr Ge in 1903.
