= Tchaikovsky Museum (Votkinsk) =

Museum in Votkinsk, Udmurtia, Russia

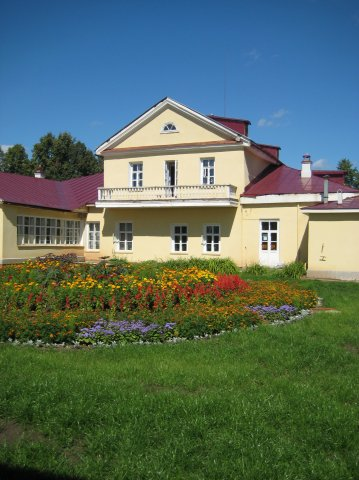
Tchaikovsky Museum in Votkinsk

The Museum Estate of P.I. Tchaikovsky (Russian: Музей-усадьба П.И. Чайковского), commonly known as the Tchaikovsky Museum, is a museum in the town of Votkinsk, Udmurtia, Russia, dedicated to the composer Pyotr Ilyich Tchaikovsky, who spent his early childhood there.

== See also ==
- Tchaikovsky State House-Museum
- List of music museums
