= Tchaikovsky State House-Museum =

Coordinates: 56°19′44″N 36°44′49″E

The Tchaikovsky House-Museum in Klin

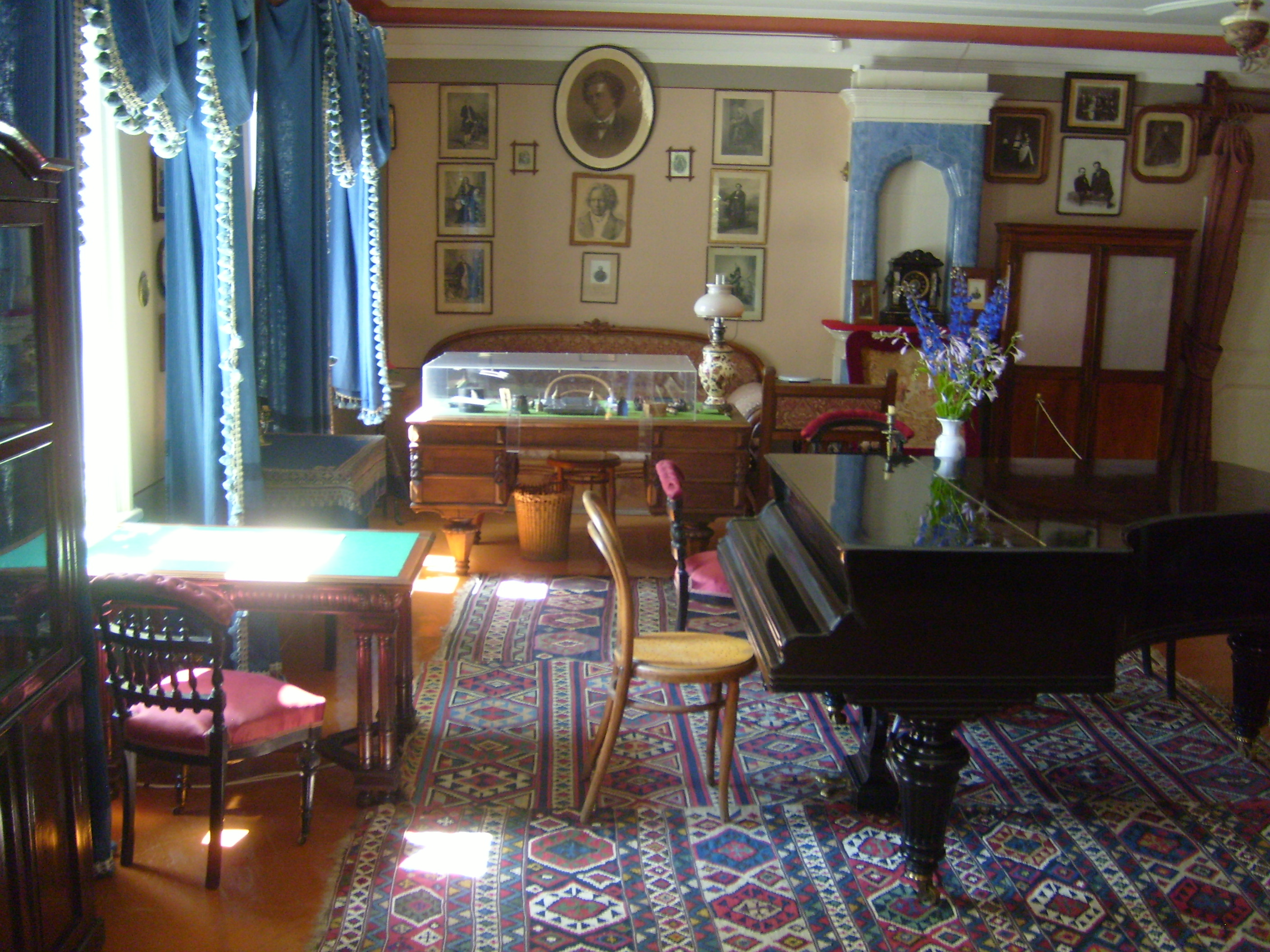
Salon of Tchaikovsky house, with his piano and desk

The Tchaikovsky House-Museum was the country home in Klin, 85 kilometers northwest of Moscow, where Pyotr Ilyich Tchaikovsky lived from May 1892 until his death in 1893. His last major work, the 6th Symphony, was written there. The house is now a museum.

== Tchaikovsky in Klin ==
In 1885, Tchaikovsky wrote to his friend and patron: "These days I dream of settling in a village not far from Moscow. I can't wander any longer, and I'm anxious to come and stay at a place where I can feel at home." Early that year he rented a small house in the village of Maidanovo (Майданово) two kilometers from the small town of Klin. Later between 1888 and 1891 he rented a house in another nearby village, Frolovskoye (Фроловское). (Both the Maidanovo house and the later Frolovskoye house were later demolished.) Tchaikovsky lived in the Maidanovo house from February 1885 until March 1888. The house was located on the bank of the Sestra River, and had but overgrown park with ponds and old lime trees. It was not far from the railway station to both Moscow and St. Petersburg, but far enough from the city to deter unwelcome visitors, so he would not be disturbed. In the Maidanovo house Tchaikovsky rewrote an old opera he had composed in 1874, Vakula the Smith, transforming it into a new opera, Cherevichki. He also wrote the Manfred symphony and another opera, Charodeika. In the evenings Tchaikovsky read magazines and books, played the piano, had conversations with guests, strolled in the forest, gathered mushrooms, gardened and swam.

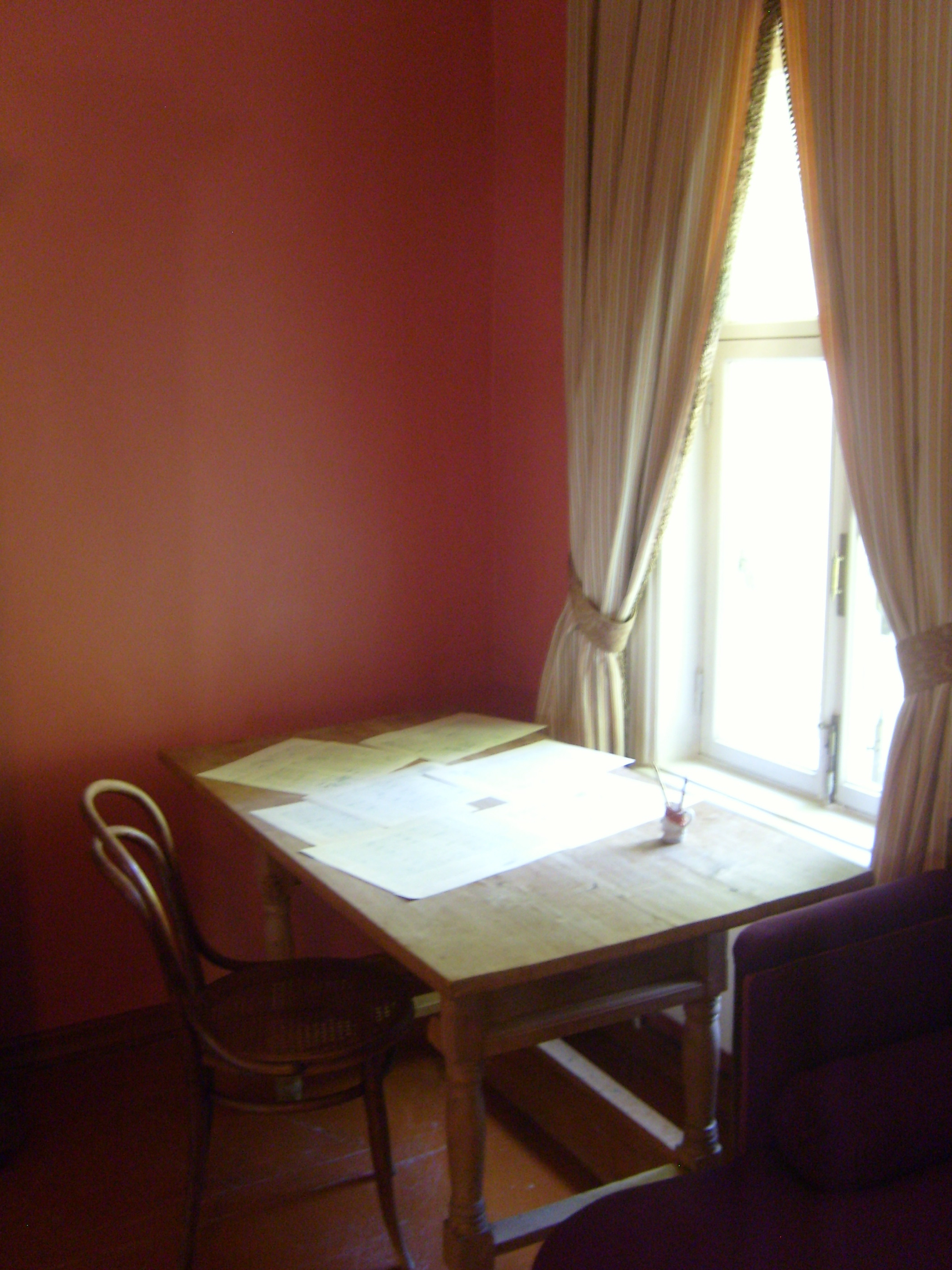
Table in the bedroom overlooking the garden, where Tchaikovsky wrote his Symphony No. 6

Unfortunately for Tchaikovsky, increasing numbers of vacationers came to Maidanovo, along with increasing numbers of people who wanted to see him. After a three-month concert tour to Europe, he decided to move to another house in the area, in the village of Frolovskoye. In May 1892, Tchaikovsky wrote to his brother Anatoly: "I rented a house in Klin to live there. Probably you saw it – the Sakharovs' house, large, comfortable, out-of-town, near the highway to Moscow... I am in need – and I feel it – of having a house in the countryside, or, which is almost the same, in Klin, to make sure that I can get, whenever I wish, a calm, quiet place to work. Besides, I've become accustomed to Klin. The view from inside the house is really wonderful, and there is a rather large garden. I am thinking of buying this house in the future."

During his time at the house in Klin, Tchaikovsky finished proof-reading the scores of Iolanta and The Nutcracker, wrote 18 Morceaux for piano, Op. 72, the vocal quartet Night, 6 Romances, Op. 73, and the Symphony No. 6 in B minor (Op. 74, Pathetique).

On October 3, 1893, he finished his Piano Concerto No. 3. On October 7 he departed from Klin for Moscow and then to St. Petersburg, where he conducted the premiere of his 6th symphony. He died in St. Petersburg on October 25 (November 6 new style) at the age of 53.

== Tchaikovsky's work habits ==
Tchaikovsky's daily routine at Klin was described by his brother and biographer, Modest Tchaikovsky: "Pyotr Ilyich got up between 7 and 8 a.m. in the morning. After tea and reading, he would go for a walk which usually lasted about an hour. A conversation at breakfast, as well as a walk in someone's company, meant that Tchaikovsky was not going to compose that day; instead he would be busy with instrumentation, making corrections, or writing letters.

After dinner, he went for a walk again in any weather. Solitude during walks was as necessary for him as it was during work. In those moments he thought over the main musical themes and formed the ideas of future compositions".

== The interior of the Tchaikovsky House ==
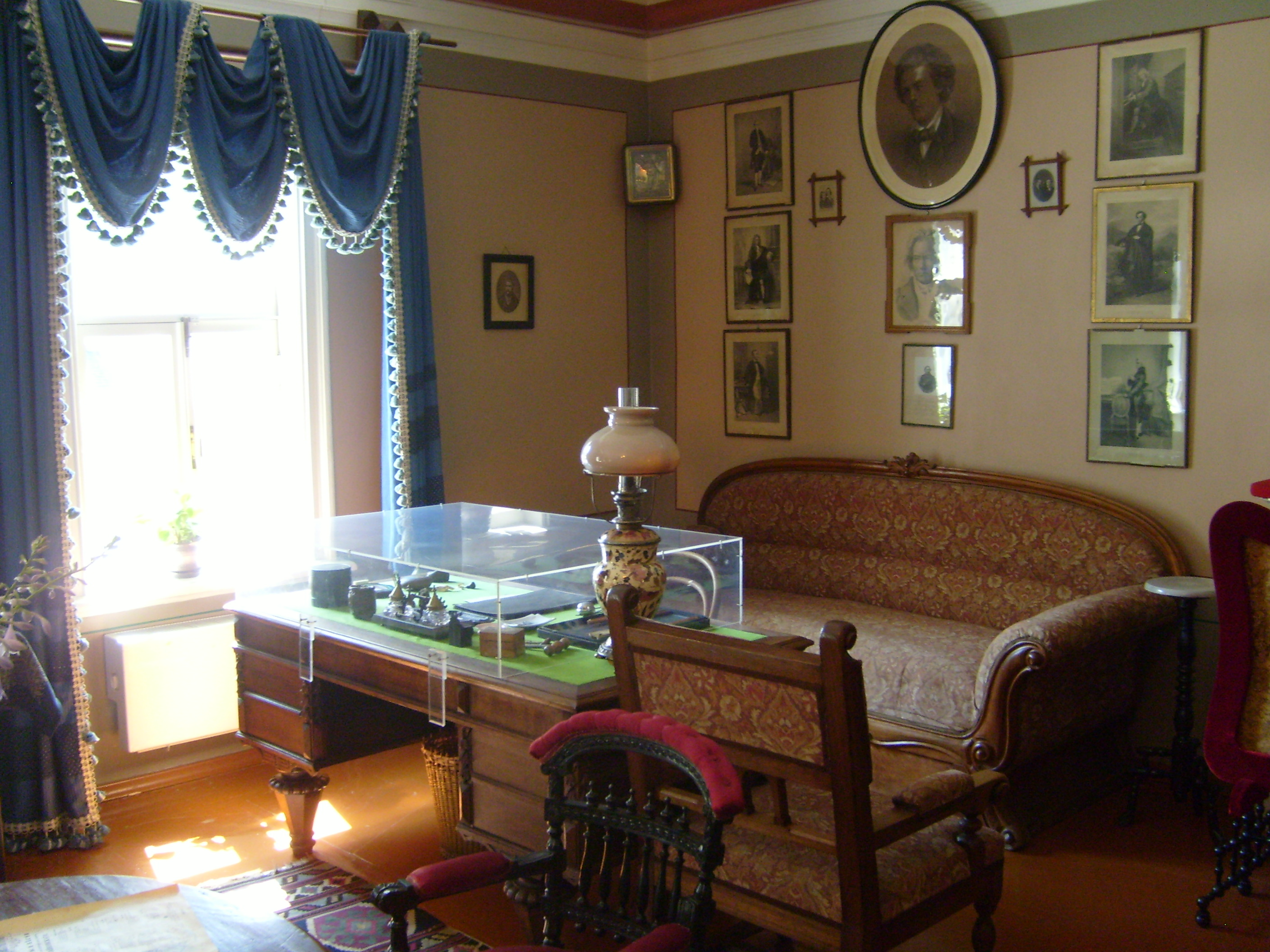
Tchaikovsky's desk in his reception room, where he wrote his correspondence. Over the desk is a portrait of his composition teacher Anton Rubinstein

The house was built in the 1870s by V.S. Sakharov, on land given to the family by Emperor Nicholas I. It was rarely used by the Sakharov family, which rented and then sold it to Tchaikovsky. Tchaikovsky lived on the second floor, while the family of his servant, Alexei Sofronov, lived on the ground floor. The kitchen and dining room were also on the first floor.

The reception room and study on the second floor, where his piano is located, is the largest room of the house. The piano is a Becker, which was given him by the St. Petersburg firm in 1885, when he first arrived in Maidanovo. Tchaikovsky never played the piano in a concert hall for an audience, but he did play at home for his guests, and enjoyed playing duets on the piano with visiting musicians. His evening entertainments also usually included oral readings of literature.

His writing desk, where he wrote letters every morning after breakfast, is at the end of the room. Over the desk, in the place of honor, is a picture of Anton Rubinstein, the founder of the St. Petersburg Conservatory of Music and his first teacher of instrumentation and composing. Just below the picture of Rubenstein is a picture of Beethoven. On the other walls are many photographs of his family, in particular of his father, Ilya Petrovich Tchaikovsky, and his mother, Alexandra Andreyevna. Nearby are two bookcases containing his musical library and his library of Russian and foreign literature, and the bound sets of magazines to which he subscribed. The other cabinets in the room are filled with gifts to Tchaikovsky, including an ink-pot in the form of the Statue of Liberty given to him during his visit to the United States.

The bedroom of the composer adjoins the reception room through a doorway covered with a curtain. He composed music in this room on a plain unpainted table overlooking the garden. The table was made of Karelian birch by village workers in Maidanovo, when he first settled in the Klin region. This was the table on which Tchaikovsky composed his 6th Symphony, the Pathetique, the last major work before his death.

== Tchaikovsky's garden ==
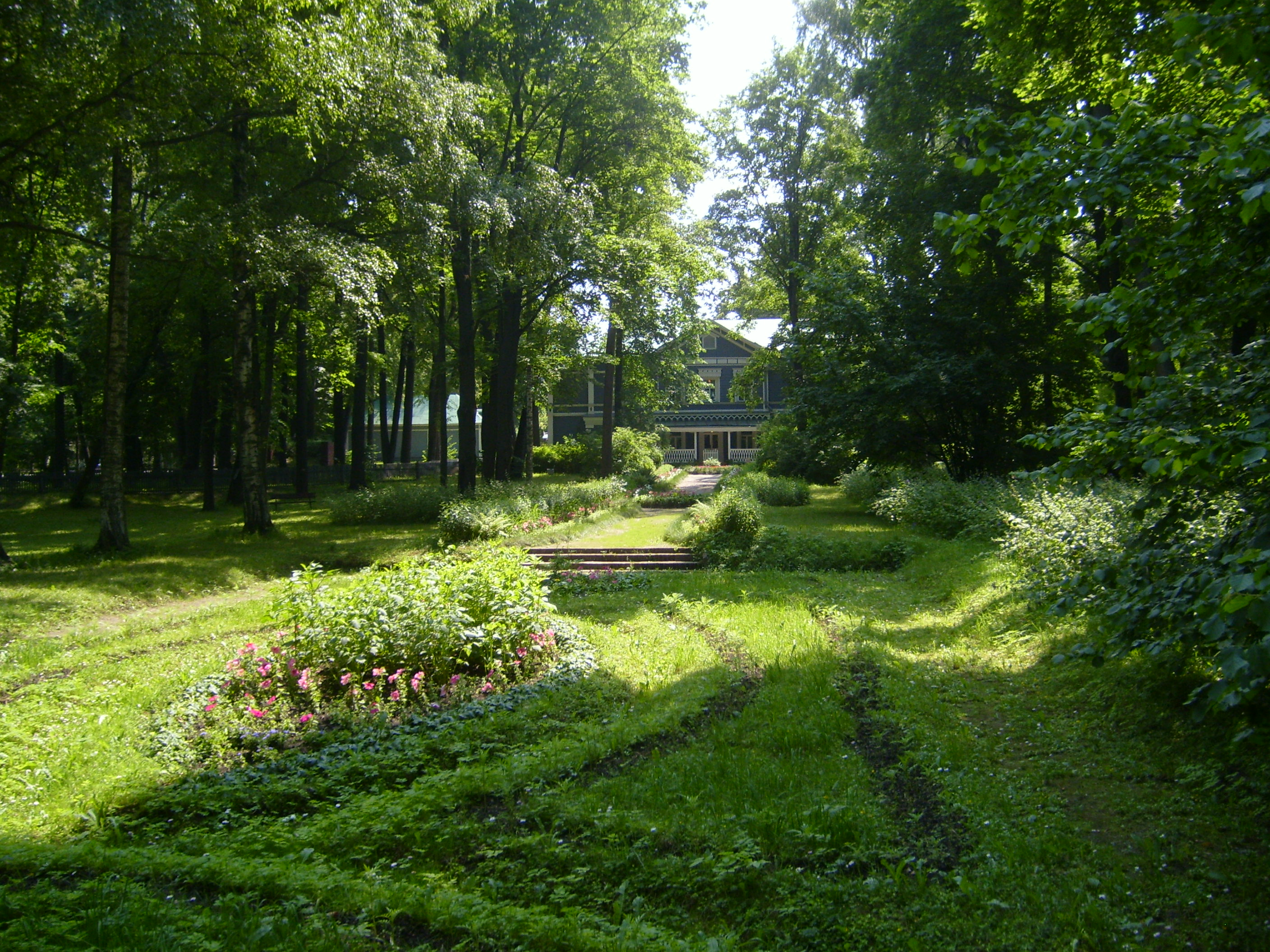
Tchaikovsky's garden with a bed of lilies of the valley

In his final years, Tchaikovsky was strongly attracted to nature, country life and his garden. He wrote to Nadezhda von Meck: "The nearer I approach old age, the more lovely is my pleasure being close to nature. Never before have I reveled so much in the beauty of spring, the awakening vegetation, birds returning home – in short, everything which is brought by the Russian spring, actually the most beautiful and jovial spring on earth".

He also wrote: "It is impossible to suggest a better a more suitable way of living than in the countryside. After each new trip to Moscow I come to realize more and more how city life ruins me. Each time I return here I'm completely ill, but I immediately recover in my quiet corner".

His garden was not tidy and orderly, but rather like an idealized forest, with a winding path and a gazebo at the far end from the house. Tchaikovsky adored flowers, particularly the wild flowers of the fields and forest that he saw on his daily walks. He was especially fond of the lily of the valley, to which he even wrote a poem. After his death, his brother Modest planted islands of lilies of the valley around the garden, along with the violets, forget-me-nots, and bluebells that Tchaikovsky admired. The garden has many other varieties of flowers it had in Tchaikovsky's time: roses, begonias, gillyflowers, phloxes, and sweet tobacco.

== The house and the Museum after Tchaikovsky's death ==
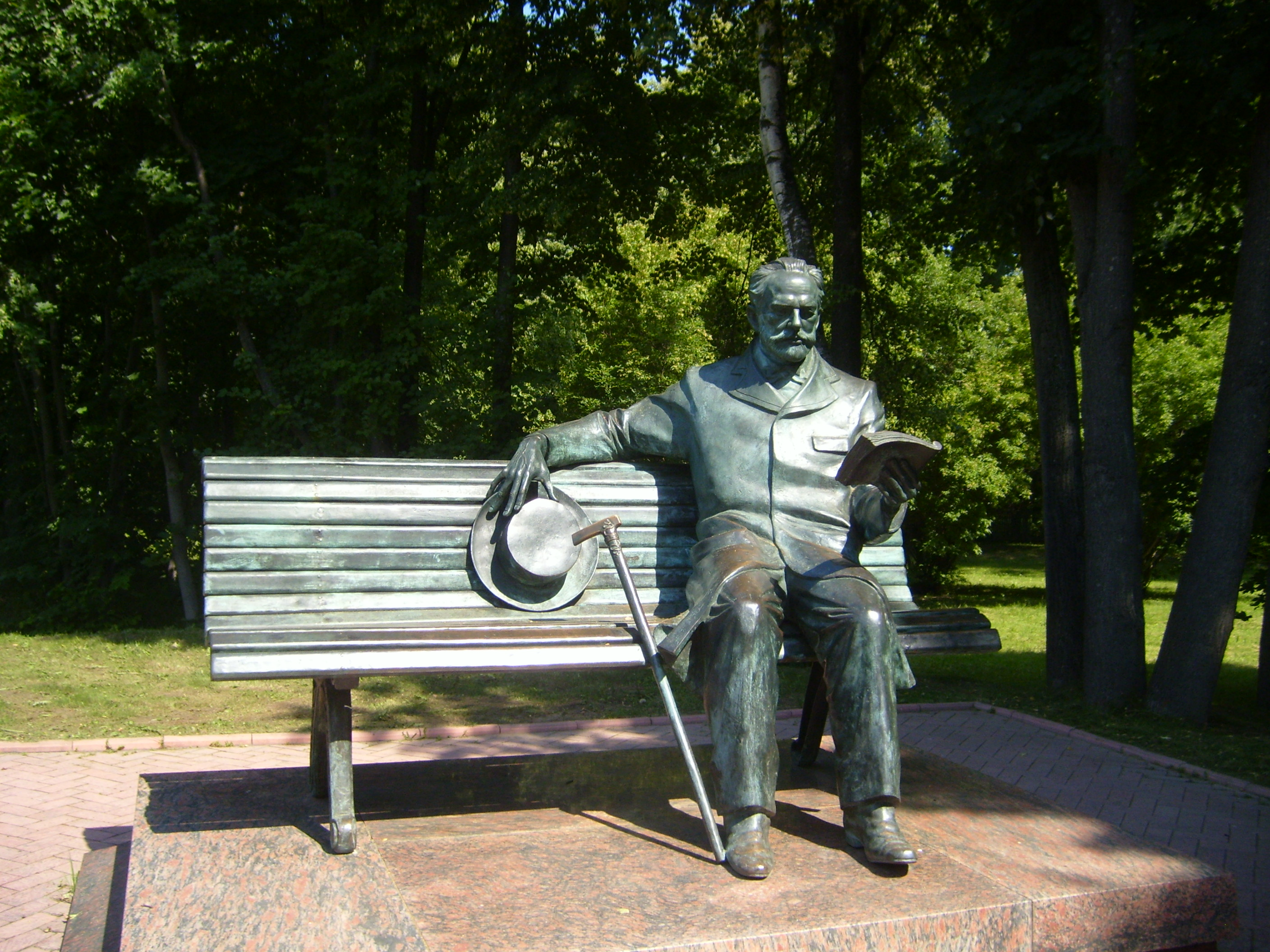
Statue of Tchaikovsky near his garden at Klin

After Tchaikovsky's death, his younger brother, Modest Tchaikovsky, a playwright and translator, decided to create a museum, the first such musical and memorial museum in Russia. The composer's nephew, Vladimir Davydov, who held the rights to Tchaikovsky's works, joined in the project. They built a separate house on the grounds so the main house could remain as it was, and made an archive of Tchaikovsky's musical scores, manuscripts and library. Modest Tchaikovsky wrote the first biography of Tchaikovsky. When Modest Tchaikovsky died in 1916, he willed the house to the Moscow Department of the Russian Musical Society, with the requirement that it strictly follow the rules of the Mozart Museum in Salzburg and the Beethoven Museum in Bonn.

In 1917, after the Bolshevik revolution, an anarchist named Doroshenko settled with his family in the museum, and was reported to have fired shots at the portrait of Pope Innocent hanging in one of the bedrooms. He was finally arrested in April 1918. In 1918 the museum was given the status of protected site by the People's Commissariat for Education, and in 1921 it was declared to be property of the state.

Following the Nazi invasion of Russia in June 1941, the museum collection of memorabilia and the library were transferred to the small town of Votkinsk, Tchaikovsky's birthplace, in Udmurtia. The house was occupied by the Germans during the Battle of Moscow in 1941–42. They used the first floor as a garage for motorcycles and the upper floor as a barracks. At the end of 1944, the exhibits were returned, and the museum opened again on May 6, 1945, on the eve of Tchaikovsky's birthday.

In the 1920s, it became a tradition for musicians to gather and perform at the house on May 7 each year to commemorate Tchaikovsky's birthday. Noted pianists, including Vladimir Horowitz, were given the privilege of playing Tchaikovsky's grand piano in his salon. Beginning in 1958, winners of the annual International Tchaikovsky Competition, including Van Cliburn (1958), Mikhail Pletnev (1978) and Boris Berezovsky (1990), were also invited to come to Klin to play his piano. Musicians from the competition began a tradition of planting oak trees in the garden.

In 1964, a concert hall, exhibit space and visitor center was opened near the house.

== Gallery of the Tchaikovsky House-Museum at Klin ==
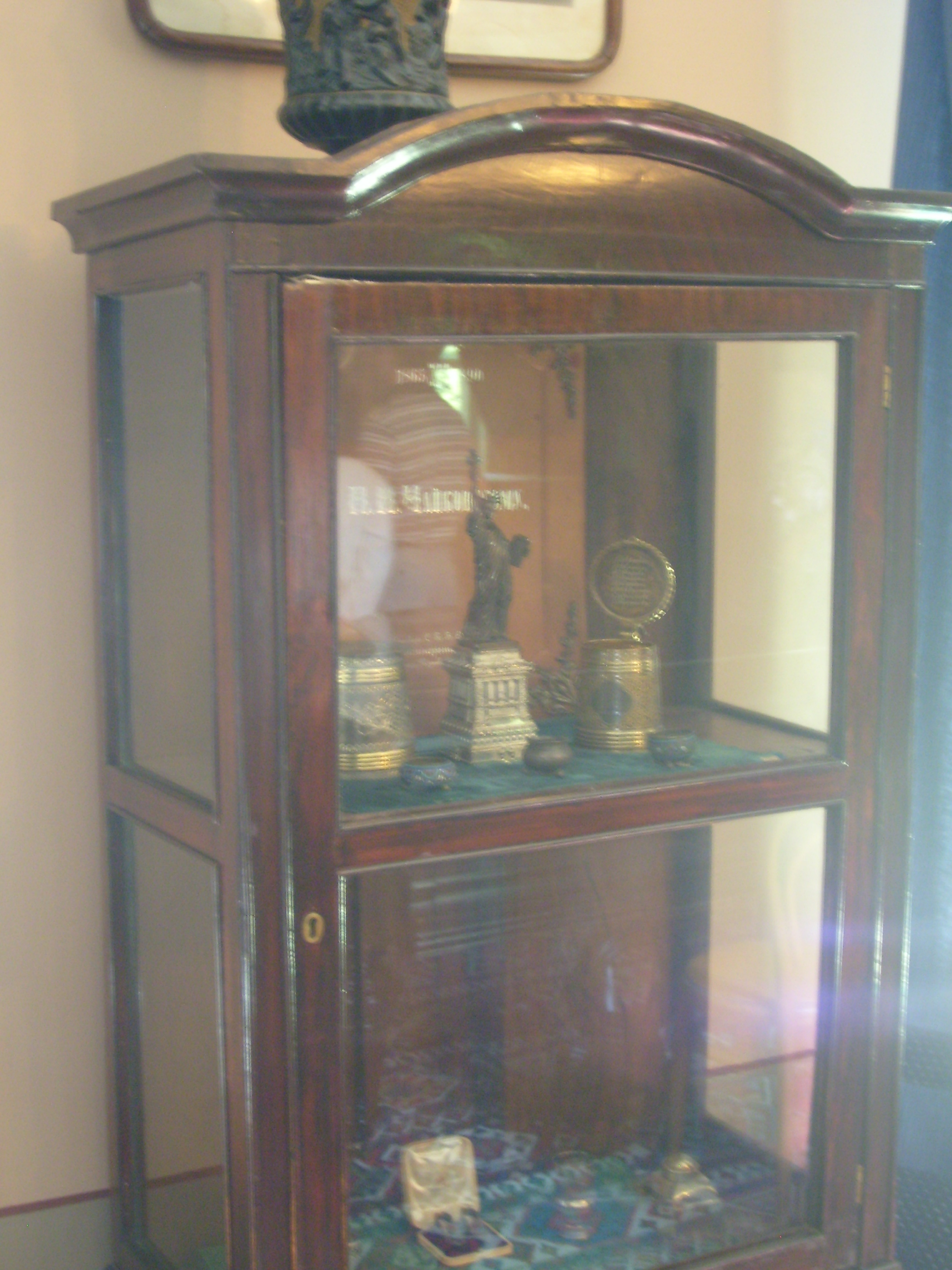
A cabinet of souvenirs given to Tchaikovsky, including an inkwell in the shape of the Statue of Liberty given by his American admirers during his visit to New York in 1891

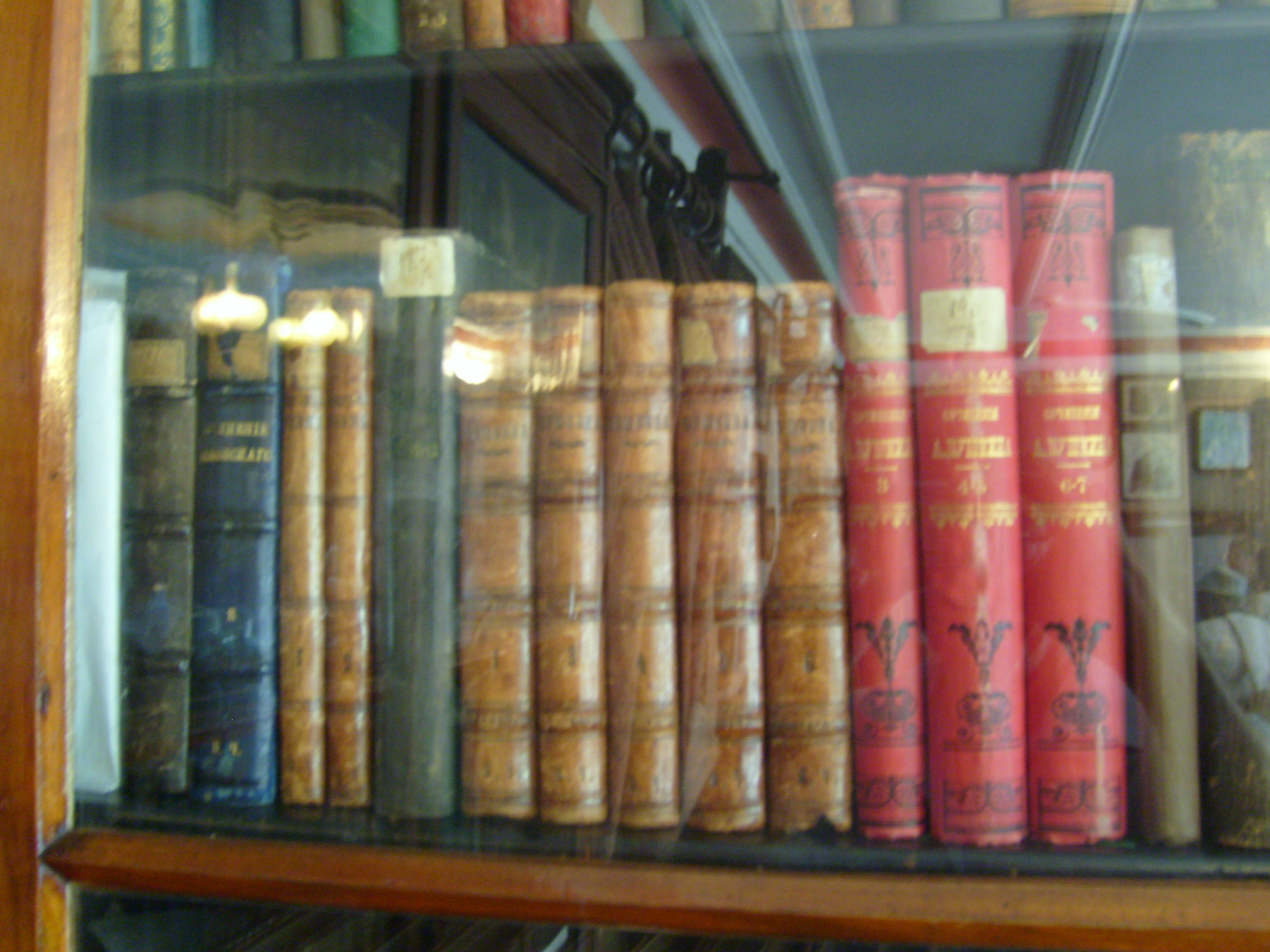
The collected works of Pushkin (in brown leather bindings) in Tchaikovsky's bookcase. They were the source of his operas Eugene Onegin and The Queen of Spades.

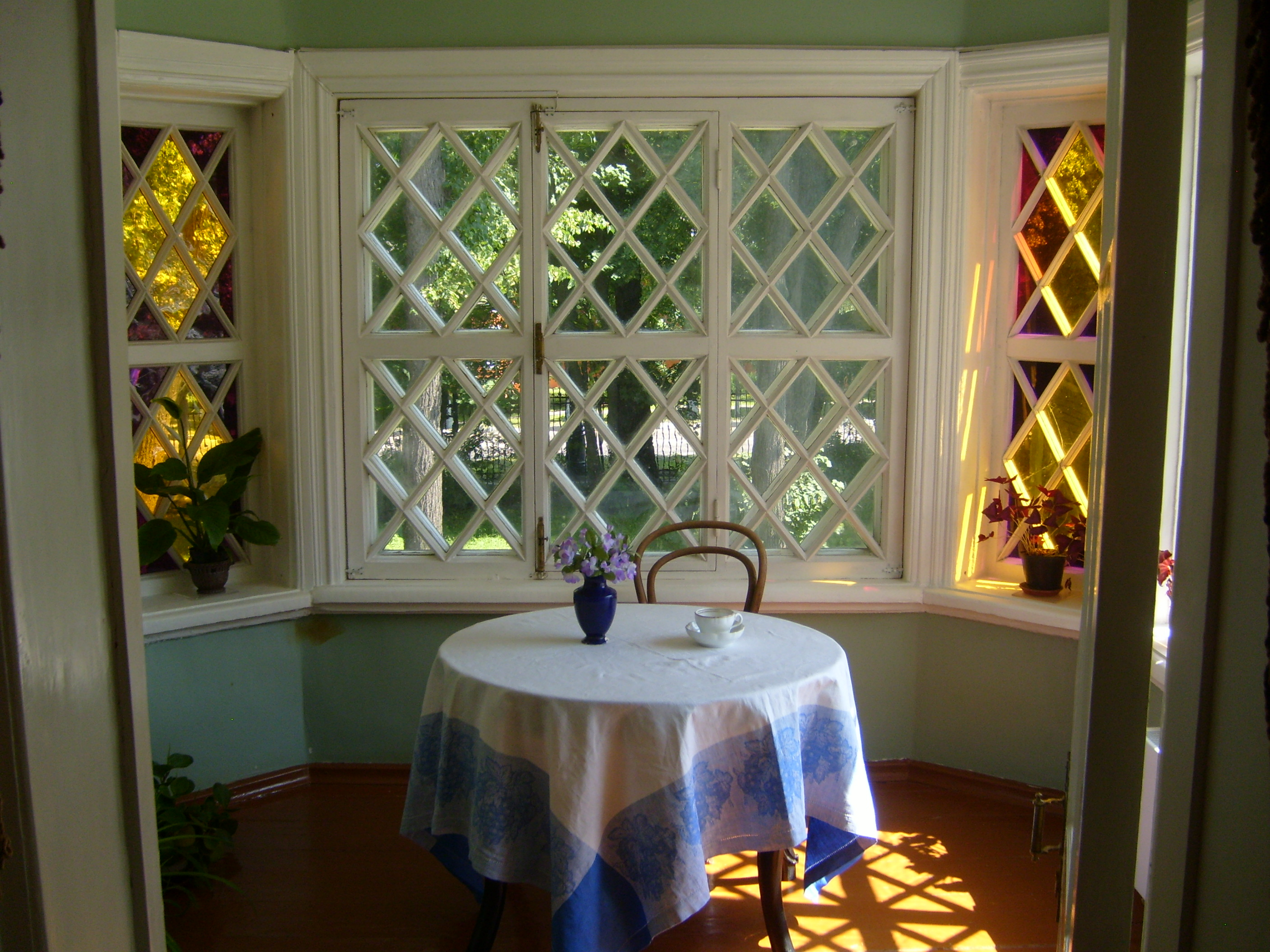
Small tea room adjoining Tchaikovsky's reception room

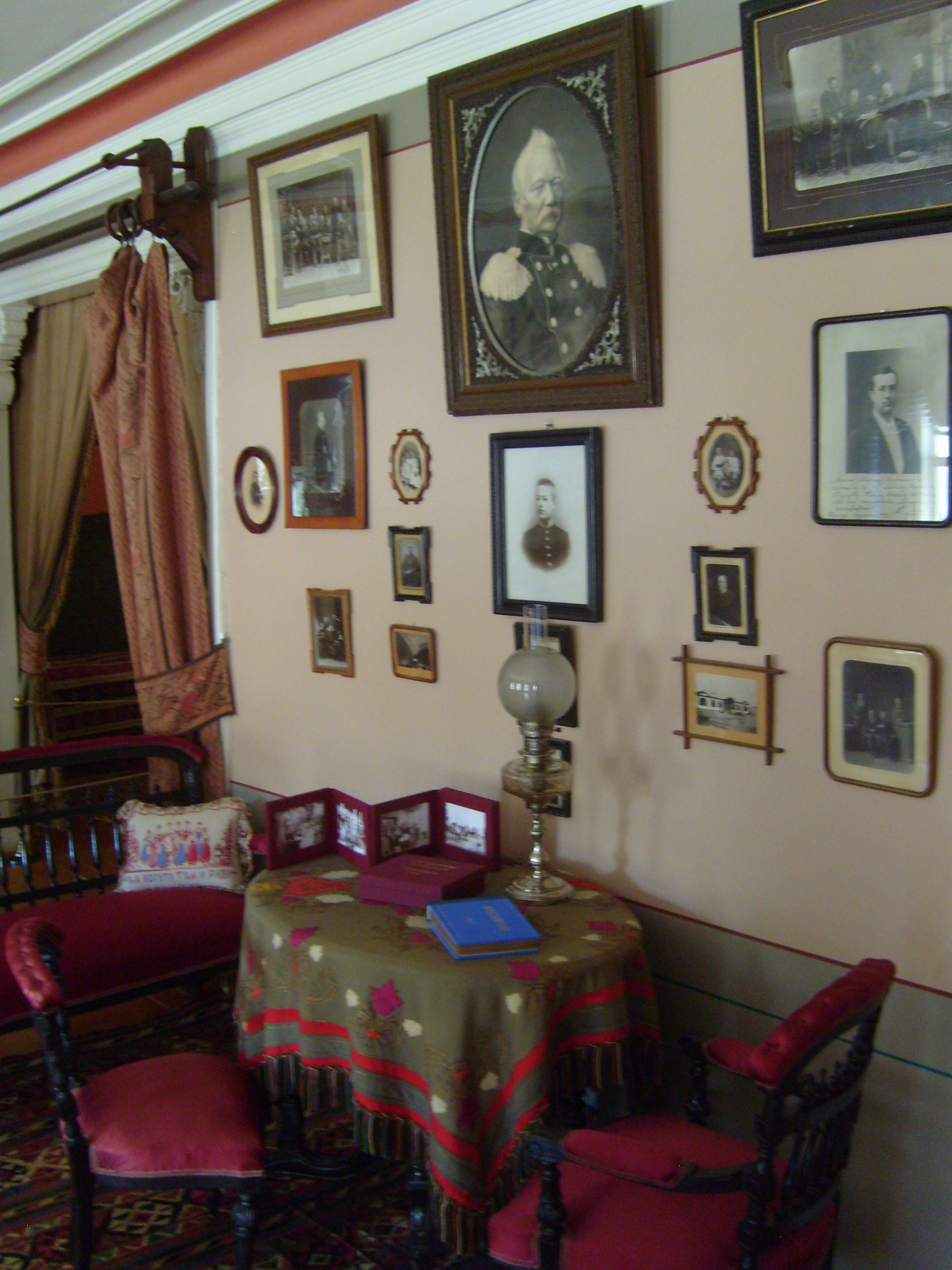
Portrait of Tchaikovsky's father and other family members in his reception room. The curtained doorway leads to his bedroom.

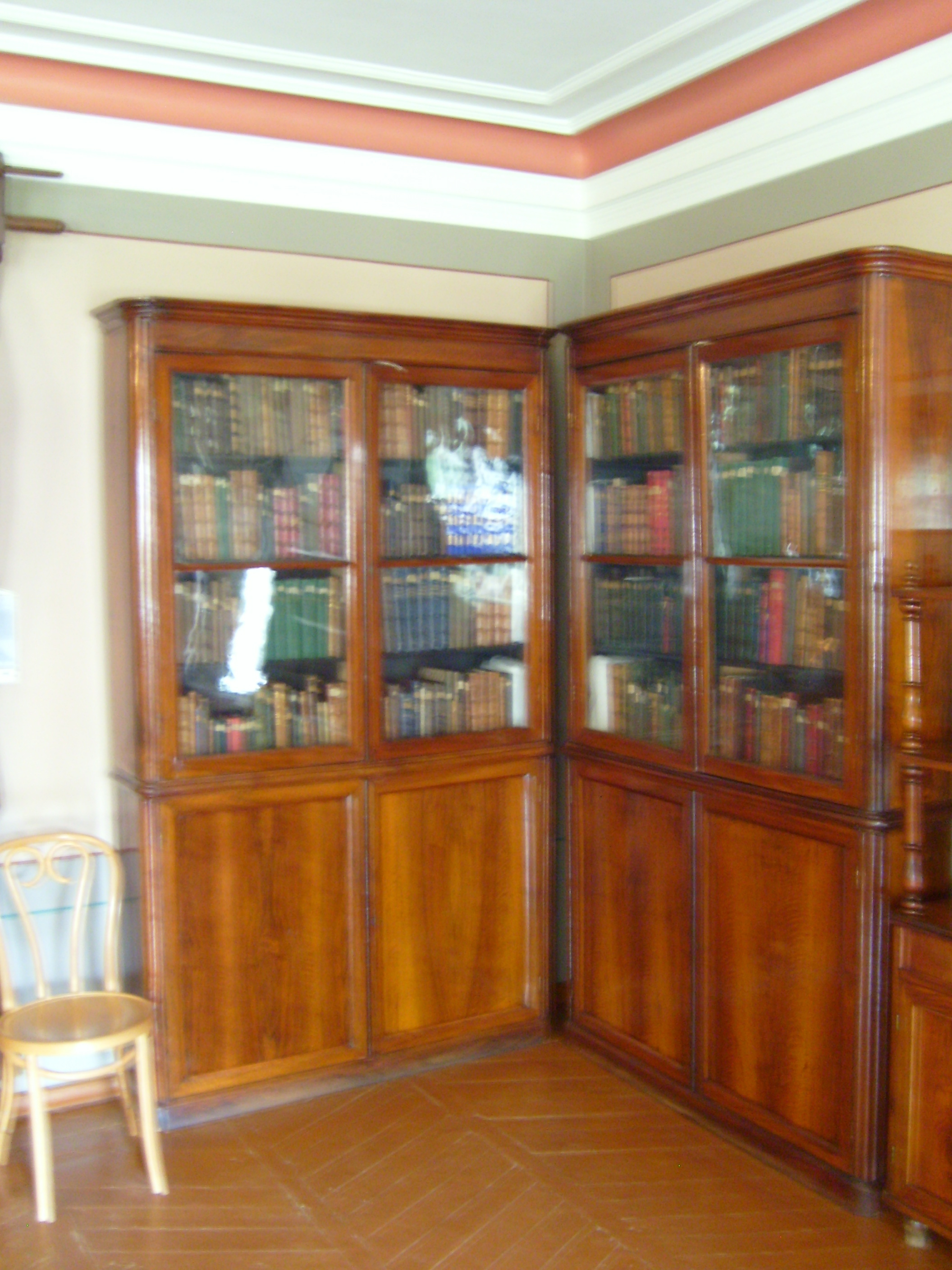
Tchaikovsky's bookshelves in his reception room

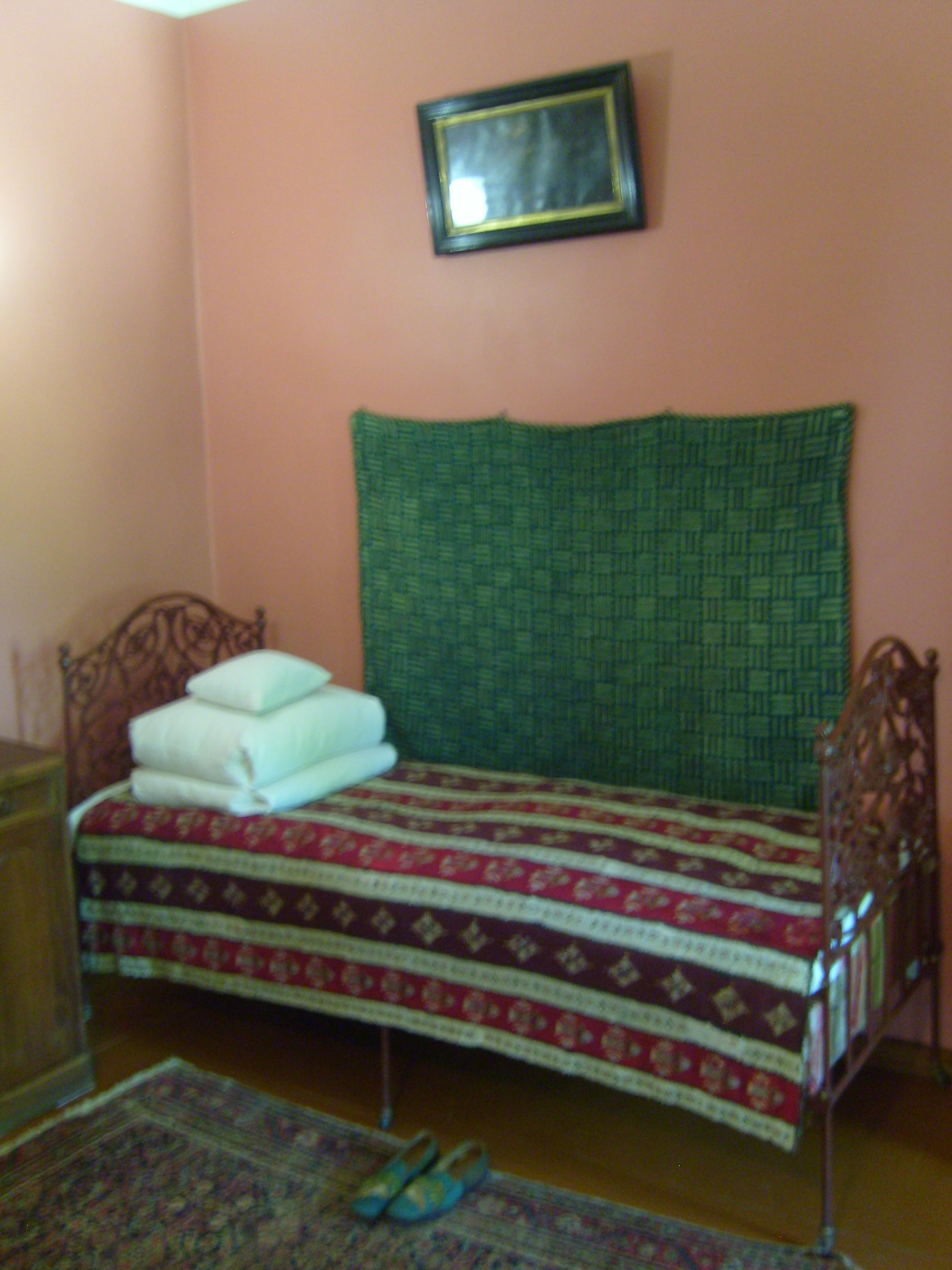
Tchaikovsky's bed

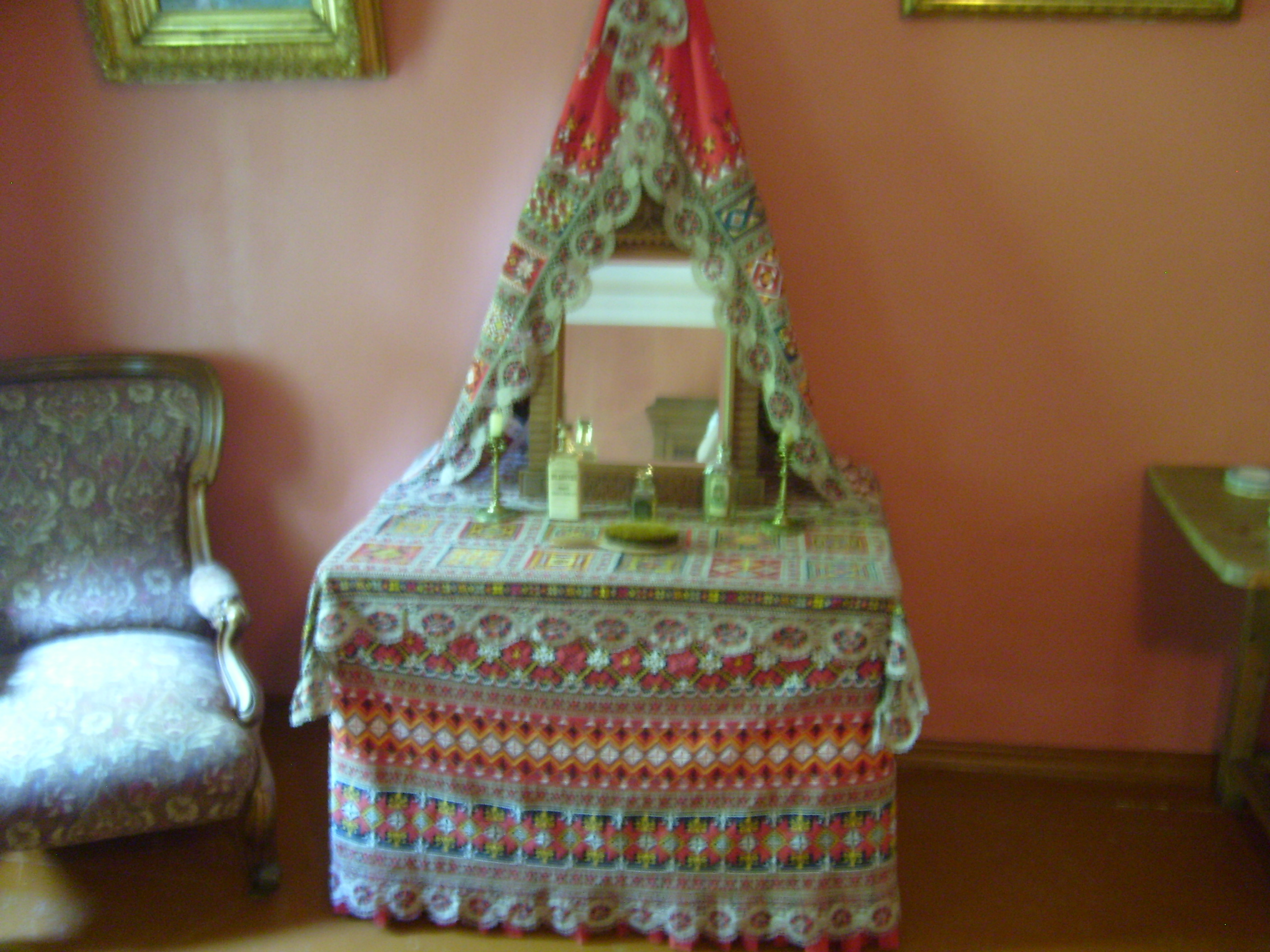
The dressing table in Tchaikovsky's bedroom

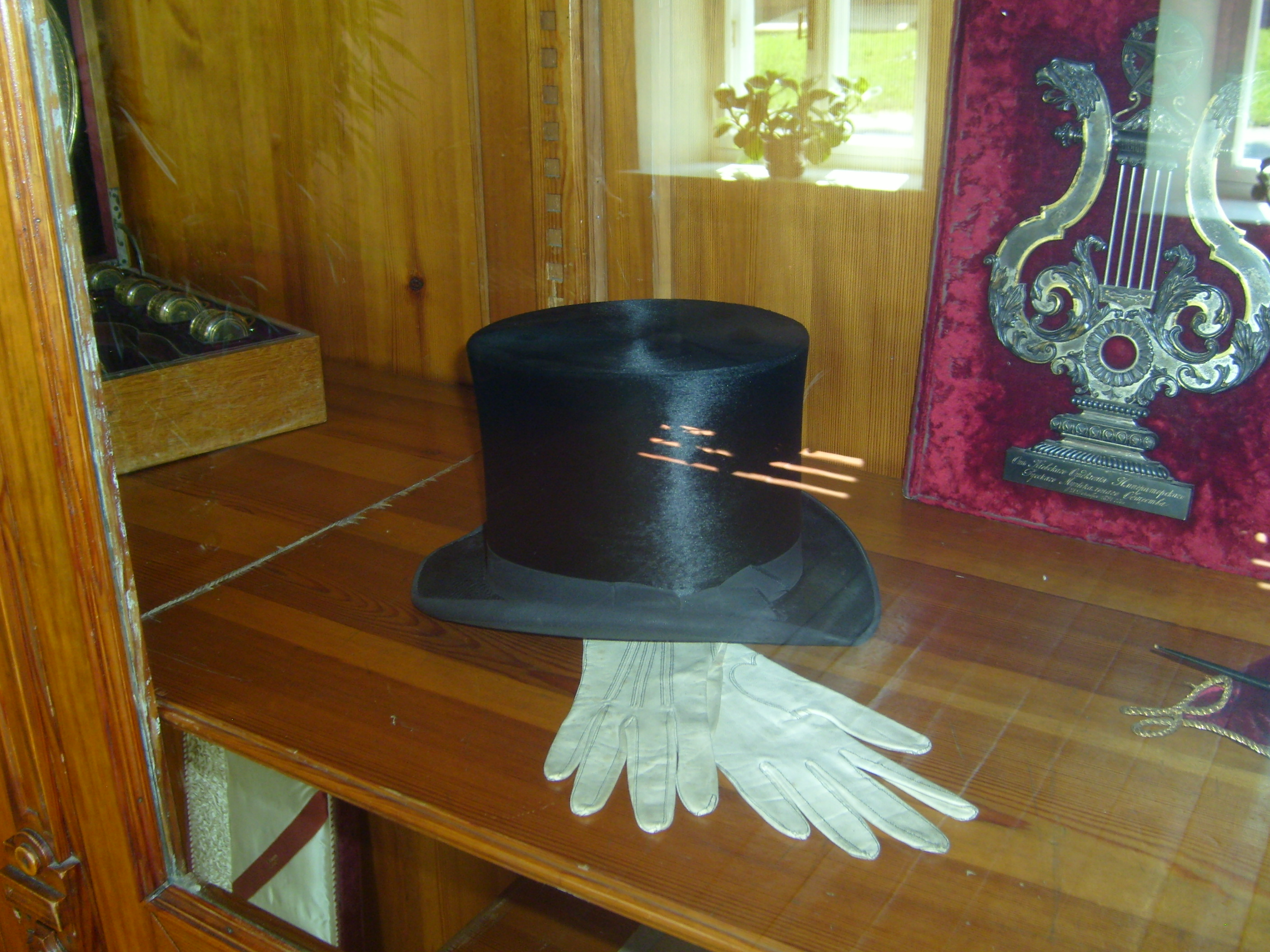
Tchaikovsky's top hat and gloves

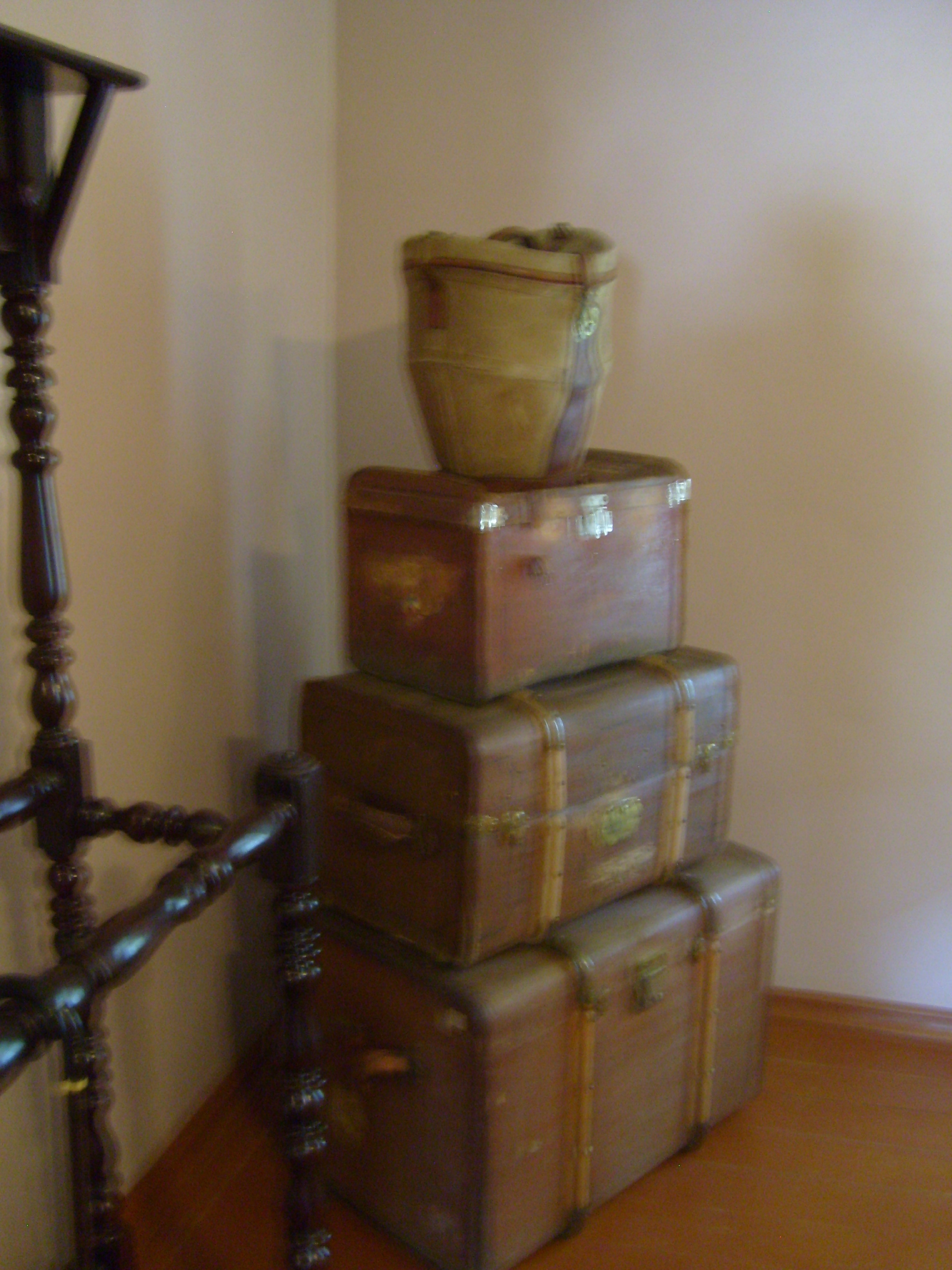
Tchaikovsky's luggage taken on his concert tours

== See also ==
- Tchaikovsky Museum (Votkinsk)
- List of music museums

== Bibliography ==
- Галина Ивановна Белонович (1994). П.И. Чайковский хусе-мусеум ин Клин. ISBN 978-5-85025-093-5.
- Tchaikovsky, Modest, Zhizn P.I. Chaykovskovo [Tchaikovsky's life], 3 vols. (Moscow, 1900–1902).
- Tchaikovsky, Pyotr, Perepiska s N.F. von Meck [Correspondence with Nadzehda von Meck], 3 vols. (Moscow and Leningrad, 1934–1936).
